= List of triplanes =

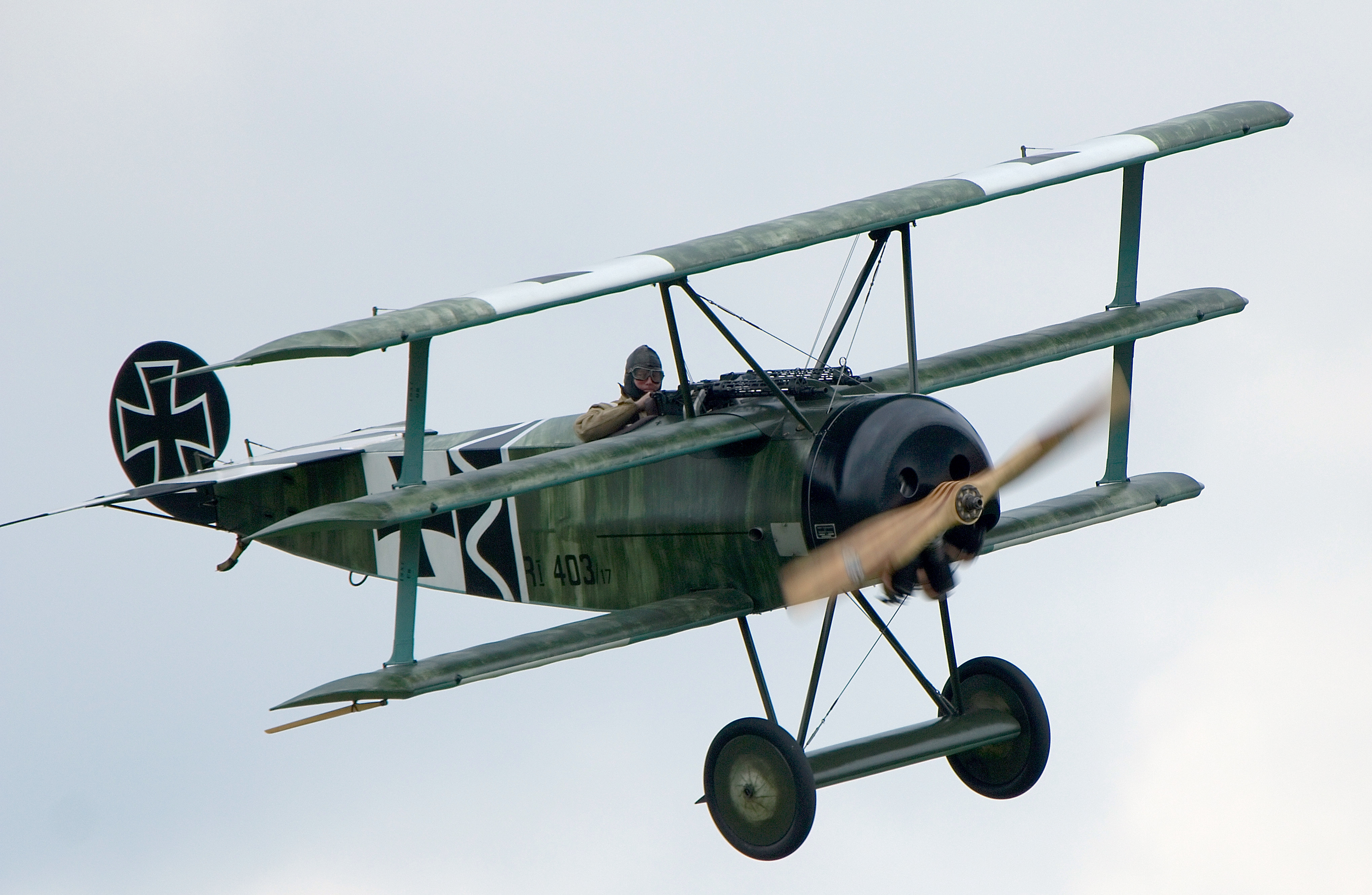
Fokker Dr.I triplane replica

This is a list of aircraft types having triplane wings.

| Type | Country | Date | Role | Status | Notes |
|---|---|---|---|---|---|
| Albatros Dr.I | Germany | 1917 | Fighter | Prototype | Based on the Albatros D.V biplane. |
| Albatros Dr.II | Germany | 1918 | Fighter | Prototype | Based on the Albatros D.X biplane. |
| American Flea | USA | c. 1939 | Private | Homebuilt | Triplane variant of the Mignet Pou du Ciel. Lower wing plane is all-moving ailerons. |
| Armstrong Whitworth F.K.5 | United Kingdom | 1915 | Fighter | Prototype | Never flown. Middle wing longer span than the others. |
| Armstrong Whitworth F.K.6 | United Kingdom | 1916 | Fighter | Prototype | Middle wing longer span than the others. |
| Astoux-Vedrines | France | c. 1916 | Experimental | Prototype | Wing incidence could be varied in flight. |
| Austin Osprey | United Kingdom | 1918 | Fighter | Prototype | |
| Aviatik 30.24 | Austria-Hungary | 1917 | Fighter | Prototype | Based on the Aviatik (Berg) D.I biplane. |
| Avro 547 | United Kingdom | 1920 | Transport | Prototype | 2 built. Based on the Avro 504, with a third wing added. |
| Battaille Triplane | Belgium | 1911 | | Prototype | Designed by César Battaille. Several short flights or hops. |
| Bell Oionus I | Canada | 1910 | Experimental | Prototype | Triplane variant of Bell's octahedral wing. Flown once. |
| Berliner Helicopter No.5 | USA | 1923 | Experimental | Prototype | In 1923, the Helicopter incorporated triplane wings to allow for gliding in case of an engine failure. |
| Besson H-3 | France | 1921 | Private | | or Besson MB.12 |
| Besson H-5 | France | 1922 | Transport flying boat | Prototype | |
| Besson H-6 | France | 1921 | Patrol | | Mailplane. Lower wing the largest and top wing the smallest. |
| Besson LB | France | 1919 | Patrol | | Flying boat |
| Besson HB.2 | France | | | | |
| Besson MB-10 | France | | | | |
| Besson MB-11 | France | | | | |
| Besson Hydravion école | France | 1919 | | | Flying boat, exhibited at the 1919 Paris Aero Show. |
| Blackburn Triplane | United Kingdom | 1917 | Fighter | Prototype | Pusher propeller and boom-mounted empennage to allow an upwards-firing 2-pounder recoilless gun. |
| Boeing GA-1 | USA | 1920 | Attack | Production | Heavily armoured twin. 10 ordered, not operational. |
| Bousson-Borgnis triplane | France | 1908 | | Bomber | Canard. Failed to fly. |
| Bristol Braemar | United Kingdom | 1918 | Bomber | Prototype | Mk II flown in 1919. |
| Bristol Pullman | United Kingdom | 1920 | Transport | Prototype | The Bristol Pullman 14-seat transport variant flew in 1920. |
| Bristol Tramp | United Kingdom | 1921 | Transport | Prototype | 2 built, never flown. |
| Caproni Ca.4 | Italy | 1914 | Bomber | Production | Military designation of a line of bombers which would also see airliner variants. Types include the Ca.40,41,42,43,48,51,52,58,59. |
| Caproni Ca.40 | Italy | 1914 | Bomber | Prototype | 3 built. |
| Caproni Ca.41 | Italy | 1918 | Bomber | Production | Re-engined Ca.40. |
| Caproni Ca.42 | Italy | 1918 | Bomber | Production | Re-engined Ca.41. |
| Caproni Ca.43 | Italy | 1918 | Bomber | Prototype | Floatplane variant of the Ca.4. |
| Caproni Ca.48 | Italy | 1919 | Transport | | Converted from surplus Ca.42. |
| Caproni Ca.49 | Italy | 1919 | Transport | Project | Seaplane. |
| Caproni Ca.51 | Italy | | Bomber | | Ca.42 variant with biplane tail and tail gun. |
| Caproni Ca.52 | Italy | 1918 | Bomber | Production | Ca.42 built for the RNAS. Six built. |
| Caproni Ca 53 | Italy | 1917 | Bomber | Prototype | 1 completed, never flown. Preserved in the Gianni Caproni Museum of Aeronautics. |
| Caproni Ca.54 | Italy | 1919 | Transport | | Conversion of the Caproni Ca 53. |
| Caproni Ca.55 | Italy | 1920 | Transport | | Seaplane derived from the Caproni Ca 54. |
| Caproni Ca.58 | Italy | | Transport | | Ca.48 re-engined with Fiat A.14 or Isotta Fraschini V.6. |
| Caproni Ca.59 | Italy | | Transport | Project | Designation of Ca.58 intended for customers outside Italy. |
| Caproni Ca.60 | Italy | 1921 | Transport | Prototype | The "Noviplano" was a triple tandem triplane which crashed on its maiden flight. |
| Caproni-Pensuti triplane | Italy | 1920 | Private | | |
| Catron & Fisk CF-10 | USA | c. 1925 | Transport | | |
| Curtiss 18-T | USA | 1918 | Fighter | Production | Known variously as the "Wasp" and the "Kirkham". |
| Curtiss Autoplane | USA | 1917 | Private | Prototype | Flying car. Flew only short hops. |
| Curtiss BT | USA | 1917 | Utility | Prototype | Seaplane, referred to as the "Flying lifeboat" or "Baby T". |
| Curtiss Model FL | USA | 1917 | | Prototype | Flying boat comprising Model F hull with Model L wings. |
| Curtiss GS-1 | USA | 1918 | Fighter | Prototype | Floatplane. |
| Curtiss Model L | USA | 1916 | Trainer | Production | Landplane and floatplane variants. |
| Curtiss Model S | USA | 1917 | Fighter | Production | S-4 and S-5 were floatplanes. |
| Curtiss Model T | USA | 1916 | Patrol | Prototype | Flying boat. Known as the "Wanamaker" |
| Curtiss-Judson Triplane | USA | 1917 | Utility flying boat | Operational | Flying boat. Slightly enlarged triplane version of the standard Curtiss F-Boat. |
| Curiss-Cox racer | USA | 1921 | Private | Operational | Also called the "Cactus kitten", a one-off triplane conversion of Cox's "Texas wildcat". |
| Dorand 1908 triplane | France | 1908 | | Prototype | Military triplane. |
| Dufaux triplane | Switzerland | 1908 | Experimental | Prototype | Tandem triplane with biplane tail and tiltrotor. Failed to fly. |
| Dunne-Huntington Triplane | UK | 1910 or 1911 | Experimental | Prototype | Not strictly a triplane but a three-surface aircraft, having a pair of tandem wings with a third set above and between them, but referred to as a "triplane" by its designer, J. W. Dunne. |
| DFW T.34 II | Germany | 1917 | Fighter | Prototype | |
| Ellehammer triplane | Denmark | 1907 | Experimental | Prototype | First powered triplane to fly. |
| Euler Dreidecker Type 1 | Germany | 1916 | Trainer | Prototype | |
| Euler Dreidecker Type 2 | Germany | 1917 | Fighter | Prototype | Later modified as a biplane. |
| Euler Dreidecker Type 3 | Germany | 1917 | Fighter | Prototype | Later modified as a biplane. |
| Euler Dreidecker Type 4 | Germany | 1918 | Fighter | Prototype | |
| Euler Dreidecker Type 5 | Germany | 1918 | Fighter | Prototype | Triplane variant of the Euler Vierdecker quadruplane. |
| Faccioli Triplane | Italy | 1909 | Experimental | Prototype | Crashed after a short hop. |
| Farman Voisin | France | 1908 | Experimental | Prototype | Original Voisin machine modified to a triplane. |
| Felixstowe Fury | United Kingdom | 1918 | Long-range flying boat | Prototype | Flying boat. Also known as the Porte Super-Baby |
| Fokker Dr.1 | Germany | 1917 | Fighter | Production | Braced variant of the V.4, first flown as the V.5 |
| Fokker V.4 | Germany | 1917 | Fighter | Prototype | Cantilever wings. |
| Fokker V.6 | Germany | 1917 | Fighter | Prototype | |
| Fokker V.8 | Germany | 1917 | Fighter | Prototype | Tandem design, having a triplane fore wing, biplane rear wing and monoplane tail stabiliser. |
| Friedrichshafen FF.60 | Germany | 1918 | Experimental | Prototype | Floatplane |
| Goupy No.1 | France | 1908 | Experimental | Prototype | |
| Grade triplane | Germany | 1908 | Experimental | Prototype | Hans Grade. first German-built aeroplane to fly |
| Groos triplane | France | 1909 | Experimental | Prototype | Alfred Groos' second design was a triplane which failed to fly. |
| Hansa-Brandenburg CC Triplane | Germany | 1917 | Fighter | Prototype | Seaplane. One-off triplane variant of production biplane. |
| Hansa-Brandenburg L.16 | Germany | 1917 | Fighter | Prototype | |
| Hansa-Brandenburg W.17 | Germany | 1917 | Fighter | Prototype | Seaplane. Cantilever bottom wing. |
| Labourdette-Halbronn H.T.1 | France | 1918 | Bomber | Prototype | 1 flown. Twin-hulled flying boat. |
| Labourdette-Halbronn H.T.2 | France | 1919 | Bomber | Prototype | 2 flown. Development of the H.T.1 |
| Levy-Besson Alerte | France | 1917 | Patrol | Production | Flying boat. Centre wing longer than the others. 100 built, used for patrol and ASW bombing rather than the "Alerte" role. |
| Levy-Besson 450-hp | France | 1918 | | | Flying boat |
| Levy-Besson 300-hp | France | c. 1918 | | | Flying boat. Under construction in 1918 |
| Levy-Besson 500-hp | France | c. 1918 | | | Flying boat never completed? |
| Levy-Besson High Seas | France | c. 1919 | | Production | Flying boat. Production batch of 100 was cancelled after some had been completed. Top and centre wings of equal span, bottom wing shorter. |
| Levy Besson HB.2 | France | 1919 | | | |
| LFG Roland D.IV | Germany | 1917 | Fighter | Prototype | Also known as the Dr. I. |
| Lloyd 40.08 Luftkreuzer | Austria-Hungary | 1916 | Bomber | Prototype | |
| Lloyd 40.15 | Austria-Hungary | 1917 | Fighter | Prototype | |
| Lohner Typ A | Austria-Hungary | 1917 | Fighter | Prototype | Later redesignated the 111.04. |
| Mitsubishi 1MT | Japan | 1922 | Bomber | Production | Navy Type 10. |
| Morane-Saulnier TRK | France | 1915 | Bomber | Prototype | 1 built. |
| Naval Aircraft Factory Giant Boat | USA | 1919 | Patrol | Prototype | Flying boat. Never completed. |
| Nieuport 10 Triplane | France | 1915 | Fighter | Prototype | Extreme backwards stagger of top plane. |
| Nieuport 17 Triplane | France | 1916 | Fighter | Prototype | Extreme backwards stagger of top plane. |
| Nieuport 17bis Triplane | France | 1917 | Fighter | Prototype | Extreme backwards stagger of top plane. |
| Nieuport London | UK | 1920 | Bomber | Prototype | Planned night bomber |
| Oeffag Type CF | Austria-Hungary | 1918 | Fighter | Prototype | |
| Parnall Possum | UK | 1923 | Experimental | Prototype | Research into centrally mounted engine. |
| Pfalz Dr-Typ | Germany | 1917 | Fighter | Prototype | Based on the Pfalz D.III biplane. |
| Pfalz Dr.I | Germany | 1918 | Fighter | Prototype | Pre-series batch of 10 delivered. |
| Pfalz Dr.II | Germany | 1918 | Fighter | Prototype | |
| Richter triplane | Germany | 1923 | Private | Prototype | Hang-glider. One of several types flown by Hans Richter having varying numbers of planes. |
| Rodjestveisky triplane | Russia | 1911 | Experimental | Prototype | |
| Roe I Triplane | United Kingdom | 1909 | Experimental | Prototype | Has been described as a tandem triplane due to its relatively large triplane aft plane. |
| Roe II Triplane | United Kingdom | 1910 | Experimental | Prototype | 2 built. |
| Roe III Triplane | United Kingdom | 1910 | Private | Production | Small number sold. |
| Roe IV Triplane | United Kingdom | 1910 | Experimental | Prototype | |
| Sablatnig SF.4Dr | Germany | 1917 | Fighter | Prototype | Floatplane. Redesigned triplane variant of the SF.4 biplane. |
| Schukowski KOMTA | Soviet Union | 1922 | Bomber | | |
| Schütte-Lanz Dr.I | Germany | 1917 | Fighter | Prototype | |
| Siemens-Schuckert Dr.I | Germany | 1917 | Fighter | Prototype | |
| Siemens-Schuckert DDr.I | Germany | 1917 | Fighter | Prototype | |
| Sopwith Cobham | United Kingdom | 1919 | Bomber | Prototype | 3 flown |
| Sopwith Hispano-Suiza Triplane | United Kingdom | 1916 | Fighter | Prototype | 2 flown. |
| Sopwith L.R.T.Tr. | United Kingdom | 1916 | Fighter | Prototype | Combined escort fighter and airship interceptor. |
| Sopwith Rhino | United Kingdom | 1917 | Bomber | Prototype | 2 flown |
| Sopwith Snark | United Kingdom | 1919 | Fighter | Prototype | 3 flown |
| Sopwith Triplane | United Kingdom | 1916 | Fighter | Production | First military triplane in service. |
| Stringfellow triplane | United Kingdom | 1868 | Experimental | Project | John Stringfellow showed his design at the world's first aeronautical exhibition, at the Crystal Palace, London. |
| Tarrant Tabor | United Kingdom | 1919 | Bomber | Prototype | Crashed on its maiden flight. |
| Voisin Triplane | France | 1916 | Bomber | Prototype | 3 flown |
| Witteman-Lewis XNBL-1 | USA | 1923 | Bomber | Prototype | Also known as "Barling Bomber". Same designer as Tabor. |
| W.K.F. 80.05 | Austria-Hungary | 1917 | Fighter | Prototype | |
