= CA60 =

CA60, CA-60, or CA 60 may refer to:

- California State Route 60
- Calcium-60 (Ca-60 or ^{60}Ca), an isotope of calcium
- Caproni Ca.60, an Italian aircraft, a prototype of a flying boat
- Ōbu Station, a railway station in Ōbu, Aichi Prefecture, Japan (station code: CA60)
