= Triplane =

Aircraft wing configuration with three vertically stacked main wing surfaces

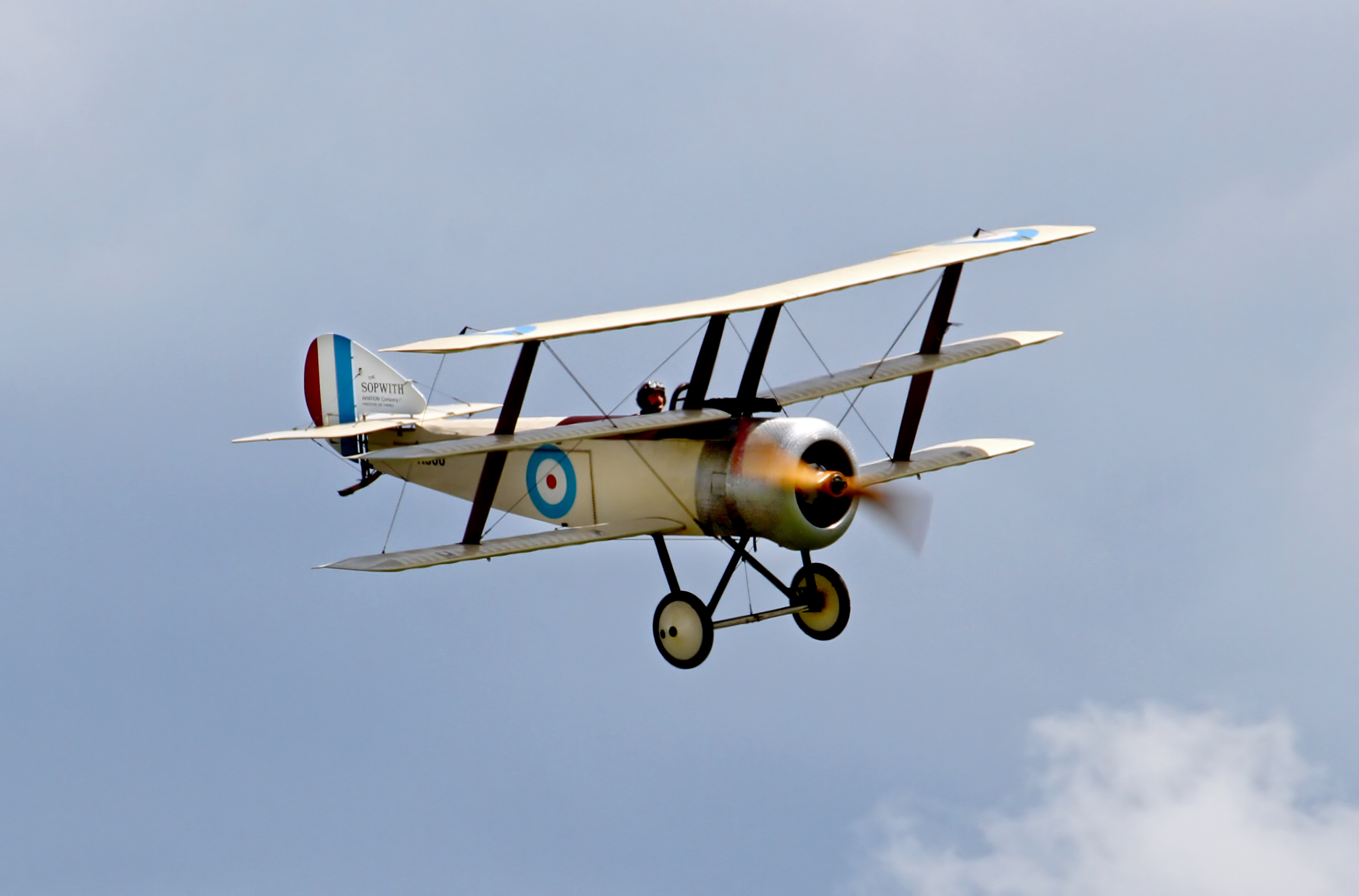
Sopwith Triplane in flight (2014)

A triplane is a fixed-wing aircraft equipped with three vertically stacked wing planes. Tailplanes and canard foreplanes are not normally included in this count, although they occasionally are.

== Design principles ==
Front view of a triplane

The triplane arrangement may be compared with the biplane in a number of ways.

A triplane arrangement has a narrower wing chord than a biplane of similar span and area. This gives each wing-plane a slender appearance with higher aspect ratio, making it more efficient and giving increased lift. This potentially offers a faster rate of climb and tighter turning radius, both of which are important in a fighter. The Sopwith Triplane was a successful example, having the same wing span as the equivalent biplane, the Sopwith Pup.

Alternatively, a triplane has reduced span compared to a biplane of given wing area and aspect ratio, leading to a more compact and lightweight structure. This potentially offers better maneuverability for a fighter, and higher load-capacity with more practical ground handling for a large aircraft type.

The famous Fokker Dr.I triplane offered a balance between the two approaches, having moderately shorter span and moderately higher aspect ratio than the equivalent biplane, the Fokker D.VI.

Yet a third comparison may be made between a biplane and triplane having the same wing plan: the triplane's third wing provides increased wing area, giving much-increased lift. The extra weight is partially offset by the increased depth of the overall structure, allowing a more efficient construction. The Caproni Ca.4 and Levy-Besson families of large, multi-engined triplanes both had some success with this approach.

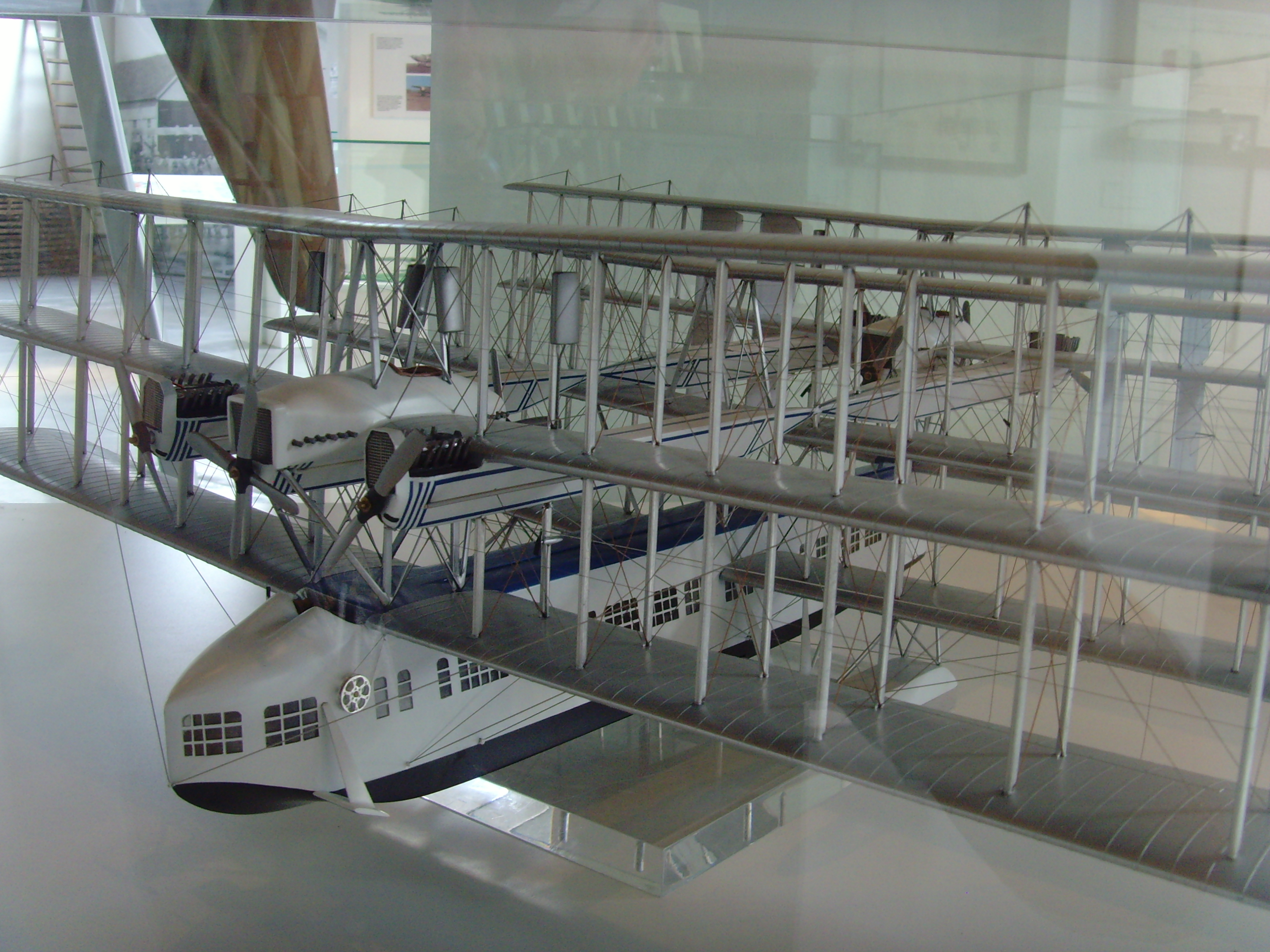
A scale model of a Caproni Ca.60 flying boat.

These advantages are offset to a greater or lesser extent in any given design by the extra weight and drag of the structural bracing and by the loss of lift resulting from aerodynamic interference between the wings in any stacked configuration. The multiplane idea was taken a step further by the quadruplane. No examples were successful, and as biplane design advanced, it became clear that the disadvantages of the triplane and quadruplane outweighed their advantages.

In a practical landplane design, the lower set of wings are typically set approximately level with the underside of the aircraft's fuselage, the middle set level with the top of the fuselage, and the top set supported above the fuselage on cabane struts. In a practical flying boat, even the lowest wing must be placed well above the waterline of the hull, creating a tall structure overall.

== History ==
The first heavier-than-air craft to carry a person in free flight was a triplane, as far back as 1848 and long before the advent of powered flight. One of the few Danish designs to fly, in 1907, and the first powered type to fly in Germany, was also a triplane. However the triplane has seldom proved a practical solution and few types have ever entered production. The majority of triplane designs emerged during a narrow period from 1908 to 1923. Besides the famous fighting triplanes of the First World War, several larger types became successful bombers, airliners and maritime patrol aircraft, sometimes as different variants of the same basic design, both during and immediately after the war. The last triplane design, privately homebuilt, was introduced shortly before the outbreak of the Second World War.

=== Pioneer years ===
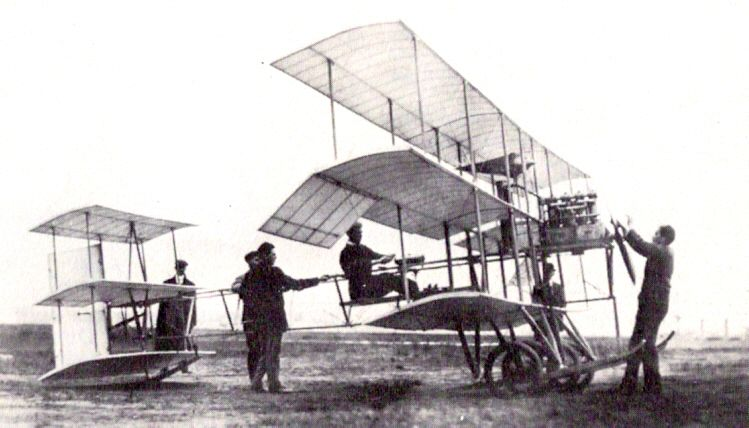
A British Roe III Triplane in the United States in September 1910 with its designer, Alliot Verdon Roe, in the cockpit.

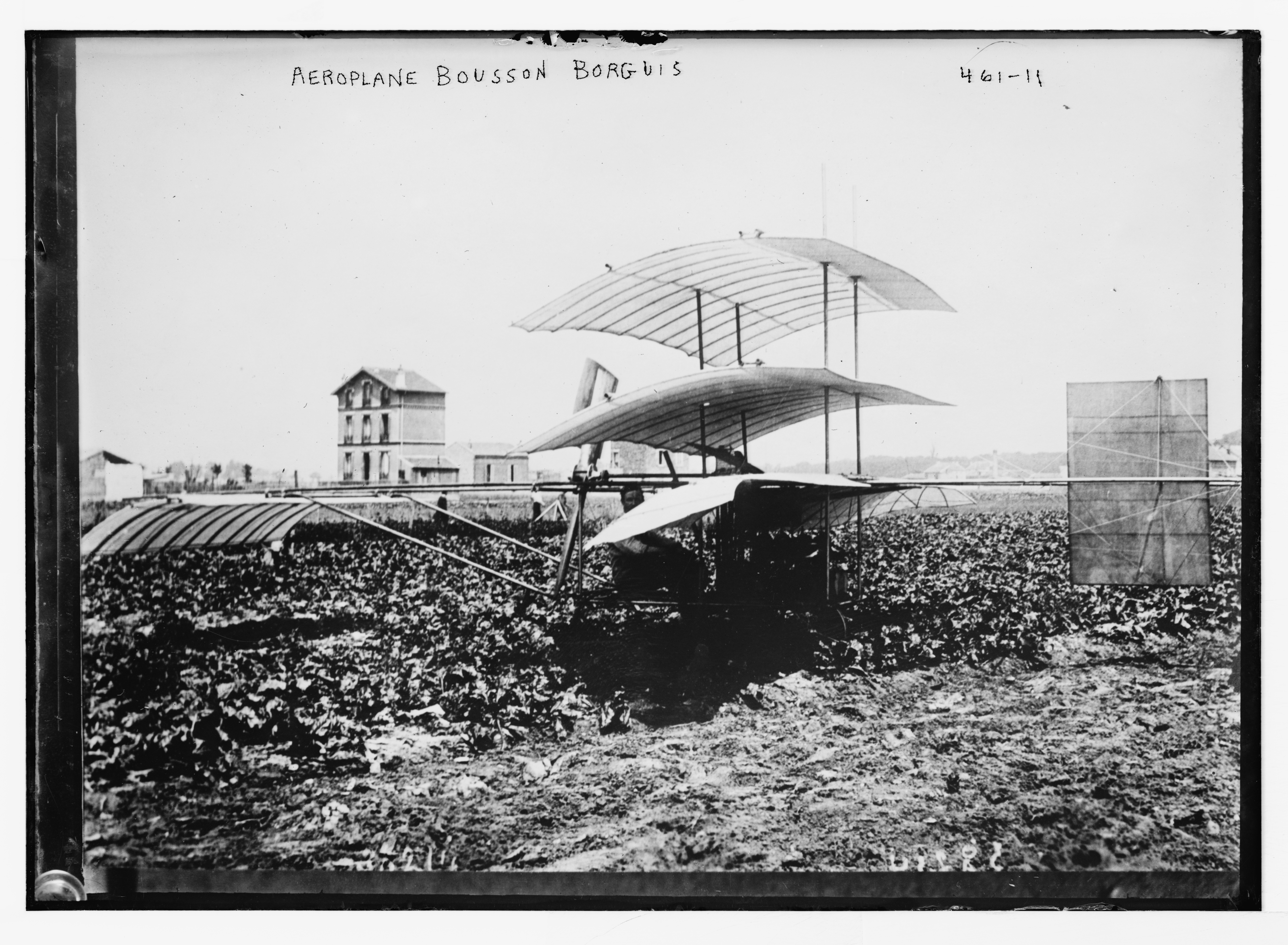
Bousson-Borgnis canard triplane

The first heavier-than-air machine to carry a human on a free, untethered flight was a triplane glider constructed by George Cayley and flown in 1848. It was modern in form, having three stacked wings above the fuselage and a separate stabilising tail with both fin and tailplane. The wings were of typical Cayley kite-like planform having a low aspect ratio. The craft was not large enough to carry an adult so a local boy was chosen as the passenger. His name is not known.

Between 1907 and 1911 a number of pioneers experimented with triplanes, some capable of flight and others not. None proved outstanding, although the series produced by A.V. Roe had some success and sold in small numbers.

In 1907 the Danish pioneer Jacob Ellehammer flew a powered triplane and would later receive a prize for flying it in Germany.

The French Bousson-Borgnis canard triplane of 1908 was a failure. The Goupy No.1, designed in 1908 by Ambroise Goupy and built by Voisin, was more successful. A few weeks after the Goupy No.1 flew, Hans Grade's triplane became the first German-built aeroplane to fly. In the same year Farman modified his original Voisin machine to triplane configuration, and Dorand constructed a military triplane.

In 1909 the American Morris Bokor constructed his own canard triplane and the Frenchman Alfred Groos constructed a triplane which failed to fly. Through 1909 and 1910 the British aviation pioneer A.V. Roe built a series of four experimental triplanes—types I, II, III and IV—and selling a small number of his Type II and III designs, before abandoning the triplane.

Alexander Graham Bell was experimenting with an "octahedral" wing design and in 1910 built a triplane example, the Oionus I, which failed to fly.

In 1911 the Belgian César Battaille constructed a triplane capable of short flights or hops, and the Russian Rodjestveisky also constructed a triplane.

=== Fighter triplanes ===
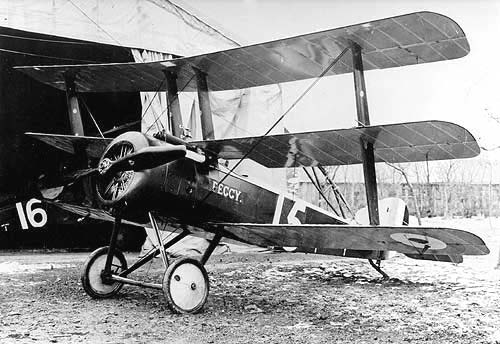
The Sopwith Triplane, the first triplane to see service in World War I.

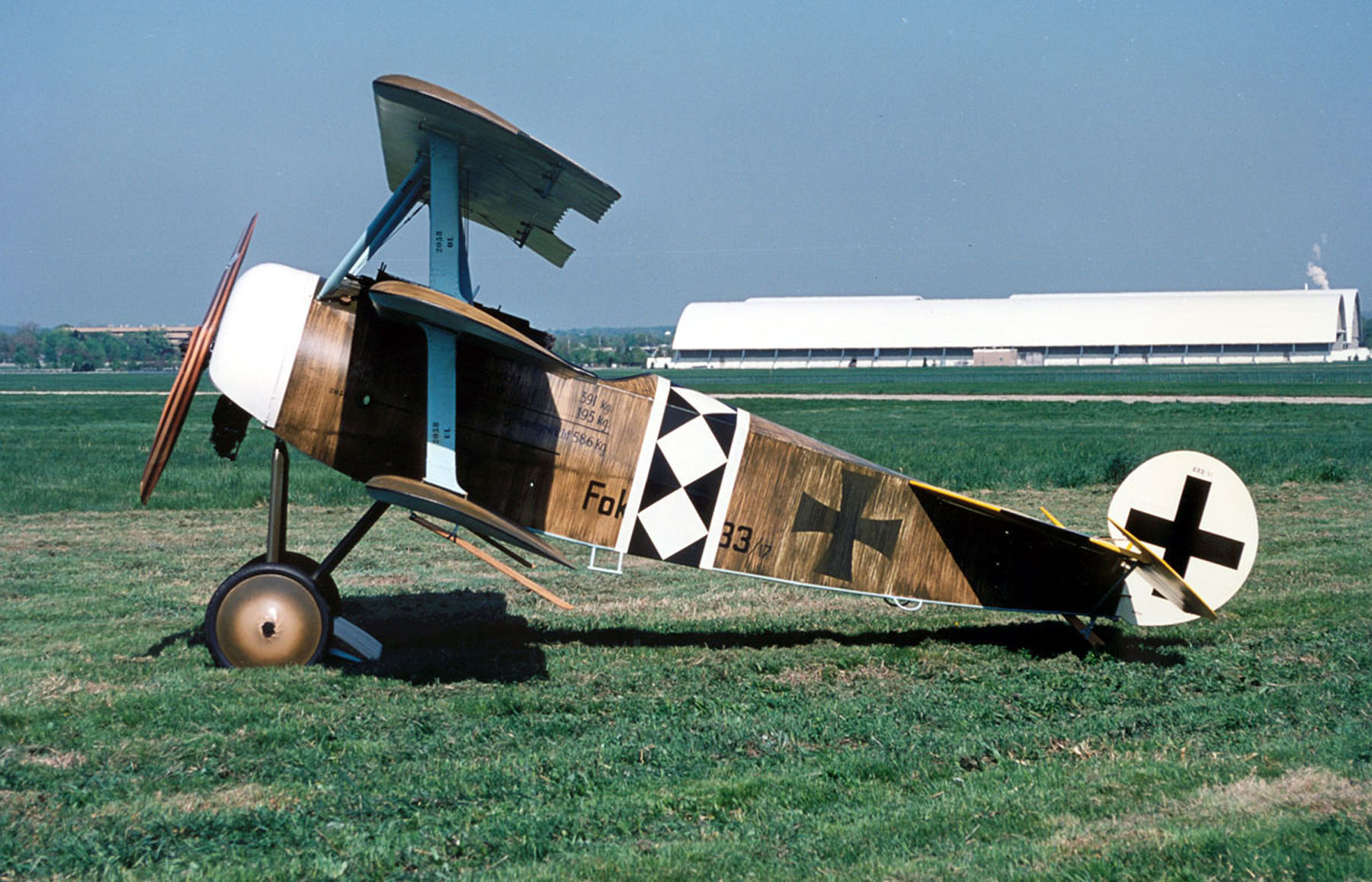
A flyable reproduction of the Fokker Dr.I of World War I, the best known triplane.

During World War I, some aircraft manufacturers turned to the triplane configuration for fighter aircraft. In practice these triplanes generally offered inferior performance to the equivalent biplane and, despite a brief vogue around 1917, only four types saw limited production.

Nieuport built a series of triplane prototypes between 1915 and 1917, featuring a top wing heavily staggered backwards to improve the pilot's view and a characteristic triangular strut arrangement bracing the three wings. The design resulted in poor handling and was eventually dropped.

Sopwith developed three different triplane designs in 1916. One, known simply as the Sopwith Triplane, went into production and became the first military triplane to see operational service. It had equal-span wings of high aspect ratio, mounted on a fuselage very similar to that of the preceding Pup biplane, and braced by one sturdy strut on each side with minimal wire bracing. The type was ordered by both the RFC and RNAS, but the RFC traded theirs for another type and the Sopwith saw service only with the RNAS, where it served with success.

The Sopwith type's performance advantage and early successes over the Albatros D.III spurred military interest in the design, especially in Germany and Austria-Hungary. A flurry of fighter prototypes were produced through 1917 and 1918, sometimes reluctantly while under pressure from the military. Examples were produced by Albatros, Aviatik, Brandenburg, DFW, Euler, Fokker, Friedrichshafen, LFG Roland, Lloyd, Lohner, Oeffag, Pfalz, Sablating, Schütte-Lanz, Siemens-Schuckert, W.K.F, in Britain by Austin and in the US by Curtiss. Only two companies, Fokker and Curtiss, would see any of their designs into production.

Fokker's V.4 prototype of 1917 (identified by some as the V.3) had unusual cantilevered wings without bracing, the uppermost wing being attached only by cabane struts to the fuselage. The wings vibrated excessively in flight and the next prototype, the V.5, featured a single interplane strut on each side, similar to the Sopwith but with no wires called shrouds. This became the prototype of the famous Fokker Dr.I triplane of 1917, which would become immortalised as the aircraft most closely identified in popular culture with Manfred von Richthofen, the "Red Baron". Although it had a good rate of climb and was highly manoeuvrable, it was not particularly fast. Following the break-up of two examples in the air, the type was withdrawn from service for strengthening, and by the time it was re-introduced, it was no longer at the forefront of performance.

Meanwhile, in the US, the Curtiss company produced many triplane designs between 1916 and 1918. Of these, several fighters and related types entered production, notably the Model L trainer (of which three examples were constructed as floatplanes) and the Model S and Model 18-T fighters. The Curtiss GS-1 prototype of 1918 was unusual in being a floatplane scout from the outset.

The performance of the fighting triplanes was soon overtaken by improved biplane fighters. However, as late as 1919 three prototype Sopwith Snarks were flown, and in 1920 and 1921 the heavily armoured Boeing GA-1 and GA-2 ground-attack triplanes proved too heavy to be useful.

=== Zeppelin killers ===
A few British designers pursued the triplane configuration in the anti-Zeppelin role. From 1915, Armstrong Whitworth developed the F.K.5 and F.K.6 prototypes. These were large three-seat types with twin engines and the middle wing of noticeably longer span than the others. Then in 1917 Blackburn produced their single-seat triplane. It was something of a throwback, featuring a pusher propeller and boom-mounted empennage in the manner of an earlier era. The arrangement was intended to allow fitting of an upwards-firing 2-pounder recoilless gun in the forward fuselage. Neither type progressed beyond the prototype stage.

=== Bombers, transports and patrol ===
The French began experimenting with bomber designs in 1915. The Morane-Saulnier TRK and Voisin Triplane prototypes of 1915 and 1916 were not successful. The Voisin design was unusual in having a subsidiary tail boom above the fuselage, helping to support the empennage. French triplanes had more success in the long-range maritime role. Labourdette-Halbronn produced a twin-hulled triplane torpedo bomber prototype, the H.T.1, in 1918 and two prototypes of a modified H.T.2 version in 1919. Besson designed several triplane flying boats between ca. 1917 and 1919, initially in partnership with Levy. The Levy-Besson Alerte of 1917 featured a central wing of greater span than the others and many examples were used for ASW and patrol duties. Their last such design, the 1919 Levy-Besson High Seas had the top wing extended to the same span as the central wing and was also ordered into production, although the run was cancelled after relatively few had been delivered. Besson split from Levy and created his own Besson LB maritime patrol flying boat in the same year, and also the Besson Hydravion école which he exhibited at the Paris 1919 Air Show. He later developed a number of smaller designs for other roles, including Besson H-6 mail plane flown in 1921.

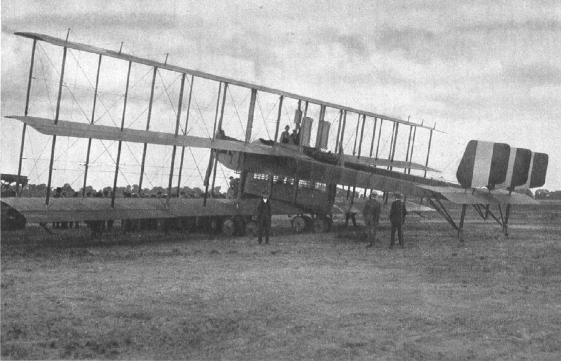
A Caproni Ca.48 airliner.

The Italian Caproni Ca.4 of 1917 was another successful design and entered service with the Italian air force as a heavy bomber in 1918. Many further variants were produced, both during and after the war. Caproni later re-numbered many of these variants as new types, including the Ca.48 airliner. In Italy's first commercial aviation disaster and one of the earliest – and, at the time, deadliest – airliner accidents, a Ca.48 crashed while flying over Verona, Italy, on August 2, 1919, killing everyone on board (between 14 and 17 people). The unsuccessful Caproni Ca.60 prototype transatlantic seaplane had three sets of triplane wings taken from the Ca.4, making nine wings in all, and is generally classified as a multiplane.

Among the many large seaplane designs produced in the US by Curtiss between 1916 and 1918, several were triplanes, however none entered production, including the Wanamaker Triplane prototype.

Britain, too, gained its first triplane bomber in 1917 with the single-engined Sopwith Rhino. It was not a success and the Sopwith Cobham, the only twin-engined type that Sopwith ever produced, fared little better two years later. From 1918, the British company Bristol developed a series of heavy triplanes which, like the Caproni design, appeared in different variants aimed at different roles. The first was the Bristol Braemar bomber, flying in 1918 with the Mk II version in 1919. The Bristol Pullman 14-seat transport variant flew in 1920. This was followed by two examples of a new, larger design for a military freighter known as the Bristol Tramp. The Tarrant Tabor, another and much larger British bomber, was built with three wings to carry the six engines required—four more-powerful engines being unavailable. The power imbalance due to the high mounting caused the Tabor to crash on its maiden flight in 1919. Its designer Walter Barling went on to design the similar-sized American Witteman-Lewis XNBL-1 triplane, known as the "Barling Bomber", which first flew in 1923. On a smaller scale, the Avro 547 airliner was a modified Avro 504 with an extra wing. Two were built, of which the first flew in 1920. It was sold to Queensland and Northern Territory Aerial Services but proved unsuited to the tough conditions in the Australian Outback. Britain's only triplane contribution to the maritime arena was the Felixstowe Fury prototype of 1918, also known as the Porte Super-Baby.

Almost as late as the Barling Bomber, in 1922 the Japanese flew the Mitsubishi 1MT torpedo bomber. It entered production as the Navy Type 10.

=== The racing triplanes ===
After World War I, several examples of the Curtiss 18-T were used for racing. An 18T-2 nearly won the Curtiss Marine Trophy Race in 1922 (limited to U.S. Navy pilots), but pilot Sandy Sanderson ran out of fuel just before the finish line.

In 1921 the "Cactus Kitten" racing triplane was created by modifying the "Texas Wildcat 2" biplane (which in turn was a modification of the monoplane "Texas Wildcat" monoplane), thus becoming the only design in history to have gone from monoplane to biplane to triplane configuration. Also referred to as the Curtiss-Cox racer, being designed and sponsored by Cox from Texas and powered by a 435 hp (324 kW) Curtiss C-12 engine, the Cactus Kitten had a wingspan of 20 ft (6 m). In the 1922 Pulitzer race it came 2nd behind a Curtiss biplane. In its triplane configuration it surpassed its monoplane and biplane antecedents in handling and speed and, for a brief period in 1922, the triplane was once again being noticed with the Kitten being touted as the world's fastest plane and being capable of surpassing 200 miles per hour. The same year it was donated to the Navy and used as a trainer for the 1922 Pulitzer race, fame having proven very fleeting.

In 1927 a Catron & Fisk CF-10 twin-engined 22-seat airliner was modified with additional fuel tanks and updated engines and named the Pride of Los Angeles. The intention was to enter the Dole Air race, but an in-flight incident caused the aircraft to crash before the race started.

=== Private aviation ===
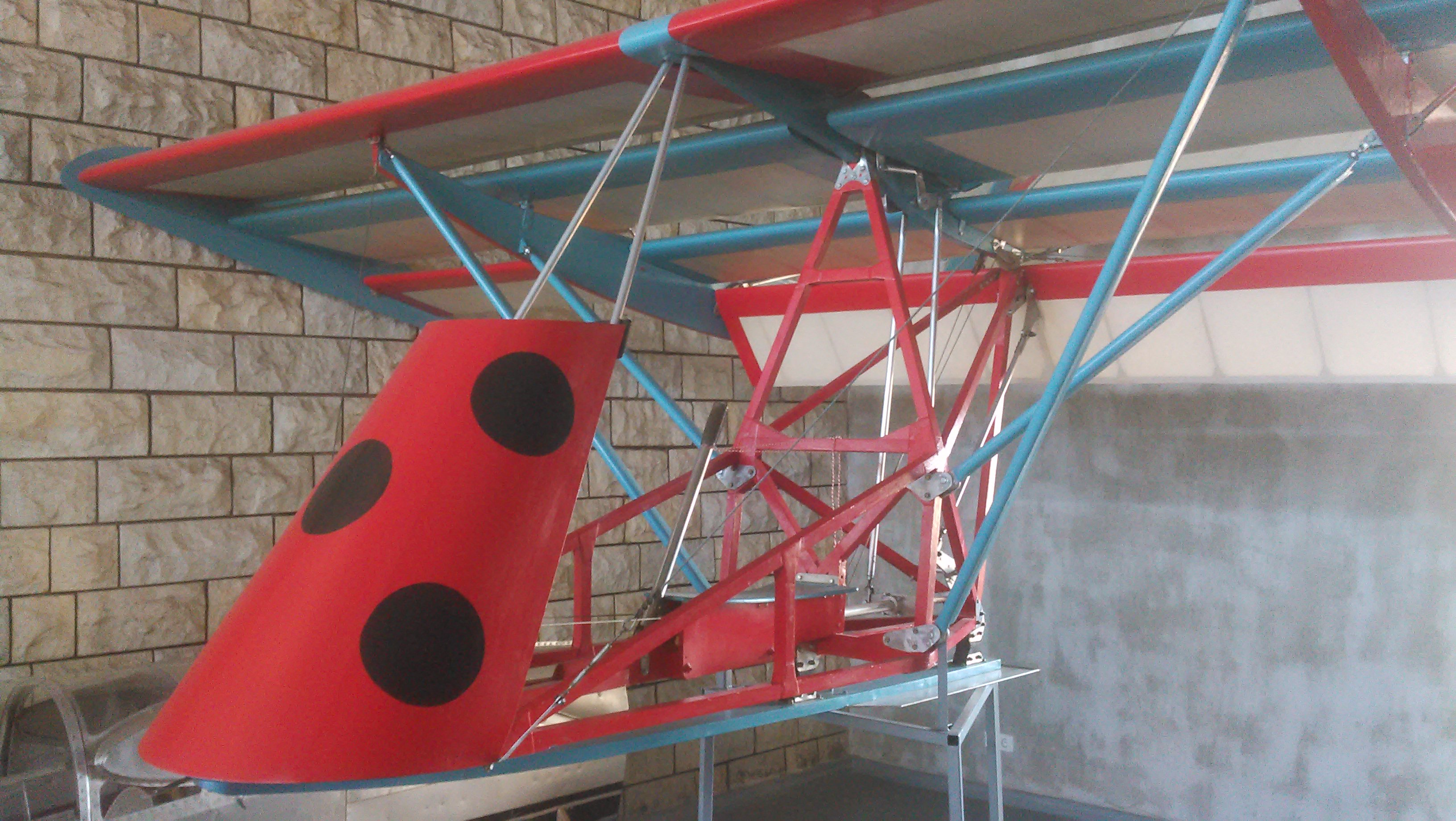
Triplane glider BrO-18 Boružė by Br. Oškinis, 1975. Lithuanian Aviation Museum

Some triplanes have been developed for private use. Perhaps the most unusual was the 1917 Curtiss Autoplane, a triplane flying car. The same year, the more conventional Curtiss-Judson Triplane, a one-off and slightly enlarged triplane variant of the Curtiss Model F, was sold for private use.

After the war, in France the Besson H-3 private tourer flew in 1921. And in 1923 the German hang-glider enthusiast Hans Richter flew a triplane variant.

Following the craze for the homebuilt tandem-wing Mignet Pou du Ciel (Flying Flea), a triplane variant, the American Flea, was produced in America around 1939. In this variant the top wings were fixed and the bottom wing acted as all-flying ailerons.

In 1975 a triplane glider, titled BrO-18 "Boružė" (lith. Ladybird) was built in then-Soviet Lithuania by Bronius Oškinis. The aircraft having a wingspan of 4.9 meters, also earned the title of world's smallest glider at that time. Similar configuration was used in hydro-glider BrO-17V "Antelė" (Lith. Duckling).

== Tandem triplanes ==
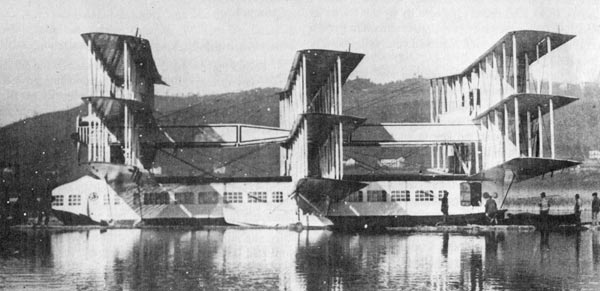
The Caproni Ca.60 Noviplano in 1921.

A tandem triplane has two sets of triplane wings, fore and aft. Few have been made.

The Dufaux triplane of 1908 was Switzerland's first native aircraft design, configured as a tandem triplane with a smaller biplane horizontal stabiliser.

The 1909 Roe I Triplane has also been described as a tandem triplane due to its relatively large triplane aft plane.

The Fokker V.8 of 1917 was another tandem design although not a true tandem triplane, having a triplane fore wing, biplane rear wing and monoplane tail stabiliser.

In 1921, the Italian Gianni Caproni mated three stacks of triplane wings from his Ca.4 series to a single fuselage in a tandem triple triplane arrangement, to create the Caproni Ca.60 Noviplano prototype transatlantic airliner. It proved unstable and crashed on its second flight.

A further example was under construction in Kansas City, Kansas, as late as 1922.

Recently, the term "tandem triplane" has been used for some new monoplane types that have active "canard" foreplane surfaces in addition to conventional wings and horizontal tailplane. A configuration having three comparable lifting surfaces in tandem is more typically referred to as a three surface aircraft, or sometimes a tandem triple or tandem triplet, and is not a triplane as such. These modern types may also be compared to the pioneer Voisin-Farman I and Curtiss No. 1 which also had a large main wing with smaller fore and aft planes; the smaller planes were not regarded as part of the main wing arrangement, and they were not described as tandem types.

== See also ==
- List of triplanes
- Multiplane (aeronautics)
- John Stringfellow
- Frederick Marriott
