= Pfalz Dr.II =

WWI German fighter

Pfalz Dr. II
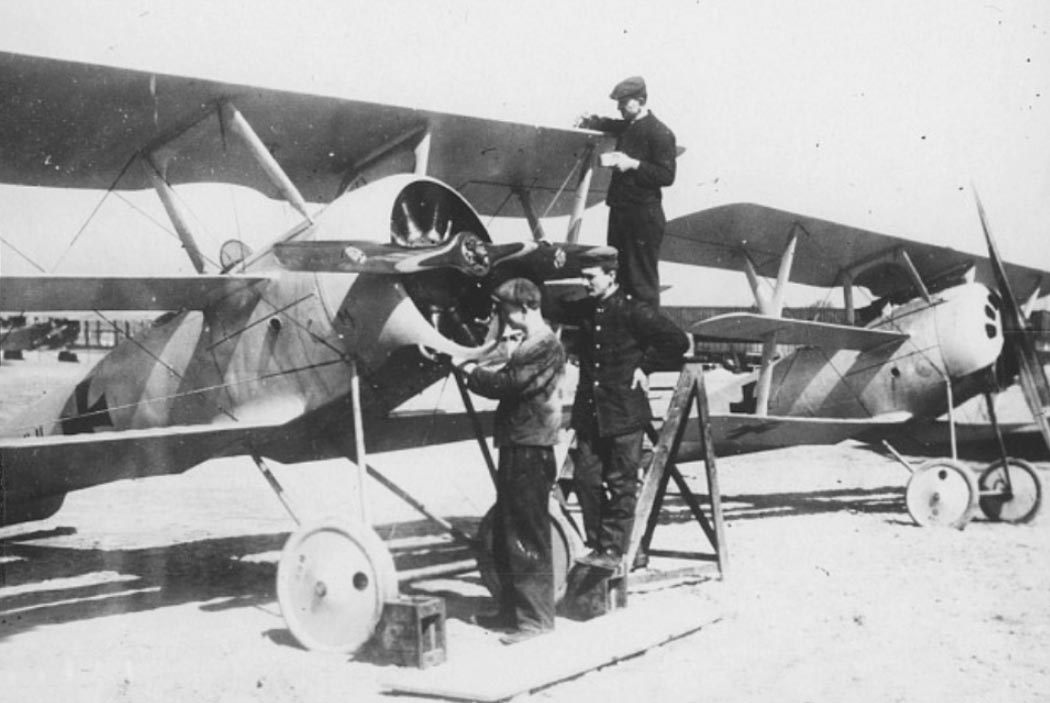
- Pfalz Dr.II (on the left side) & Pfalz Dr.I

General information
- Type: Fighter
- Manufacturer: Pfalz Flugzeugwerke
- Primary user: Luftstreitkräfte
- Number built: 2

History
- First flight: 1917

The Pfalz Dr.II was a German triplane fighter prototype of World War I built by Pfalz Flugzeugwerke.

== Development ==
The Pfalz Dr.II was a lightweight development of the Dr.I with a reduced wing area. The first prototype had a 110 hp (81 kW) Oberursel Ur II engine, and the second prototype (Dr.IIa) used a Siemens-Halske Sh I engine, which developed the same power. However, the Dr.II did not enter production.

== List of operators ==
German Empire

- Luftstreitkrafte

== Specifications (Dr.IIa) ==
Data from Angelucci

General characteristics

- Crew: 1
- Length: 5.5 m (18 ft 1 in)
- Wingspan: 7.2 m (23 ft 7 in)
- Height: 2.76 m (9 ft 1 in)
- Wing area: 17.2 m^{2} (185 sq ft)
- Empty weight: 510 kg (1,124 lb)
- Gross weight: 705 kg (1,554 lb)
- Powerplant: 1 × Siemens-Halske Sh.III 11 cylinder air-cooled rotary piston engine, 120 kW (160 hp)
- Propellers: 2-bladed fixed-pitch propeller

Performance

- Maximum speed: 190 km/h (120 mph, 100 kn) at 4,000 m (13,000 ft)
- Endurance: 1 hour 30 minutes
- Service ceiling: 6,000 m (20,000 ft)
- Time to altitude: 5,000 m (16,000 ft) in 13.5 minutes

Armament

- Guns: 2 x synchronised LMG 08/15 machine guns

== Bibliography ==
- Enzo Angelucci (1981). Rand McNally Encyclopedia of Military Aircraft, 1914-1980. Crescent. ISBN 978-0-517-41021-9.
- William Green; Gordon Swanborough (1998-12-01). Complete Book of Fighters. ISBN 978-1-85833-777-7.
- Herris, Jack (2012). Pfalz Aircraft of WWI: A Centennial Perspective on Great War Airplanes. Great War Aviation Centennial Series. Vol. 5. Charleston, SC: Aeronaut Books. ISBN 978-1-935881-12-4.
