= Shroud lines =

Thin cords or wires

In parachuting, the term shroud lines is an old name for suspension lines. Such lines are thin cords which attach the canopy to the risers.

On sailboats, shrouds are used as standing rigging to keep a mast vertical.

On biplanes and triplanes, shrouds are used as the thin wire bracing between the wings.
