= Siemens-Schuckert Dr.I =

Dr.I

General information
- Type: Triplane fighter aircraft
- National origin: Germany
- Manufacturer: Siemens-Schuckert
- Number built: 1

History
- First flight: July 1917

The Siemens-Schuckert Dr.I was a German single seat triplane fighter aircraft first flown in 1917. Its development and that of a more powerful, uncompleted variant, was abandoned after a flight test programme.

== Design and development ==
The Dr.I was a single seat triplane developed at the same time as the Siemens-Schuckert D.II. It used the flat sided fuselage of the earlier Siemens-Schuckert D.I biplane rather than that of the rounded D.II. Like the D.I the Dr.I was powered by a 110 hp (82 kW) Siemens-Halske Sh.I nine cylinder rotary engine.

The fighter was first flown in July 1917. Later in its development programme the Dr.I crashed and was seriously damaged. Siemens-Schuckert rebuilt it, though adding 2.90 m^{2} (31.2 sq ft) to the wing area.

Construction of a version powered by a more powerful 110 hp (82 kW) Siemens-Halske Sh.III eleven cylinder rotary engine, the Dr.II, was well advanced when it was abandoned.

== Specifications (before reconstruction) ==
Data from The Complete Book of Fighters p.529

General characteristics

- Crew: One
- Length: 5.30 m (17 ft 5 in)
- Wingspan: 8.60 m (28 ft 3 in)
- Wing area: 18.10 m^{2} (194.8 sq ft)
- Empty weight: 510 kg (1,124 lb)
- Gross weight: 695 kg (1,532 lb)
- Powerplant: 1 × Siemens-Halske Sh.I 9-cylinder rotary, 82 kW (110 hp)

Performance

- Time to altitude: 20.6 min to 4,700 m (15,420 ft) post-rebuild
