= Goupy No.1 =

French experimental aircraft

No.1
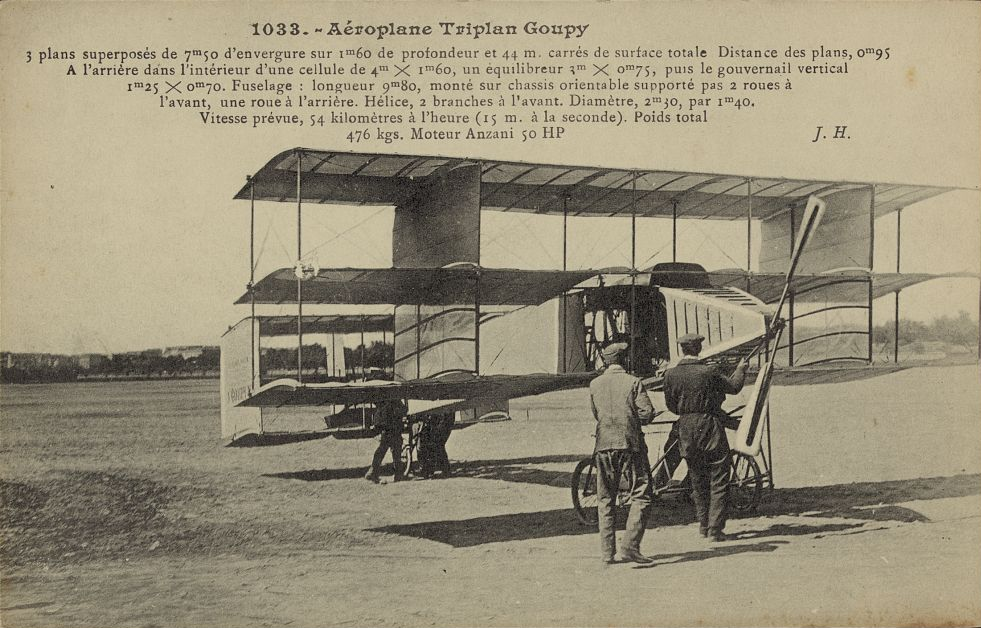

General information
- Type: Experimental aircraft
- National origin: France
- Manufacturer: Voisin
- Number built: 1

History
- First flight: 5 September 1908

The Goupy No.1, a.k.a. Goupy I bis was an experimental aircraft built in France during 1908, which on 5 September that year became the first French triplane to fly. It was designed by Ambroise Goupy and built by Aéroplanes Voisin.

Unlike previous aircraft built by Voisin, which had been pusher biplanes with a front elevator, the Goupy No.1 was a tractor triplane, with the ends of the wings connected by Voisin's characteristic "side curtains". The tailplane was a Hargrave cell in line with contemporary Voisin practice, with the addition of a pair of small moving elevators mounted on the leading edge of the outer surfaces and a central rudder. The undercarriage consisted of a single wheel mounted below the wing and a tailwheel. As originally constructed, the middle wing was mounted in a mid-wing position on the fuselage, with the top and bottom wings clear of the fuselage, and power was provided by an Antoinette engine. The design was later revised so that the bottom wing was mounted at the base of the fuselage, the middle wing to the top of the fuselage, and top wings clear of it. At the same time, the engine was changed to an Anzani of similar power and the wings extended outboard of the side curtains, and the single central mainwheel replaced by a pair of wheels.

== Specifications ==
Data from

General characteristics

- Crew: 1
- Length: 9.8 m (32 ft 2 in)
- Wingspan: 7.5 m (24 ft 7 in)
- Wing area: 44 m^{2} (470 sq ft)
- Gross weight: 476 kg (1,049 lb)
- Powerplant: 1 × Anzani , 37 kW (50 hp)
- Propellers: 2-bladed fixed-pitch propeller

Performance

- Maximum speed: 54 km/h (34 mph, 29 kn)
