= Voisin Triplane =

French WW1 bomber aircraft

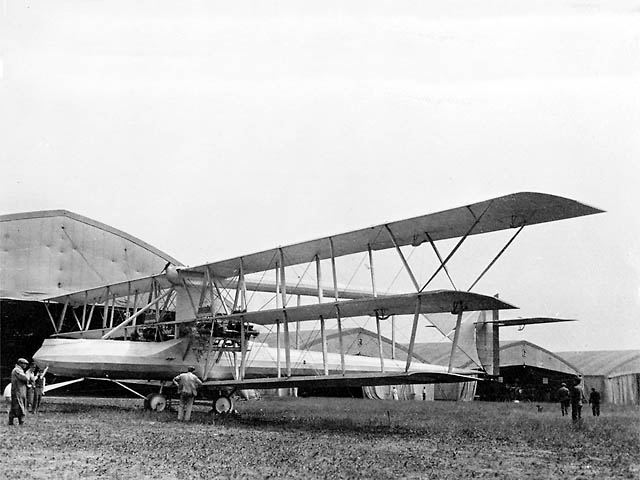
- 1916 version of the Voisin Triplane

General information
- Type: Bomber
- National origin: France
- Manufacturer: Société Anonyme des Aéroplanes G. Voisin
- Number built: 2

History
- First flight: 1915 (E.28 1919?)

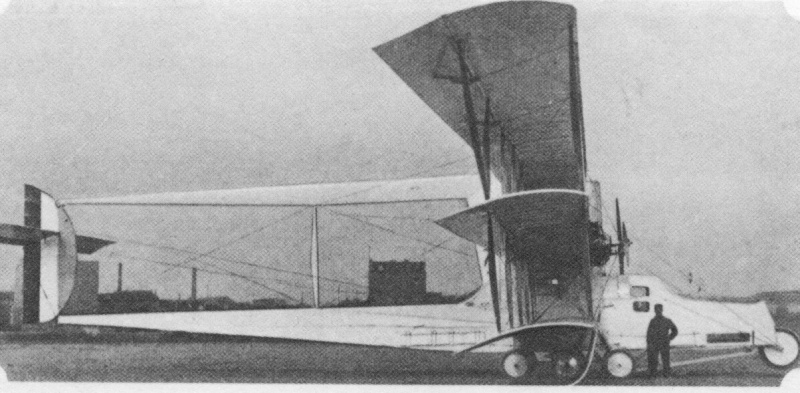
1915 Triplane

The Voisin Triplanes were large experimental bombers built by Voisin in 1915 and 1916. After unsuccessful trials of the 1915 prototype a modified version with more powerful engines was built in 1916, as the Voisin E.28, but the type did not enter production.

== Design and development ==
The Voisin 1915 Triplane had an unorthodox configuration, the tail surfaces being supported between the fuselage and an upper boom attached to the centre section of the upper wing. The four engines were installed in tandem in two nacelles on the centre wing. Two gun positions were provided, one the nose and second behind the trailing edge of the wings, firing downwards through an aperture in the fuselage.

The first aircraft built was powered by four 150 hp (110 kW) engines but performance was unsatisfactory, and a second aircraft was built, designated E.28, powered by four 200 hp (150 kW) Hispano-Suiza engines, and a redesigned circular section fuselage.

== Specifications (Voisin E.28) ==
Data from French aircraft of the First World War, Flight

General characteristics

- Crew: 4
- Length: 21.8 m (71 ft 6 in)
- Wingspan: 35.4 m (116 ft 2 in)
- Height: 5.8 m (19 ft 0 in)
- Wing area: 200 m^{2} (2,200 sq ft)
- Empty weight: 4,500 kg (9,921 lb) approximately
- Gross weight: 6,985 kg (15,399 lb)
- Powerplant: 4 × Hispano-Suiza 8Bc V-8 water-cooled piston engines, 160 kW (220 hp) each
- Propellers: 2-bladed pusher and tractor fixed-pitch propellers

Performance

- Maximum speed: 125 km/h (78 mph, 67 kn) at 2,000 m (6,600 ft)
- Service ceiling: 3,000 m (9,800 ft) approximately
- Time to altitude: 2,000 m (6,600 ft) in 25 minutes 30 seconds
- Wing loading: 34.925 kg/m^{2} (7.153 lb/sq ft)

Armament

- Guns: 2 x 37 mm (1.46 in) Hotchkiss cannon
