= Curtiss Model L =

Model L
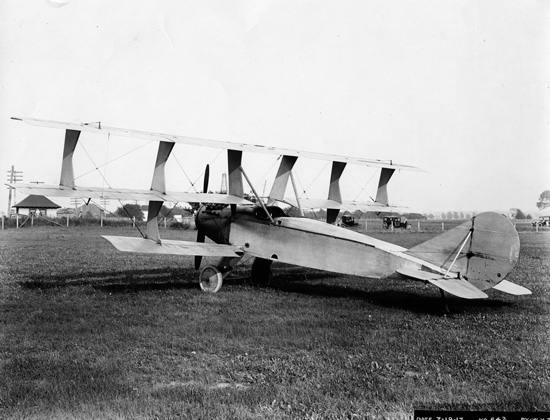

General information
- Type: Trainer
- Manufacturer: Curtiss
- Status: retired
- Primary users: US Army US Navy

History
- First flight: 1916

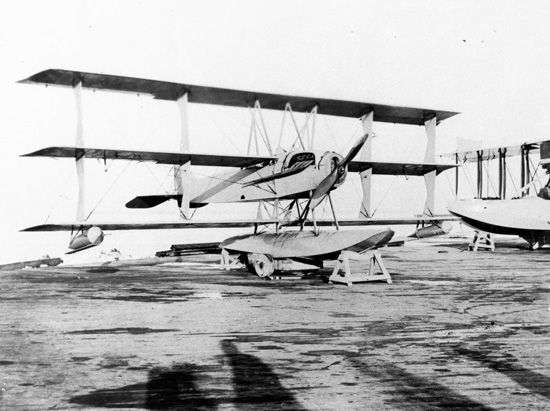
Navy Curtiss L-2 on floats

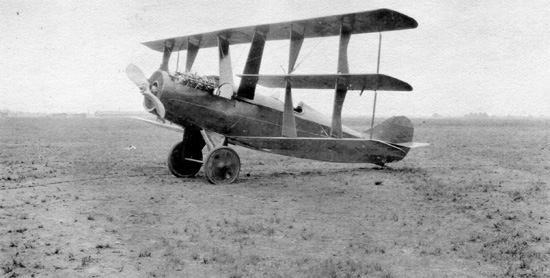
Army Curtiss L-2

The Curtiss Model L was a triplane trainer aircraft in the United States in 1916 by the Curtiss Aeroplane Company of Hammondsport, New York.

== Development ==
It was a largely conventional design with the upper two wings of equal span and a shorter-span lower wing, the Model L had a wide, open cockpit that accommodated the student and instructor side by side, an unusual feature for its time which gained the aircraft the nickname "Sociable Triplane". Apart from private sales, Curtiss sold a number to both the United States Army and Navy. These differed from their civil counterparts in having lower wings of equal span to the upper two. The three sold to the Navy were equipped as floatplanes.

The wings from one of the Army's examples were mated to the fuselage of a Curtiss Jenny to produce the single example of the X-1 trainer. Model L wings were also used by Curtiss for the creation of the Autoplane roadable aircraft, as well as being mated to a Model F hull to create the Curtiss FL.

== Variants ==
- Model L - civil trainer version
- Model L-1 - military version
- Model L-2 - military version, some equipped with floats

== Operators ==
United States

- United States Army
- United States Navy

== Specifications ==
General characteristics

- Crew: two, pilot and instructor
- Length: 18 ft 0 in (5.49 m)
- Wingspan: 25 ft 0 in (7.62 m)
- Powerplant: 1 × Curtiss OX-2 , 90 hp (67 kW)

Performance
