= Curtiss GS =

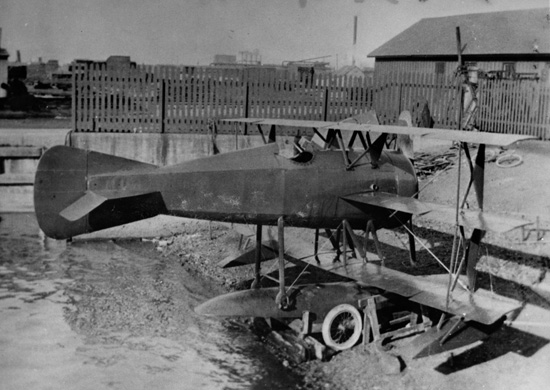
- The Curtiss GS-1 triplane

General information
- Type: Naval scout float plane
- National origin: United States
- Manufacturer: Curtiss Aeroplane and Motor Company
- Primary user: United States Navy
- Number built: 6

History
- Introduction date: 1918
- First flight: 1918

The Curtiss GS aircraft were two types of similar scout aircraft designed and built by the Curtiss Aeroplane and Motor Company for the United States Navy.

== Design and development ==
In 1917 the United States Navy ordered five scout aircraft from Curtiss, they were designated the GS for Gnome Scout, named for the French-built 100 hp (75 kW) Gnome rotary engine used to power the aircraft. The GS was a biplane with a central float and a stabiliser float at each end of the lower wing. The Navy ordered an additional aircraft as a triplane, which was designated the GS-1 and the original aircraft was retrospectively designated the GS-2. Although they were delivered to the Navy in 1918 nothing further is known about the type, other than that the GS-1 was destroyed in a landing accident on 1 April 1918.

== Variants ==
GS-1
Triplane scout floatplane, one built.
GS-2
Biplane scout floatplane, five built.

== Operators ==
United States

- United States Navy

== See also ==
Related lists

- List of flying boats and floatplanes
