= Curtiss Autoplane =

Earliest noted flying car

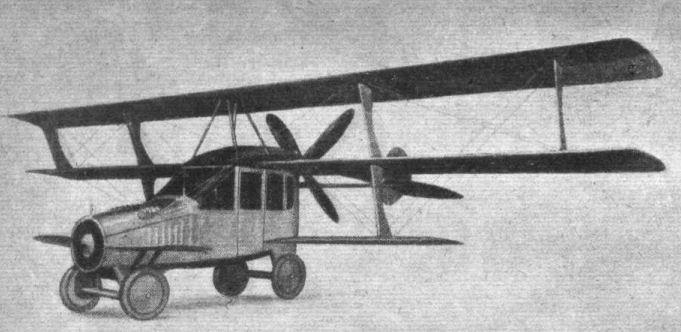
- Autoplane as shown at Pan-American Aeronautical Exposition of 1917

General information
- Type: Roadable aircraft
- National origin: United States
- Manufacturer: Curtiss
- Designer: Glenn Curtiss

The Curtiss Autoplane (also designated Curtiss Model 11) invented by Glenn Curtiss in 1917, is widely considered the first attempt to build a roadable aircraft. Although the vehicle was capable of lifting off the ground, it never achieved full flight.

== Development and design ==
The Autoplane was a triplane, using the wings from a Curtiss Model L trainer, with a small foreplane mounted on the aircraft's nose. The Autoplane's aluminum body resembled a Model T and had three seats in an enclosed cabin, with the pilot/chauffeur sitting in the front seat and the two passengers side-by side to the rear. It used a four-blade pusher propeller, and a twin-boom tail. A 100 horsepower (75 kW) Curtiss OXX engine drove the propeller via shaft and belts. The aircraft had a four-wheel undercarriage, with the front two wheels being steerable. The wings and tail could be detached for use as an automobile.

It was shown at the Pan-American Aeronautic Exposition at New York City in February 1917. It made a few short hops before the entry of the United States into World War I in April 1917 ended development of the Autoplane.

== Specifications ==
Data from Curtiss Aircraft 1907–1947

General characteristics

- Crew: 1
- Capacity: 2 passengers
- Length: 27 ft (8.2 m)
- Wingspan: 40 ft 6 in (12.34 m)
- Height: 10 ft (3.0 m)
- Powerplant: 1 × Curtiss OXX water-cooled V8 engine, 100 hp (75 kW)

Performance

- Maximum speed: 65 mph (105 km/h, 56 kn)
