= Morane-Saulnier TRK =

WW1 French prototype bomber aircraft

TRK

General information
- Type: Bomber aircraft
- Manufacturer: Morane-Saulnier
- Designer: Raymond Saulnier
- Number built: 1

History
- First flight: 1915

The Morane-Saulnier TRK (a.k.a. Morane-Saulnier MoS-9) was a prototype French bomber built during World War I.

== Design ==
The Morane-Saulnier TRK was a large triplane with the engines mounted in the fuselage, facing outboard and canted upwards. The engines drove a propeller each, through driveshafts and bevel gearboxes, with the propeller gearboxes strut mounted beneath the middle mainplanes. Cooling for the engines was provided by a tall radiator stack above the centre of the fuselage, between the middle and upper mainplanes. The two tractor propellers ran just forward of the middle mainplanes.

Two pilots sat in open cockpits side-by-side in the nose of the aircraft, which also had a wind-driven generator at the very tip. The third crew-member was housed in the rear fuselage and attended the engines in flight or operated defensive armament. The fixed undercarriage was of the conventional contemporary tail-skid type, with a nose-over protection wheel, strut-mounted under the nose. The left and right, strut-supported, mainwheel assemblies were of very wide track, with a wheel at each end of both axles.

== Specifications (TRK) ==
Data from Aviafrance : Morane-Saulnier TRK, French aircraft of the First World War

General characteristics

- Crew: 3
- Length: 16.38 m (53 ft 9 in)
- Wingspan: 20.22 m (66 ft 4 in)
- Wing area: 140 m^{2} (1,500 sq ft)
- Powerplant: 2 × Canton-Unné A9 9-cylinder water-cooled radial piston engines, 170 kW (230 hp) each

Performance Armament

- Guns: 2 x 7.7 mm (0.303 in) machine-guns
- Bombs: Bombs carried internally
