= Besson H-6 =

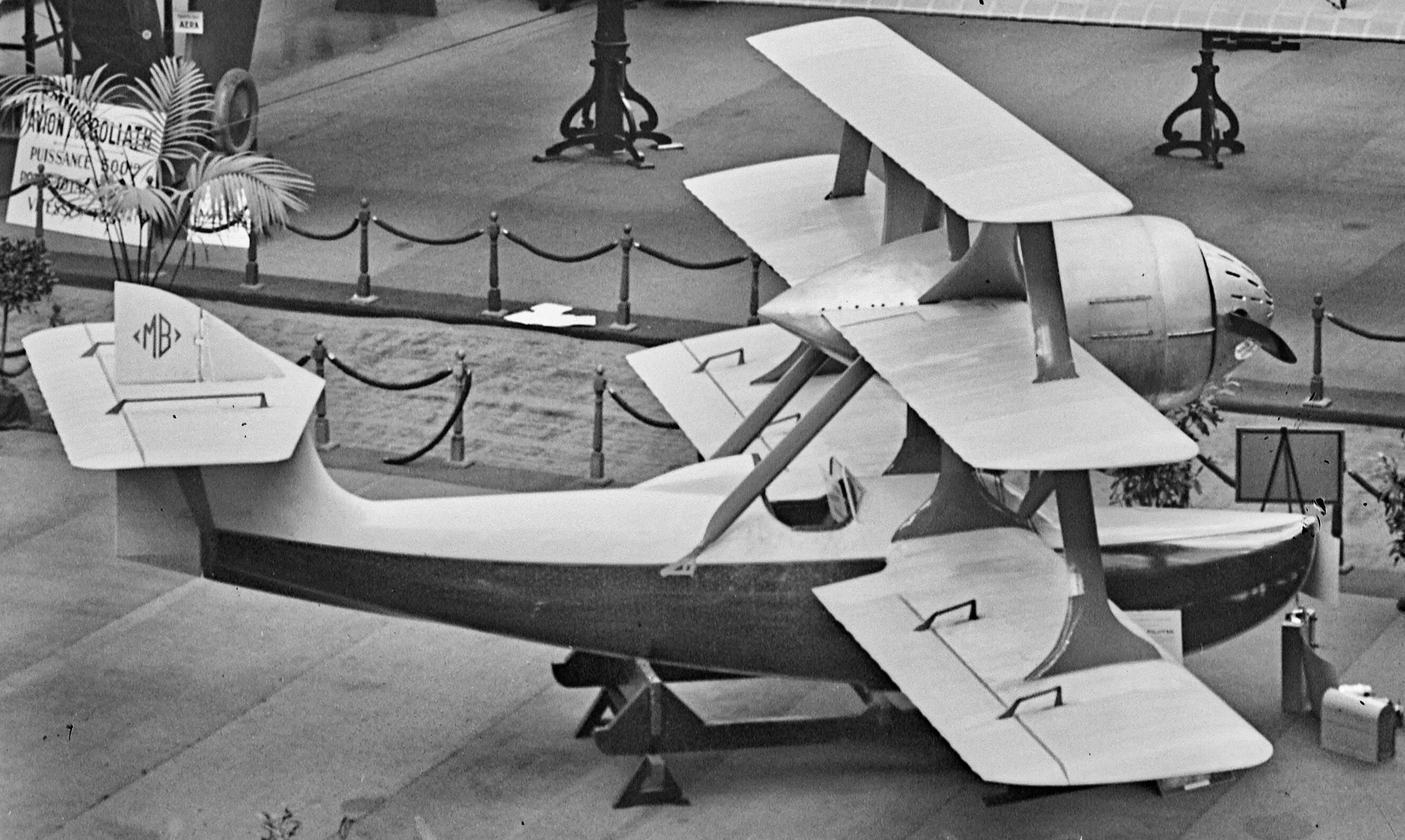
- Besson H-6 displayed at the 1921 Salon de l'Aeronautique in Paris.

General information
- Type: Single-seat postal flying-boat
- National origin: France
- Manufacturer: Marcel Besson

History
- First flight: 1921

The Besson H-6 was a French single-seat postal flying-boat designed by the Marcel Besson company of Boulogne.

== Development ==
The H-6 was a single-seat triplane flying-boat powered by a Clerget 9B radial piston engine. The engine was mounted on the leading edge of the centre wing and drove a tractor propeller.

The H-6 was displayed at the 1921 Salon de l'Aeronautique in Paris.

== Specifications ==
Data from

General characteristics

- Crew: 1
- Length: 8.20 m (26 ft 11 in)
- Wingspan: 9.25 m (30 ft 4 in)
- Height: 3.10 m (10 ft 2 in)
- Wing area: 30.0 m^{2} (323 sq ft)
- Empty weight: 600 kg (1,323 lb)
- Max takeoff weight: 864 kg (1,905 lb)
- Powerplant: 1 × Clerget 9B radial piston engine, 97 kW (130 hp)

Performance

- Maximum speed: 170 km/h (110 mph, 92 kn)
- Range: 500 km (310 mi, 270 nmi)
- Service ceiling: 3,600 m (11,800 ft)

== See also ==
Related lists

- List of flying boats and floatplanes
