= Curtiss Model S =

Model S
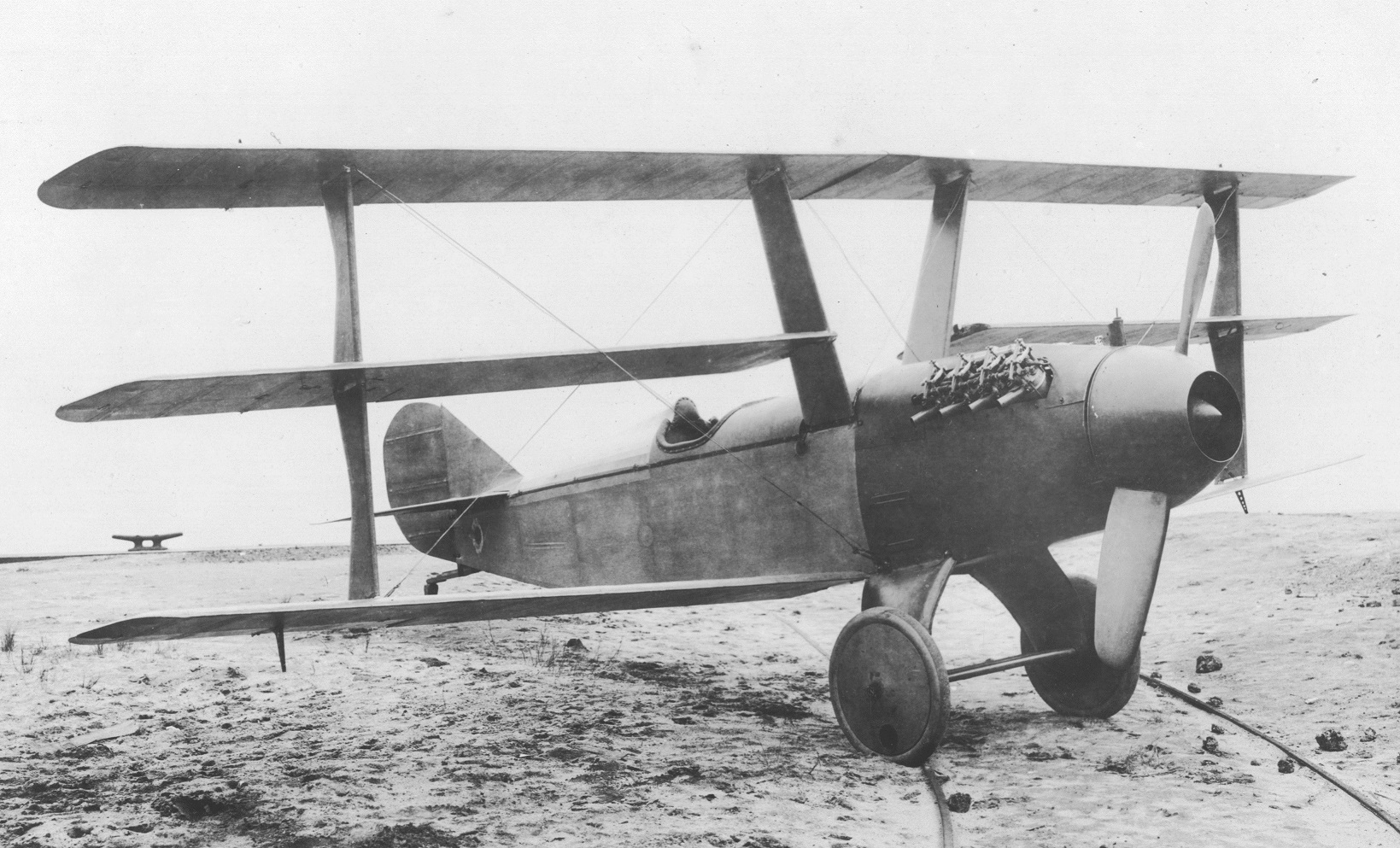
- Curtiss S-3

General information
- Type: fighter
- National origin: United States
- Manufacturer: Curtiss Aeroplane and Motor Company

The Curtiss Model S (also known as Speed Scout or Model 10) was a single-seat fighter aircraft.

== Development and design ==
The Model S was Curtiss' first attempt at a fast and maneuverable single-seat fighter. The first variant, S-1, had disappointing performance. In March 1917, new wings were attached to the S-1 fuselage and the project was redesignated S-2. In 1917, the S-3 became the first triplane in service in the United States. In 1918 and 1919, Curtiss experimented with seaplane versions of the S-3, designated S-4 and S-5. The S-6 was intended to be an improved S-3, but performance was poor and of the 12 ordered by the USASC, only 1 was delivered.

== Variants ==
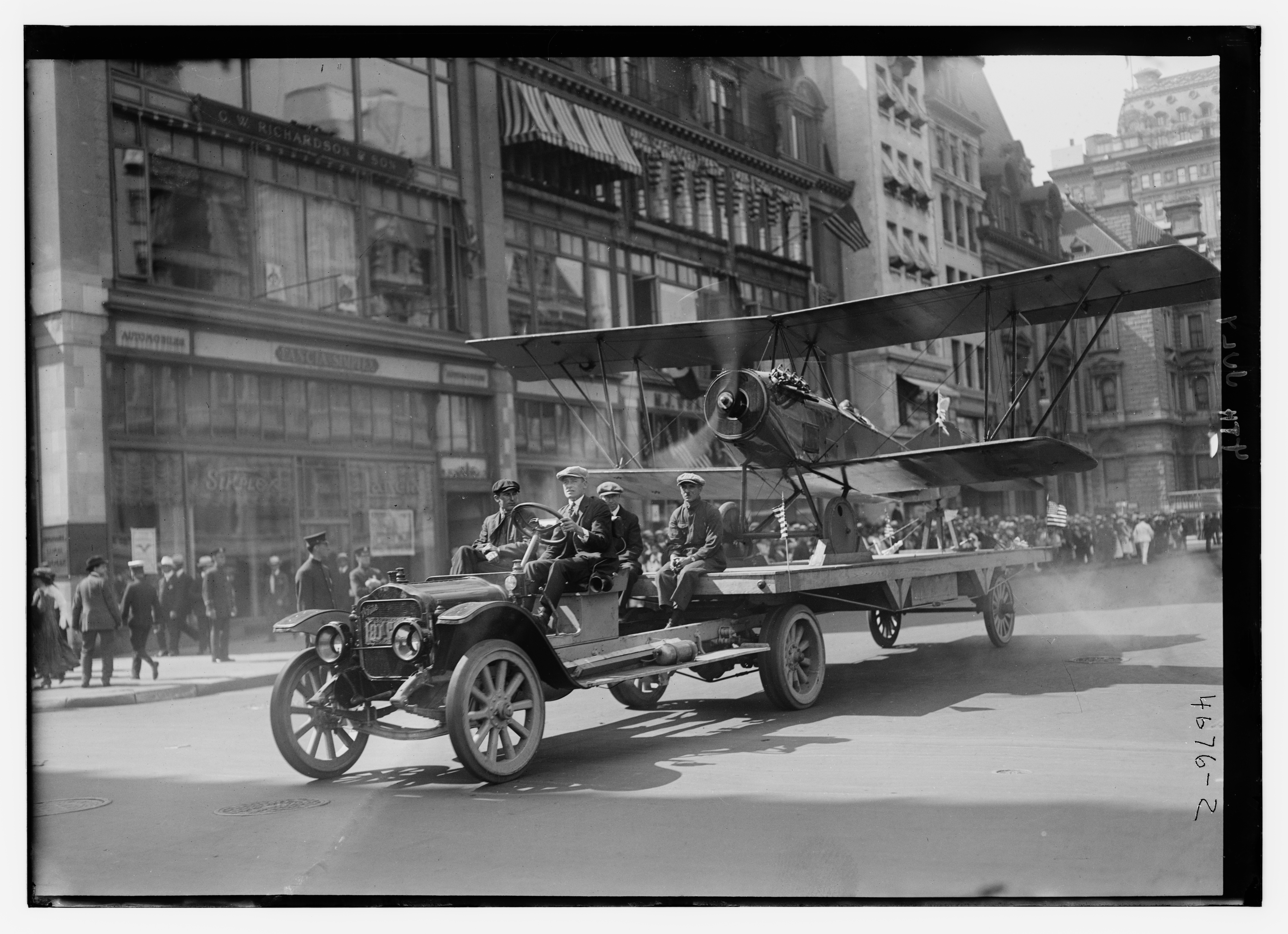
The sole Curtiss S-1 mounted on a truck for an Independence Day parade in New York City

S-1 Speed Scout
Biplane, unarmed
S-2 Wireless

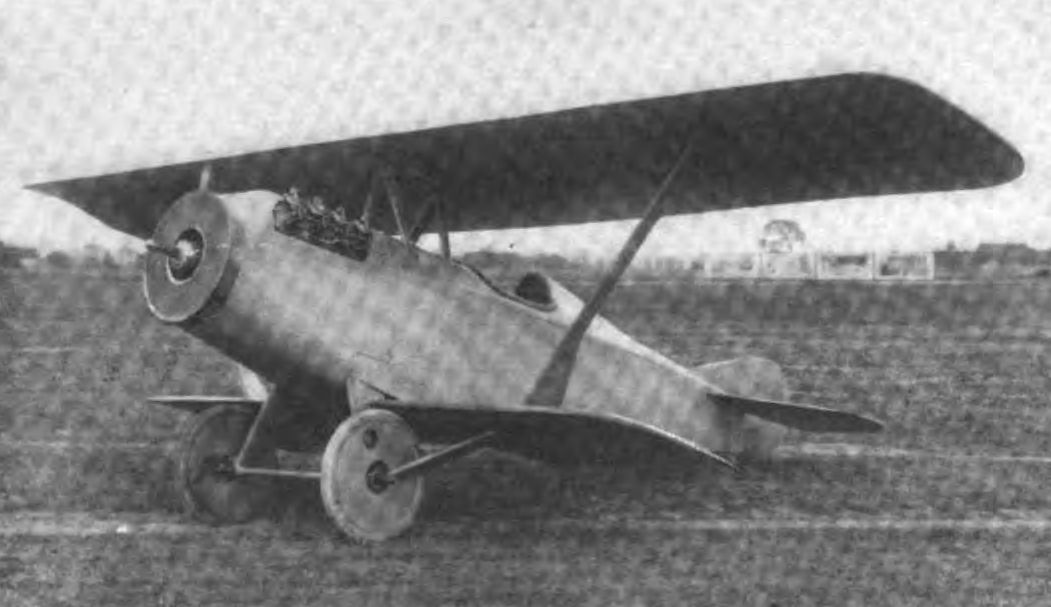
Curtiss S-2 Wireless Speed Scout. Photo from Aviation and Aeronautical Engineering August 15, 1916

Biplane, updated S-1 lacked wing wires. First flight in March 1917.
S-3
Model 10 - Triplane derived from S-2. Four built.
S-4
Model 10A - Seaplane version of S-3 with 2 main floats
S-5
Model 10B - Seaplane version of S-3 with 1 main central float and two wingtip floats.
S-6
Model 10C - Triplane, improved S-3, armed with 2 Lewis guns.

== Specifications (S-3) ==
Data from

General characteristics

- Crew: 1
- Length: 19 ft 6 in (5.94 m)
- Wingspan: 25 ft 0 in (7.62 m)
- Height: 8 ft 7 in (2.62 m)
- Wing area: 142.6 sq ft (13.25 m^{2})
- Empty weight: 970 lb (440 kg)
- Gross weight: 1,320 lb (599 kg)
- Powerplant: 1 × Curtiss OXX-3 , 100 hp (75 kW)

Performance

- Maximum speed: 115 mph (185 km/h, 100 kn)
- Service ceiling: 16,500 ft (5,029 m)
