= Besson H-3 =

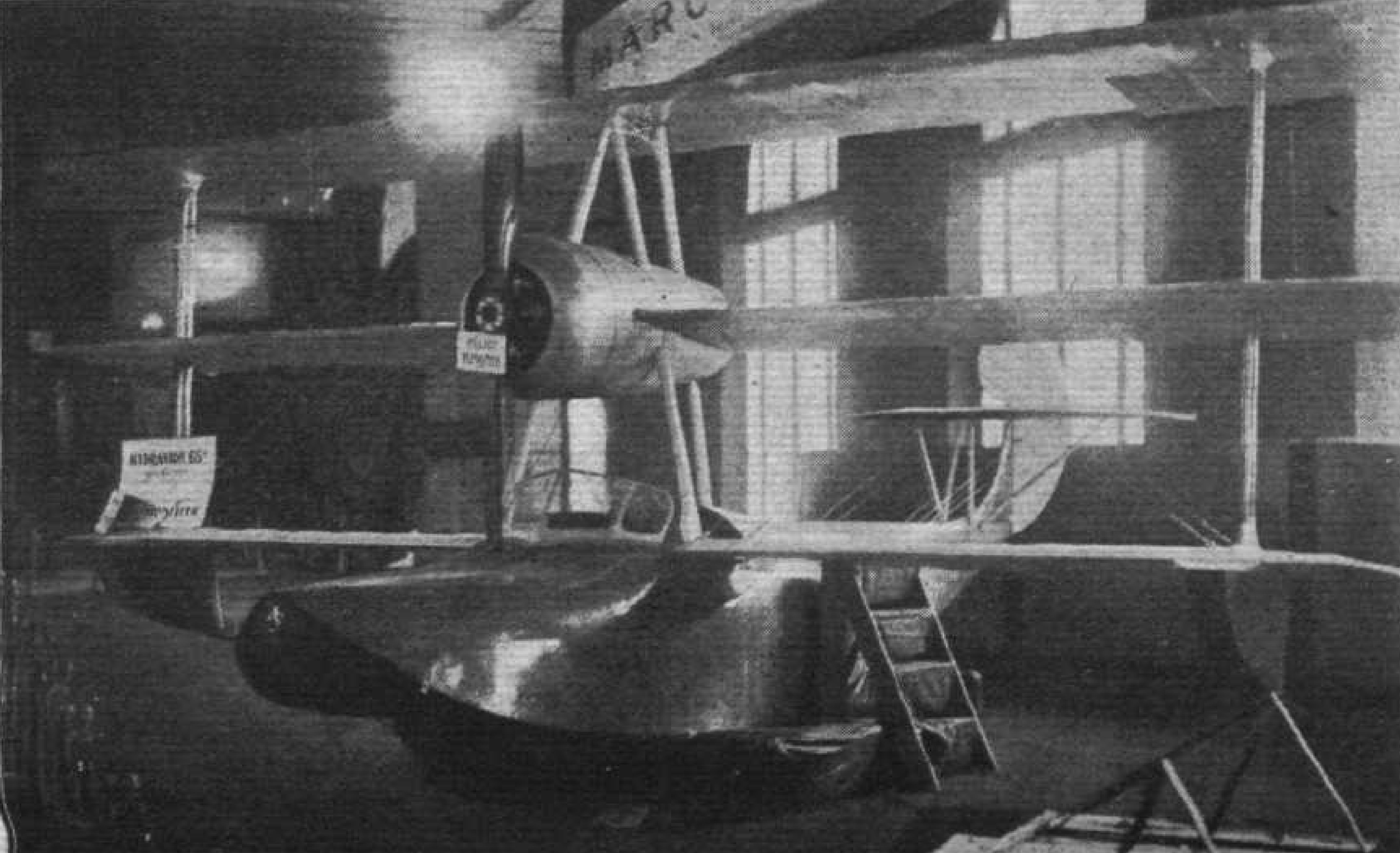

General information
- Type: Touring flying-boat
- National origin: France
- Manufacturer: Marcel Besson
- Number built: 1

History
- First flight: 1920

The Besson H-3 was a French civil touring triplane flying boat designed by the Marcel Besson company of Boulogne. One aircraft was built and the type did not enter production.

== Design and development ==
The H-3 was designed as a civil touring flying boat and had single-bay equal-span wings and room for two in a side-by-side configuration cockpit, it was fitted with dual-controls. Initially powered by a 45 kW (60 hp) le Rhône 9Z rotary, the H-3 was found to be under-powered and re-engined with a 97 kW (130 hp) Clerget 9B rotary, (from Société Clerget-Blin et Cie), driving a tractor propeller. The aircraft did not enter production and the sole H-3 was re-designated MB-12 in 1922 when it was modified with an enlarged central wing.

== Specifications (H-3) ==
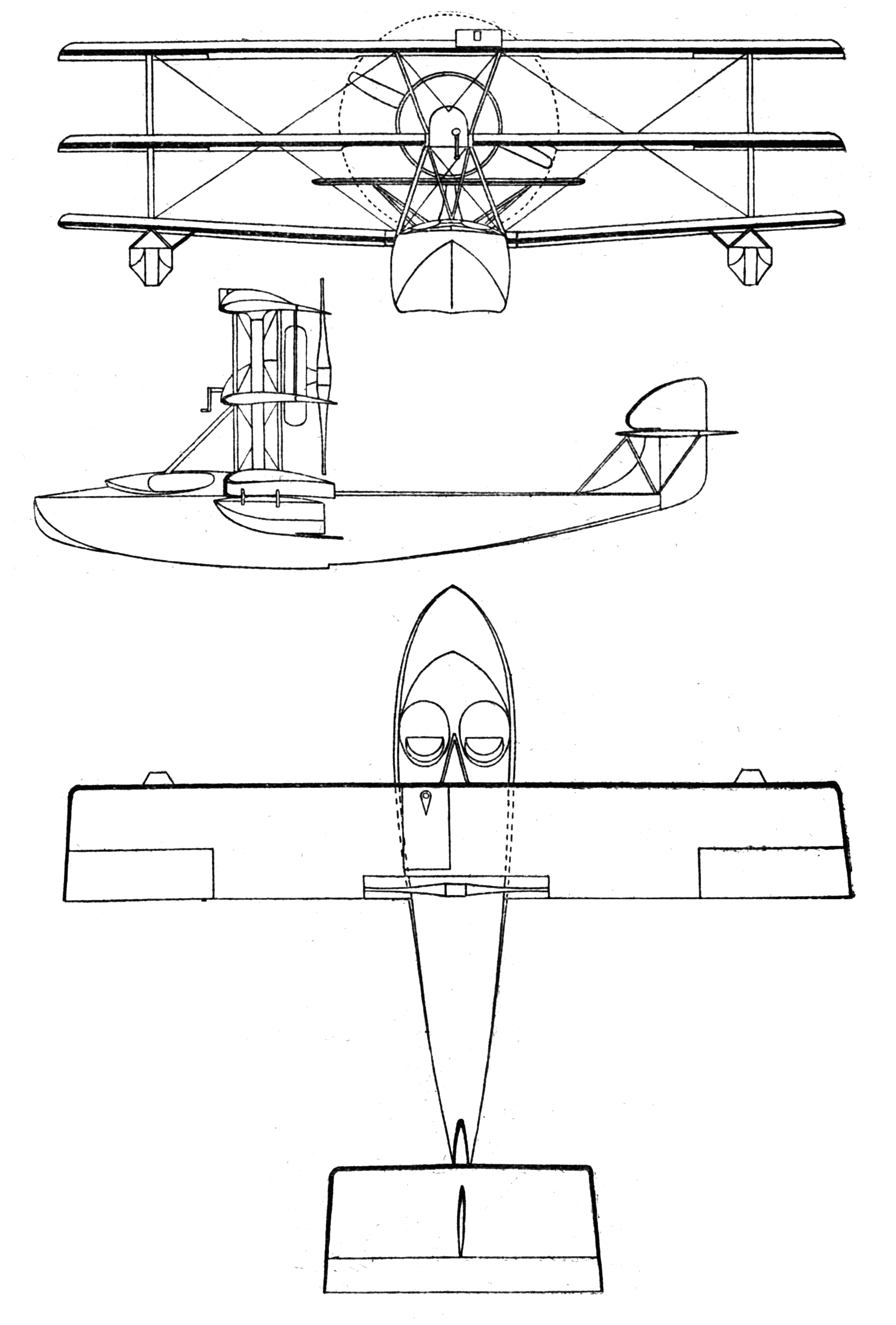
Besson H-3 3-view drawing from Les Ailes November 24, 1921

Data from

General characteristics

- Crew: 2
- Wingspan: 8.25 m (27 ft 1 in)
- Mid wingspan: 11 m (36 ft 1 in) after modification to MB-12
- Height: 3.10 m (10 ft 2 in)
- Wing area: 30.99 m^{2} (333.6 sq ft) the MB-12 had a wing area of 32.20 m^{2} (346.6 sq ft)
- Empty weight: 590 kg (1,301 lb)
- Max takeoff weight: 875 kg (1,929 lb)
- Powerplant: 1 × Clerget 9B rotary piston engine, 97 kW (130 hp)
- Propellers: 2-bladed fixed pitch wooden tractor propeller

Performance

- Maximum speed: 155 km/h (96 mph, 84 kn)
- Range: 450 km (280 mi, 240 nmi)
- Service ceiling: 3,200 m (10,500 ft)

== See also ==
Related lists

- List of flying boats and floatplanes
