= Caproni Ca.60 =

Flying boat in Italy

Ca.60
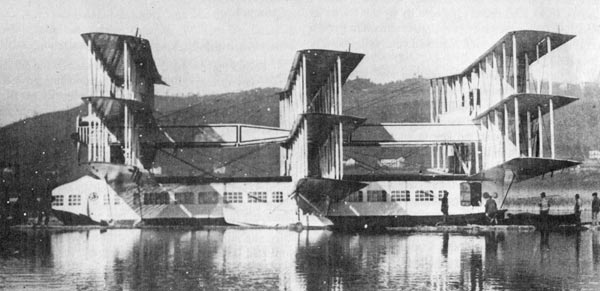
- The Caproni Ca.60 on Lake Maggiore. This picture, taken in 1921, shows the three wing sets mounted on top of the hull and the booms that connected them, as well as the panoramic cabin windows.

General information
- Type: Experimental airliner
- National origin: Italy
- Manufacturer: Caproni
- Designer: Giovanni Battista Caproni
- Status: Destroyed on second flight
- Number built: 1

History
- First flight: February 12 or March 2, 1921 (Note: Alegi & August 2006, p. 23 cites February 12, 1921 as the date of the Transaereo's maiden flight, but at p. 24 the same source considers the pause between this flight and the next inexplicable. Instead the Gianni Caproni Museum of Aeronautics, in the text of an explanatory panel, cites March 2, 1921 as the date of the maiden flight.)

The Caproni Ca.60 Transaereo, often referred to as the Noviplano (nine-wing) or Capronissimo, was the prototype of a large nine-wing flying boat intended to become a 100-passenger transatlantic airliner. (Note: The aircraft which today is most commonly cited as the "Caproni Ca.60 Transaereo" was initially called the model "3000", according to Caproni's custom, after its total power in horsepower; it was soon named "Transaereo", and it became known as "Ca.60" only retrospectively. Aviation historians consider the name "Capronissimo" to be totally unjustified from a historical point of view.) It featured eight engines and three sets of triple wings.

Only one example of this aircraft, designed by Italian aviation pioneer Gianni Caproni, was built by the Caproni company. It was tested on Lake Maggiore in 1921: its brief maiden flight took place on February 12 or March 2. Its second flight was March 4; shortly after takeoff, the aircraft crashed on the water surface and broke up upon impact. The Ca.60 was further damaged when the wreck was towed to shore and, in spite of Caproni's intention to rebuild the aircraft, the project was soon abandoned because of its excessive cost. The few surviving parts are on display at the Gianni Caproni Museum of Aeronautics and at the Volandia aviation museum in Italy.

== Development ==
Gianni Caproni became a famous aircraft designer and manufacturer during the First World War; his Caproni aviation company had major success, especially in the field of heavy multi-engine bombers, building aircraft such as the Caproni Ca.32, Ca.33, Ca.36 and Ca.40. The end of the conflict, however, caused a dramatic decrease in the demand for bombers in the Italian military. As a result, Caproni, like many other entrepreneurs of the time, directed his attention to the civil aviation market.

As early as 1913, Caproni, then aged 27, had said during an interview for the Italian sports newspaper La Gazzetta dello Sport that "aircraft with a capacity of one hundred and more passengers" would soon become a reality. It was after the war, however, that (besides converting some of his large wartime bombers into airliners) Caproni began designing a huge and ambitious passenger flying boat; he first took out a patent on a design of this kind on February 6, 1919.

The idea of a large multi-engined flying boat designed for carrying passengers on long-range flights was considered, at the time, rather eccentric. Caproni thought, however, that such an aircraft could allow faster travel to remote areas than ground or water transport, and that investing in innovative aerial means would be a less expensive strategy than improving traditional thoroughfares. He affirmed that his large flying boat could be used on any route, within a nation or internationally, and he considered operating it in countries with large territories and poor transport infrastructures, such as China. (Note: Caproni wrote: "There are countries such as China, with immense distances and very backward means of transportation and communications: such countries will turn to the means [of transportation] that offers the greatest progress.")

Caproni believed that, to attain these objectives, rearranging wartime aircraft would not be sufficient. On the contrary, he thought that a new generation of airliners (featuring extended range and increased payload capacity, the latter in turn allowing a reduction in cost per passenger) had to supersede the converted leftovers from the war. (Note: Caproni also stated that: "Taking into consideration two centers such as New York and Buenos Aires, it will be seen that, with today's communications, a letter takes about one month to go from New York to Buenos Aires, and another month for the return trip. [...] With an aircraft such as the triple-wing Caproni seaplane the New York–Buenos Aires trip could be made in 3 or 4 days! Today a telegram, again between New York and Buenos Aires, takes one day; the cost is 53 cents or a dollar per word. What would happen if, at about the same cost, it were possible, in three, four days, to deliver to Buenos Aires not a telegram of a few words but a letter, a signed document, valuables, drawing, samples?")

In spite of criticism from some important figures in Italian aviation, especially aerial warfare theorist Giulio Douhet, Caproni started designing a very innovative aircraft, which he patented in 1919.

Caproni was aware of the safety problems with passenger flights, the root of Douhet's criticism. So, he concentrated on both improving the aircraft's reliability and minimizing the damage that could be caused by possible accidents. First of all, he conceived his large seaplane as a multi-engine aircraft featuring enough motors to allow it to keep flying even in case of the failure of one or more of them. He also considered (but then discarded) "backup engines" that could be shut off once the cruise altitude had been reached and only restarted in case of emergency. The seaplane configuration assured the capability of performing relatively safe and easy emergency water landings on virtually any water surface calm and large enough. Moreover, Caproni intended to improve the comfort of the passengers by increasing the cruise altitude, which he meant to achieve with turbochargers and variable-pitch propellers (such devices could compensate for the loss of power output of the engines at high altitude).

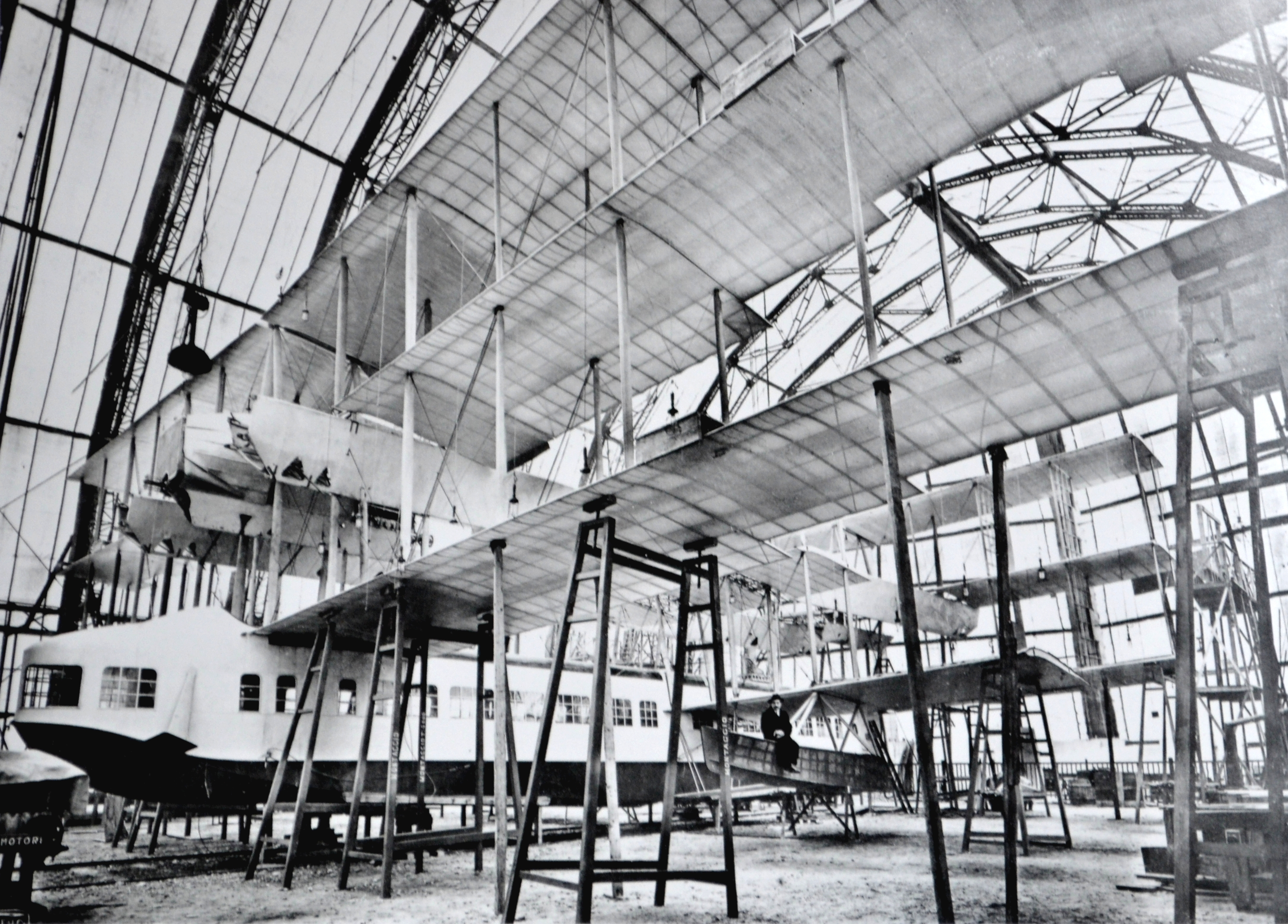
The Transaereo under construction in Sesto Calende. Gianni Caproni is sitting on the left side outrigger.

The construction of the model 3000, or Transaereo, began in the second half of 1919. The earliest reference to this event is found in a French daily newspaper of August 10, 1919, and perhaps the first parts were built in the Caproni factory of Vizzola Ticino. In September an air fair took place at the Caproni factory in Taliedo, not far from Milan, during which the new, ambitious project was heavily publicized. Later in September, Caproni experimented with a Caproni Ca.4 seaplane to improve his calculations for the Transaereo. In 1920, the huge hangar where most of the construction of the Transaereo was to take place was built in Sesto Calende, on the shore of Lake Maggiore. The several parts built by Caproni's subcontractors, many of whom had already collaborated with the company during the Great War, were assembled here.

At the end of the year, the construction yard was visited by United States Ambassador to Italy Robert Underwood Johnson, who admired Caproni's exceptional aircraft. The press affirmed that the aircraft would be able to begin test flights in January 1921, and added that, were the tests successful, Italy would swiftly gain international supremacy in the field of civil aerial transport.

On January 10, 1921, the forward engines and nacelles were tested, and no dangerous vibrations were recorded. On January 12 two of the aft engines were also successfully tested. On the fifteenth, Caproni forwarded his request for permission to undertake test flights to the Inspector General of Aeronautics, General Omodeo De Siebert.

== Design ==
The Transaereo was a large flying boat, whose main hull, which contained the cabin, hung below three sets of wings in tandem, each composed of three superimposed aerodynamic surfaces: one set was located fore of the hull, one aft and one in the center (a little lower than the other two). The wingspan of each of the nine wings was 30 m (98 ft 5 in), and the total wing area was 750.00 m^{2} (8073 ft^{2}); the fuselage was 23.45 m (77 ft) long and the whole structure, from the bottom of the hull to the top of the wings, was 9.15 m (30 ft) high. The empty weight was 14,000 kg (30,865 lb) and the maximum takeoff weight was 26,000 kg (57,320 lb).

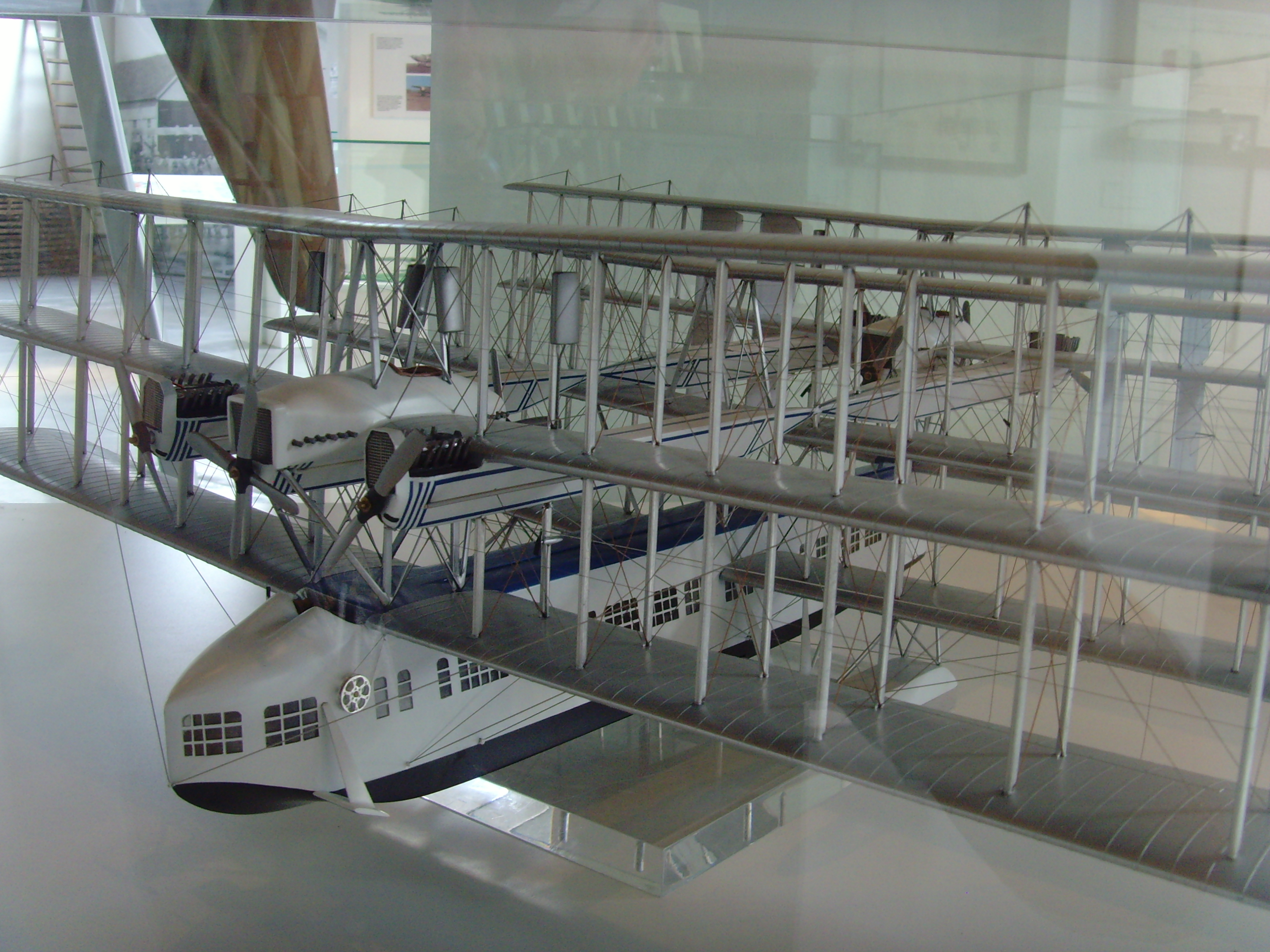
Scale model of the Transaereo, at the Volandia museum. Note the central push-pull nacelle, with pull-only nacelles on either side, and the open cockpits for pilots (on top of the main cabin) and flight engineer (in the central nacelle).

=== Lifting and control surfaces ===
Each set of three wings was obtained by the direct reuse of the lifting surfaces of the triplane bomber Caproni Ca.4; after the end of the war several aircraft of this type were cannibalized in order to build the Transaereo.

The flight control system was composed of ailerons (fitted on each single wing) and rudders, even if the aircraft didn't have a tail assembly in the traditional sense and, in particular, didn't have a horizontal stabilizer. Roll (the aircraft's rotation about the longitudinal axis) was controlled in a completely conventional way by the differential action of port and starboard ailerons; pitch (the aircraft's rotation about the transverse axis) was controlled by the differential action of fore and aft ailerons, since the aircraft didn't have elevators; four articulated vertical surfaces located between the wings of the aftmost wing set acted as vertical stabilizers and rudders controlling the yaw (the aircraft's rotation about the vertical axis). Wings had a positive dihedral angle, which contributed to stabilizing the aircraft on the roll axis; Caproni also expected the Transaereo to be very stable on the pitch axis because of the tandem-triplane configuration, for the aft wing set was supposed to act as a very big and efficient stabilizer; he said that the huge aircraft could "be flown with just one hand on the controls." Caproni had patented this particular control system on September 25, 1918.

=== Propulsion ===
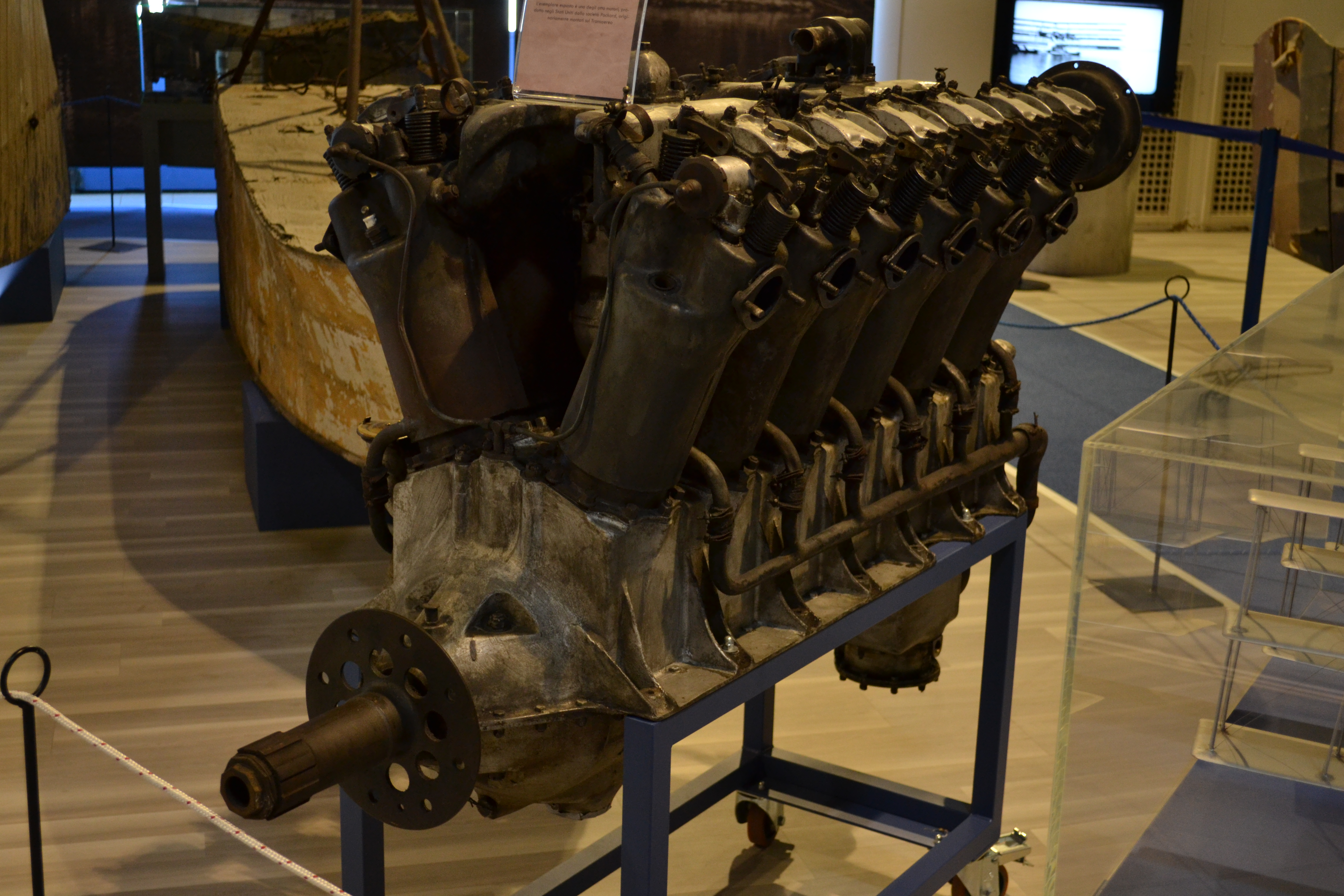
Only one of the eight Liberty L-12 engines of the Transeaereo survives, shown here on display at the Caproni Museum.

The aircraft was powered by eight Liberty L-12 V12 engines built in the United States. Capable of producing 400 hp (294 kW) each, they were the most powerful engines produced during the First World War.

They were arranged in two groups of four engines each: One group at the foremost wing set, and one at the aftmost wing set. Each group featured a central nacelle, containing two engines in a push-pull configuration, all with four-blade propellers. To either side were single-engine nacelles, with two-blade propellers. In the forward engine group, these were pulling, while in the aft engine group, they were pushing.

All nacelles had radiators for the cooling liquid. Each of the two fore side engines was connected to the central wing set and to the corresponding aft engine thanks to a truss boom with a triangular section.

The two central nacelles also housed an open-air cockpit, for one flight engineer each, who controlled the power output of the engines in response to the orders given by the pilots via means of a complex system of lights and indicators located on electrical panels.

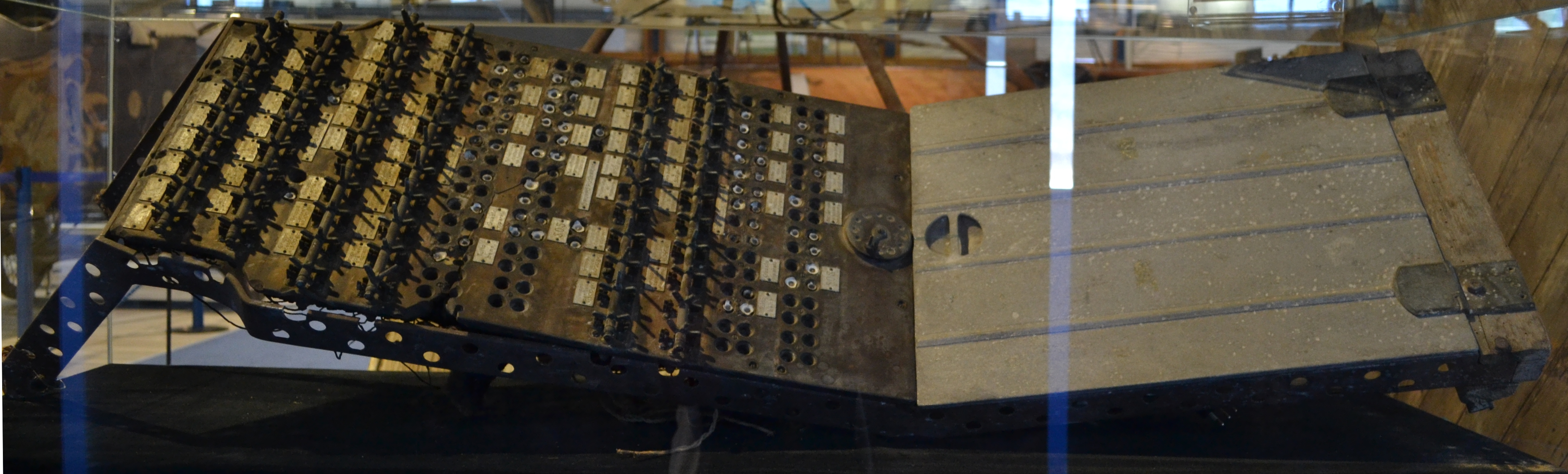
A Transaereo engine control panel, on display at the Caproni Museum. Switches and lights communicated orders from pilots to flight engineers.

The fuel tanks were located in the cabin roof, close to the central wing set. Fuel reached the engines thanks to wind-driven fuel pumps.

=== Hulls ===
The main fuselage ran the entire length of the plane, below most of the wing structure. The passenger cabin was enclosed, and featured wide panoramic windows. Travelers were meant to sit in pairs on wooden benches that faced each other—two facing forward and two backwards. It featured a lavatory at the rear end of the fuselage.

An open-air cockpit was positioned above and slightly behind the forward windows. It accommodated a pilot in command and a co-pilot side-by-side. Its floor was raised above the passenger cabin floor, so that the shoulders and heads of the pilots protruded through the roof. The flight deck could be reached from inside the fuselage by a ladder.

Besides the main hull, the aircraft was fitted with two side floats located under the central wing set, acting as outriggers which stabilized the aircraft during static floating, takeoff and landing. Caproni had Alessandro Guidoni, one of the most important seaplane designers of the time, create the hull and floats, the hydrodynamic surfaces that connected them and the two small hydrofoils located close to the nose of the aircraft: Guidoni designed new and innovative floats for the Transaereo to reduce dimensions and weight.

== Test flights ==
The Transaereo was taken out of its hangar for the first time on January 20, 1921, and on that day it was extensively photographed. On January 21, the aircraft was scheduled to be put in the water for the first time, and a cameraman had been hired to shoot some sequences of the aircraft floating on the lake. Because of the low level of the lake and of some difficulties related to the slipway that connected the hangar with the surface of the lake, the flying boat could not reach the water. After receiving De Siebert's authorization, the slipway was lengthened on January 24, and then again on 28. Operations were carried on among problems and obstacles until February 6, when Caproni was informed that 30 wing ribs had broken and needed to be repaired before the beginning of test flights. He was infuriated, and kept his employees awake through the night to allow the tests to begin on February 7. The ribs were fixed, but then a starter was found broken, further exacerbating Caproni's frustration. As a result the tests had to be postponed again.

On February 9, finally, the Transaereo was put in the water its engines running smoothly and it started taxiing on the surface of the lake. The pilot was Federico Semprini, a former military flight instructor who was known for having once looped a Caproni Ca.3 heavy bomber. He would be the test pilot in all the subsequent trials of the Transaereo; no tests were going to be performed with more than one pilot on board.

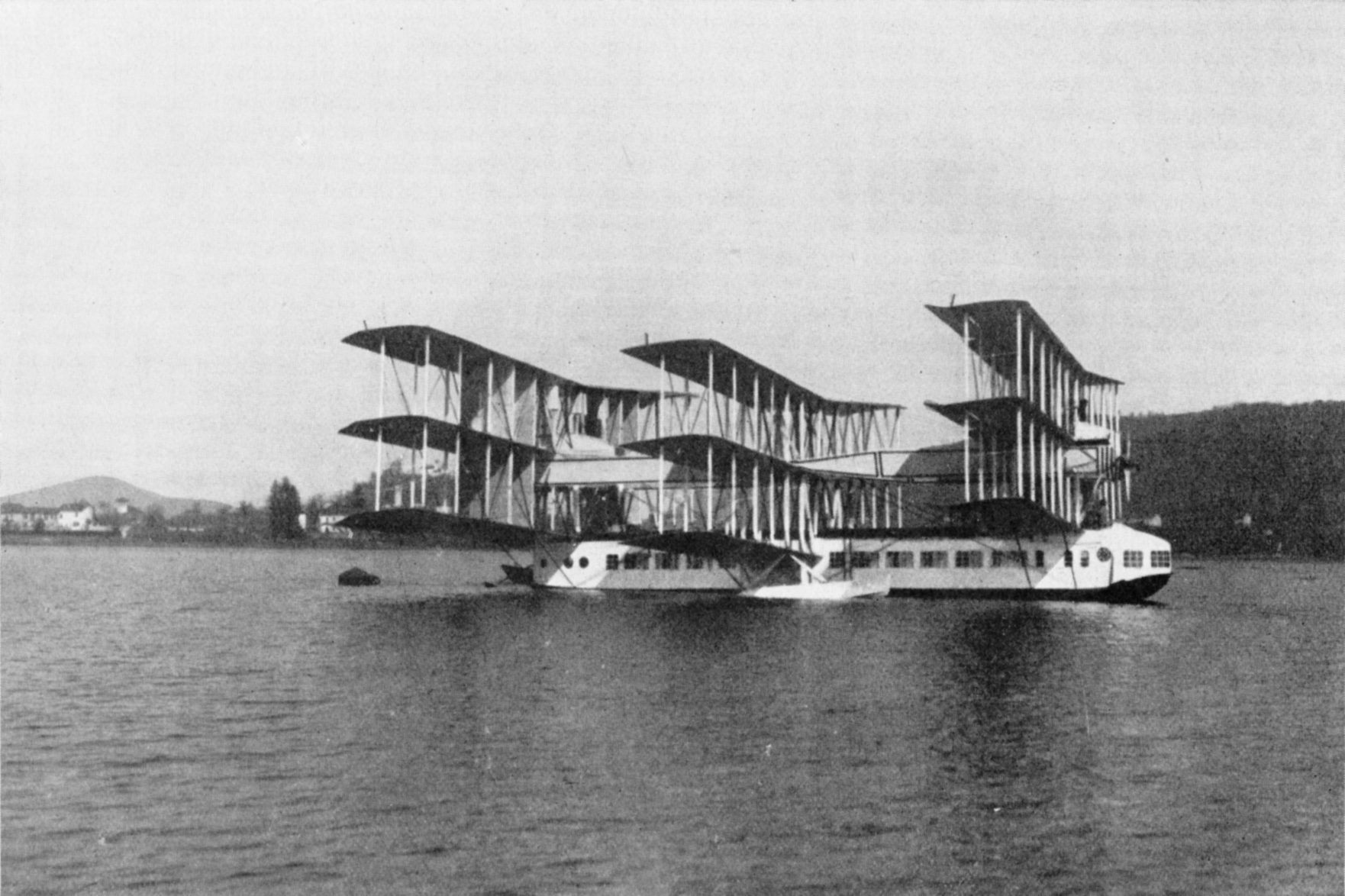
The Transaereo on Lake Maggiore.

Always keeping on the water surface, the aircraft made some turns, then accelerated simulating a takeoff run, then made other maneuvers in front of Gianni Caproni and other important representatives of the Italian aviation in the 1920s: Giulio Macchi and Alessandro Tonini of Nieuport-Macchi, Raffaele Conflenti of SIAI. The tests were soon interrupted by the worsening of the weather conditions, but their outcome was positive. The aircraft had proved responsive to the controls, maneuverable and stable; it seemed to be too light towards the bow and at the end of the day some water was found to have leaked inside the fuselage, but Caproni was satisfied.

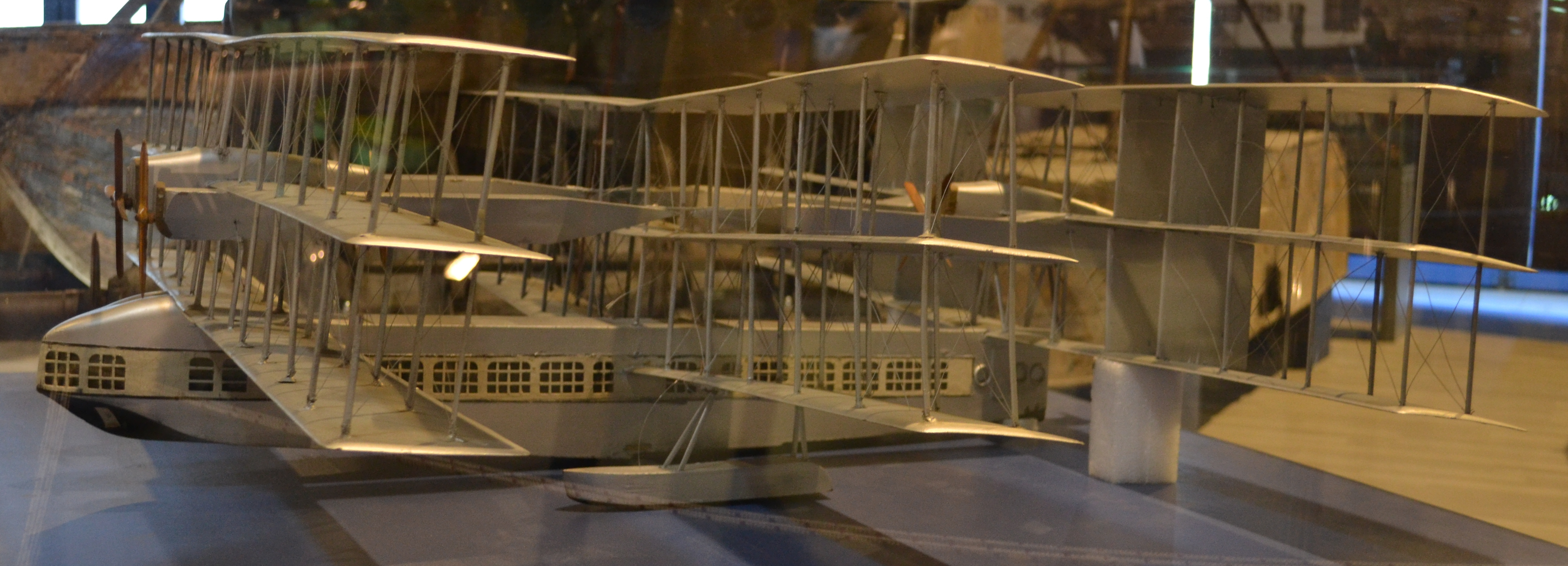
A period scale model of the Transaereo, on display at the Gianni Caproni Museum of Aeronautics. The position of the left outrigger is clearly visible, as well as the shape of the fore part of the hull.

On the next day, after reconsidering some of his calculations, Caproni decided to load the bow of the Transaereo with ballast before carrying out further tests, in order to keep the aircraft from pitching up excessively.

More taxiing tests were successfully carried out on February 11. On February 12 or March 2, 1921, the bow of the aircraft loaded with 300 kg (660 lb) of ballast, the Transaereo reached the speed of 80 km/h (43 kn; 50 mph) and took off for the first time. During the brief flight it proved stable and maneuverable, in spite of a persisting tendency to climb.

The second flight took place on March 4. Semprini (according to what he later recalled) accelerated the aircraft to 100 or 110 km/h (54–59 kn, 62–68 mph), pulling the yoke toward himself; suddenly the Transaereo took off and started climbing in a sharp nose-up attitude; the pilot reduced the throttle, but then the aircraft's tail started falling and the aircraft lost altitude, out of control. The tail soon hit the water and was rapidly followed by the nose of the aircraft, which slammed into the surface, breaking the fore part of the hull. The fore wing set collapsed in the water together with the nose of the aircraft, while the central and the aft wing sets, together with the tail of the aircraft, kept floating. The pilot and the flight engineers escaped the wreck unscathed.

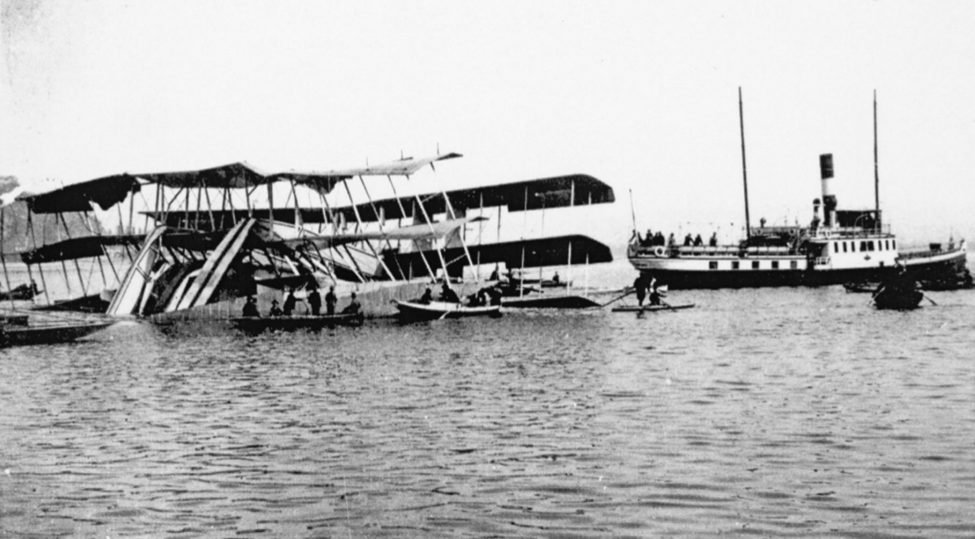
The wreck of the Transaereo is towed to shore after the accident, on March 4, 1921. The boat may be the same that interfered with the aircraft's takeoff, possibly causing it to crash.

Caproni, coming from Vizzola Ticino by automobile, was delayed, and only arrived on the shore of Lake Maggiore after the Transaereo had crashed. He later commented, "So the fruit of years of work, an aircraft that was to form the basis of future aviation, all is lost in a moment. But one must not be shocked if one wants to progress. The path of progress is strewn with suffering."

At the time, the accident was blamed on two concurrent causes. First, the wake of a steamboat that was navigating on the lake close to the area where the Transaereo was accelerating was thought to have interfered with the takeoff. Second, test pilot Semprini was blamed for having kept pulling the yoke trying to gain altitude while he should have performed corrective maneuvers, for example lowering the nose to let the huge aircraft gain speed. Another theory suggests the aforementioned boat was a ferry loaded with passengers and Semprini (who was only performing some taxiing trials, for he did not mean to take off before Caproni's arrival on the spot) was suddenly compelled to take off, in spite of the insufficient speed, to avoid a collision. According to more recent theories, the cause of the accident was probably the sandbags that had been placed in the aircraft to simulate the weight of passengers: not having been fastened to the seats, they may have slid to the back of the fuselage when, upon takeoff, the Transaereo suddenly pitched up. With the tail burdened by this additional load and a shift in the center of gravity, the aircraft became uncontrollable and the nose lifted more and more, until the Transaereo stalled and violently hit the water tail first.

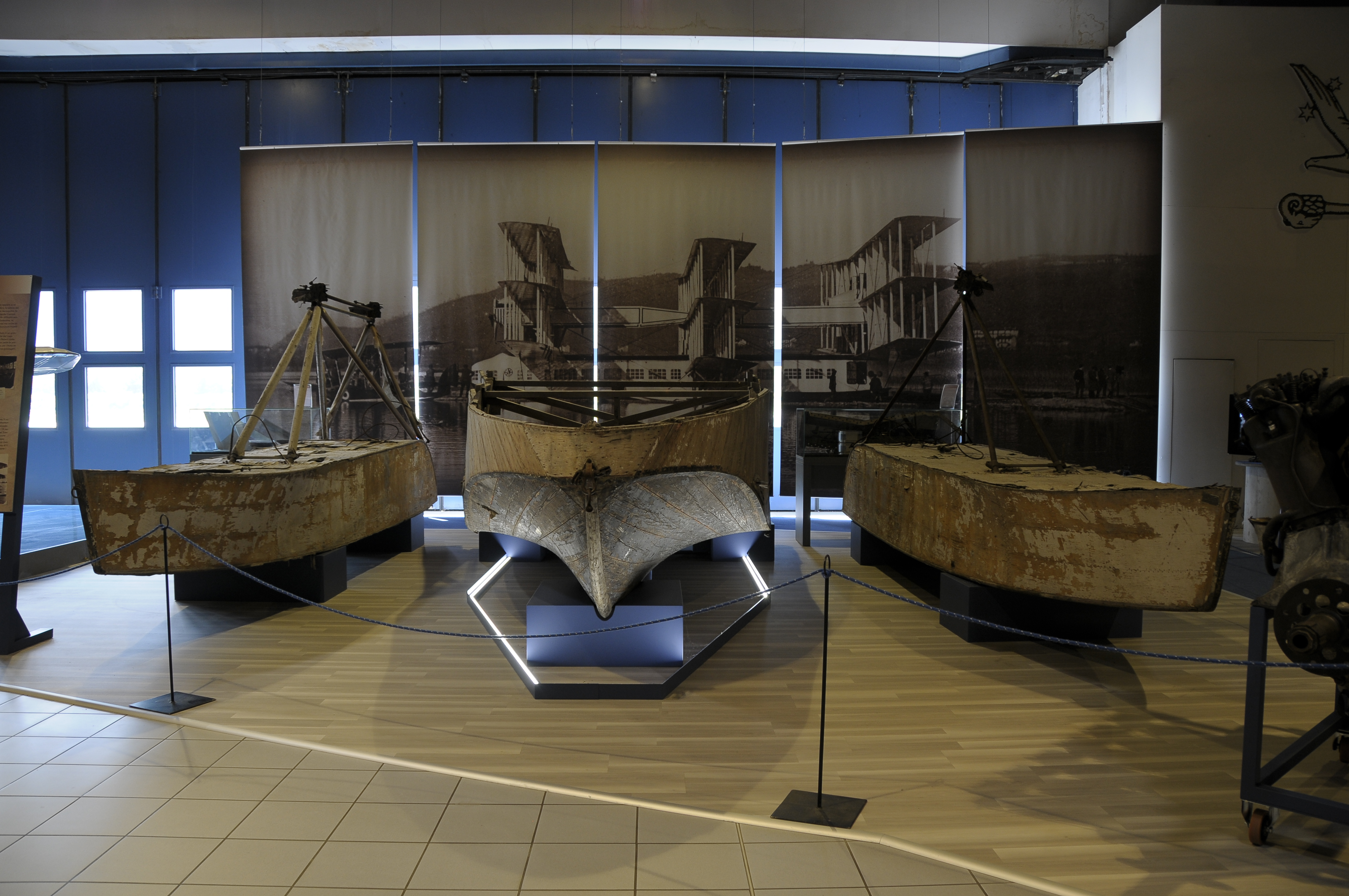
The surviving fragments of the outriggers and of the lower front section of the main hull, on display at the Gianni Caproni Museum of Aeronautics.

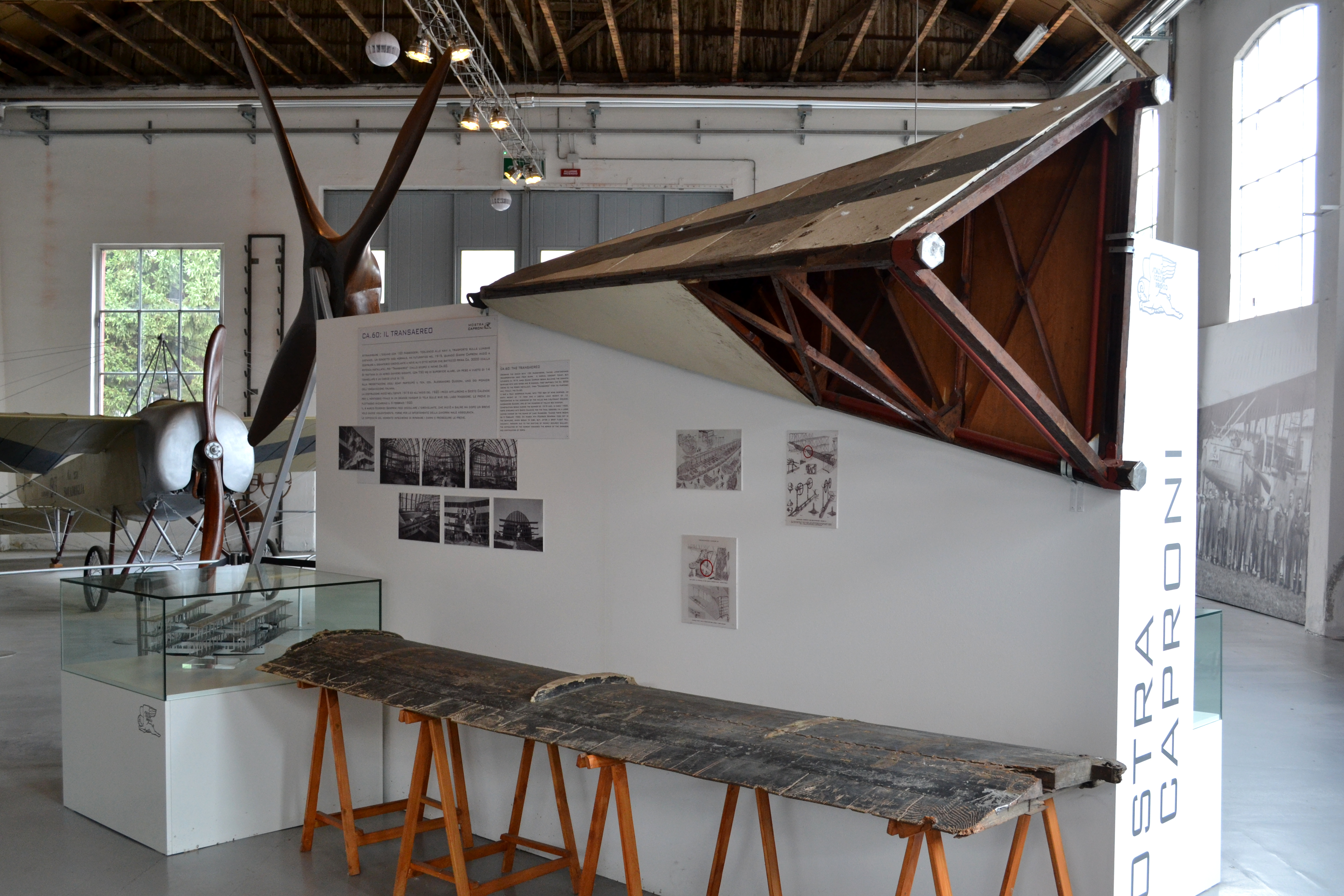
More surviving fragments (a section of one of the truss-booms and one of the hydrofoils) are on display at Volandia.

Because the photographer was on board the same car as Caproni, no photos exist of the takeoff, flight or crash, but many were shot of the wreck.

The flying boat had sustained heavy damage in the crash, but the rear two-thirds of the fuselage and the central and aft wing sets were almost intact. However, the Transaereo had to be towed to shore. The crossing of the lake, performed thanks to a boat that may have been the same that had interfered with the takeoff, further damaged the aircraft: a considerable quantity of water leaked in the hull and the fuselage was partly submerged, while the central and aft wing sets got damaged and partly collapsed in the water.

The possibility of repairing the Transaereo was remote. After the accident, only the metallic parts and the engines were still usable. Almost all wooden parts would have to be rebuilt. The cost of the repairs, according to Caproni's own estimate, would be one-third of the total cost of building the prototype, but he doubted the company's resources would be sufficient to sustain such a financial effort. After initial discouragement, however, on March 6 Caproni was already considering design modifications to carry on the project of a 100-passenger transatlantic flying boat. He was sure that the Transaereo was a promising machine, and decided to build a 1/4 scale model to keep on testing the concept.

After discussing with De Siebert and Ivanoe Bonomi (who had been the Ministry of War until shortly before), Caproni was convinced he could build a 1/3 scale model and Bonomi promised that, had he won the elections, his cabinet would grant him all the financial support he needed. However, even though Bonomi actually became Prime Minister in July, more urgent political priorities ultimately caused the project of the Transaereo to be abandoned.

Although it was not successful, the Caproni Ca.60 is considered "one of the most extraordinary aircraft ever built."

== Aircraft on display ==
Most of the damaged structure of the wreck was lost after the Transaereo project was eventually abandoned. Caproni, however, was convinced of the importance of preserving and honoring the historical heritage related to the birth and early development of Italian aviation in general, and to the Caproni firm in particular; his historical sensibility meant that several parts of the Transaereo, retrospectively known as the Caproni Ca.60, survived: the two outriggers, the lower front section of the main hull, a control and communication panel and one of the Liberty engines were spared and, after following the Caproni Museum in all its whereabouts between its foundation in 1927 and its move to its current location in Trento in 1992, they were displayed together with the rest of the permanent collection in the main exhibition hall of the museum in 2010.

A section of one of the two triangular truss-booms also survived, as well as one of the hydrofoils that connected the main hull and the outriggers. These fragments are on display at the Volandia aviation museum, in the Province of Varese, hosted in the former industrial premises of the Caproni company at Vizzola Ticino.

== Specifications (Ca.60) ==

Data from Guida agli Aeroplani di Tutto il Mondo, Aeroplani Caproni

General characteristics

- Crew: 8
- Capacity: 100 passengers
- Length: 22.6 m (74 ft 2 in)
- Wingspan: 30.5 m (100 ft 1 in)
- Height: 9.63 m (31 ft 7 in)
- Wing area: 750 m^{2} (8,100 sq ft)
- Empty weight: 14,000 kg (30,865 lb)
- Max takeoff weight: 26,000 kg (57,320 lb)
- Powerplant: 8 × Liberty L-12 V-12 water-cooled piston engines, 298 kW (400 hp) each
- Propellers: 4-bladed fixed-pitch propellers

Performance

- Cruise speed: 130 km/h (81 mph, 70 kn)
- Range: 610 km (380 mi, 330 nmi)

== In popular culture ==
The Caproni Ca.60 was featured in the 2013 semi-fictional movie The Wind Rises by Japanese director Hayao Miyazaki, as was Caproni himself.

== See also ==
- Gianni Caproni Museum of Aeronautics
- List of experimental aircraft
- List of flying boats and floatplanes

== Bibliography ==
- Abate, Rosario; Alegi, Gregory; Apostolo, Giorgio (1992). Aeroplani Caproni – Gianni Caproni ideatore e costruttore di ali italiane (in Italian). Museo Caproni. pp. 100–102.
- Alegi, Gregory (August 2006). "The castle door, the mooring pylon and the Transaereo – Part 1". WW1 Aero – the Journal of the Early Aeroplane (193). ISSN 0736-198X.
- —— (November 2006). "The castle door, the mooring pylon and the Transaereo – Part 2". WW1 Aero – the Journal of the Early Aeroplane (194). ISSN 0736-198X.
- Caproni, Gianni (1937). Gli Aeroplani Caproni – Studi, progetti, realizzazioni dal 1908 al 1935 (in Italian). Milano: Museo Caproni. pp. 135–144.
- Federigo Federighi. "Un jumbo stile liberty". Aviazione e Marina (in Italian): 70–72.
- Grant, R.G. (2003). Niccoli, R. (ed.). Il volo – 100 anni di aviazione (in Italian). Novara: DeAgostini. ISBN 88-418-0951-5.
- "The Caproni 'Nineplandem' Flying Boat". Flight. XIII (17): 289–291. 28 April 1921.
