= Caudron Type D =

French 1911 aircraft

Type D

General information
- Type: Single seat biplane
- National origin: France
- Manufacturer: Caudron
- Number built: at least 13

History
- First flight: December 1911
- Developed from: Caudron Type C

The Caudron Type D was a French pre-World War I single seat, twin-boom tractor biplane, a close but slightly smaller relative of the two seat Caudron Type C. More than a dozen were completed, one exported to the United Kingdom, where they may also have been licence-built, and three to China.

== Design and development ==
In late 1911, W.H. Ewen acquired the right to supply Caudron aircraft in the United Kingdom and in Ewen Aviation's 1913 catalogue the single seat Type D appears on the page labelled Type C; though the latter was a two-seater, the two types appear to have been closely related. Both were twin boom, tractor biplanes, which began with equal upper and lower spans but were later modified into sesquiplanes. Both were single-seaters, with engine and pilot in an inter-wing nacelle. In contrast to the Type C, the Type D was a little smaller and lighter and in its early months was powered by the low power (26 kW (35 hp)) 3-cylinder Anzani radial engine. After modification to a sesquiplane, the upper to lower span ratio of the Type D was smaller than that of the Type C.

The Type D was a two-bay biplane with an inner bay only about half the width of the outer. Both two-spar fabric-covered wings had rectangular plans apart from angled tips. There was no stagger, so the two sets of parallel interplane struts were parallel and vertical. The upper wing overhang produced by the sesquiplane modification was supported by extra parallel pairs of outward leaning interplane struts. Wire bracing completed the structure. The rear spar was ahead of mid-chord, leaving the ribs in the rear part of the wing flexible and allowing roll control by wing warping.

The nacelle was a simple, short, flat-sided structure. It was supported above the lower wing on two more pairs of interplane struts which passed within the nacelle. The Anzani engine was mounted uncowled at the front, with the pilot seated under the trailing edge.

The empennage of the Type D was supported on a pair of girders arranged parallel to one another in plan. The upper girder members were attached to the upper wing spars at the tops of the innermost interplane struts and the lower ones ran under the lower wing, mounted on downward extensions of the inner interplane struts. The mounting was strengthened with two diagonal struts on each side, one from the base of the forward interplane strut to the upcurved tip of the lower member and the other from the rear interplane strut to the junction of the lower member and its first vertical cross member. Each of these lower members, which supported the aircraft on the ground as skids, carried twin, rubber sprung landing wheels. Behind the wing the upper and lower members converged to the rear; the drag on the lower members reduced the landing run. There were three vertical cross braces on each girder but the only lateral inter-girder cross-members were near the tail, though there was wire bracing. The broad chord tailplane was mounted a little below the upper girder member with a pair of round-cornered rectangular rudders above it.

== Operational history ==
The Type D first appeared in December 1911 and in total thirteen were built. Of these, one was sold in England and three others to China, all sesquiplanes; the Chinese aircraft had the more powerful 34 kW (45 hp) 6-cylinder Anzani radial engine. This engine was again mounted uncowled, showing its characteristic ring exhaust. One aircraft, originally the Type Abis, was modified into a Type D, retaining its 37 kW (50 hp) Gnome Omega 7-cylinder rotary engine with an oil-deflecting cowling over the upper half, extending back over the front fuselage.

A Type D powered by a larger displacement 6-cylinder Anzani, producing 45 kW (60 hp), was delivered from Paris on 21 June 1912 by Guillaux to Mr Ramsay in London. It had a longer nacelle which seated two, had curved, raised decking immediately ahead of the cockpit and was suspended between the innermost interplane struts, like the Type B rather than the Type C. Caudron referred to this version as the Type D2. With tanks for 125 L (27 imp gal; 33 US gal) it had an endurance of three hours. A second Type D2 was constructed for Philippe Marty.

It is not known how many aircraft were constructed in the United Kingdom by Ewen Aviation or its successor, British Caudron, nor the particular types built, though one was powered by a 22–26 kW (30–35 hp) Anzani and used at Ewen's flying school. It was mostly flown by beginners on short, straight hops.

== Specifications ==
Performance figures are for the 37 kW (50 hp) Gnome rotary-engined variant.

Data from Hauet (2001) p.28

General characteristics

- Crew: one
- Length: 6.7 m (22 ft 0 in)
- Upper wingspan: 9.7 m (31 ft 10 in)
- Lower wingspan: 7.3 m (23 ft 11 in)
- Wing area: 24 m^{2} (260 sq ft)
- Empty weight: 220 kg (485 lb)
- Gross weight: 350 kg (772 lb)
- Powerplant: 1 × Anzani 3-cylinder radial, 26 kW (35 hp) , 30 or 34 kW (40 or 45 hp) Anzani or 37 kW (50 hp) Gnome rotary
- Propellers: 2-bladed

Performance

- Maximum speed: 90 km/h (56 mph, 49 kn)
- Time to altitude: 10 min to 500 m (1,600 ft)
