= Dynamit Nobel =

German chemical and weapons company

- Type: limited company
- Industry: Manufacture of explosives chemical industry
- Predecessor: RWS
- Founded: 21 June 1865; 161 years ago
- Founder: Alfred Nobel
- Headquarters: Troisdorf, Germany
- Key people: Jürg Oleas (last president)
- Products: Chemical products and defense equipment
- Revenue: 2.3 billion euros (2003)
- Number of employees: 13,000 (2003)
- Parent: Metallgesellschaft
- Website: www.dynamit-nobel.de

Dynamit Nobel AG is a German chemical and weapons company whose headquarters is in Troisdorf, Germany. It was founded in 1865 by Alfred Nobel.

== Creation ==
After the death of his younger brother Emil in an 1864 nitroglycerin explosion at the family's armaments factory in Heleneborg, Stockholm, Nobel founded Nitroglycerin AB in Vinterviken, Stockholm. A year later, having found some German business partners, he launched the Alfred Nobel & Company in Germany, building an isolated factory in the Krümmel hills of Geesthacht near Hamburg. This business exported a liquid combination of nitroglycerin and gunpowder known as "Blasting Oil", but it was extremely unstable and difficult to transport, as shown in numerous catastrophes. The buildings of the Krümmel factory itself were destroyed in 1866, and again in 1870.

In April 1866, the company shipped three unmarked crates of nitroglycerin to California for the Central Pacific Railroad, who wished to experiment with its blasting capability to speed the construction of a tunnel through the Sierra Nevada for the First transcontinental railroad. One of the crates exploded, destroying a Wells Fargo office in San Francisco and killing fifteen people, leading to a complete ban on the transport of liquid nitroglycerin in California.

Liquid nitroglycerin was widely banned elsewhere as well, and this finally led to Alfred Nobel & Company's development of dynamite in 1867, made by mixing the nitroglycerin with the diatomaceous earth (kieselguhr) found in the Krümmel hills. Competitors tried to mix nitroglycerin with other inert absorbents in many different combinations to get around Nobel's tightly controlled patents.

== History ==
=== History of component companies and mergers ===
- 1865 Alfred Nobel & Co founded in Krümmel near Hamburg.
- 1866 United States Blasting Oil Company founded in the United States
- 1867 Nobel receives patent for dynamite
- 1871 British Dynamite Company founded in Ardeer, Scotland
- 1876 Nobel receives patents for gelignite
- 1876 Société Générale pour la Fabrication de la Dynamite founded in Paris, France
- 1876 Alfred Nobel & Co changes its name to Dynamitaktiengesellschaft (DAG)
- 1877 British Dynamite Company changes its name to Nobel's Explosives Company
- 1880 Dynamite Nobel formed by merging Italian and Swiss companies
- 1886 Nobel-Dynamite Trust Co formed by merging DAG and the Nobel's Explosives Company in the UK

=== From 1865 to 1918 ===
Dynamit Nobel AG originates from the company Alfred Nobel & Co., founded on 21 June 1865 in Hamburg by the Swedish chemist and industrialist Alfred Nobel. At the beginning, the company was manufacturing nitroglycerin explosives in the dynamite factory of Krümmel located in Geesthacht, near Hamburg. This factory was the first one to be located outside of Sweden.

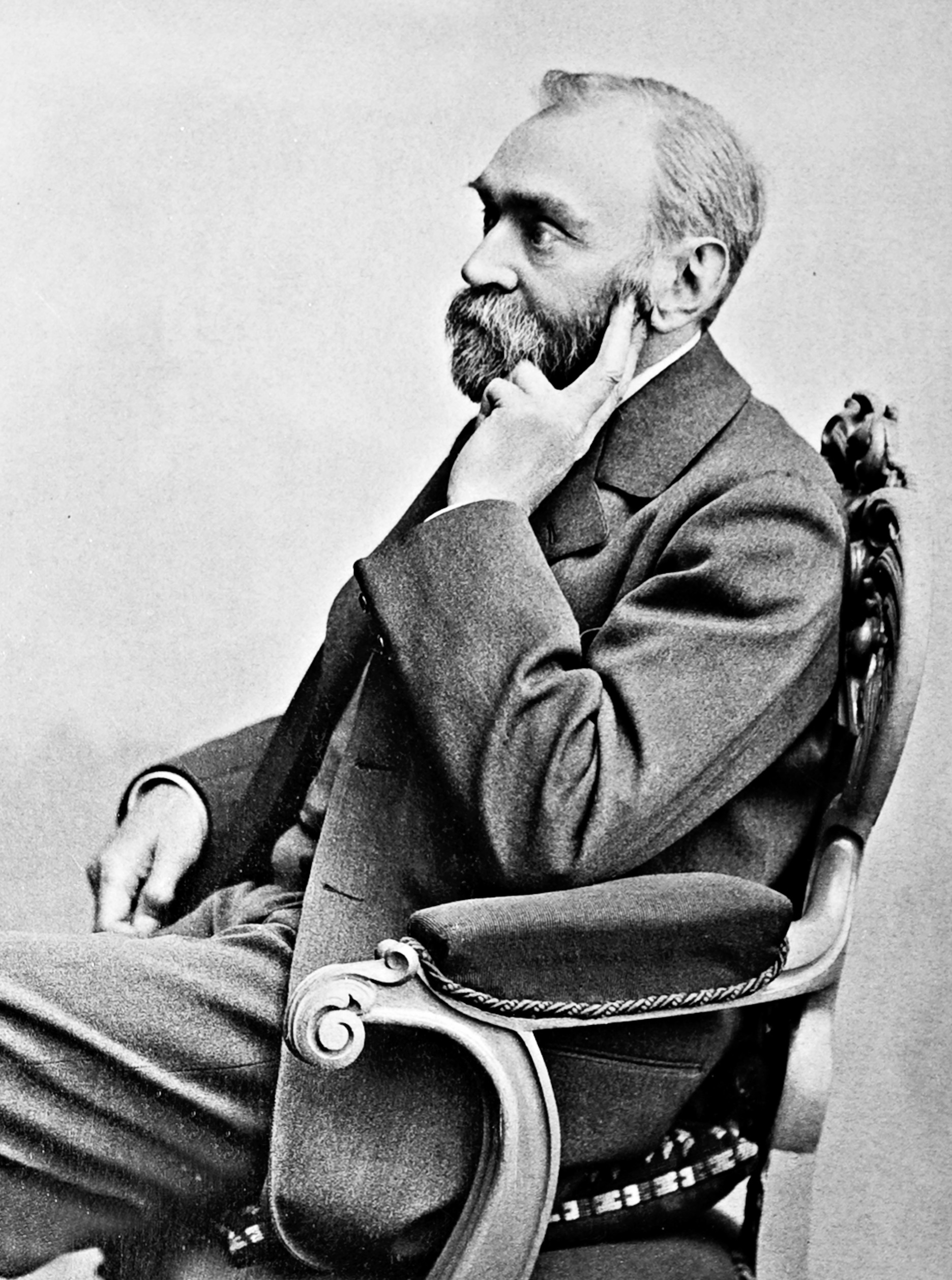
Alfred Nobel

Nobel wanted to produce nitroglycerine on several sites in Europe because the transportation of explosives was very dangerous due to its well-known sensitivity to shocks.

Because of the danger associated with handling nitroglycerine, Nobel started to develop a more secure explosive commonly known as dynamite. During the experimental stage, a very severe explosion occurred in 1866 within the Krümmel factory which was nearly destroyed. He was successful in mixing nitroglycerine with Kieselgur which made it less sensitive to shocks. In October 1867, Nobel filed a patent for this new explosive in Sweden, the United States of America and in the United Kingdom (the patent was not filed in Germany before 1877). The new explosive was marketed under the name of security powder. In 1874, in order to ensure a better supply of the main buyers, the mines of the region of Ruhr, the company took over the Schlebusch factory in Manfort (since 1930, a district of Leverkusen; Nobel was involved in its construction since 1872, and supervised the production on a temporary basis. In 1876, Nobel's company became a limited liability company and was renamed Dynamit AG, i.e. DAG). The company started manufacturing defense equipment, and soon afterwards became the biggest manufacturer of powder and ammunitions of the German Reich.

In 1884, similar to other European countries, the biggest German powder manufacturers agreed to form a cartel known as named Deutsche Union (or "Interessensgemeinschaft") which was led by Dynamit Nobel for five years. All the largest manufacturers of powder of the German Reich abided by this union which prevented them from competing against each other due to their cooperation and agreement upon the export prices. In 1886, they approached the English powder cartel, the Nobel Dynamite Trust Co and managed to establish the General cartel made up of both the German and English powder factories.

Due to the high demand for defense equipments for the First World War, the manufacturers of powder made very high profits, which were reinforced due to their cartel organization. Furthermore, during this period, the states strongly encouraged the development and production of weapons. In 1886, Dynamit Nobel opened a branch in Troisdorf and as from 1905, this factory also manufactured a plastic material based on nitrocellulose (an explosive product): known as celluloid.

Until the start of the First World War, Dynamit Nobel grew by acquiring smaller competitor companies to become the biggest explosive manufacturer in Europe. During the war, it employed prisoners of war in its factory (namely Russian prisoners in the factory of Dömitz).

Without descendants, Alfred Nobel, decided that after his death his fortune would be used to create the Nobel foundation. This was done in 1900. Each year this foundation awards the Nobel Prize. The fortune of Nobel was converted into shares that finance the Nobel foundation.

=== From 1918 to 1945 ===
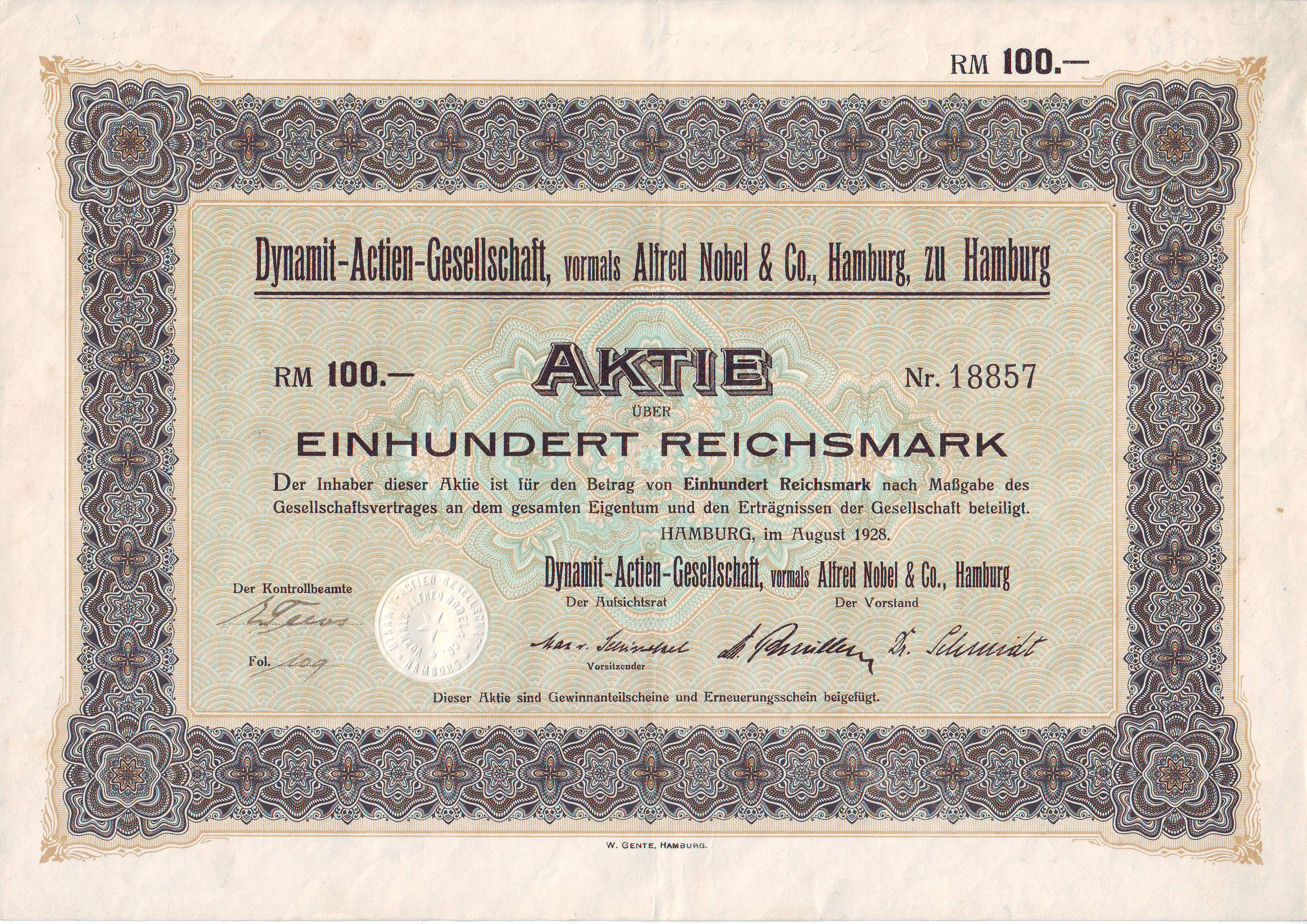
Share of the Dynamit AG, vorm. Alfred Nobel & Co., issue August 1928

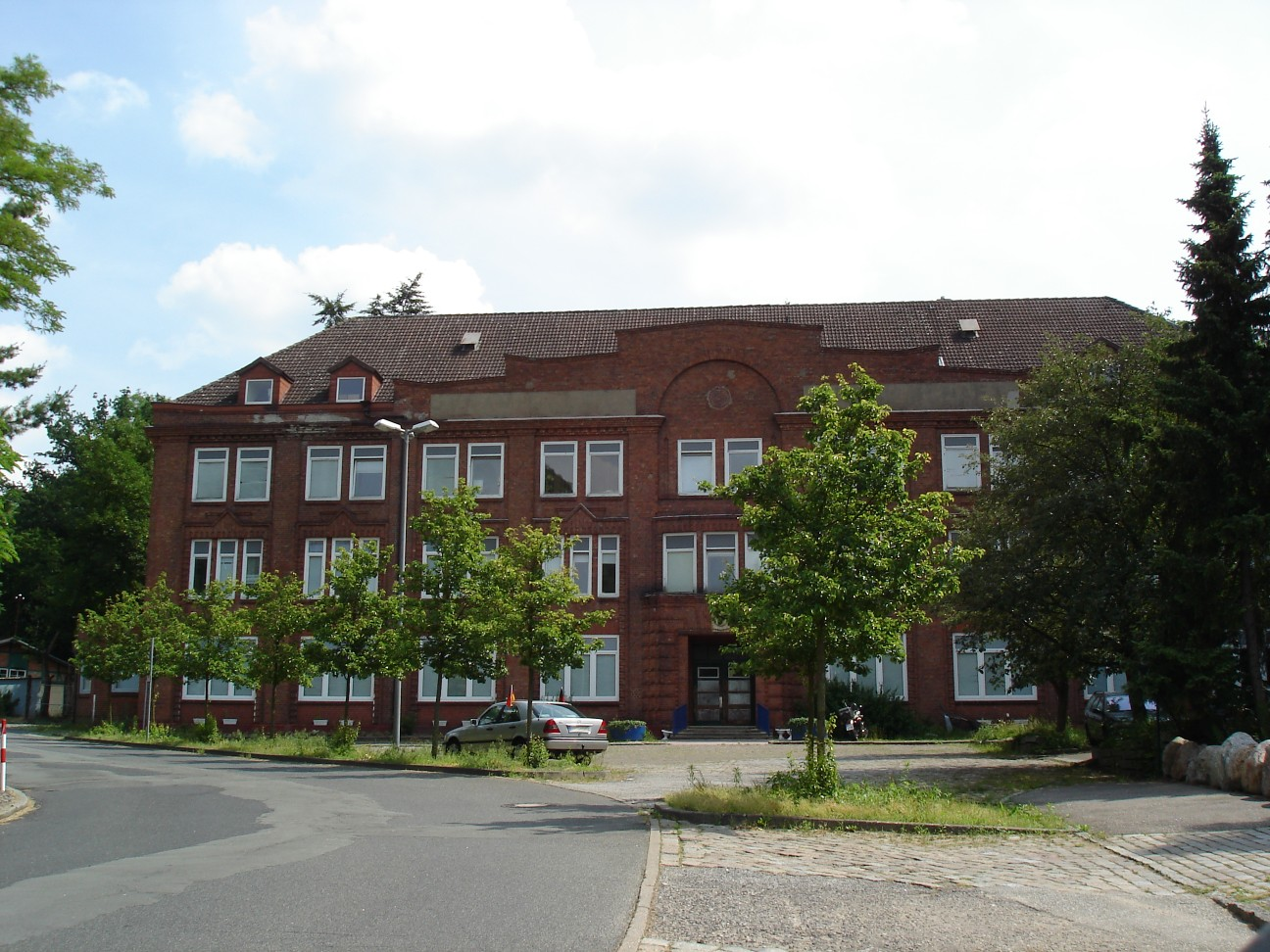
The old administrative building of the Krümmel explosive factory.

After the end of the war, parts of the factory's facilities were dismantled and after the enforcement of the Versailles treaty, companies were forbidden to manufacture defense equipment. As from then, the company manufactured mostly explosives destined to mines, detonators, ignition systems as well as ammunitions for hunting and sports. The end of the production of the highly profitable defense equipment caused the company to suffer from heavy financial losses. This caused the company to close down some factories while reducing the production capacities in others. In 1923, the company launched the manufacture of plastic parts made of nitrocellulose. Indeed, Dynamit Nobel aimed at reducing its dependence to the defense equipment in order to give more importance to the manufacture of chemical products.

In 1925, the Lindener Zündhütchen- und Thoonwaarenfabrik of Empelde was taken over by the Chemische Werke Lothringen GmbH, which itself belonged to BASF. Production was stopped in 1928, and did not restart until the rearmament which occurred in 1938. During the 1920s, the company collaborated closely with the Siegener Dynamitfabrik AG and the Rheinisch-Westfälische Sprengstoff A.G. which belonged to I.G. Farben since 1931.

In 1926, as a result of the fusion with Köln-Rottweil AG which belonged to I.G. Farben, Dynamit Nobel was taken over by I.G. Farben. As from then, it formed a cartel with Westfalit AG (the forerunner of the WASAG, which was also taken over by I.G. Farben in 1945), which had a monopolistic position on the German powder market. In 1930, the Rheinische Spritzguß-Werk GmbH (today the Dynamit Nobel Kunststoff GmbH) was founded in Cologne. After the national-socialists took lead of the German government, and wished to develop a strong German defense industry, the Wehrmacht explicitly requested bigger ammunition manufacturing capacities. In order to do so, the WASAG and Dynamit Nobel founded the Deutsche Sprengchemie GmbH in 1934. New factories manufacturing explosives and ammunitions were built on government lands and received help from a company which had been nationalized, the Verwertungsgesellschaft für Mountain-Industrie mbH.

Afterwards, the Deutsche Sprengchemie GmbH became the only subsidiary of WASAG. Dynamit Nobel had the same activities in Gesellschaft zur Verwertung chemischer Erzeugnisse mbH (i.e. Verwertchemie). The latter ran more than 30 factories, namely in Liebenau, Empelde, and Stadtallendorf. At that time, Stadtallendorf was the largest place of ammunition production in Europe. During World War Two, more than 100,000 people coming from camps managed by the SS were forced to work there. In 1938, a new factory manufacturing nitrocellulose was built in Aschau am Inn. After the war it became the property of WASAG due to the decartelization of I.G. Farben.

=== From 1945 to 1992 ===
After World War Two, Dynamit Nobel began manufacturing plastic equipment and ammunition in West Germany but was not able to keep the factories located in the areas occupied by the Soviets. These factories were partly dismembered. From 1953, Dynamit Nobel tried to develop intermediary organic products in order not to rely completely on the plastic equipment. After deciding the rearmament of Bundeswehr, the manufacture of ammunition was restarted in 1957, at first in the factory of Liebenau by the Gesellschaft zur Verwertung chemischer Erzeugnisse mbH which had survived the war. At the beginning of the 1960s, once again, the company became the leader of the military and civil powder market in Germany, namely due to the takeover of the manufacturer of ammunitions Gustav Genschow & Co. AG de Karlsruhe in 1963. At the same time, Dynamit Nobel took an increasing position in the mines market. Since 1958, around 3 million antitank mines, models DM-11 were manufactured in Liebenau under license of the Swedish company LIAB. Moreover, in collaboration with Bölkow and Dornier, Dynamit Nobel participated to the research projects of the Ministry of nuclear energy (today known as the Federal Ministry of education and research) for the possible supply of Germany with missiles. During the end of the 1950s, Friedrich Flick, who was a board member of the supervisory board before the war, started to monopolize the company to the detriment of the minority shareholders, sometimes by brutal means. Supported by the Bremen speculator Hermann Krages and partly due to the collusive trading of actions with the Feldmühle AG of which Flick was also a shareholder, he managed to obtain the majority of the shares of the company and became the president of the board of directors. As from then, Flick who already possessed 82% of the share capital, made use of the controversial Umwandlungssteuergesetzes (fiscal law regarding commercial companies) in order to squeeze out the minority shareholders of the company, in exchange of a compensation (this tool is comparable to the one used today in order to exclude minority shareholders out of a company). After several groups of shareholders protested against this law put into place under the third Reich, the Federal Constitutional Tribunal gave a judgement in favor of Flick.

In 1959, Dynamit AG changed its name to Dynamit Nobel AG, in remembrance of its famous founder. As from 1962, due to the pressure which occurred during the conference, the company which belonged to Flick started to negotiate the compensation to be given to 1,300 forced Jewish employees who worked in the factory of Troisdorf in 1944 and 1945. After an agreement was made, Friedrich Flick personally blocked the payment of five million Deutsche Mark and no sum of money was released until his death in 1972. In January 1970, Flick made a final statement and declared that he

was not able to admit neither moral nor humanitarian reasons warranting any payment

— Friedrich Flick,

He affirmed that a payment would contradict his previous statements of innocence at the Flick trial and he was unwilling to make a payment to be considered as an admission of guilt. He also affirmed that the Swiss Dieter Bührle (Oerlikon-Bührle) was also a shareholder of Dynamit Nobel, being the owner of 18% of the shares.

After Bundeswehr was fully equipped with antitank mines during the late 1960s, the factory of Liebenau was sold in 1977 to the Dutch ammunitions manufacturer Eurometaal, owned by Dynamit Nobel (33% of shares). As from then, the big mines projects were put into place in Troisdorf and in Burbach-Würgendorf.

In 1986, the Flick group was bought by Deutsche Bank for an approximate amount of 5.36 billions of DM. The latter restructured the group and sold parts of it while putting the rest of the group on the stock market. Deutsche Bank finally agreed to compensate the forced workers of Dynamit Nobel AG in respect of the conditions established in the 1960s. During the restructuring of Dynamit Nobel AG, a joint-venture was made with two of the companies of the Flick Group, namely Feldmühle AG and Buderus AG and was renamed Feldmühle Nobel AG. In 1986, the new group was introduced on the stock market. In 1988, the grandchildren of Friedrich Flick (Friedrich Christian Flick and his brother Gert Rudolf Flick) failed to gain control over the Feldmühle Nobel AG. Indeed, in 1992, Metallgesellschaft AG (today known as the GEA Group) took over the company to fraction it again. Shares of Dynamit Nobel AG and Buderus remained the property of Metallgesellschaft, while the pulp and paper division (formerly known as Feldmühle AG) was sold under the name of Feldmühle Nobel AG to the Swedish company Stora (Stora Enso since 1998). As early as 1988, Gesellschaft zur Verwertung chemischer Erzeugnisse mbH, which had been managed as an affiliate, and Dynamit Nobel put into force an agreement regarding the consolidation and profit transfer in 1990, the subsidiary was merged with another subsidiary, Dynamit Nobel Explosivstoff- und Systemtechnik GmbH.

=== Since 1992 ===
At the beginning of the 1990s, the company was present in the basic and intermediary chemical products, synthetic fibers, specific chemical products (such as silicon wafers) and the processing of plastic materials (in particular PVC). About one quarter of the turnover of the company originated from the traditional sector of explosives, as well as the ammunition technology which is closely linked to the equipment projects of the Bundeswehr. In 1992, the company took over Cerasiv GmbH and Chemetall GmbH, and in 1994 Sachtleben Chemie GmbH and Chemson GmbH were also taken over. In 1996, the company acquired CeramTec AG which belonged to Hoechst and merged with Cerasiv GmbH under the name of CeramTec Innovative Ceramic Engineering AG. In 1997, Dynamit Nobel took over Phoenix Kunststoff GmbH in order to reinforce its position in the plastic equipments market. In 1999, Dynamit Nobel and the chemical company Solvadis were united within the MG chemical group. The scope of chemical activities within Chemetall was optimized by the acquisition of Cyprus Foote (1998) and Brent (1999), followed by the sale of two subsidiaries namely, Chemson GmbH (1999) and Coventya GmbH (2000). In 2001, the industrial activities of Dynamit Nobel Explosivstoff und Systemtechnik GmbH was taken over by Orica. In 2002, the Swiss group RUAG technology took over Dynamit Nobel Ammotec GmbH, which had been separated from Dynamit Nobel Explosivstoff und Systemtechnik GmbH. In this company, the production was focused on the manufacture of ammunitions of small calibre. In 2004, MG technologies AG sold its chemical activities to emphasize the manufacture of equipment. Therefore, Dynamit Nobel AG was dismantled and taken over by several companies. The American company Rockwood Specialties Group Inc, the largest buyer, acquired Sachtleben Chemie GmbH, Chemetall GmbH, CeramTec Innovative Ceramic Engineering AG and DNSC GmbH as of 31 July 2004 for 2.25 billions of euros through its Luxemburg subsidiary Knight Lux 1 S.A.R.L.. Part of DNSC GmbH remains in Leverkusen and is known as Dynamit Nobel GmbH ES. Rockwood is a chemical holding company that the financial investor company Kohlberg Kravis Roberts & Co had acquired. Dynamit Nobel Kunststoff GmbH was taken over in 2004 by the Swedish company Plastal Holding AB for 915 million euros.

The technical armament activity was reduced under the name of Dynamit Nobel Defence GmbH, with the registered office located in Würgendorf (Burbach). The company was specialized in the manufacture of small calibers for the army, official authorities, hunters and shooting sports and was taken over by the Swiss group RUAG in 2002 and merged with its ammunitions branch. Therefore, the former companies Dynamit Nobel Marken RWS, Rottweil and Geco were named RUAG Ammotec GmbH (Fürth). The dismantlement of the Nobel group was made in close collaboration with the employees representatives, who were highly involved during the sales negotiations. Indisputably the employees' committee would have preferred that the chemical activity remains within MG technologies AG, but an agreement was reached as Rockwood Inc. certified that the long term interests of the company would be maintained and that all the German employees would keep their jobs.

== Defence projects since the Second World War ==
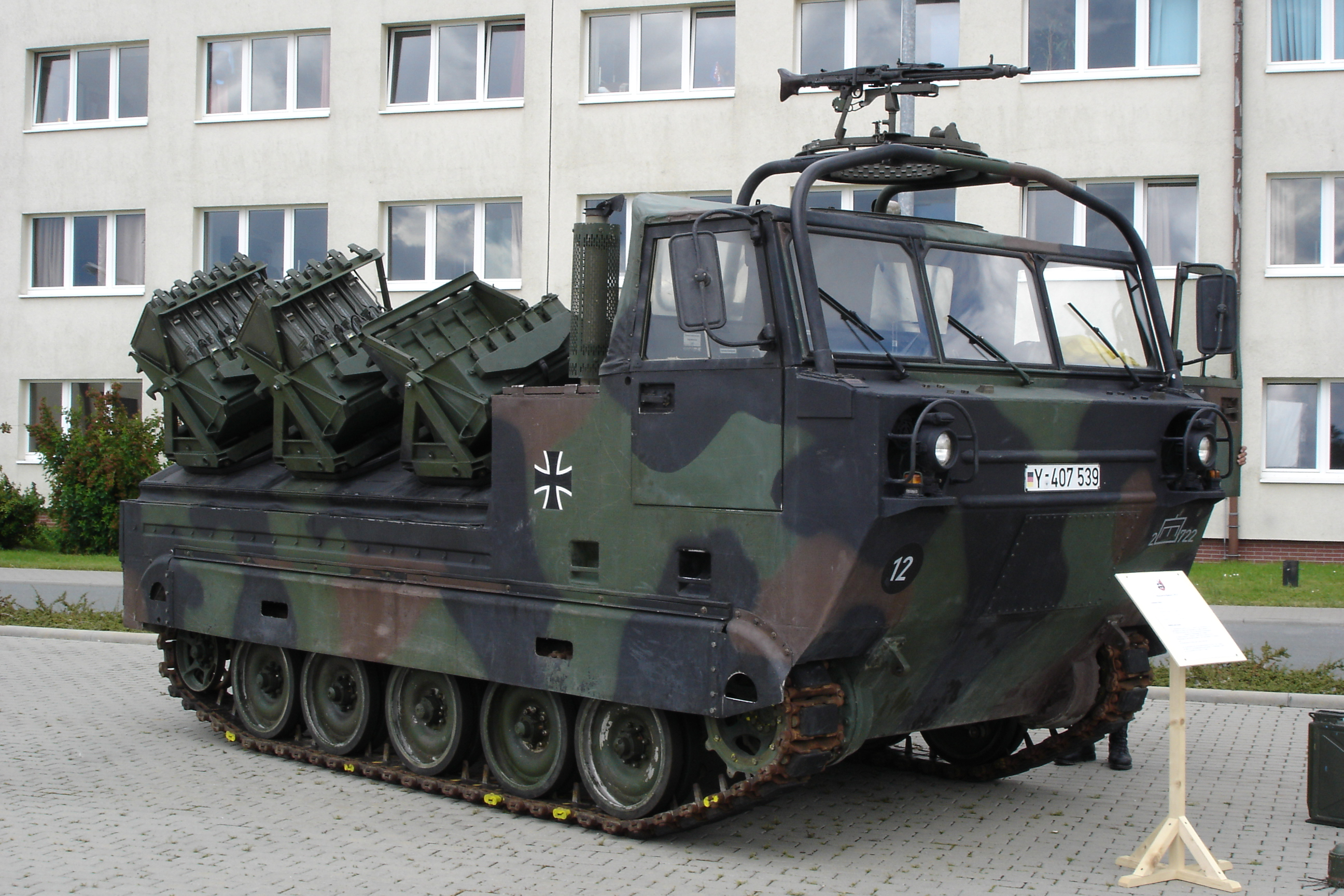
The Minenwurfsystem Skorpion.

As from 1958, Gesellschaft zur Verwertung chemischer Erzeugnisse mbH/Verwertchemie, a subsidiary of Dynamit Nobel manufactured antitank mines of type DM-11 in Liebenau, under license of the Swedish company LIAB. The AT-2 antitank mines were created by Dynamit Nobel and approximately 1.3 millions were manufactured. The Bundeswehr ordered 300,000 of them for the LARS (a system of light artillery with missiles) which was into place until 2000, about 300,000 were manufactured for Minenwurfsystem Skorpion (a vehicle which installed mines) and 300,000 for M270 (a multiple rocket launcher). Between 1981 and 1986, the Bundeswehr invested 564.7 millions of DM in mines projects. Besides the AT-2 antitank mines, Dynamit Nobel developed an antipersonnel mine AP-2, an anti-material mine, a signal mine and a shallow water mine. HK G11, a new assault rifle using an ammunition without casing was developed in collaboration with the weapons manufacturer Heckler & Koch between 1968 and 1990, whereas Dynamit Nobel developed the ammunitions without casing. The project was completed but the Bundeswehr declined it due to financial considerations.

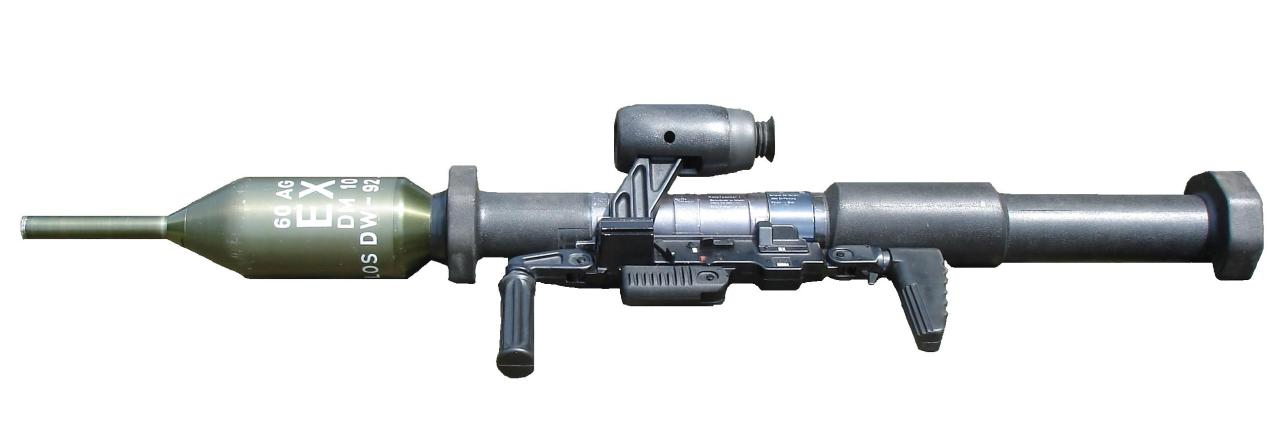
Ammunition project 2010: rocket launcher Panzerfaust 3.

Dynamit Nobel marketed the Swedish antitank mine FFV 028SN of the company FFV and took charge of the transformation of 125 000 antipersonnel mines, model DM-31 which had been manufactured between 1962 and 1967 by Industriewerke Karlsruhe (today KUKA) which belonged to the Quandt group at the time, in order to enable them to conform to the antitank mines authorized by the Ottawa Treaty. However, the detonator was not sufficiently modified, and it could therefore be used against people, while it should only have been used against tanks. In respect of an agreement made in 1989, Dynamit Nobel was manufacturing blank cartridge bullets and figure targets in Würgendorf. Dynamit Nobel also agreed to develop the Panzerfaust 3, in order to progressively deliver it to the Bundeswehr and other armies as the priority antitank defense mechanism in the infantry. In 2010, several different types are manufactured for the Bundeswehr.

== Vinyl chloride poisoning in Troisdorf ==
Until the 1970s, Dynamit Nobel polymerised the monomer vinyl chloride into polyvinyl chloride (PVC) in the factory of Troisdorf. At this time, about 130 to 140 employees were regularly in touch with it. In total, about 3600 persons have worked within this division since the launching of the production in Troisdorf in the 1940s.

Infringing the health and safety regulations in force at that time, the employees of Dynamit Nobel were exposed for years, with little protection, to this harmful substance which later turned out to be carcinogenic. Therefore, they were heavily contaminated by vinyl chloride gas or by cleaning up the autoclaves. At this time, most of the other manufacturers of PVC had already put into place systems of production, which were less dangerous for the health. The same had not been done at Dynamit Nobel because of financial considerations. Moreover, regular controls were not made, others were partially manipulated or the results were kept secret. Also, the company made an important contribution to the region, regularly obtained extensions of time to apply the regulations. Contamination due to vinyl chloride was so severe that for years in the company, the employees complained of damage relating to the liver, anemia, finger circulation disorder resulting in acro-osteolysis (necrosis of the first phalanxes), as well as headaches and dizziness. Cancers also resulted from the exposure.

After the announcement of the first thirteen severe diseases during spring 1972, work inspectors from Bonn ordered Dynamit Nobel to take the appropriate measures in order to improve the health and safety conditions of work. But the company took a long time to put them into place.

Afterwards, the 40 sick employees gathered together as Interessengemeinschaft der VC-Geschädigten in order to file a complaint for violation of duty against the Land of North-Rhine-Westphalia and asked for damage compensation, just like in the Contergan trial. The local committee of the DKP in Troisdorf filed a complaint for injury and involuntary homicides against the board of directors of Dynamit Nobel AG. Both complaints remained unsuccessful. After more details about the scandal were made public, employees and inhabitants of Troisdorf organized a series of demonstrations. In 1975, the company's board of directors decided to shut down PVC polymerisation workshop to escape the expensive costs related to modernization and security of the plant.
