= Caudron Type B =

Type B

General information
- Type: Two seat biplane
- National origin: France
- Manufacturer: Caudron
- Status: retired
- Number built: 2

History
- First flight: 28 January 1911
- Developed from: Caudron Type A

The Caudron Type B was a 1911 development of the earliest Caudron type, the Caudron Type A, with a nacelle style fuselage and more powerful engine. Initially an equal span biplane, it was modified into a sesquiplane.

== Design and development ==
Pilots of the earliest Caudron aircraft, the Caudron Type A, sat unprotected on the wing. One Type A placed the tractor engine and pilot within a short, unskinned nacelle frame, mounted above the lower wing and the Type Abis introduced a similar but enclosed nacelle with an open cockpit. This became the standard arrangement on Caudron's twin-boom biplanes from the Type B to the Caudron Type F and, with minor modification, through to the widely used World War I Caudron G.3.

In its original form, the Type B was an equal span, wire braced two bay biplane, though the inner bay was only about half the width of the outer. The two spar fabric covered wings had the same rectangular plan apart from angled tips. There was no stagger, so the three sets of parallel interplane struts were parallel and vertical; the innermost pair defined the centre section and supported the nacelle with the assistance of further cabane struts. The rear spar was ahead of mid-chord, leaving the ribs in the rear part of the wing flexible and allowing roll control by wing warping. A second Type B, the B2 which appeared in August 1911 with similar wings, was six months later modified into a sesquiplane with an upper wing span of 11.6 m (38 ft 1 in), a lower span of 7.30 m (23 ft 11 in) and a total wing area of 32 m^{2} (344 sq ft). The upper overhang was supported by parallel, outward leaning struts from the bases of the outer interplane struts. Many later Caudron designs were similarly braced sesquiplanes.

The nacelle was a simple, flat sided structure with the 37 kW (50 hp) Gnome Omega rotary engine in the front. A 37 kW (50 hp) Anzani 6-cylinder radial engine may also have been fitted. There was a transversely mounted, cylindrical fuel tank behind the engine, its upper half visible at the front of the open cockpit. Initially the Caudron catalogue described the type B as a three-seater, then as a two-seater, with the pilot always in the extreme rear of the nacelle. Photographs show the B in its earliest form with two aboard, then later, after another tank had been fitted in the gap between the nacelle and lower wing, with three.

The empennage of the type B was supported on a pair of girders arranged parallel to one another in plan. The upper girder members were attached to the upper wing spars at the tops of the innermost interplane struts and the lower ones ran under the lower wing, mounted on interplane strut extensions. These lower members, which supported the aircraft on the ground as skids, each carried twin landing wheels and curved upwards ahead of them, strengthened by diagonal struts back to the forward interplane strut under the wing. Behind the wing the upper and lower members converged to the rear. There were three vertical cross braces on each girder but the only lateral inter-girder struts were near the tail, though there was wire bracing. The broad chord, roughly rectangular, warping tailplane was mounted a little below the upper girder member. Above it, a pair of rectangular rudders were separated by one third of the tailplane span.

The Type B first flew on 28 January 1911. The European Circuit competition which started in June 1911 involved flights between towns in France, Belgium, the Netherlands and England. Duval took part with the Caudron Type Abis but had to abandon it towards the end of the fifth stage, near Brussels. He collected the Type B from the Caudron factory at Rue on 4 July and flew it via Calais to Brighton and Dover, destinations on the English part of the circuit.

In 1912 the B2 was bought by Auguste Maïcon who announced that on 16 February he would begin a flight to Porto Maurizio and thence to Nice. Details of his journey are not known but on 18 August he flew from Allasio, some 21 km (13 mi) from Porto Maurizio, to Nice, a flight of 150 km (93 mi).

Another but unrelated Type B appeared in Caudron's 1912 catalogue, the Type B Multiplace. It was a large three-bay biplane with wings of unequal span and, uniquely for Caudrons of the period 1910–1915, a conventional enclosed, full length fuselage. As the name asserts, it was intended to carry several passengers.

== Variants ==
Type B
Originally equal span wing, later modified to sesquiplane. 1 built.
Type B2
Similar to B, with similar later wing modifications. 1 built.

== Specifications (Type B, equal span wings) ==
Data from Hauet (2001) p.21

General characteristics

- Crew: one pilot
- Capacity: one or two passengers
- Length: 9.0 m (29 ft 6 in)
- Wingspan: 10.0 m (32 ft 10 in)
- Wing area: 40 m^{2} (430 sq ft)
- Empty weight: 310 kg (683 lb)
- Powerplant: 1 × Gnome Omega 7-cylinder rotary engine, 37 kW (50 hp) or an Anzani 6-cylinder 45 kW (60 hp) radial engine
- Propellers: 2-bladed Normale
- Maximum speed: 100 km/h (62 mph, 54 kn)
- Cruise speed: 88 km/h (55 mph, 48 kn)
- Range: 170 km (110 mi, 92 nmi)
