= Réquillard 1910 monoplane =

1910s French aircraft

Réquillard 1910

General information
- Type: Experimental aircraft
- National origin: France
- Designer: Requillard
- Number built: 1

History
- Introduction date: 1910

The Réquillard 1910 monoplane was a French experimental monoplane aircraft built in the early 1910s.

== Specifications ==
Data from

General characteristics

- Crew: 1
- Length: 7.00 m (23 ft 0 in)
- Wingspan: 10.00 m (32 ft 10 in)
- Wing area: 20.00 m^{2} (215.3 sq ft)
- Gross weight: 400 kg (882 lb)
- Powerplant: 1 × Gnome 7 Omega 7-cylinder air-cooled rotary piston engine, 37 kW (50 hp)
- Propellers: 2-bladed fixed-pitch propeller

Performance
