= Farman HF.10 =

1910s French reconnaissance aircraft

HF.10

General information
- Type: Reconnaissance aircraft
- Manufacturer: Farman
- Designer: Henri Farman
- Number built: 2

History
- First flight: 1912

The Farman HF.10 was a reconnaissance aircraft built in France shortly before the First World War.

== Development ==
The HF.10 was developed in 1911 for the military aircraft competition (Concours Militaire), held in Reims. The HF.10 had a Gnome Rhone engine, but the subsequent HF.10bis had a slightly more powerful Gnome Gamma engine with a power of 70 hp.

== Specifications ==
Data from

General characteristics

- Crew: 3
- Length: 10.20 m (33 ft 6 in)
- Wingspan: 16.00 m (52 ft 6 in)
- Height: 2.70 m (8 ft 10 in)
- Wing area: 72 m^{2} (780 sq ft)
- Empty weight: 350 kg (772 lb)
- Max takeoff weight: 550 kg (1,213 lb)
- Powerplant: 1 × Gnome Omega 7-cylinder air-cooled rotary piston engine, 37 kW (50 hp)
- Propellers: 2-bladed fixed-pitch wooden pusher propeller

Performance

- Maximum speed: 80 km/h (50 mph, 43 kn)
- Range: 315 km (196 mi, 170 nmi)

== Bibliography ==
- Liron, Jean (1984). Les avions Farman. Collection Docavia. Vol. 21. Paris: Éditions Larivière. OCLC 37146471.
