= City of Paris =

The City of Paris may refer to:

- Paris, capital of France
- La Ville de Paris, a 1910-12 painting by Robert Delaunay
- La Ville de Paris, a dirigible constructed in 1906

== Passenger liners ==
- SS City of Paris (1865)
- SS City of Paris (1888)
- SS City of Paris (1920)

== Other uses ==
- City of Paris Dry Goods Co., a former store in San Francisco (1850-1976)
- City of Paris (Los Angeles), a department store
- Ville de Paris (department store), Los Angeles

== See also ==
- Paris (disambiguation)
