= Maurice Mallet =

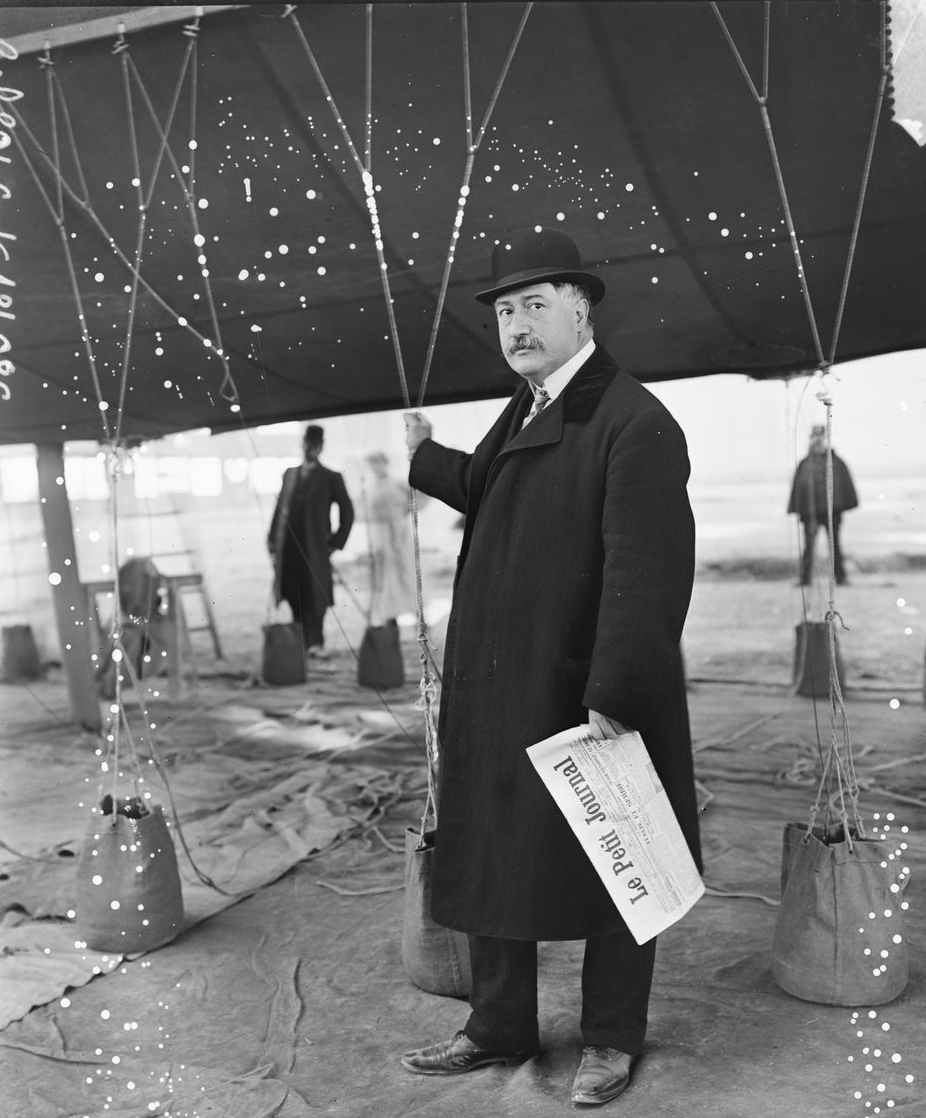
Maurice Mallet by an airship.

Maurice Mallet (1861–1926) was a cofounder of the company later called Zodiac Aerospace.

In 1896, Mallet joined with Henry de La Vaulx and other associates to launch the company Mallet, Mélandri et de Pitray. The company made gas balloons for sport and tourism. In 1899, it was renamed Ateliers de Constructions Aéronautiques Maurice Mallet. The Mallet workshops prospered thanks to regular orders from the Aéro-Club de France, the French flying club.

In 1902–3, Mallet collaborated with Victor Tatin to construct the dirigible La Ville de Paris for Henri Deutsch de la Meurthe. It was not successful and Deutsch de la Meurthe sponsored a later more successful one with the same name.

Mallet held patents for inventions related to dirigibles.

Around 1908, the company became Société française des ballons dirigeables (i.e. French airship company) then in 1911 the company changed its name to become Zodiac. In 1909, the name Zodiac (with an English spelling) appeared in the name Société française de ballons dirigeables et d'aviation Zodiac (i.e. Zodiac French airship and aviation company), followed in 1911 by Société Zodiac, anciens Établissements aéronautiques Maurice Mallet (i.e. Zodiac Company, formerly Maurice Mallet aeronautical establishments).

It then experienced a boom in the construction of airplanes and airships, especially for the Aérostation Maritime (Naval Balloon Command) and through its participation in World War I.

He is buried in Courbevoie, cimetière des Fauvelles (1st division, transverse alley, grave nr 10).

== Pictures ==
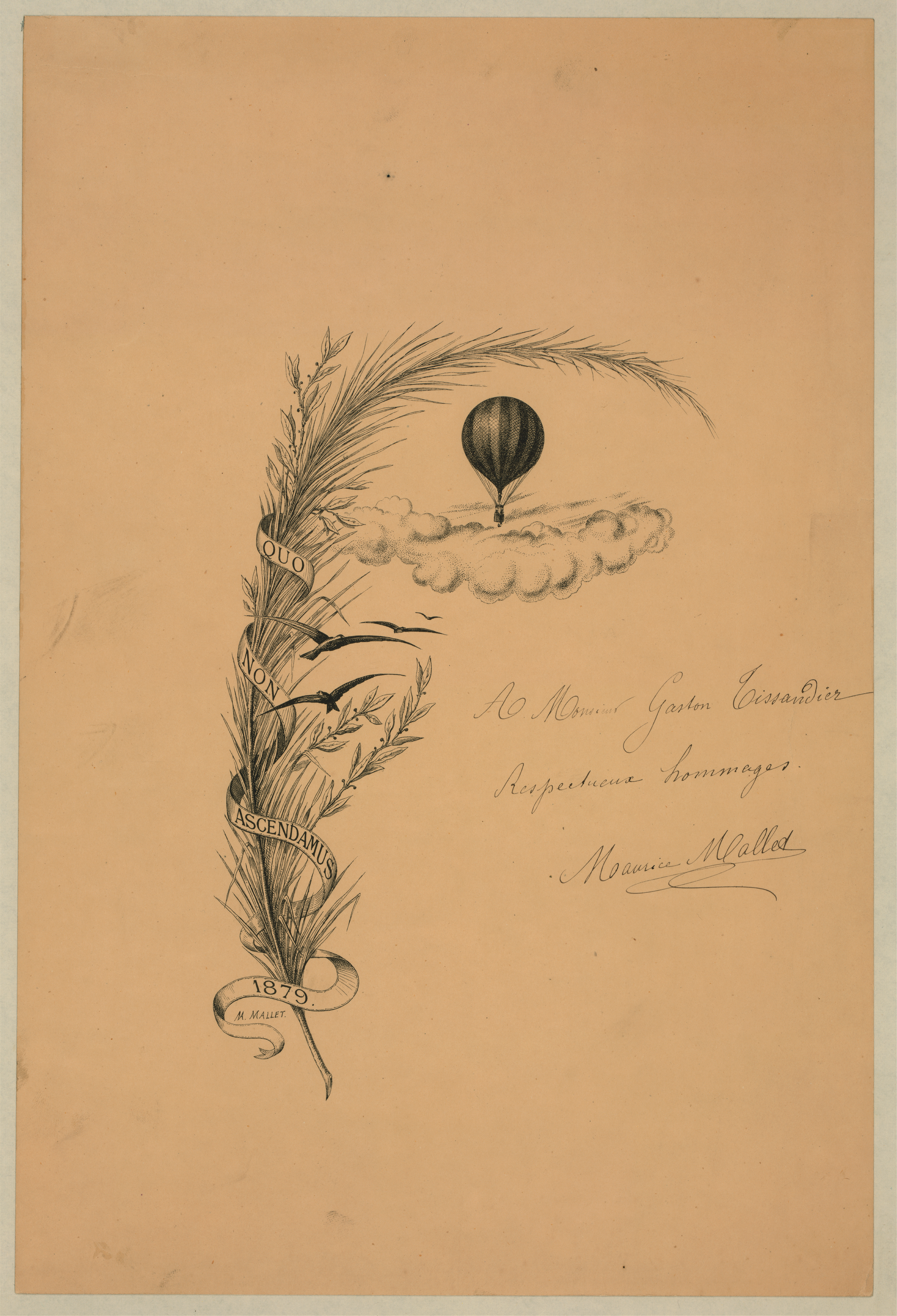
Drawing by Maurice Mallet (1879).

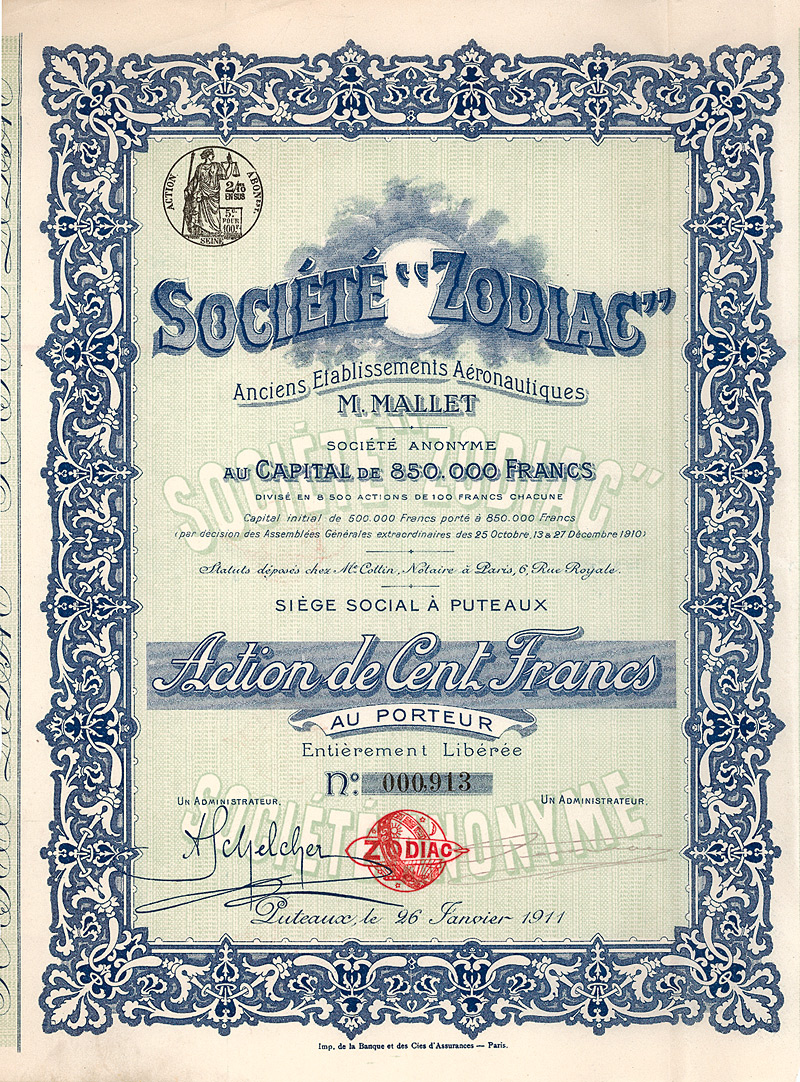
Share of the Société Zodiac from
the 26. January 1911.

Image by Maurice Mallet on cover of L'Aérophile (1898).

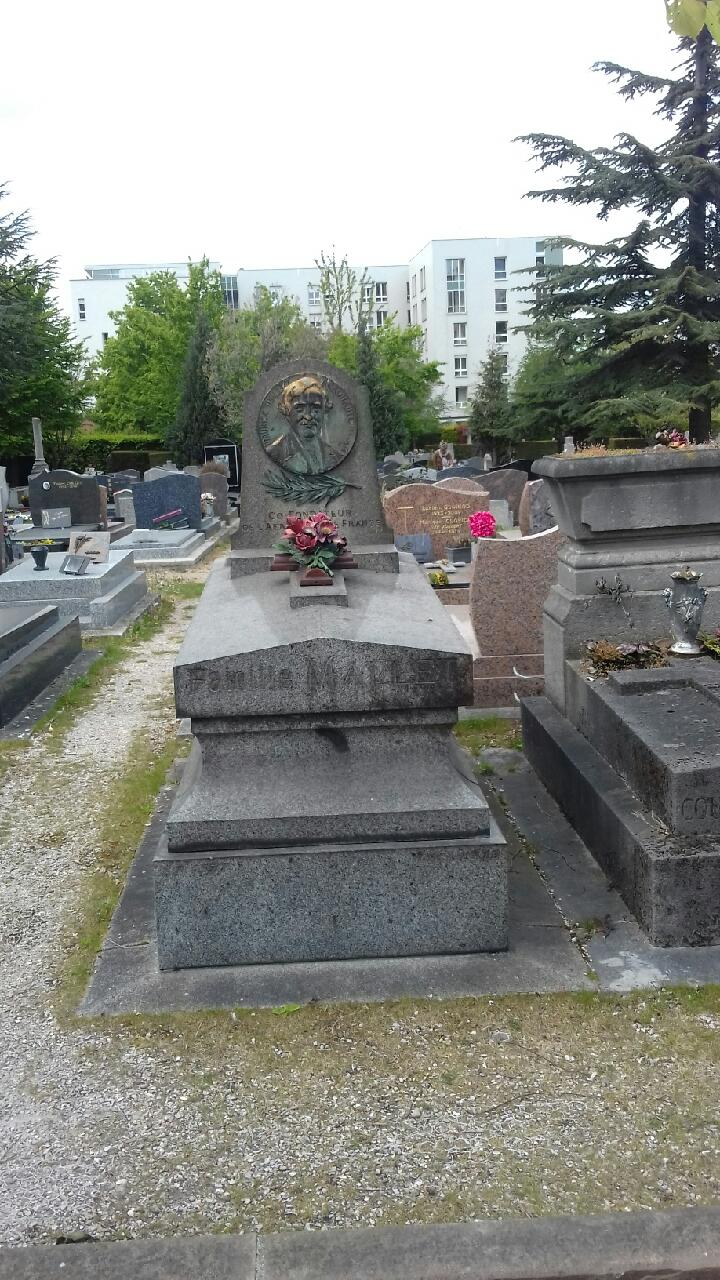
Grave in Courbevoie.

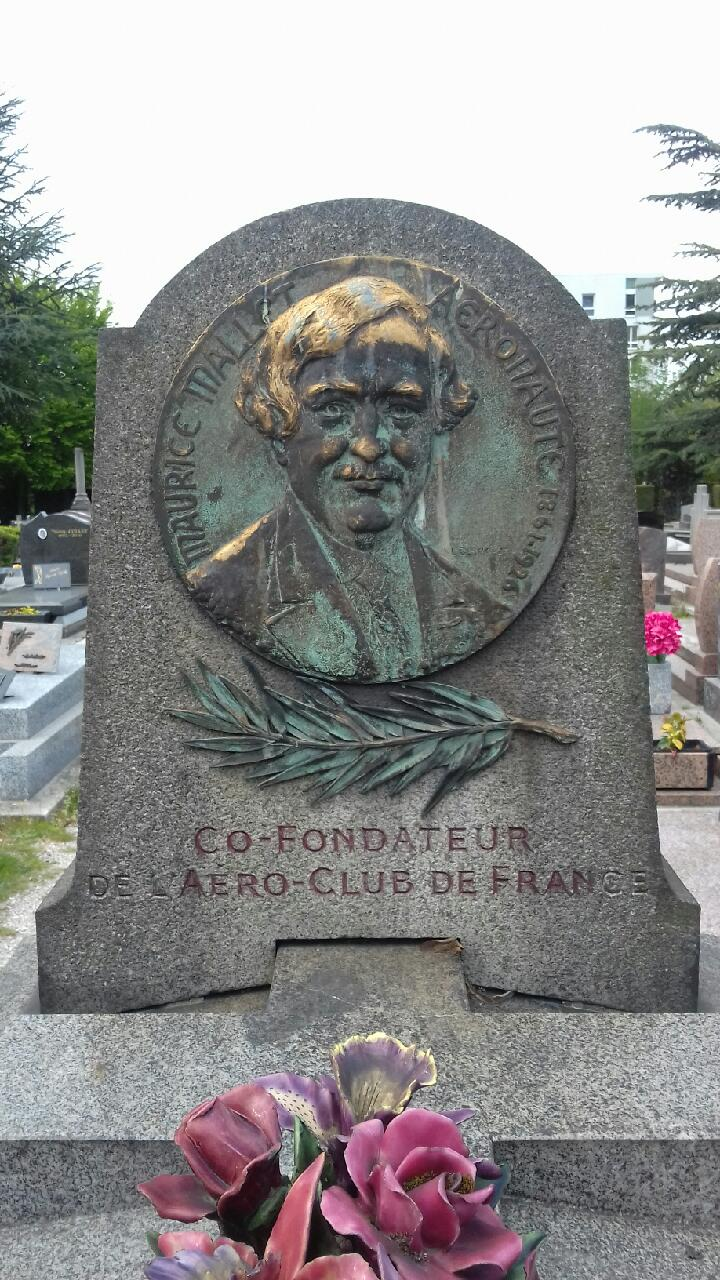
Grave in Courbevoie. Close-up.
