= Coventya =

- Company type: limited company
- Industry: Chemical Industry
- Founded: 1927 then known as Société Continentale Parker
- Headquarters: Villeneuve-la-Garenne, France
- Area served: Worldwide
- Key people: Erik Weyls Chief Executive Officer Torsten Becker Chief Financial Officer
- Products: Specialty Chemicals for surface finishing
- Revenue: ▲ approx 280 million euros
- Number of employees: ▲670 approx
- Website: www.coventya.com

COVENTYA Group is an international company which provides specialty chemicals for electroplating, surface finishing and friction control. These chemicals are used in the so-called GMF (General Metal Finishing) industry. Surface finishing is used in various industries such construction, sanitary, fashion, luxury goods, electronic or oil industry.

The group is present in more than 60 countries and employs more than 670 people (2018). Its global turnover is about 150 million Euros. The group was created in 1927 as Société Continentale Parker. The company was formerly part of the Chemetall group located in Frankfurt, Germany.

COVENTYA is represented worldwide with production sites in Brazil, Italy, Germany, United Kingdom, India, South Korea, China, Mexico, Turkey and the USA.

== History ==
COVENTYA's history is linked to Société Continentale Parker in Clichy (92, France). In 1927, four aviation pioneers: Louis Paulhan, Enea Bossi, Pierre Prier and Robert Deté created Société Continentale Parker on the basis of a license for Parkerisation from Parker Rust-Proof in Detroit (MI, USA). In 1930, Continentale Parker started its Plating activities based on a license agreement of Udylite also from Detroit. The first licensed product introduced into the market was an organic brightener for Cadmium plating.

During the 1960s, Continentale Parker specialized in the Plating of precious metals due to the distribution of Sel-Rex processes of Nutley (NJ, USA).

In 1965, the German group Metallgesellschaft AG acquired most of the shares of Société Continentale Parker. Later on, it was integrated into Chemetall GmbH, created in 1984, in order to regroup all of its specialty chemicals activities. The internationalization began with the setting-up of electroplating departments in Chemetall Benelux and Spain, followed in 1988 by a new external development policy targeted towards Western Europe:

- Barattini, Italy (1989)
- Polar, Italy (1993)
- TECS, France (1994)
- Pelidag, France (1995)
- Weiland, Germany (1996)

The group eliminated the diversity of names by creating a new single identity in 1998: Chemetall Plating Technologies.

The risky speculations of Metallgesellschaft on oil futures in 1993 eventually caused it to separate from the plating activity and led to the sale of the business in 2000, which then became COVENTYA.

Coventya continued to pursue the globalization trend, favoring the external development of the company by acquisition:

- Folke-Stigen, Sweden (2001)
- McGean Rohco Mexico (2002)
- CGT/Auromet, Italy (2002)
- CGL Quimica, Brazil (2003)
- Sirius Technologies, USA (2004)
- Coventya (Suzhou) Chemicals, China, (2006)
- Taskem, USA (2007)
- Palojoki, Finland (2008)
- Plating Business of Chemetall-Rai, India (2011)
- Molecular Technologies, UK (2012)
- Ecostar Co. Ltd South Korea (2012)
- Politeknik, Turkey (2017)
- Telbis Turkey (2017)
- MicroGLEIT, Germany (2018)

In June 2021, it was announced that Element Solutions, through its subsidiary MacDermid Enthone, would acquire the company. The takeover was completed in September of the same year.

== Capital Structure ==
After the acquisition of Société Continentale Parker in 1965, Chemetall GmbH was created in 1982, in order to manage all specialty chemicals of the group. Chemetall was then integrated in Dynamit Nobel in 1992, the new subsidiary of Metallgesellschaft.

In 2000, the activity became independent after an MBO (Management Buy-Out) with the support of Quadriga Capital, Frankfurt for the equity financing. After the exit of Quadriga in 2006, the French bank Natixis, via its subsidiary iXEN, took over the role of majority shareholder. A special feature of the structure was a significant shareholding of employees in the capital of the company. In 2011, Barclays Private Equity (renamed Equistone Partners Europe) took over the majority of the shares and the role of iXEN in its holding Coventya Holding SAS, with a registered office located in Clichy, France.

Since 2012, Coventya's headquarters are located in Villeneuve-la-Garenne (near Paris) and the major shareholder is presently the European investment fond Silverfleet Capital.

== Production Sites ==
- Gütersloh, Germany
- Pfaffenhofen, Germany
- Villorba, Italy
- Agliana, Italy
- Wolverhampton, UK
- Cleveland, Ohio, USA
- Mexico City
- Caxias do Sul, Brazil
- Suzhou, China
- Pune, India
- Cheonan, South Korea
- Johor, Malaysia
- Istanbul, Turkey

== Turnover ==
The Turnover distribution in 2017 was as follows:

- Europe: 57%
- Americas: 23%
- Asia: 20%

== Products ==
COVENTYA develops, manufactures and distributes a complete range of products for the plating industry such as:

- Preparation: Cleaners, Etching solutions, Chemical and Electrolytic Polishing Products
- Corrosion protection: Zinc and Zinc Alloys, Passivation, Chrome VI and Cobalt free conversion coatings and Top-coats
- Lubrication: Anti-friction Coatings, Lubricating Pastes
- Functional: Electroless Nickel and Hard Chrome
- Aluminium surface treatment: Cleaners, Etches, Surface Brighteners, Acid Deoxidizers and anodizing additives, as well as various Colouring Agents, Conversion Coatings and Sealants
- Decoration: Copper-Nickel-Chrome and their alloys, Trivalent Chrome
- Plating On Plastics: Wetting Agents, Neutralizers, Activators, Electroless Nickel For Plastic Metallization
- Precious metals: Complete range of pure metals and their alloys: Gold, Silver, Palladium, Rhodium, Platinum, Ruthenium (Nickel and Cadmium free options are available)
- Cathodic electrocoats: Wetting Agents, Solvents, Cataphoretic lacquers and colours
- Water treatment: Cationic and Anionic polymers, Metal precipitants, Flocculants as well as Organic and Silicone based Antifoams.

== See also ==
- Dynamit Nobel
