= Sopwith Bee =

General information
- Type: experimental aircraft
- National origin: United Kingdom
- Manufacturer: Sopwith Aviation Company
- Number built: 1

History
- First flight: 1916

The Sopwith Bee was a small biplane built in 1916 as a personal aircraft for Harry Hawker, Sopwith's chief test pilot.

== History ==
The Bee was a single-bay biplane powered by a 50 hp (37 kW) Gnome Omega rotary engine, intended for use by Hawker as a runabout and for aerobatics. As with contemporary Sopwith fighter aircraft, great effort was made to concentrate the heaviest components as close to the aircraft's centre of gravity in order to optimise manoeverability: this necessitated a large semi-circular cutout in the trailing edge of the upper wing to accommodate the pilot. Lateral control was achieved by wing warping.

The Bee was subsequently fitted with a single synchronised Vickers .303 machine gun, possibly with a view to meeting the Admiralty's requirement for a small scout aircraft capable of operating from torpedo-boat destroyers, but this came to nothing and no further development of the type was carried out.

The aircraft was sometimes referred to as the Tadpole.

== Specifications ==
Data from Mason

General characteristics

- Crew: 1
- Length: 14 ft 3 in (4.34 m)
- Wingspan: 16 ft 3 in (4.95 m)
- Powerplant: 1 × Gnome Omega 7-cylinder air-cooled rotary engine
- Propellers: 2-bladed

Armament

- One Vickers .303 machine gun
