= La Ville de Paris (airship) =

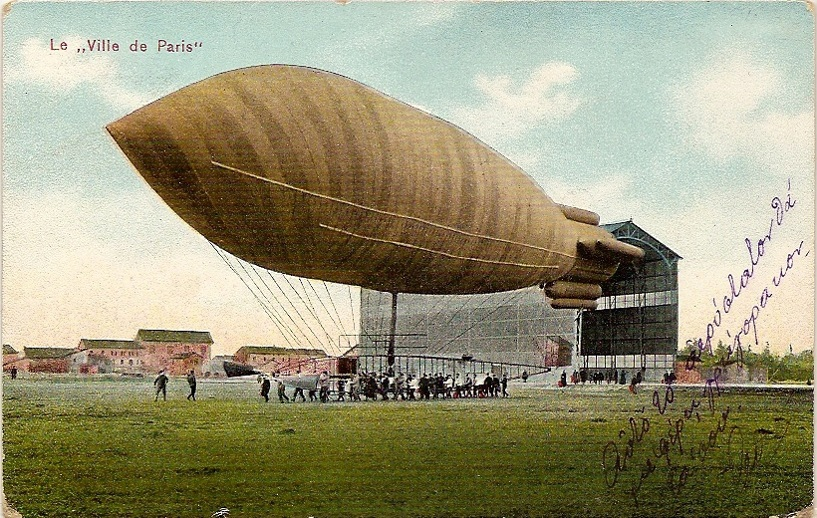

General information
- Type: Experimental dirigible
- Manufacturer: Édouard Surcouf
- Primary user: French Army
- Number built: 1

History
- First flight: November 11, 1906

The Ville de Paris was a dirigible constructed in 1906 for Henry Deutsch de la Meurthe by Édouard Surcouf.

== Design ==
La Ville de Paris was the second airship of this name commissioned by Deutsch de la Meurthe: the first, built in 1902-3 and constructed by Maurice Mallet and designed by Victor Tatin was unsuccessful.

The airship was designed by the prominent balloon manufacturer Édouard Surcouf and Henry Kapférer. It was powered by a 70 hp 4-cylinder Argus engine driving a single propeller at the front of the nacelle via a 5:1 reduction gearbox. The engine also drove a pump to maintain pressure in the internal ballonet. The nacelle was a square-section wire-braced wooden structure which had been used in the unsuccessful design of 1902, and carried a pair of rudders at the rear and a pair of biplane elevators. The most novel feature of the design were the tail surfaces, which consisted of elongated tubes inflated with hydrogen. These were the result of research carried out by Charles Renard.

== Operational history ==
After trim trials on 23 October 1906 and a tethered engine trial on 27 October, La Ville de Paris made its first flight on 11 November 1906, piloted by Surcouf and Kapferer, with Louis Paulhan as mechanic. The flight was marred by problems with the engine, and after crossing the Forest of Saint-Germain the airship was landed at Chambourcy after 1 h 20 min in the air, after which it was deflated and returned by road to Sartrouville.

Following this flight it was decided to replace the four-year-old keel structure because of the state of the wood from which it was constructed. A second pair of elevators were added amidships: these were constructed by Voisin Freres, as was the propeller. The Argus engine was replaced by a Chenu of the same power.

The reconstructed airship was inflated in June 1907 and after a series of tethered trials made its first free flight on 9 August, a short circuit returning to Sartrouville. Several similar successful short flights followed, on the seventh of which Deutsch de la Meurthe was carried as a passenger. Subsequent flights carried several notable members of the French aviation community including Ferdinand Ferber and Ernest Archdeacon

Having made 20 flights, it was then deflated and some modifications were made, including the removal of one ballonet and modifications to the control surfaces. Flights were resumed on 14 November, when a flight over central Paris was made. Further flights over Paris, including a visit to the military flying field at Issy-les-Moulineaux were made in November, including one carrying Charles Rolls and Frank Hedges Butler as passengers.

Deutsch de la Meurthe then placed the airship at the disposal of the French Army, to replace the Lebaudy Patrie which had recently been torn from its mooring in a storm and lost, following which some flights were made carrying Army personnel in order to familiarise them with the airship.

A longer flight was made on 18 December, when it was flown from Sartrouville to Lagny and back covering a distance of around 110 km (68 mi) and another long flight was made on 24 December from Sartrouville to Coulommiers and back; the flight lasted 5 hours 10 minutes and covered 139 km (86 mi), setting a new French record for a closed-circuit flight.

On 15 January 1908, as usual piloted by Kapferer with Paulhan as mechanic, it was flown from Sartrouville to the French Army establishment at Verdun, a distance of 260 km (160 mi). The flight took 9hr 38 min, including 1 hr 25 min during which the airship had landed in order to make repairs to the engine. Two more flights were made at Verdun before it was deflated at the end of January.

After delivery to the French army it was lengthened to 66 m (216 ft 6 in), increasing its capacity to 3,600 m^{3} (130,000 ft^{3}). In its modified form it was first flown on 16 November 1908, when a trial flight was curtailed by the failure of a pinion in the reduction gearbox. The airship was brought down at the military maneuvering ground at Jardin-Fontaine 6 km (3.7 mi) from its base and had to be walked back to the flying field at Verdun. Repairs were completed by 20 November, and after static engine trials it made seven short flights between 24 November and 2 December. On 7 December it was deflated.

It was still in use in 1910, when several flights were made in August during the military maneuvers in Picardy, during one of which experiments were made with aerial photography.

== Specifications ==
Data from l'Aérophile

General characteristics

- Crew: 2
- Capacity: 2
- Length: 62 m (203 ft 5 in) approx.
- Diameter: 10.5 m (34 ft 5 in)
- Volume: 3,200 m^{3} (110,000 cu ft)
- Powerplant: 1 × Chenu 4-cylinder piston engine, 52 kW (70 hp)
- Propellers: 2-bladed Voisin Frères, 6 m (19 ft 8 in) diameter
