= Paulhan-Tatin Aéro-Torpille No.1 =

French aircraft

Aéro-Torpille No.1
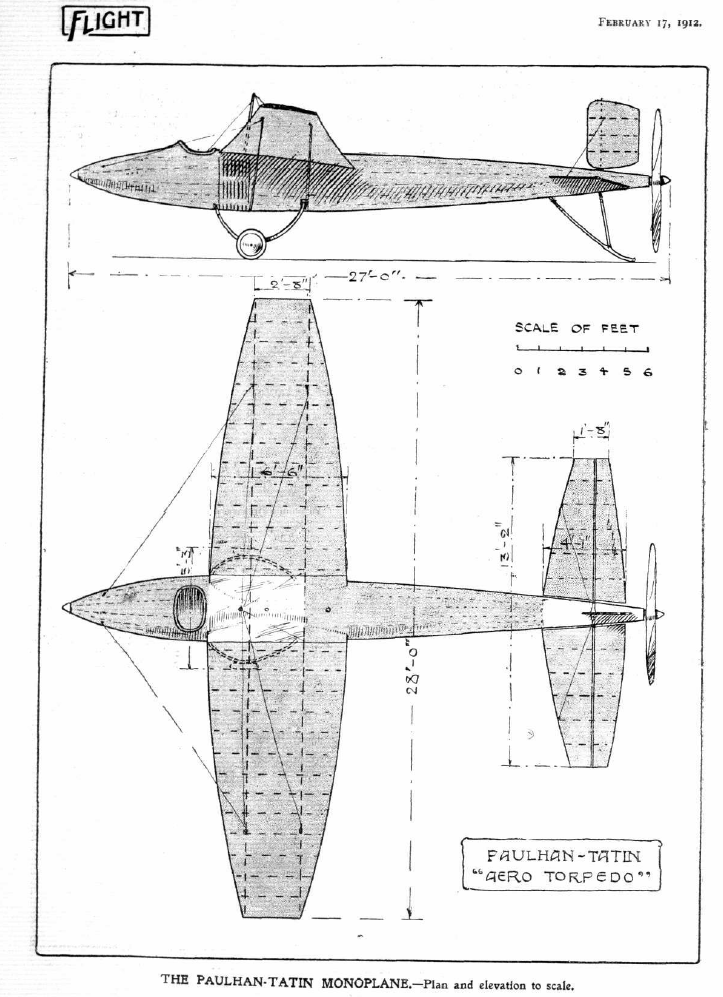
- Drawing of the Aéro-Torpille from Flight, 1912.

General information
- Type: Experimental aircraft
- National origin: France
- Designer: Victor Tatin
- Number built: 1

History
- First flight: 1911

The Paulhan-Tatin Aéro-Torpille No.1, (also known as Paulhan-Tatin Aero Torpedo), was a French experimental aircraft built in 1911 as a collaboration between the famous pilot Louis Paulhan and Victor Tatin, a scientist who had experimented with various types of flying models and in 1879 had made the first model aircraft to take off under its own power.

== Design and development ==
The Aéro-Torpille No.1 created great interest during the 1911 Salon de l’Aéronautique at the Grand Palais in Paris due to its novel design and streamlined appearance. Great care had been taken in the design to eliminate drag, and the design had been tested on Gustave Eiffel's wind tunnel.

The aircraft had a streamlined circular section fuselage which entirely enclosed the 50 hp (37 kW) Gnome rotary engine, which drove a pusher configuration propeller mounted at the back of the fuselage, connected to the engine by a long driveshaft. The structure of the fuselage was a conventional square-section wire-braced wood structure, outside which were circular formers bearing a series of stringers to support the fabric covering. Initially a universal joint was fitted at the engine end of the driveshaft, but in tests the girder construction of the fuselage proved rigid enough for this not to be necessary, and the long tube forming the driveshaft was simply held by six ballraces attached to the structure by wires, to eliminate whip. The section of the fuselage containing the engine was covered by louvred aluminium panels, removable for maintenance of the engine. The wings had curved leading and trailing edges, were tapered in planform and were curved upwards at the wing tips. Flight loads were transmitted to the bottom of the fuselage by a pair of steel ribbons on either side. The rearmost of these also operated the wing warping for lateral control. The pilot sat immediately in front of the leading edge of the wing. Even the undercarriage was of novel design, consisting of a pair of semi-circular lengths of hickory, hinged at the front and attached to the fuselage by bungee cords and bearing a pair of wheels whose spokes were covered. Tail surfaces consisted of a fixed tailplane with trailing-edge elevators and a small rectangular balanced rudder.

The aircraft was flown during October 1911 and in February achieved a measured speed of 150 km/h (93 mph). In March it was sold to the Italian aviator Signor Bosse.

== Specifications ==
General characteristics

- Crew: 1
- Length: 8.5 m (28 ft)
- Wingspan: 8.5 m (28 ft)
- Wing area: 13 m^{2} (140 sq ft)
- Empty weight: 363 kg (800 lb)
- Powerplant: 1 × Gnome 7 Omega 7-cyl. air-cooled rotary piston engine, 37 kW (50 hp)
- Propellers: 2-bladed Régy Frères, 2.4 m (8 ft) diameter

Performance
