= Paulhan biplane =

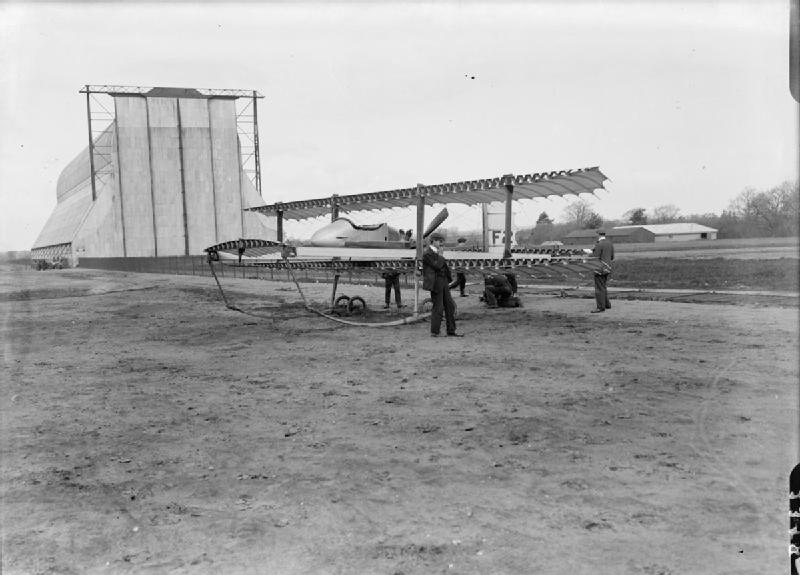
- Paulhan biplane at the Royal Aircraft Factory, Farnborough.

General information
- Type: Experimental aircraft
- National origin: France
- Designer: Louis Paulhan
- Number built: 3

History
- First flight: 1910

The Paulhan biplane was a French experimental aircraft designed in 1910 by the successful aviator Louis Paulhan in collaboration with Henri Fabre. The prototype became the second aircraft bought by the British War Office: two further examples, differing in constructional detail, were built.

== Design and development ==
Although the general arrangement of the aircraft was conventional for the time, being a pusher biplane with a front-mounted elevator and a rear-mounted horizontal stabiliser and rudder, it had a number of extremely unorthodox constructional details. The most obvious was the construction of the wings, which had a single spar forming the leading edges of the wings which was an exposed warren truss of a type designed and patented by Fabre. The ribs were cantilevered from this spar, each rib being enclosed in a pocket in the covering, which was laced to the leading edge and attached to the trailing edge end of each rib by a spring clip. The other flying surfaces were similar. The wings were connected by four single interplane struts, the central pair attached to booms (also Fabre girders) bearing the forward-mounted elevator and a rear-mounted rudder mounted in front of an adjustable horizontal stabilising surface. The aluminium-covered nacelle, in which the pilot and passenger were seated side by side) in front of the 37 kW (50 hp) Gnome Omega rotary engine, was suspended between the wings by steel cables which were attached to the ends of the central pair of interplane struts. The undercarriage consisted of a pair of long skids mounted on extensions of the inner interplane struts and connected to the forward extremities of the fuselage booms, each bearing a pair of wheels on a short axle. A tailskid which could be moved by the pilot to act as a brake was carried on the lower end of the rudder mounting.

The second example retained the same general arrangement but differed considerably in constructional detail. The Fabre lattice girders were replaced by conventional spars, the single interplane struts replaced by more conventional paired struts and the tail surfaces altered to a cruciform arrangement, with the rudder divided into two sections above and below the stabiliser. The trim of the aircraft could be altered on the ground by adjusting the bracing cables for the tail surfaces.

== Operational history ==
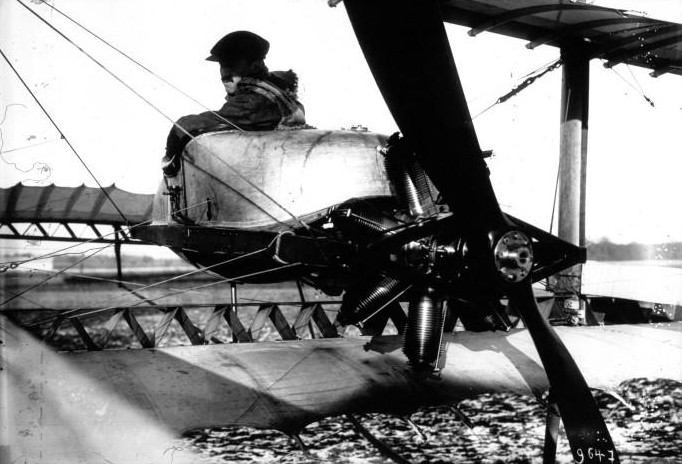
Close-up of nacelle and engine installation

After being exhibited at the 1910 Paris Aero Salon, a few short flights were made by Paulhan at the end of October at Saint-Cyr-l'Ecole and showed what Flight described as "satisfying flight behavior". A public demonstration of the aircraft was later made on 26 November by Albert Caillé, including two return flights betewwen St Cyr and Buc. Paulhan wanted this demonstration of his aircraft to be made by someone other than himself, in case its success was attributed solely to his skill as a pilot. (Caillé was a former pupil at Paulhan's flying school who had only been awarded his Aero Club de France license at the beginning of September.) Commercial rights for Great Britain had been acquired by George Holt Thomas, who succeeded in interesting the British War Office in the aircraft. After a demonstration flight during which it met the War Office's demands of a two-hour flight with a passenger and (200 kg (441 lb) of ballast in a 40 kmh (25 mph) wind and a gliding flight from a height of 200 m (626 ft), an example was ordered and early January 1911 Caillé successfully put it through a series of tests at Buc. Captain Fulton from the British Army witnessed the tests and accepted the aircraft on January 11, 1911. It was subsequently flown at the Royal Aircraft Factory, where it did not impress,.

== Specifications ==
Data from Munson, 1969.

General characteristics

- Crew: 1
- Capacity: 1
- Length: 8.58 m (28 ft 2 in)
- Wingspan: 12.19 m (40 ft 0 in)
- Wing area: 20 m^{2} (220 sq ft)
- Gross weight: 165 kg (363 lb)
- Powerplant: 1 × Gnome Omega 7-cylinder rotary piston engine, 37 kW (50 hp)
- Propellers: 2-bladed Normale
