= Paalson Type 1 =

Type 1
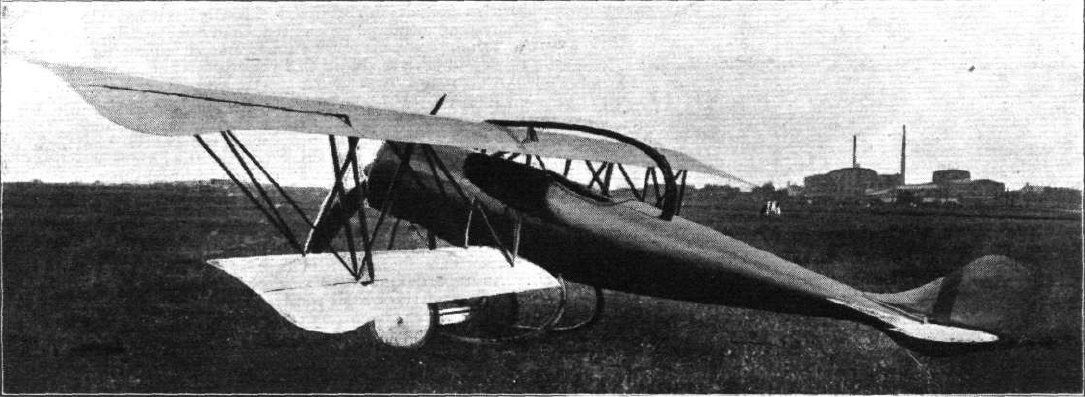

General information
- Type: Single seat sport aircraft
- National origin: Sweden
- Manufacturer: Paalson Flygplan, Malmö
- Number built: c.1

History
- First flight: before early 1920

The Paalson Type 1, (Pålson), was a Swedish single-seat sport aircraft built around 1920. It was of conventional single-seat biplane layout but had some unusual features such as girder type interplane struts, a novel main undercarriage axle mounting and a mechanism allowing adjustment of the angle of incidence of the upper wing.

== Design ==
The distinguishing feature of Paalson's biplane designs, the Type 1 sporting single-seater and the six passenger Type 2, was a mechanism allowing the alteration of the position and angle of incidence of the upper wing. That apart, they were conventional single-engine aircraft of their time, though the Type 1's Warren truss interplane struttage was uncommon.

The Paalson Type 1 was a wooden aircraft with flying surfaces and fuselage covered in 3-ply plywood. Its wings were unswept and of constant chord, the lower wing having a shorter span and mounted with marked stagger. The three sets of interplane struts on each side did not divide the wing into the usual bays as each pair sloped diagonally as part of a Warren girder structure. There were ailerons, which increased in chord towards their tips, on both upper and lower wings. The novel wing adjustment mechanism involved a long tubular member which curved upwards and forwards from the fuselage behind the cockpit to the main spar and leading edge of the upper wing

The Type 1 had a smooth-skinned, tapering, round cross section fuselage with a 37 kW (50 hp) cowled Gnôme-type rotary engine driving a two-bladed tractor propeller in the nose and an open cockpit aft of the wing trailing edge. The tail surfaces were rounded with separate elevators. It had a fixed conventional undercarriage with mainwheels on a single axle mounted on unusual curved skid-like members, with a tailskid.

The Paalson Type 1 had made its first flight by May 1920.

== Specifications ==
Data from Flight 13 May 1920

General characteristics

- Crew: one
- Length: 5.69 m (18 ft 8 in)
- Wingspan: 8.00 m (26 ft 3 in)
- Height: 2.30 m (7 ft 7 in)
- Empty weight: 320 kg (705.5 lb)
- Gross weight: 500 kg (1,102 lb)
- Powerplant: 1 × Gnome 7 Omega or Pålson rotary, 37 kW (50 hp)
- Propellers: 2-bladed

Performance

- Maximum speed: 130 km/h (81 mph, 70 kn)
- Wing loading: 107.6 kg/m^{2} (22.04 lb/sq ft)
