= Porter Gyropachute =

1910s British VTOL aircraft

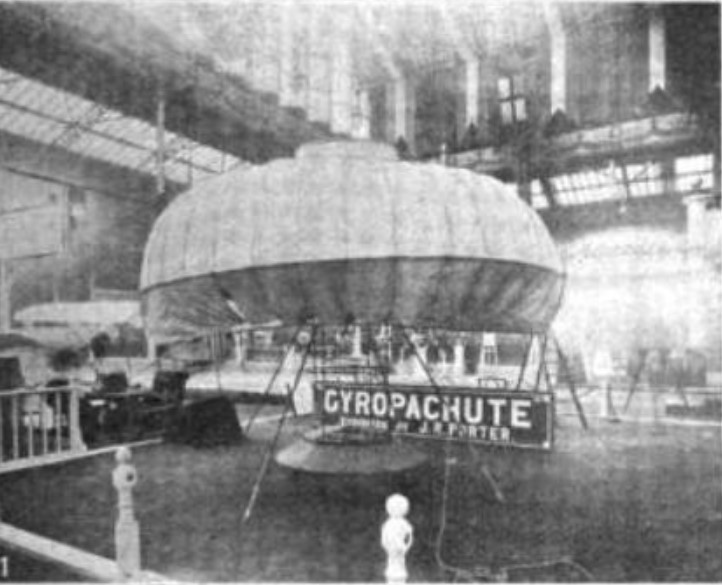
- Porter Gyropachute on display at the 1913 Olympic Aero Show, London

General information
- Type: VTOL aircraft
- Manufacturer: James Robertson Porter
- Number built: 1

History
- Introduction date: 1913

The Porter Gyropachute was a 1910s experimental direct-lift machine designed by James Robertson Porter.

== Design and development ==
James Robertson Porter was an Australian-born civil engineer, resident in the United Kingdom, who became interested in flight in the mid-1900s. He developed a series of un-crewed test-rigs which incorporated annular fans fitted with vertical blades, drawing air down and through a set of two superimposed annular surfaces.

Porter's fourth, and first full-size, craft was called the Gyropachute. It consisted primarily of two superimposed parachute-shaped surfaces. An opening of 3 ft (0.91 m) diameter in the uppermost surface allowed air to be drawn in by 6 ft (1.8 m) wide impeller, fitted with vertical blades, powered by a 50 hp (37 kW) Gnome rotary engine. The air would be expelled out through an annular shroud created by the lowermost surface, creating lift. Segmented flexible skirts arranged around the circumference of the outer shroud could be controlled by the pilot, via a steering wheel, to manoeuvre the craft.

The Gyropachute was exhibited at the 1913 Olympia Aero Show. It is not known if the craft was tested, or if it flew.

== Specifications ==
Data from British Aircraft Before the Great War

General characteristics

- Crew: 1
- Diameter: 14 ft (4.3 m)
- Height: 11 ft (3.4 m)
- Wing area: 400 sq ft (37 m^{2})
- Empty weight: 350 lb (159 kg)
- Powerplant: 1 × Gnome 7 Omega seven cylinder rotary, 50 hp (37 kW)

Performance
