= DM-11 mine =

DM-11
- Type: Blast mine
- Place of origin: Germany

Service history
- Used by: Angola, Eritrea, Ethiopia, Mozambique, Somalia, Sweden, Zambia

Specifications
- Height: 95 mm
- Diameter: 300 mm
- Effective firing range: 20m
- Filling weight: 28.35 g

The DM-11 is a German anti-tank mine popular in countries of Africa, not suited to be disarmed or neutralized.
