= Allasio =

Allasio is an Italian surname. Notable people with the surname include:

- Federico Allasio (1914–1987), Italian footballer
- Marisa Allasio (born 1936), Italian actress
