= Victor Tatin =

French aviation pioneer

- Born: 1843; Paris
- Died: 18 April 1913
- Occupations: Aeronautical inventor and engineer
- Honours: Chevalier of the Légion d'honneur

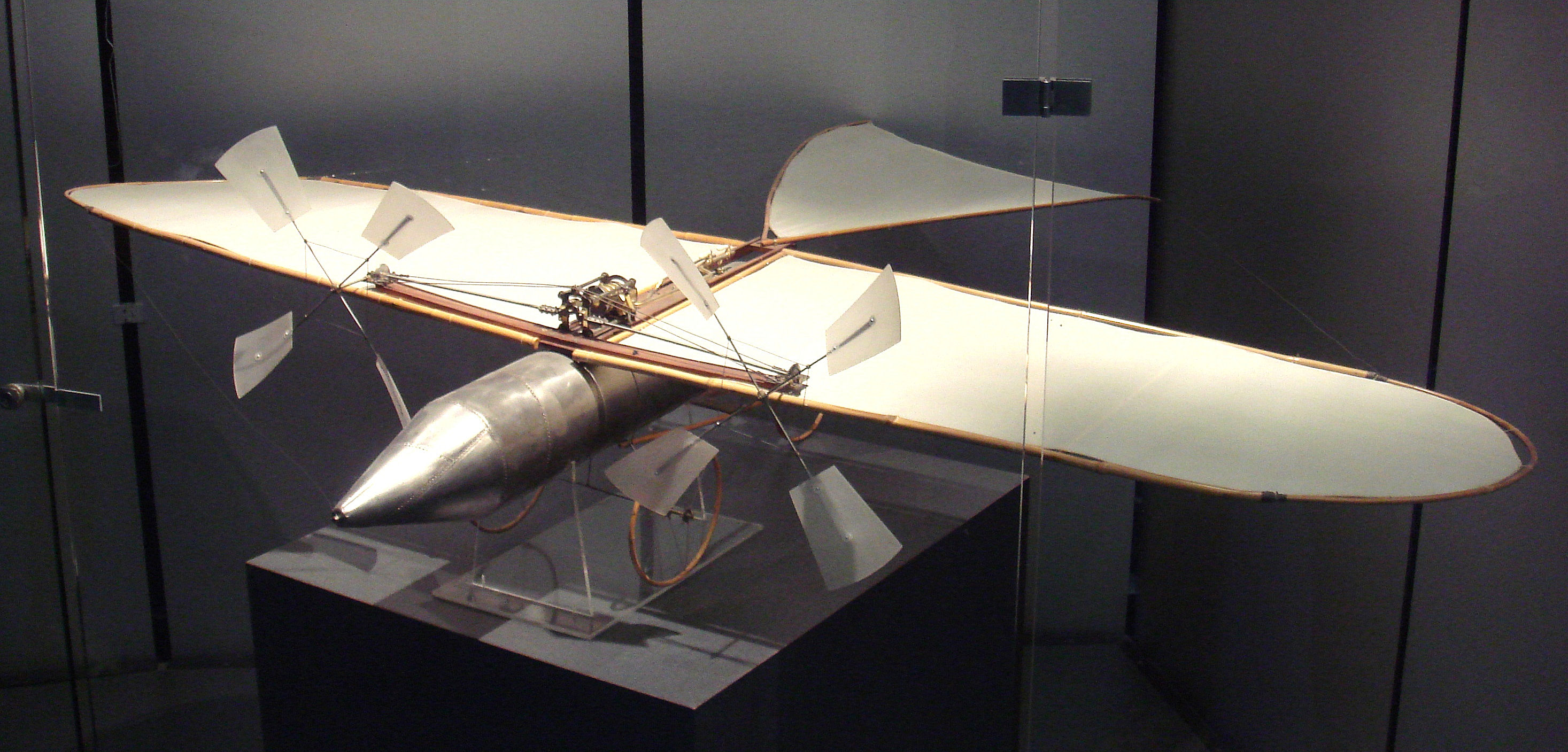
Victor Tatin airplane of 1879. Original craft, at Musée de l'Air et de l'Espace.

Victor Tatin (1843–1913) was a French engineer who created an early airplane, the Aéroplane, in 1879. The craft was the first model airplane to take off using its own power after a run on the ground.

The model had a span of 1.90 m (6 ft 3 in) and weighed 1.8 kg (4.0 lb). It had twin propellers and was powered by a compressed-air engine. It was flown tethered to a central pole on a circular track at the military facilities of Chalais-Meudon. Running under its own power it took off at a speed of 8 metres per second.

Between 1890 and 1897 Tatin and Charles Richet experimented with a steam-powered model with a wingspan of 6.6 m (21 ft 8 in) and weighing 33 kg (73 lb) with fore and aft propellers. They succeeded in flying this for a distance of 140 metres (460 ft) at a speed of 18 metres per second. In 1902-3 he collaborated with Maurice Mallet on the construction of the dirigible Ville de Paris for Henri Deutsch de la Meurthe and in 1905 he designed the propeller used by Traian Vuia for his experimental aircraft of 1906-7. In 1908 Tatin designed an unsuccessful pusher monoplane which was exhibited at the 1908 Paris Aéro Salon. In 1911 he collaborated with Louis Paulhan on the design of the Aéro-Torpille, a monoplane with a remarkably streamlined design.

== Works ==
- Victor Tatin, Elements d'aviation (Paris: Dunod et Pinet, 1908).

== See also ==
- Early flying machines
