= Caudron Type A =

Early French fixed-wing aircraft

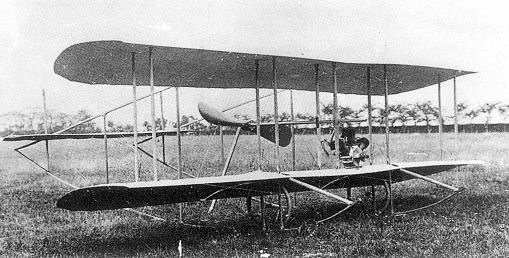
- Caudron Type A No 1. First powered aircraft made by the Caudron brothers.

General information
- Type: Experimental aircraft
- National origin: France
- Manufacturer: Caudron
- Designer: René Caudron
- Number built: 7

History
- First flight: 1910

The Caudron Type A was the first successful aircraft built by René Caudron and his brother Gaston. During 1910 the Caudron brothers were briefly associated with the Société Anonyme Français d'Aviation (S.A.F.A.), and an example of the type was exhibited at the 1910 Paris Aero Salon as the S.A.F.A. Biplane.

== Design and development ==
The Caudron brothers began aviation experimentation in 1908, building a large biplane which they intended to power using a pair of 30 hp (22 kW) Farcot engines. However the engines were never delivered, and instead it was flown by René as a glider, being towed into the air by a horse.

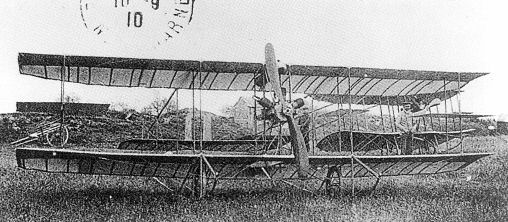
Type A. No 2, with direct drive tractor prop and interplane ailerons

This experiment was followed by the Caudron Type A No.1 which was a two-bay equal span pusher configured biplane. Much smaller and lighter than the glider, Type A No 1 was fitted with a 25 hp (19 kW) three-cylinder Anzani engine mounted on the lower wing to the pilots left, driving a two bladed propeller via a chain and driveshaft. Four booms carried a fixed rectangular horizontal surface which could be warped uniformly to act as an elevator or differentially, combined with the wing-warping, to aid lateral control. A pair of small rectangular rudders were mounted above the tailplane. The upper pair of booms were attached to the upper wing, as in other contemporary designs, but the lower pair were connected to the lower wing by struts and continued forwards and curved upwards to form the skids of the undercarriage. This distinctive arrangement was to become a characteristic of later Caudron aircraft. The aircraft was substantially damaged in a crash on its 9th flight, and during rebuilding the engine installation was modified so that the engine drove the pusher propeller directly.

Type A No.2 was the second aircraft built differing in having the engine mounted in a mid-gap position in front of the pilot driving a tractor configured propeller and in having interplane ailerons located between the upper and lower wings for lateral control.

The Type A bis was a larger two-seat airframe with a five-cylinder Anzani engine of 45 hp (34 kW).

== Variants ==
Type A No.1
First prototype with wing warping and pusher propeller. One built.
Type A No.2
Tractor propeller and mid-span ailerons. Three built.
Type A bis
Two seat version. Three built.

== Specifications (Type A) ==
Data from Munson 1969, p.75.

General characteristics

- Crew: one
- Length: 8 m (26 ft 3 in)
- Wingspan: 8 m (26 ft 3 in)
- Wing area: 22 m^{2} (240 sq ft)
- Gross weight: 270 kg (595 lb)
- Powerplant: 1 × Anzani 5-cylinder air cooled semi-radial, 34 kW (45 hp)
- Propellers: 2-bladed Normale

Performance

- Maximum speed: 85 km/h (53 mph, 46 kn)
