= Gnome Omega =

1900s French aircraft piston engine

Omega
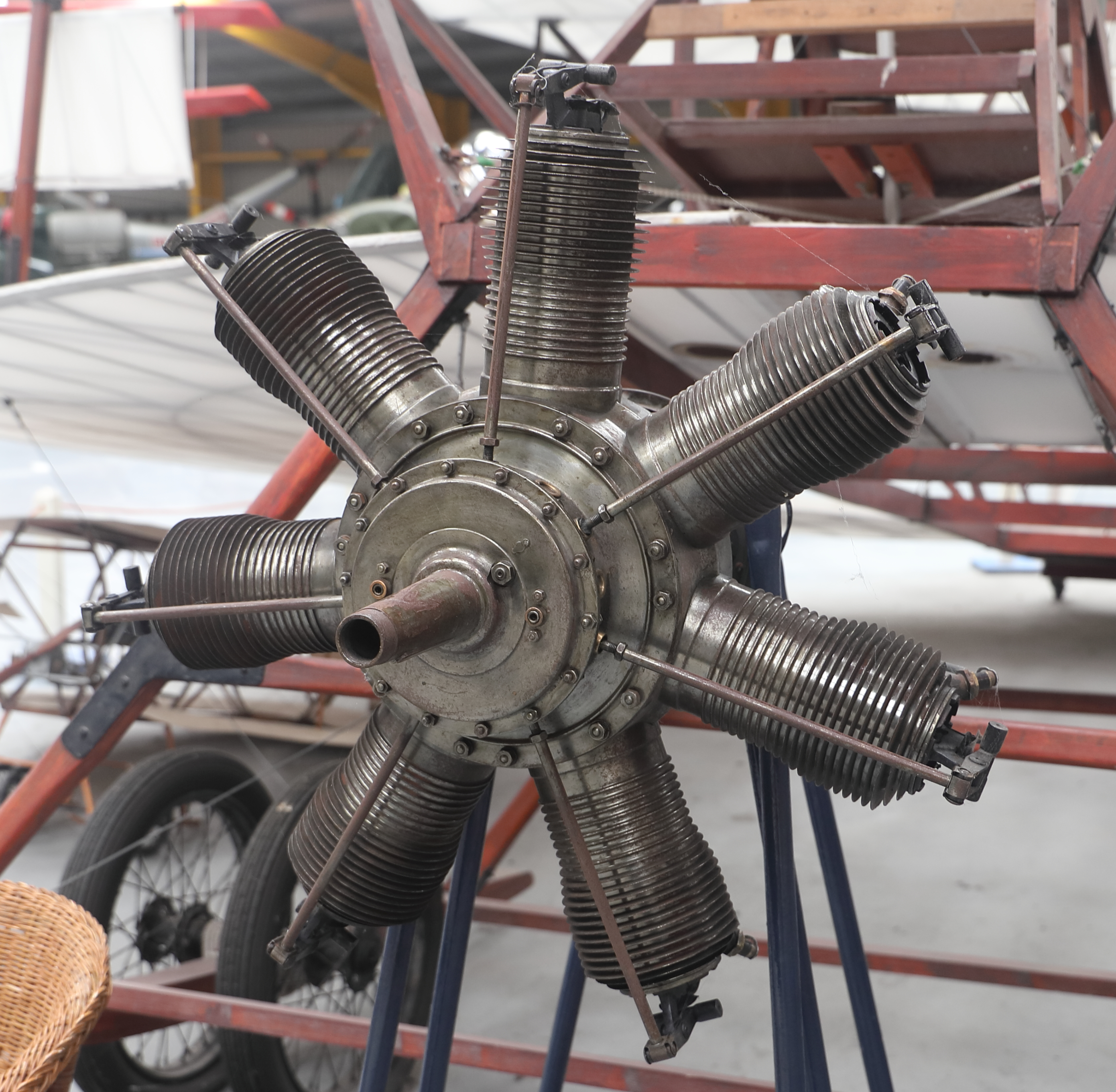
- Gnome 7 Omega on display at the Newark Air Museum
- Type: Rotary aero engine
- Manufacturer: Société des Moteurs Gnome
- First run: 1908
- Major applications: Blériot XI; Bristol Boxkite
- Number built: 4,000 until 1914

The Gnome 7 Omega (commonly called the Gnome 50 hp) is a French seven-cylinder, air-cooled aero engine produced by Gnome et Rhône. It was shown at the Paris Aero Salon held in December 1908 and was first flown in 1909. It was the world's first aviation rotary engine produced in quantity. Its introduction revolutionized the aviation industry and it was used by many early aircraft. It produced 37 kW (50 hp) from its 8 L (490 cu in) engine capacity. A Gnome Omega engine powers the 1912 Blackburn Monoplane, owned and operated by the Shuttleworth Collection, the oldest known airworthy British-designed aeroplane worldwide. A two-row version of the same engine was also produced, known as the Gnome 14 Omega-Omega or Gnome 100 hp. The prototype Omega engine still exists, and is on display at the United States' National Air and Space Museum.

Like all early Gnome et Rhône engines the Omega features a single pushrod driven exhaust valve on the cylinder head; the intake valve is located in the piston crown, opening by inertia on the downstroke and feeding the intake charge from the crankcase into the upper part of the cylinder. No throttle is provided, the pilot controls the aircraft's speed by switching off the ignition when necessary.

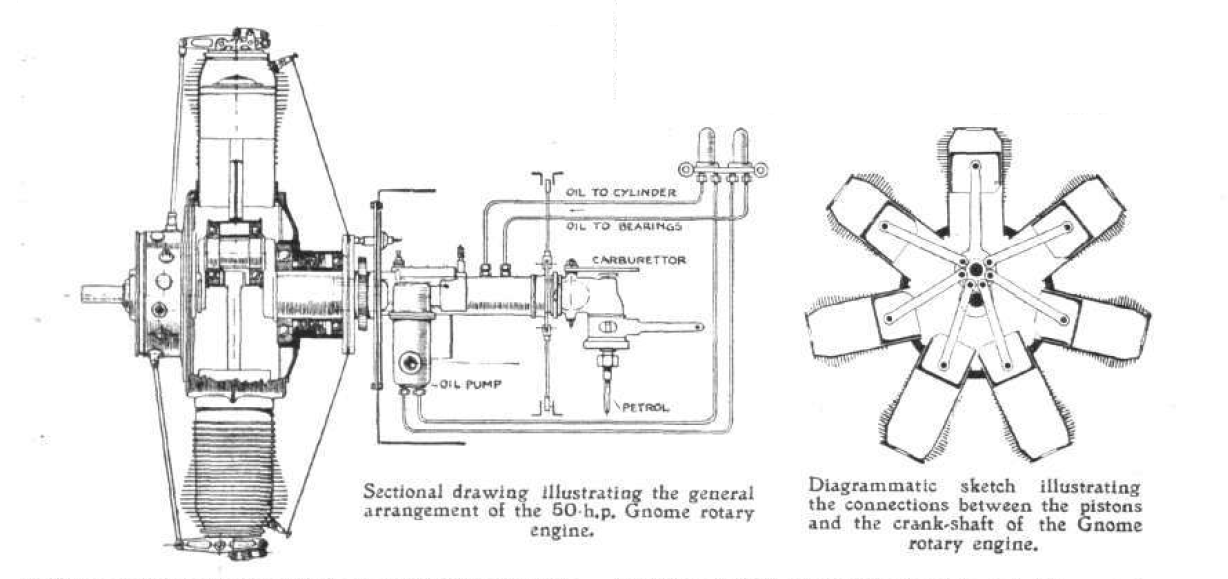
sectional views of the Gnome Omega

== Variants ==
Gnome 7 Omega
Single-row 7-cyl. original version; 50 hp (37 kW).
Gnome 14 Omega-Omega
Two-row, 14-cylinder version using Omega cylinders; 100 hp (75 kW).

== Applications ==
=== Gnome 7 Omega ===
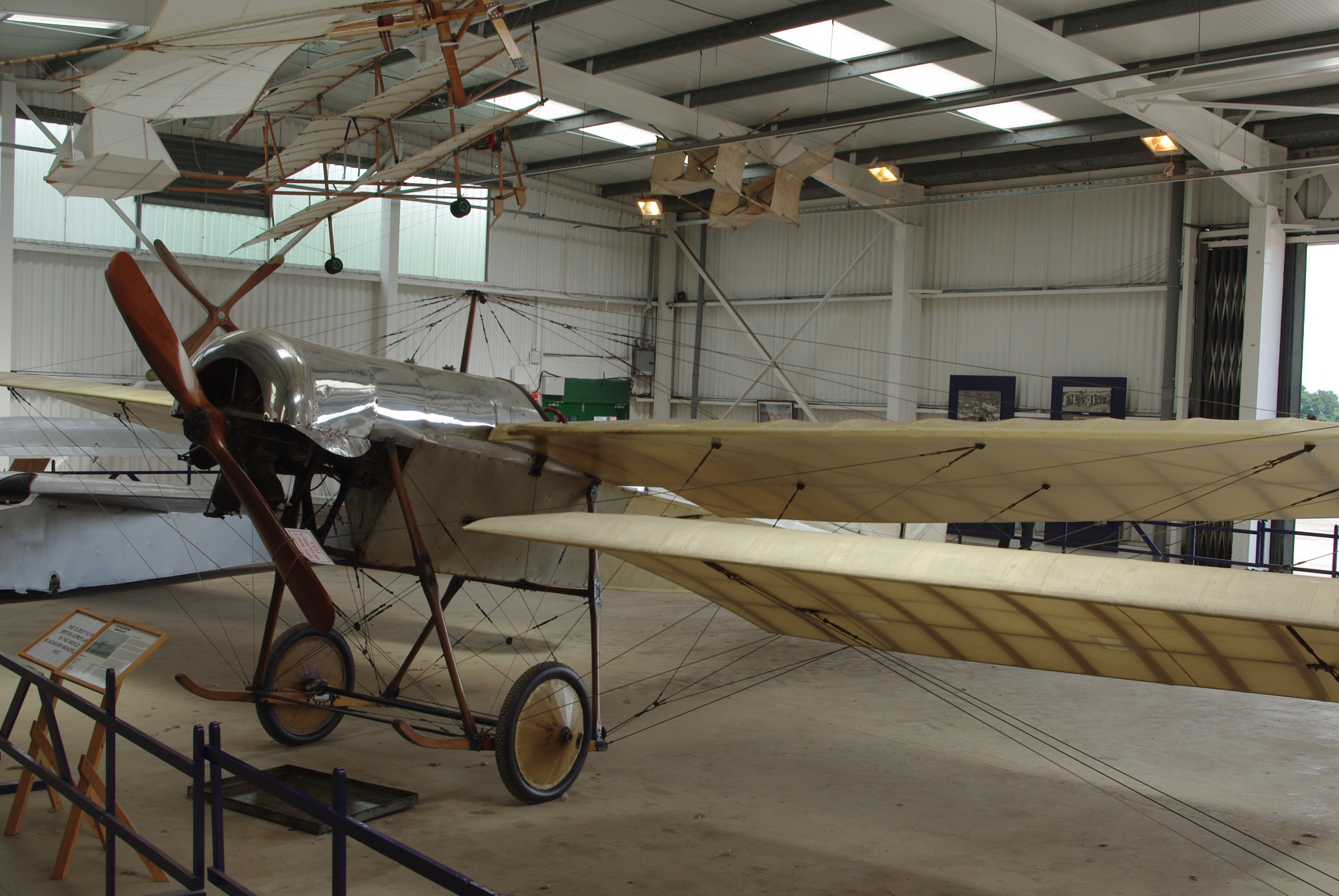
Gnome Omega-powered airworthy Blackburn Monoplane of the Shuttleworth Collection

- A Vlaicu I
- A Vlaicu II
- ASL Valkyrie
- Avro Type 500
- Avro-Burga Monoplane
- Blackburn Mercury
- Blackburn Type D Monoplane
- Blériot XI
- Breguet Type III
- Breguet Type IV
- Bristol Boxkite
- Bristol Racing Biplane
- Bristol Monoplane
- Bristol-Prier P.1
- Bristol-Coanda School Monoplane
- Bristol-Coanda T.B.8
- Castaibert III
- Caudron Type B
- Deperdussin 1910 monoplane
- François Denhaut's flying boat
- Fabre Hydravion
- Farman HF.6 Militaire
- Farman III
- FBA Type A
- Grahame-White Type VII
- Grahame-White Type XV
- Howard Wright 1910 Biplane
- Koolhoven Heidevogel
- Lakes Waterbird
- London and Provincial Fuselage Biplane
- Morane-Borel monoplane
- Nieuport II
- Paalson Type 1
- Paulhan-Tatin Aéro-Torpille No.1
- Paulhan biplane
- Pemberton-Billing P.B.9
- Porter Gyropachute
- Radley-England waterplanes
- Royal Aircraft Factory B.E.3
- Royal Aircraft Factory B.E.4
- Royal Aircraft Factory F.E.2
- Sommer 1910 biplane
- Short S.27
- Short Tandem Twin
- Short Triple Twin
- Short S.47 Triple Tractor
- Short S.62
- Sopwith Bee
- Sopwith Sparrow
- Van Meel Brikken
- Vickers No.6 Monoplane
- Vickers No.7 Monoplane
- Vickers Boxkite School Biplane
- Voisin 1907 biplane
- Voisin Type de Course
- Voisin L

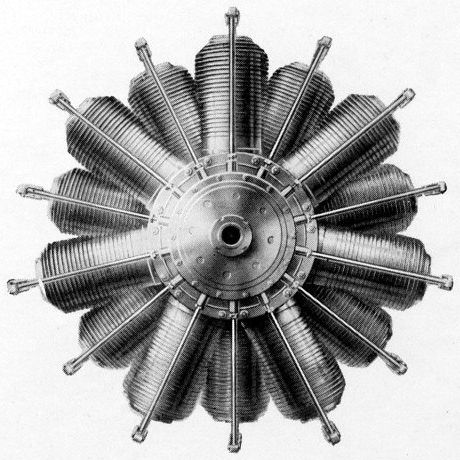
Gnome 14 Omega-Omega, as shown in a 1913 Gnome catalog.

=== Gnome 14 Omega-Omega ===
- Avro 501
- Blériot XIII
- Bleriot XXIII
- Bristol-Gordon England G.E.2
- Coventry Ordnance Works Biplane 10
- Deperdussin 1912 Racing Monoplane
- Nieuport IV.H floatplane
- Short S.41 Tractor Biplane
- Short S.57 Seaplane
- Short S.64 Folder Seaplane
- Short Admiralty Type 74

== Engines on display ==
- The very first Gnome rotary engine ever built, Gnôme Omega No. 1, is on display at the National Air and Space Museum, Washington, D.C.
- A preserved production Gnome 7 Omega engine is on public display at the Royal Air Force Museum London.
- A restored Omega is on display at the New England Air Museum, Windsor Locks, CT.

== Specifications (7 Omega) ==
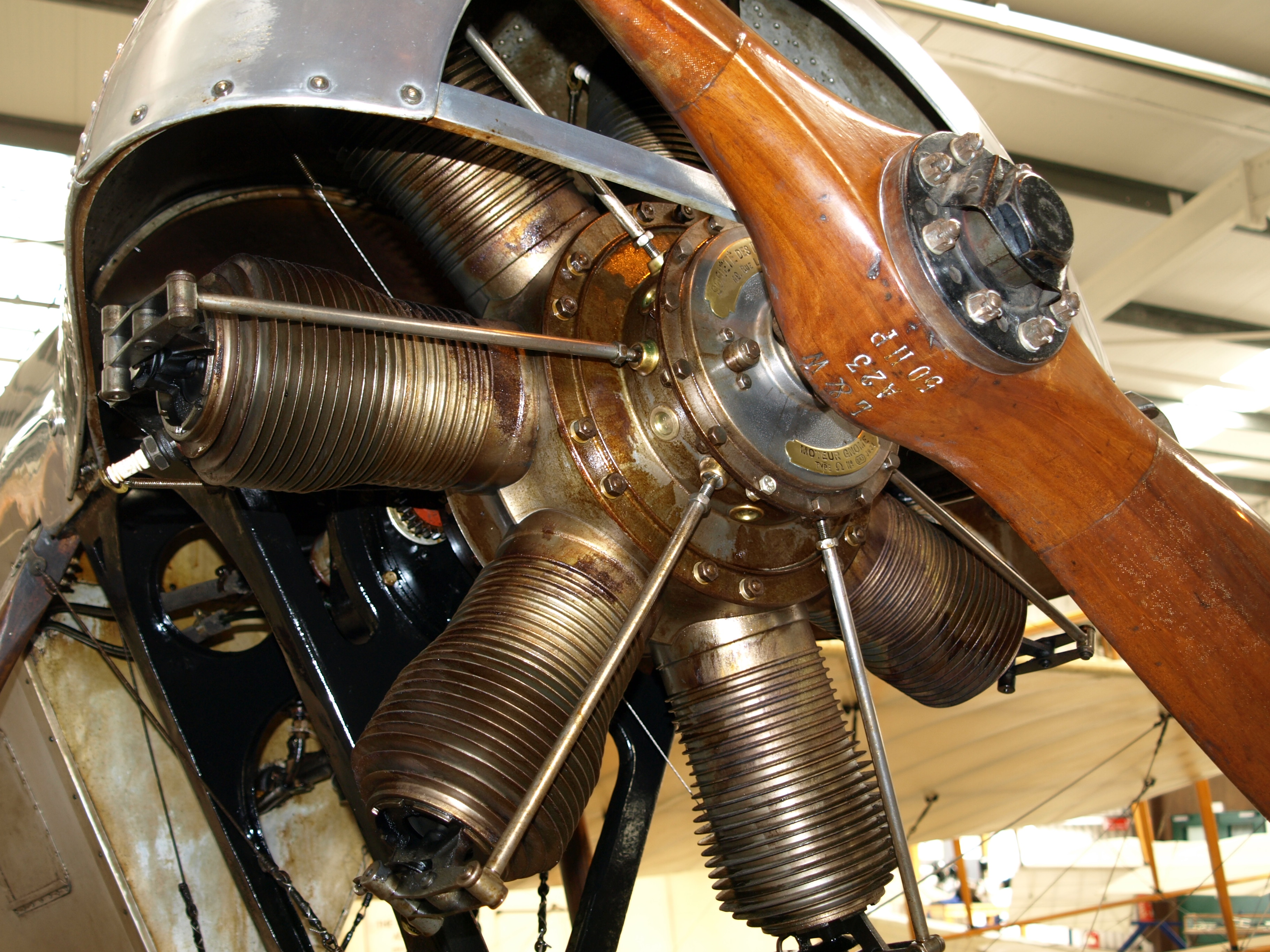
Brown staining of the Shuttleworth example caused by burnt castor oil

Data from Lumsden.

=== General characteristics ===
- Type: 7-cylinder, single-row, rotary engine
- Bore: 110 mm (4.3 in)
- Stroke: 120 mm (4.7 in)
- Displacement: 8 L (488.2 cu in)
- Length: 79 cm (31 in)
- Diameter: 84 cm (33 in)
- Dry weight: 75 kg (165 lb)

=== Components ===
- Valvetrain: pressure-driven inlet valves are located on the pistons
- Oil system: Total loss, castor oil
- Cooling system: Air-cooled
- Reduction gear: Direct drive, right-hand tractor, left-hand pusher

=== Performance ===
- Power output: 37 kW (50 hp) at 1,200 rpm

== See also ==
Comparable engines

- Clerget 7Z
- Le Rhône Type 7A
- Le Rhône Type 7B
- Le Rhône Type 7B2

Related lists

- List of aircraft engines

== Footnotes ==
=== References ===
- Hurley, Nick (2018). "Gnome 7 Omega". New England Air Museum. Archived from the original on August 18, 2018.
- Lumsden, Alec (2003). British Piston Engines and their Aircraft. Marlborough, Wiltshire, UK: Airlife Publishing. ISBN 1853102946.
- Murphy, Justin D. (2005). Military aircraft, origins to 1918: an illustrated history of their impact. Santa Barbara, Calif. [u.a.]: ABC-CLIO. pp. 32–33. ISBN 1-85109-488-1.
- Nahum, Andrew (1999). The rotary aero engine. London, UK: Science Museum. pp. 12–14. ISBN 1-900747-12-X.
- Schiere, J (1969) [1913]. "Aeroplanes & Dirigibles: Argentine". In Jane, Fred T. (ed.). Jane's All the World's Aircraft. Vol. 1913. New York, NY: Arco Publishing Company Inc. LCCN 69-14964.
- Smithsonian Institution (2018). "Gnome Omega No. 1 Rotary Engine". National Air and Space Museum. Washington, DC: Smithsonian Institution. Archived from the original on July 10, 2018.
- Shuttleworth (2018). "Blackburn Monoplane". Shuttleworth Collection. Archived from the original on August 19, 2018.
