= Roe II Triplane =

Early British aircraft

General information
- Type: Experimental aircraft
- Manufacturer: Avro
- Designer: Alliott Verdon Roe
- Number built: 2

History
- First flight: April 1910

The Roe II Triplane, sometimes known as the Mercury, was an early British aircraft and the first product of the Avro company. It was designed by Alliott Verdon Roe as a sturdier development of his wood-and-paper Roe I Triplane. Two examples were built, one as a display machine for Roe's new firm, and the second was sold to W. G. Windham. The longest recorded flight made by the Roe II Triplane was 600 ft (180 m).

== Specifications ==
Data from Jackson 1990 p.11

General characteristics

- Crew: one
- Length: 23 ft (7.0 m)
- Wingspan: 26 ft (7.9 m)
- Height: 9 ft (2.7 m)
- Wing area: 280 sq ft (26 m^{2})
- Gross weight: 550 lb (249 kg)
- Powerplant: × Green C.4 4-cylinder inline water-cooled, 35 hp (26 kW)
- Propellers: 2-bladed

Performance

- Maximum speed: 45 mph (72 km/h, 39 kn)

== See also ==
Related development Roe I Biplane-Roe I Triplane - Roe II Triplane - Roe III Triplane - Roe IV Triplane
