= Roe I Biplane =

British aeroplane

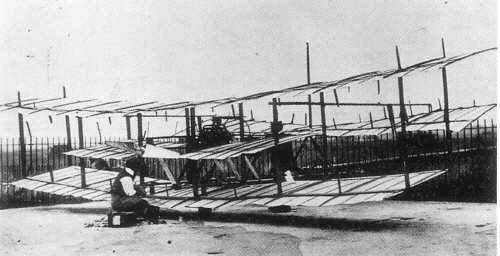

General information
- Type: Experimental aircraft
- Manufacturer: Alliott Verdon Roe
- Designer: Alliott Verdon Roe
- Number built: 1

History
- First flight: 8 June 1908

The Roe I Biplane (often later referred to as the Avro Biplane) was the first powered aircraft to be designed, built, and flown in England. Designed in an attempt to claim a prize offered by the Brooklands Automobile Racing Club, it was designed and built by Alliott Verdon Roe, who based it on a powered model with which he had won a Daily Mail prize of £75 at Alexandra Palace in April 1907. This prize was substantially larger: the club committee was offering £2,500 for the first person to fly a circuit of their three-mile (4.8 km) race track by the end of the year. In addition the Daily Graphic was offering a £1,000 prize for a flight of more than a mile (1.6 km).

The Roe biplane was built in the coachhouse of Roe's brother in Putney and transported to Brooklands for testing in September 1907. It was an unequal-span two-bay biplane without any vertical stabilising surface or rudder and was originally powered by a 9 hp (7 kW) JAP engine mounted in front of the wing and driving a two-bladed aluminium pusher propeller mounted behind the wings. This proved insufficiently powerful to get the craft airborne. Roe continued work on his aircraft, borrowing a French Antoinette engine of 24 hp (18 kW) to use instead. In order to carry the additional weight of this engine, Roe fitted additional lifting surfaces at mid-gap in the inner bay of the wing structure. With this motor, Roe was able to make several short flights in the aircraft; the first on 8 June 1908.

One of the conditions of Roe's occupation of his shed at Brooklands was that it was to be used as a refreshment room on race days and on the first of these the aircraft was damaged when being manhandled over a fence by Brooklands racetrack attendants. Roe repaired the machine and some further short flights were made before he was evicted from Brooklands on 17 July 1907. Roe dismantled the aircraft and returned the engine, since he could not afford to buy it.

In 1988, a non-flying replica was constructed for the 80th anniversary of Roe's first flight and is displayed at the Brooklands Museum. In 2008, a taxiable replica was constructed for the museum to celebrate the flight's centenary.

== Specifications (Antoinette engine) ==
Data from Jackson 1990 p.3

General characteristics

- Length: 23 ft (7.0 m)
- Upper wingspan: 36 ft (11 m)
- Lower wingspan: 30 ft (9.1 m)
- Empty weight: 350 lb (159 kg)
- Gross weight: 650 lb (295 kg)
- Powerplant: 1 × Antoinette 8V V-8 water cooled, 24 hp (18 kW)
- Propellers: 2-bladed, 6 ft 8 in (2.03 m) diameter

== See also ==
- I (Triplane)
- II Triplane
- III Triplane
- IV Triplane
