= A.V. Roe =

A.V. Roe may refer to:

- Alliott Verdon Roe, British aircraft pioneer and manufacturer
- A.V. Roe and Company (generally known as Avro), British aircraft manufacturer founded by Alliott Verdon Roe
  - A.V. Roe Canada (known as Avro Canada), Canadian subsidiary of Hawker Siddeley (the parent of Avro)
