= Roe I Triplane =

British aeroplane

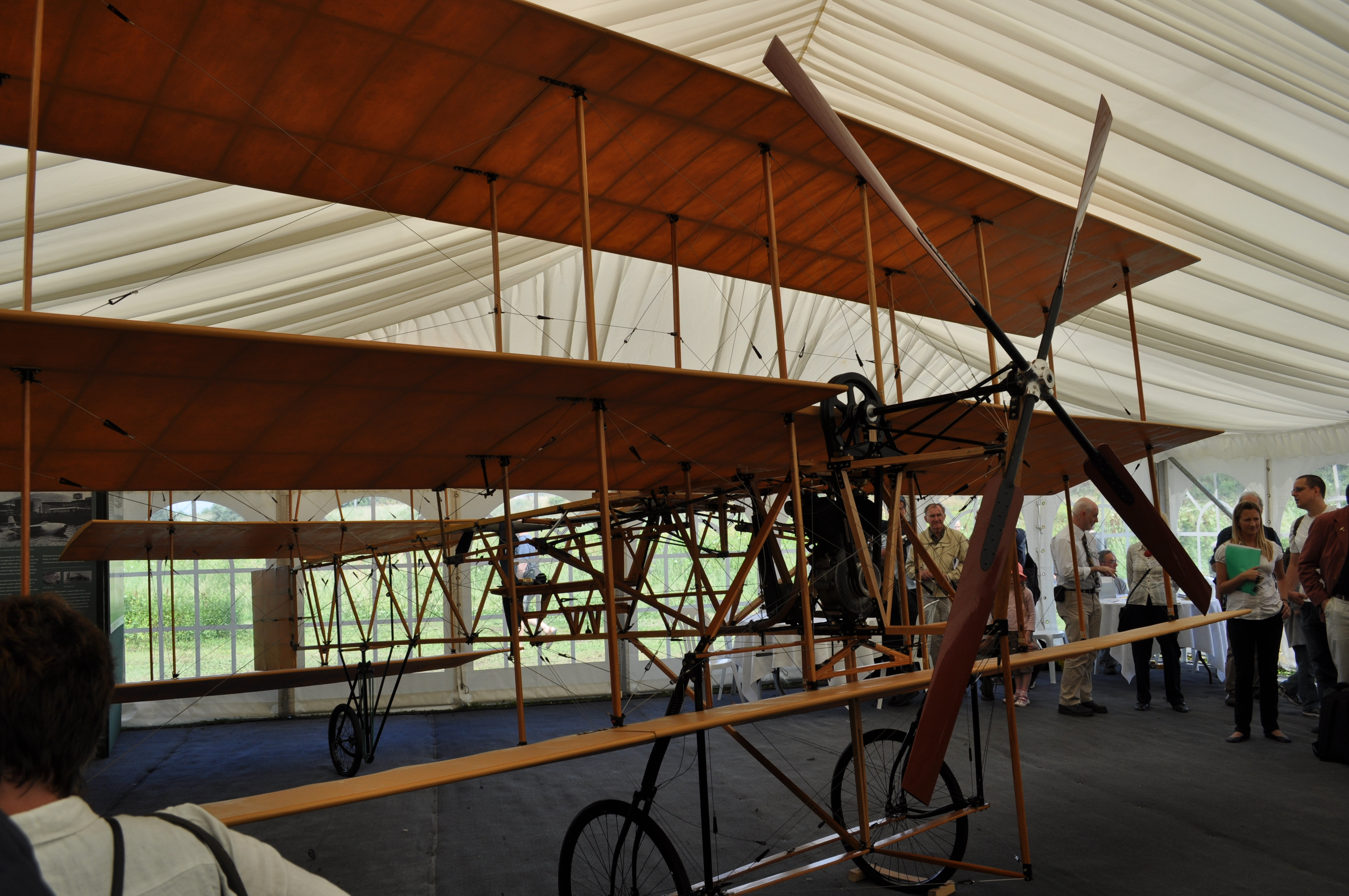
- A replica Roe I Triplane, at an event to commemorate the 100th anniversary of the all-British "first flight" on Walthamstow Marshes

General information
- Type: Experimental aircraft
- Manufacturer: Alliott Verdon Roe
- Designer: Alliott Verdon Roe
- Number built: 2

History
- First flight: 5 June 1909 (but sources differ as to which attempt should first be regarded as a "flight")

The Roe I Triplane (often later referred to as the Avro Triplane) was an early aircraft designed and built by A.V. Roe which was the first all-British aircraft to fly. (Roe's previous biplane had a French engine).

== Background ==
After being evicted from Brooklands, where he had worked on his first aircraft, Roe started work in July 1908 on the design of a triplane: a patent was filed for this design in January 1909, and work was started on the construction of an aircraft of this design in the stable adjoining the house of his brother, Dr Spencer Verdon Roe, in Putney in South-West London. It was then transported to the new flying ground that Roe had found on Walthamstow Marshes (then in Essex, but now within the London Borough of Waltham Forest), where he rented two railway arches under the LNER railway besides the river Lea.

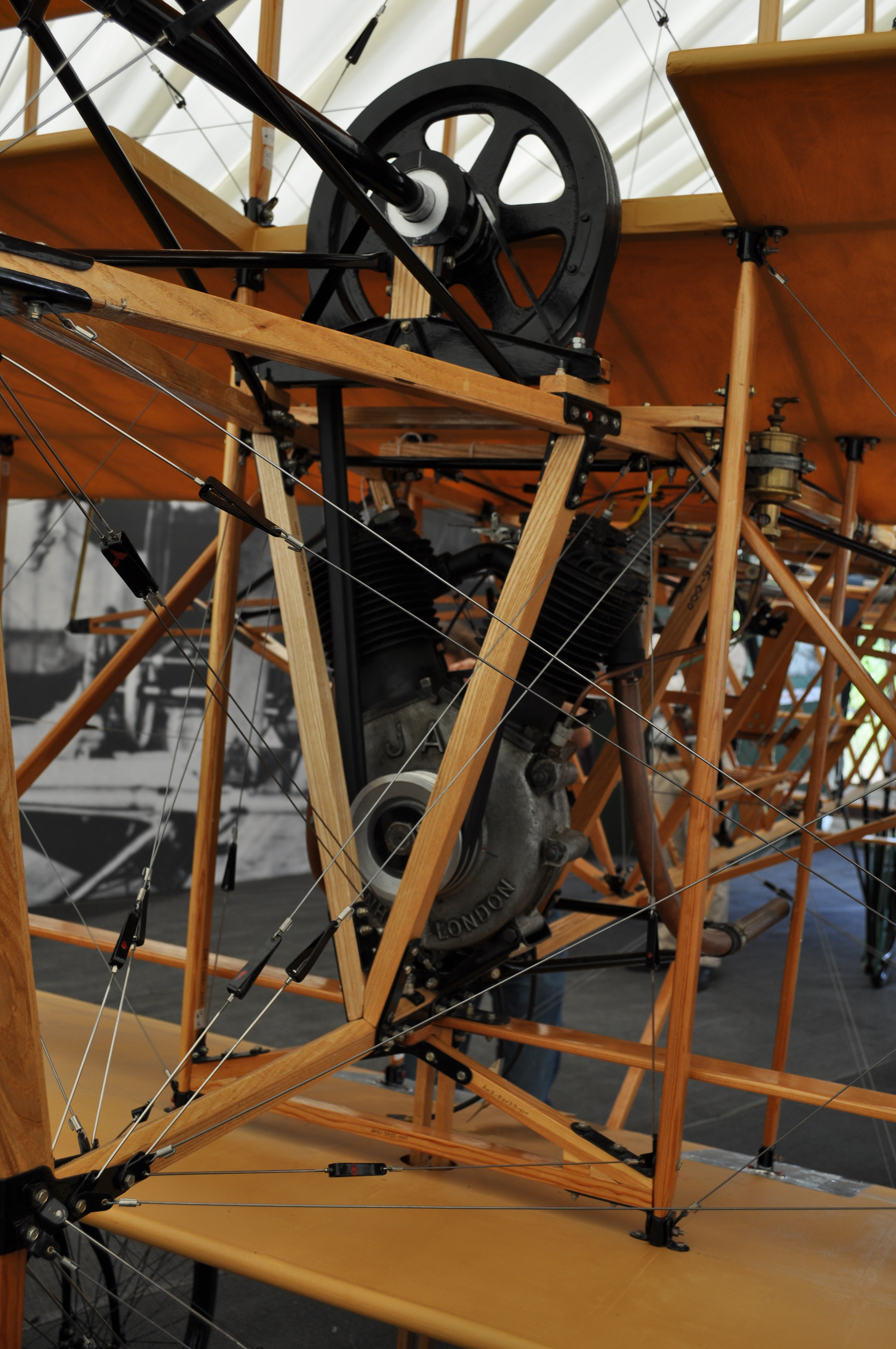
A replica 6 HP JAP motorcycle engine

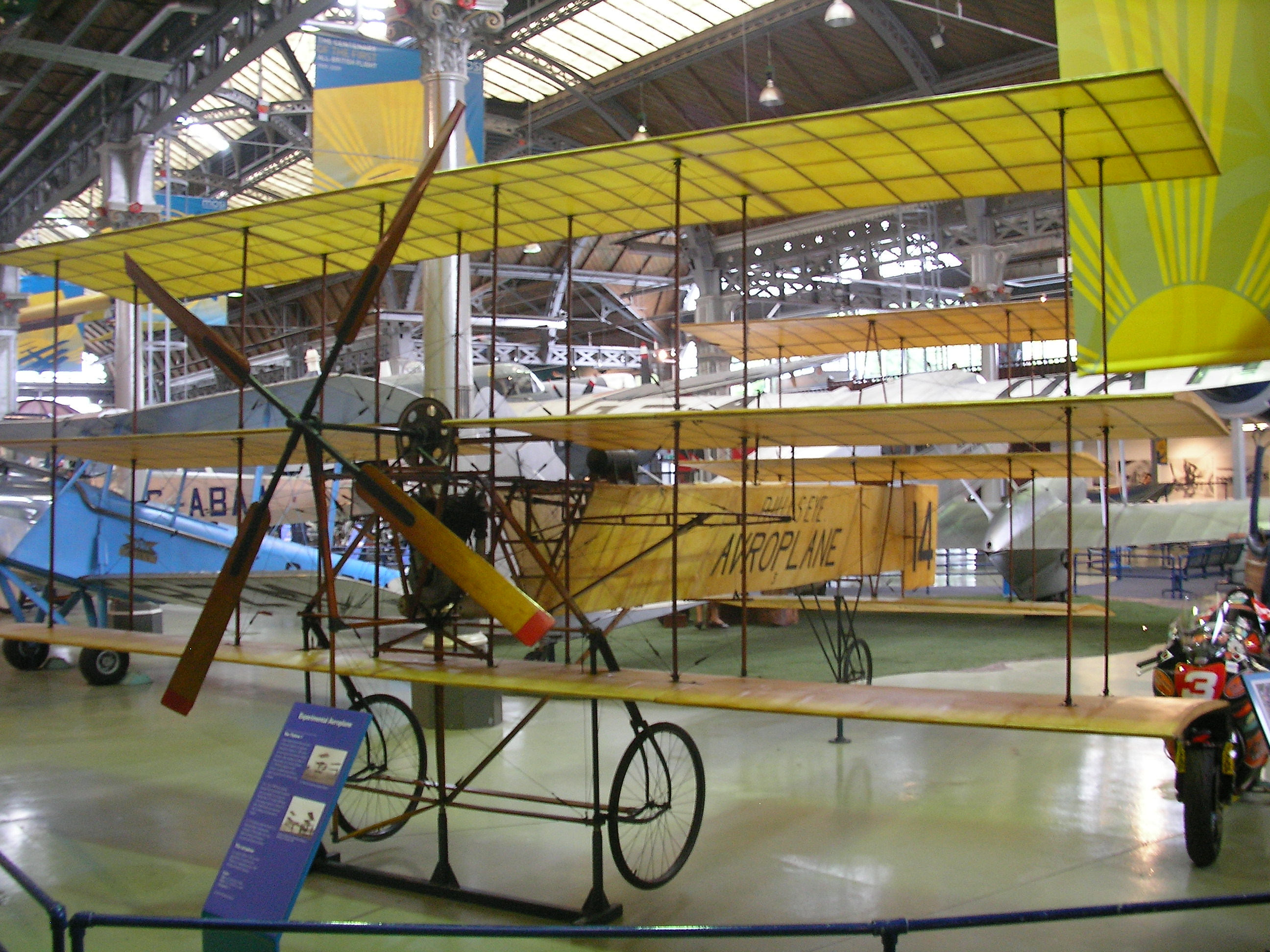
Replica in Museum of Science and Industry, Manchester

== Design and development ==
The Roe I Triplane was a two-bay triplane: the tailplane, with a span of 10 ft (3.0 m) also had three surfaces and was a lifting rather than a stabilising surface, making up around 33% of the total lifting area. Pitch control was affected by altering the angle of incidence of the mainplanes, and lateral control was by wing-warping. The control cables acted to warp the middle wing, the warping being transmitted to the top and bottom planes by the rear interplane struts. Directional control was affected by a rectangular rudder mounted behind the tailplane, and as first built, additional directional stability was provided by surfaces between the interplane struts of the tail assembly. The fuselage was a triangular section wire-braced wooden structure, with the middle wing and tailplane mounted on the upper longerons, and a gap between the lower planes and the lower longeron. The engine was mounted below the leading edge of the wing, with a belt drive to the propeller driveshaft which was mounted above the upper longerons. Both fuselage and wings were covered with brown paper backed by an open-weave fabric. Roe named the aircraft The Bullseye after the braces manufactured by his brother's firm, which had helped pay for it.

Roe had originally intended to use a four-cylinder inline engine which J.A. Prestwich (JAP) were developing but this failed when bench-tested by Prestwich, so Roe initially installed the 6 horsepower (hp) JAP engine from his previous aircraft. Taxying trials with this engine were begun in April 1909. At the end of May a new 9 hp (7 kW) JAP engine was delivered, and after fitting this a series of brief flights of around 50 ft (15 m) were made, beginning on 5 June. During these flights Roe experimented with different reduction ratios between the engine and propeller and also with varying pitch settings for the propeller blades, which could be adjusted between flights. On 13 July, he achieved a flight of 100 ft (30 m), and ten days later one of 900 ft (270 m). Over the next two months further successful flights were made and the aircraft was modified slightly: the drive belt was replaced by a chain, the vertical tail surfaces were removed and both the engine and pilot's seat were moved forwards.

Roe took the prototype and a second aircraft, differing in having a slightly tapered fuselage and a tailskid in place of a tailwheel, to the Blackpool Aero Meeting held at the end of October 1909. Some short flights were made using the first machine. The engine for the second, a four-cylinder JAP intended to produce 20 hp (15 kW), arrived only halfway through the event and although the engine was fitted poor weather prevented it being flown. The flights made at Blackpool were the last made by the prototype: it was subsequently exhibited at an exhibition held in Manchester in 1914 and was later presented to the Science Museum in London.

By this time Roe had been evicted from the railway arches in Walthamstow: he resumed his flying activities at Wembley, where the second example was first flown on 6 December. It was damaged in a crash on 24 December. In January 1910 Roe formed the firm of A.V. Roe and Company with the assistance of his brother Humphrey, and workshop space was provided in the factory of Humphrey's company, Everard and Co, at Brownfield Mills, Manchester. Flying operations were transferred to Brooklands, where the aircraft was flown on 11 March 1910. By now Roe's interest was focused on his next aircraft, the Roe II Triplane, which was at that time on display at the second Aero Show at Olympia. The Roe I was briefly used for experiments with the outer sections of the lower wing removed and longer outer sections fitted to the upper wings, this configuration being known as the "two and a bit plane". This was flown at Brooklands during the Aero Meeting on Easter Monday 1910, but the experiment was not pursued and the machine was dismantled at Brooklands shortly afterwards.

On 12 July 2009, an event was held, under the auspices of the Royal Aeronautical Society, on Walthamstow Marshes, to commemorate the first all-British flight; several generations of Roe's family were in attendance. A new historic marker was unveiled on the northern entrance to Roe's former workshops in the railway arches.

== Aircraft on display ==
- The first example is preserved at the Science Museum in London.
- The Museum of Science and Industry in Manchester has a full-scale replica on display, made by apprentices in 1952 to resemble it as it appeared in 1909 at the Blackpool Aviation Meeting.

== Specifications (First example) ==
Data from Jackson 1990

General characteristics

- Crew: one
- Length: 23 ft (7.0 m)
- Wingspan: 20 ft (6.1 m)
- Height: 9 ft (2.7 m)
- Wing area: 320 sq ft (30 m^{2})

Total lifting area (wings and tail). Jackson's figure is 285 ft^{2}, with the tail area given as 35 ft^{2}, which does not make sense given the relative sizes of the wing and tail surfaces.

- Empty weight: 300 lb (136 kg)
- Gross weight: 450 lb (204 kg)
- Powerplant: 1 × JAP V-twin configuration air-cooled., 9 hp (6.7 kW)
- Propellers: 4-bladed

Performance

- Maximum speed: 25 mph (40 km/h, 22 kn)
- Range: 0.30 mi (0.50 km, 0.26 nmi)

== See also ==
Related development

- Roe I Biplane
- Roe II Triplane
- Roe III Triplane
- Roe IV Triplane
