= Caproni Ca.1 =

Caproni Ca.1 may refer to:

- Caproni Ca.1 (1910), a pioneering biplane of 1910
- Caproni Ca.1 (1914), a bomber of the First World War also designated the Ca.30
