= 1910 in aviation =

This is a list of aviation-related events from 1910:

== Events ==
- Races between aeroplanes and cars are won only by racing cars.
- The world's first use of a radio between an aircraft and the ground takes place in the United States.
- Hugo Junkers gets a patent for his thick wing/all-metal type aeroplane.
- A patent is taken out in Germany for a device that allows a fixed machine gun to be fired from an airplane.
- The Imperial German Navy begins to form an air arm.
- The Imperial Russian Navy orders its first airplane.
- Lilian Bland builds and flies her own glider, the first biplane built in Ireland, from Carnmoney Hill, soon afterwards fitting an engine and making her first powered flight in late August.
- Pierre Levasseur founds Société Pierre Levasseur Aéronautique, which initially manufactures propellers.

=== January–March ===
- January – Missiles are dropped from an airplane for the first time, when United States Army Lieutenant Paul W. Beck drops sandbags simulating bombs over Los Angeles, California.
- 4 January – Leon Delagrange is killed in Bordeaux after the wings on his Blériot collapse.
- 7 January
  - Frenchman Hubert Latham is the first pilot to climb to 1,000 metres (3,281 feet).
  - The first aircraft designed entirely on Brazilian soil is built by Dimitri Sensaud de Lavaud, an engineer, inventor and aviator of French descent, born in Spain and a naturalized Brazilian living in Brazil. The airplane, baptized as São Paulo, flies in Osasco in the state of São Paulo. The flight takes place in front of a group of onlookers and journalists where today's Avenida João Batista is located. It is also the first to take off in Latin America.
- 8 January – The Mexican aviator Alberto Braniff flies around Mexico City in a Voisin monoplane imported from France. It is the first flight made by a Latin American aviator in Latin America.
- 10–20 January – The first aviation meet in the United States, the 1910 Los Angeles International Air Meet at Dominguez Field, take place near Los Angeles, California.
- 8 February – Louis Paulhan makes the first confirmed flight in New Orleans, Louisiana as part of the Mardi Gras celebrations there.
- 15 February - In the United Kingdom, the Royal Aero Club is granted its "Royal" prefix.
- 25 February - Crew training begins for the British Royal Navy's first rigid airship, HMA No. 1, also known as Mayfly.
- March – The Imperial Russian Navy sends three officers to France to receive flight training. It is the beginning of Russian heavier-than-air naval aviation.
- 7 March – English aviator Claude Grahame-White lands his biplane on West Executive Avenue in Washington, D.C. and then lunches with United States Secretary of War Jacob M. Dickinson.
- 8 March – Raymonde de Laroche of France becomes the first woman in the world to receive a pilot's licence.
- 10 March – Emil Aubrun (fr) makes the first night flights, in a Blériot XI at Villalugano, Argentina.
- 11 March – J. W. Dunne flies one of the first inherently stable aircraft, the Dunne D.5, at Eastchurch.
- 13 March – Paul Engelhard (de) makes the first flight in Switzerland, flying a Wright biplane from a frozen lake at St Moritz
- 14 March – Louis Paulhan flies 146 km (91 mi) in a straight route from Orleans to Troyes.
- 21 March – Harry Houdini achieves one of the first powered flights in Australia.
- 28 March – Henri Fabre makes the first flights in a seaplane, the Fabre Hydravion, at Martigues, France.

=== April–June ===
- April – The French Aéronautique Militaire is formed as its own command, with a total of five aircraft.
- 2 April – Hubert Le Blon, an early Bleriot XI pilot, is killed after crashing onto the rocks at San Sebastian, Spain. He is the second pilot to die in the crash of a Bleriot after Delagrange.
- 28 April – Frenchman Louis Paulhan completes the Daily Mail's London to Manchester challenge in under 24 hours; the other competitor, Claude Grahame-White, is forced to retire.
- 10 May – Ernest Failloubaz makes the first flight in Switzerland by an aircraft built by and flown by a Swiss citizen. The aircraft has been constructed in co-operation with René Grandjean.
- 13 May – Gabriel Hauvette-Michelin, an Antoinette pilot, is killed after hitting a racing pylon during takeoff at Lyon. The pylon breaks and falls over, crushing him in his cockpit.
- 18 May – The world's first conference on air traffic, the International Air Navigation Conference, opens in Paris, France.

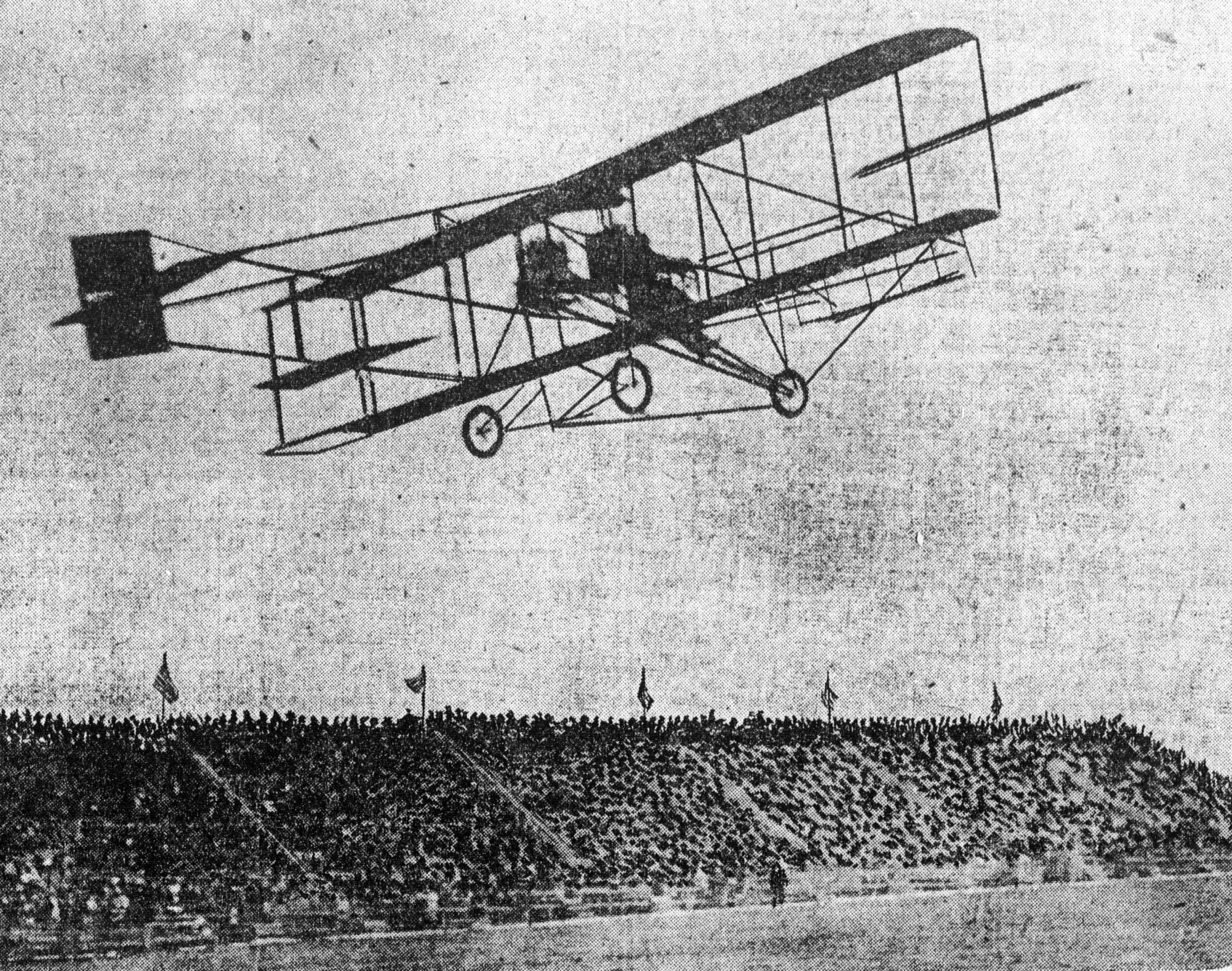
A Curtiss machine in 1910

- 27 May – The Caproni Ca.1, the first aircraft manufactured entirely in Italy, is destroyed during its first flight.
- 31 May – Glenn Curtiss wins a US$10,000 prize from the New York World for flying in his Hudson Flyer from Albany, New York, to New York City in 2 hours 51 minutes, following the course of the Hudson River.
- 2 June – Charles Rolls makes the first successful return (or round-trip) flight across the English Channel.
- 6 June – The first air race between two cities takes place, a 43-kilometre (27 mi) race in France between Angers and Saumur with over 200,000 spectators looking on. Of seven competitors, only three manage to take off. Robert Martinet wins in a Farman biplane with a time of 31 minutes 35 seconds.
- 17 June – Romanian engineer and inventor Aurel Vlaicu flies his first airplane, Vlaicu I
- 22 June – The first commercial airship flight takes place, as the Zeppelin Deutschland (LZ 7) flies from Friederichshafen to Düsseldorf, Germany, with 20 paying passengers – 10 men and 10 women – on board. Count Ferdinand von Zeppelin is at Deutschland's helm.

=== July–September ===
- July – The United States Navy torpedo boat Bagley becomes the first U.S. Navy ship to embark a heavier-than-air aircraft when she takes a flying machine invented by Butler Ames aboard for testing. Tests carried out aboard Bagley of the Butler Ames Flying Machine last until August. The flying machine, which relies on the rotation of two large drums for its lifting power, proves incapable of flight.
- 9 July – Frenchman Léon Morane (fr) sets a new speed record of 106 km/h (66 mph).
- 12 July – The French-built Wright airplane of Charles Rolls suffers a broken rudder at an altitude of 80 feet (24 meters) and crashes during a contest at Bournemouth. Rolls dies in the crash, becoming the first British aviation fatality.
- 13 July – The German blimp Erbslöh suffers an in-flight explosion and crashes near Leverkusen, Germany, killing her entire crew of five.
- 6–13 August – First Scottish International Aviation Meeting held at Lanark.
- 18 August – John Moissant becomes the first American to pilot an airplane across the English Channel.
- 20 August – A military firearm is fired from an airplane for the first time when United States Army Lieutenant Jacob Earl Fickel fires a rifle from a two-seat Curtiss biplane.
- 27 August – Frederick "Casey" Baldwin and John McCurdy, using a Curtiss biplane, are the first pilots to send radio messages to the ground.
- 28 August – Armand Dufaux pilots a Dufaux 4 biplane 66 km (41 mi) from St. Gingolph to Geneva at an altitude of around 150 m (490 ft), taking 56 minutes and 5 seconds for the crossing of Lake Geneva, the longest flight over "open water" at the time.
- 29 August – The Aero Club of Ireland holds its inaugural aviation meeting at Leopardstown Racecourse.
- August – First passenger flight in Ulster: Harry Ferguson pilots Miss Rita Marr.
- 6 September – Blanche Stuart Scott makes the first solo airplane flight by a woman in the United States subsequently recognized by the Early Birds of Aviation.
- 6 September – The Peruvian Jorge Chávez (Geo Chavez) flies at 2,700 meters (8,700 ft) over the city of Issy, France.
- 11 September – English-born actor-aviator Robert Loraine makes the first aeroplane flight from Wales across the Irish Sea, although he actually lands some 200 feet (61 metres) short of the Irish coast in Dublin Bay.
- 14 September – The Zeppelin LZ 6 is destroyed by fire in her hangar at Baden-Baden, Germany.
- 16 September – Bessica Raiche makes the first solo airplane flight by a woman in the United States to be accredited at the time by the Aeronautical Society of America.
- 17 September – Andrew Blain Baird makes the first powered monoplane flight in Scotland, at Ettrick Bay on the Isle of Bute in a self-built machine.
- 23 September – Geo Chavez flies the Blériot monoplane over the Alps from Brig (Switzerland) to Domodossola (Italy) reaching a height of 2,200 metres (7,200 feet), but is fatally injured in a crash landing at the end of his flight and dies four days later.
- 25 September - Edmond Poillot is killed flying a Voisin biplane.
- 26 September - Captain Washington I. Chambers is designated as the first officer to have oversight over United States Navy aviation programs.
- 27 or 28 September – Aurel Vlaicu carries out the first military flight mission in Romania, delivering a message from Slatina to Piatra-Olt.

=== October–December ===
- October – Romanian inventor Henri Coandă builds the Coandă-1910 which he exhibits at the International Aeronautic Salon in Paris. He later claims that this is the first motorjet, and that two months later it is flown briefly at the airport in Issy-les-Moulineaux. Most aviation historians assert that the aircraft never flew and was not a motorjet.
- 3 October – The first mid-air collision takes place near Milan. Both pilots, Bertram Dickson and René Thomas, survive, but Dickson is badly injured.
- 11 October – Theodore Roosevelt, President of the United States from 1901 to 1909, becomes the first former American president to fly in an airplane when he flies with exhibition pilot Arch Hoxsey at St. Louis, Missouri. (Former Italian Prime Minister Sidney Sonnino had become the first former state leader of any country to fly in an airplane when he flew with Wilbur Wright at Centocelle near Rome, Italy, in 1909.)
- 14 October – Carl Cederström makes the first confirmed flight over Norway.
- 15 October – Walter Wellman and his crew of five (including aeronaut and aerial photographer Melvin Vaniman) depart Atlantic City, New Jersey, in the dirigible America to attempt the first transatlantic flight.
- 16 October – During a six-hour, 390 km (240 mi), non-stop flight from Compiègne, France, to Wormwood Scrubs, London, England, the French military dirigible Clément-Bayard No.2, piloted by Maurice Clément and carrying six other men, becomes the first airship to cross the English Channel. The overwater portion of the flight takes 45 minutes.
- 18 October – Wellman's transatlantic attempt ends when mechanical failures and a shortage of fuel force his dirigible America down in the North Atlantic Ocean about 450 miles (720 km) east of Cape Hatteras, North Carolina, where all aboard are rescued by the ocean liner Trent. Despite America″s failure to cross the Atlantic, the flight has set new world records for nonstop distance flown 1,008 miles (1,622 km) and for endurance (71½ hours nonstop, smashing the previous record, also set by a dirgible, of 37 hours aloft, at time when the airplane record was 5 hours).
- 24 October – Blanche Stuart Scott becomes the first American female stunt pilot and the first American woman to pilot an aircraft at a public event, making her debut at an air show at Fort Wayne, Indiana.
- 4 November – Welshman Ernest Willows makes the first airship crossing from England to France with Willows No. 3 City of Cardiff.
- 7 November
  - Pilot Didier Masson takes flight on a biplane designed by E. Lilian Todd across the Garden City aviation field at Garden City, New York. Todd is credited as the first woman to design airplanes.
  - The first air flight for the purpose of delivering commercial freight occurs between Dayton, Ohio, and Columbus, Ohio, in the United States by the Wright Brothers and department store owner Max Moorehouse. The trip is made by Wright pilot Philip Parmalee.
- 14 November – Eugene Ely takes off from a temporary platform erected over the bow of the light cruiser USS Birmingham in Hampton Roads, Virginia, the first take-off from a ship by a fixed-wing aircraft.
- 17 November – Ralph Johnstone, a pilot for the Wright Exhibition Team, becomes the first American pilot to die in a plane crash when his machine breaks apart in mid-air in full view of about 5,000 spectators at Denver, Colorado.
- 1 December – The Curtiss Aeroplane Company is founded.
- 3 December – The first multiple-fatality airplane accident in history takes places, when Italian Army Lieutenant Enrico Cammarota and Private S. Castellani become the 26th and 27th people to die in a plane crash in a mishap at Aeroporto di Centocelle, near Rome, Italy.
- 9 December – The French aviator Georges Legagneux becomes the first person to fly an airplane higher than 10,000 feet (3,048 meters), reaching an altitude of 10,499 feet (3,200 meters) in a Blériot XI monoplane over the airfield at Pau near Paris.
- 16 December – Coandă-1910, the first aircraft powered by a turbo-propulseur, may have been tested near Paris. Another date given in some sources is 10 December. Experts dispute whether it was tested at all.

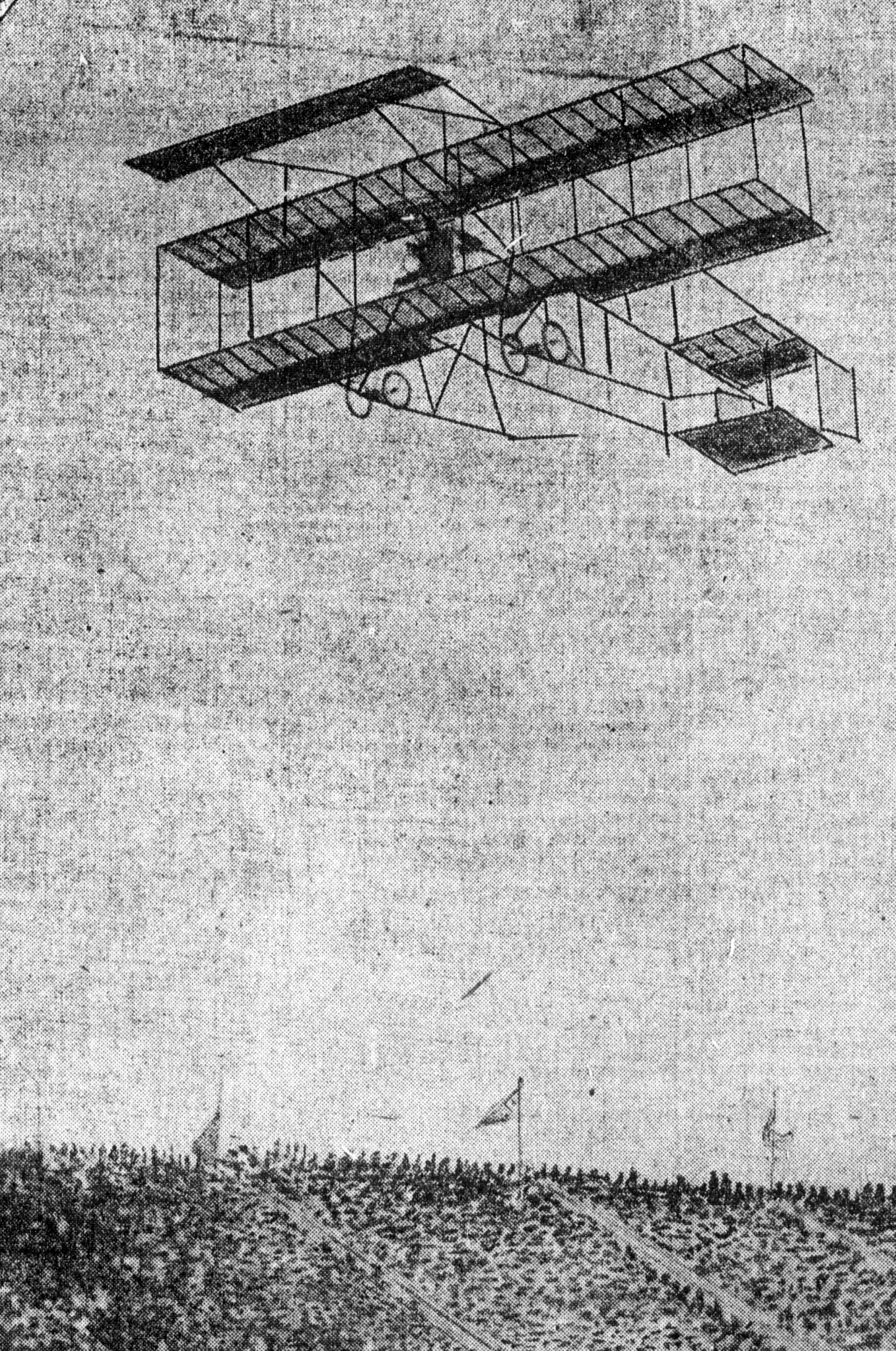
A Farman III flying in 1910

- 19 December – Imperial Japanese Army Captain Yoshitoshi Tokugawa makes the first heavier-than-air flight in Japan piloting a Farman III biplane.
- 20 December – Chile establishes its first military aviation arm, the Chilean Army's Military Aviation Service of Chile.
- 21 December
  - Hélène Dutrieu becomes the first winner of the Coupe Femina (Femina Cup) for a non-stop flight of 167 kilometers (104 mi) in 2 hours 35 minutes.
  - Georges Legagneux sets a new world nonstop distance record with a flight of 515.5 kilometres (320.3 mi).
- 22 December – British aviation pioneer Cecil Grace vanishes over the English Channel during a flight from Calais, France, to Dover, England.
- 23 December – Lieutenant Theodore Ellyson of the United States Navy is assigned to flight training with the Curtiss company, making him the first U.S. naval aviator.
- 28 December – French aviator Alexandre Laffont and Spanish passenger Mario Pola are killed at Issy-Les-Molineaux shortly after taking off in an attempt to fly to Belgium with two passengers. Their Antoinette monoplane collapses in midair. Pola was the owner of the aircraft and had hired test pilot Laffont, of the Antoinette Company, to fly it.
- 30 December – French aviator Maurice Tabuteau sets a new world nonstop distance record, flying 584.745 kilometres (363.344 mi) in a Farman MF.7 biplane at Buc, France, in 7 hours 48 minutes 36.6 seconds. The flight will win him the 1910 International Michelin Cup for the longest nonstop distance flown during 1910.
- 31 December – American pioneers John B. Moisant and Arch Hoxsey are killed on this day within hours of each other. Moisant at New Orleans in the morning and Hoxsey at Los Angeles in the afternoon.

== First flights ==
- Caudron Type A
- Short S.27

=== April ===
- Roe II Triplane

=== May ===
- 27 May – Caproni Ca.1, first aircraft manufactured entirely in Italy

=== June ===
- 24 June – Roe III Triplane

=== July ===
- 29 July – Bristol Boxkite

=== September ===
- De Havilland Biplane No. 2
- Roe IV Triplane

=== November ===
- Martin-Handasyde No. 3 monoplane (from Brooklands)
