= Volandia =

- Volandia – Parco e museo del volo
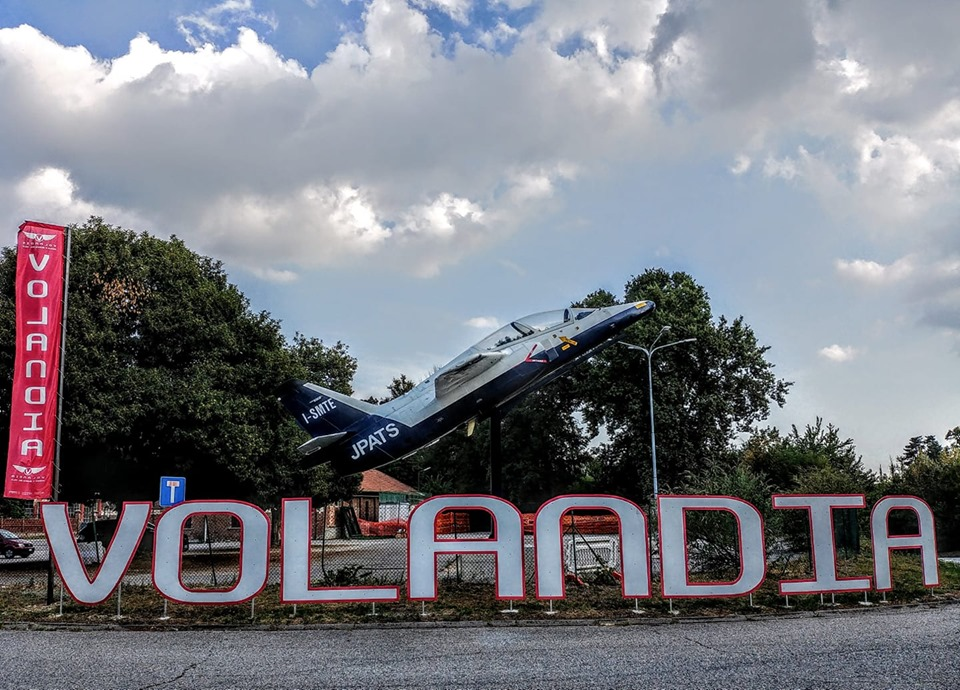

- Location within Italy
- Established: 2010
- Location: Via per Tornavento, 15, Case Nuove 21019 Somma Lombardo (VA), Italy
- Coordinates: 45.630080°N 8.706800°E
- Type: Aviation museum
- Collection size: 100 aircraft, plus cars, motorbikes, scale models and historically significant artifacts
- Parking: On site (no charge)
- Website: Official website

Volandia Park and Flight Museum is the largest Italian aeronautical museum, as well as one of the largest in Europe. Volandia displays over 100 aircraft. The museum covers an area of ca. 60,000 m^{2} (645,000 sq ft) of which 20,000 m^{2} (215,000 sq ft) are indoors. It opened in 2010, after a 10-year preparation phase.

The museum is located immediately adjacent to Milan-Malpensa Airport within the historic buildings of the Caproni Vizzola plant, dating from 1913.

Since its foundation in 2010, the park-museum has been enriched with numerous collections, including the Luciano Piazzai Modeling Collection, and the Flaminio Bertoni Museum; it also houses the Gruppo Bertone Collection, which brings together some of the most famous cars designed by the Turin car body shop.

The complex is located within the Ticino Park.

== History ==
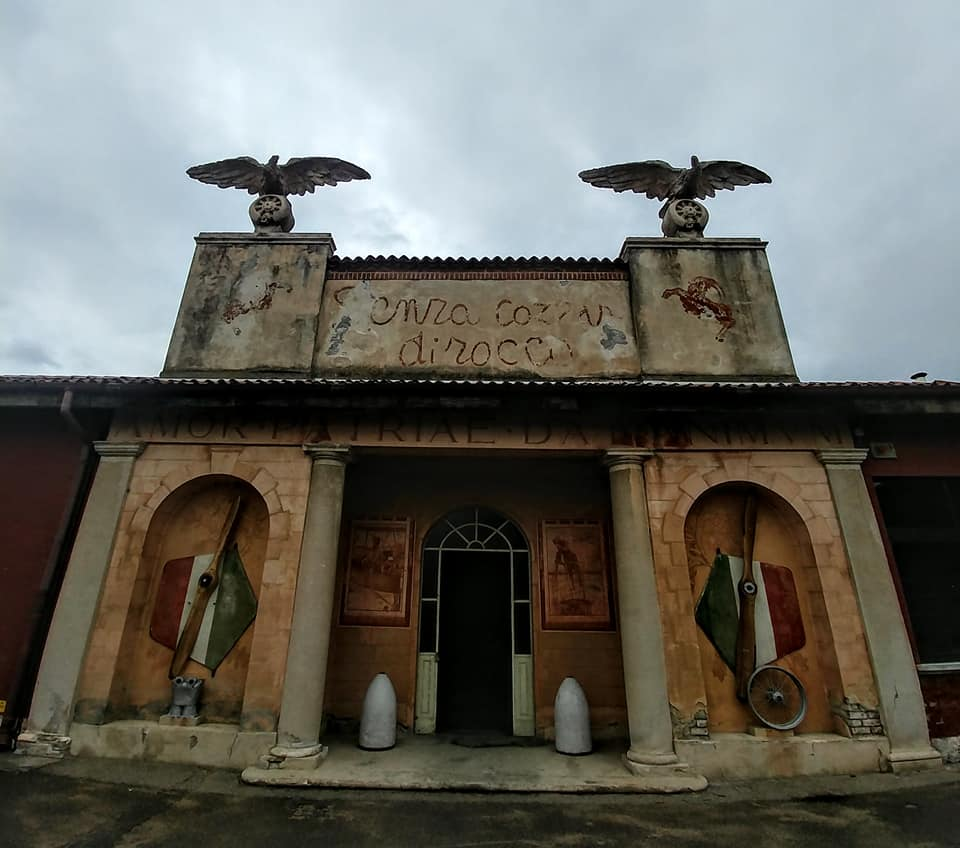
Caproni's Chapel in the museum

During a conference held at the Castello Visconti in San Vito, in Somma Lombardo, on 11 November 2006, a project was launched for the establishment of a large aeronautical museum to be built at the former Officine Caproni in Vizzola Ticino (VA ). This museum should have retraced the aeronautical history of Lombard industries, such as Caproni, SIAI-Marchetti from Sesto Calende, Aermacchi, Agusta, and Piero Magni, and of the province of Varese. The chosen site was located near the Milan-Malpensa airport, and was easily accessible from Milan. Numerous local political leaders joined the initiative, such as the president of the province of Varese Marco Reguzzoni, the President of the Regional Council of Lombardy Alberoni, numerous mayors, and aeronautics industry managers such as Carmelo Cosentino (CEO of Alenia Aermacchi) and Giuseppe Orsi (CEO of Agusta Westland), the president of the Aero Club of Italy Giuseppe Leoni, and the Italian Air Force.

Fondazione Museo dell'Aeronautica was set up, of which Reguzzoni became president, who provided to buy at a favorable price from AgustaWestland the area of the former Officine Caproni, including warehouses and offices. The realization was carried out with a commitment signed by the Lombardy Region, the province of Varese, and the mayors of the municipalities of Cardano al Campo, Ferno, Lonate Pozzolo, Gallarate, Samarate, Somma Lombardo, Varese and Vizzola Ticino, and 19 million euros were made available, to be paid out progressively for the restoration of the buildings, the fitting out and the endowment of the exhibition spaces.

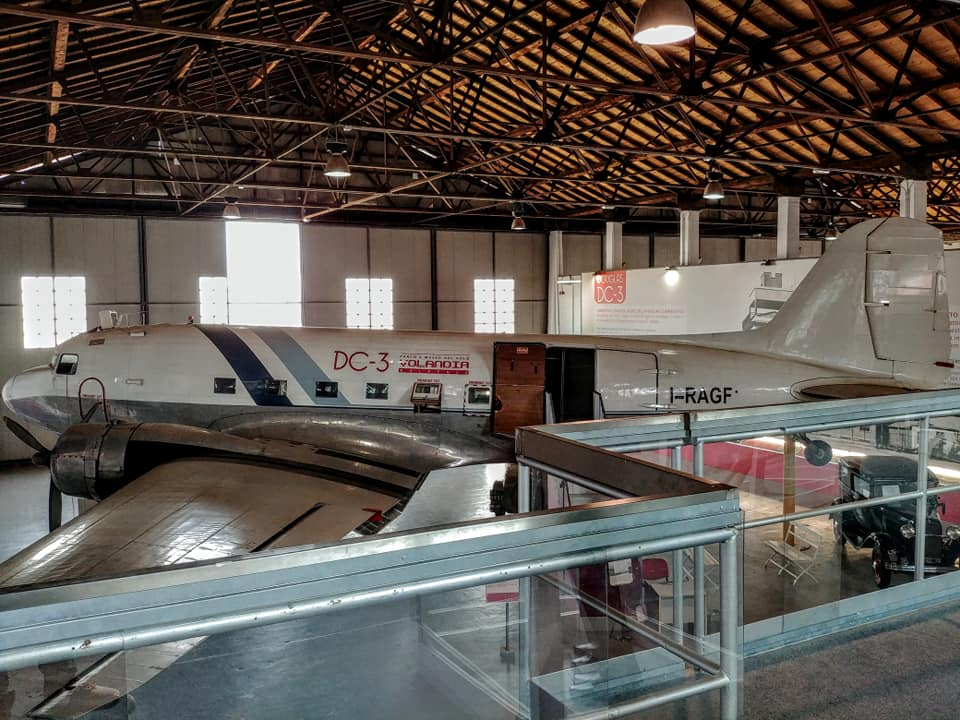
Douglas DC-3 Dakota

The Volandia Park and Museum was officially opened to the public on 8 May 2010. Already in its first year, Volandia could count on a museum heritage of over 30 aircraft and a thousand models on display. In 2012, following the acquisition of several models, including the American twin-engine Douglas DC-3, a new 4000 m^{2} exhibition area dedicated to commercial aviation was inaugurated. The Douglas DC-3 by Volandia is the only functioning specimen exhibited in Italy.

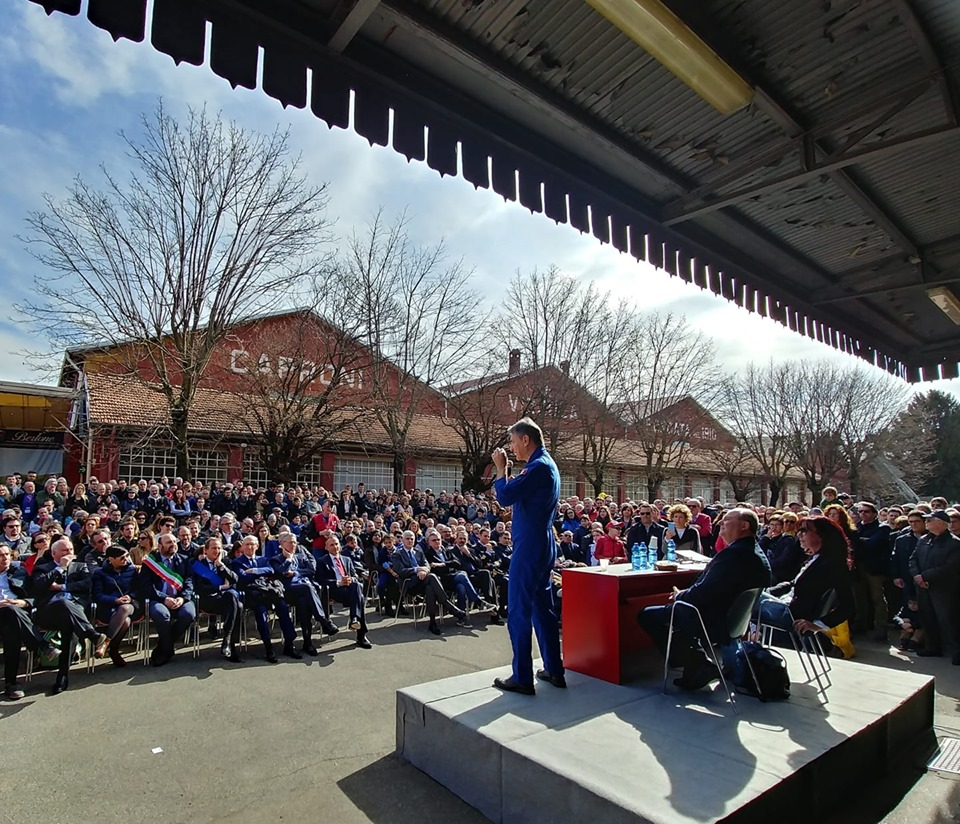
Paolo Nespoli presents the new pavilion of Astronomy and Space

From 2018 the museum also houses the Bertone collection, a patrimony composed of 76 cars and including vehicles of great importance such as the Lamborghini Miura, Espada and Countach, a road Lancia Stratos, an Alfa Romeo Giulia SS, a Giulia Sprint, a Montreal and numerous prototypes designed at Stile Bertone. The cars of the Turin body shop are added to the works of art, cars and sketches of Flaminio Bertoni, another famous Italian designer and artist.

On 8 April 2017, in the presence of the former football players Claudio Gentile and Pietro Vierchowod, the presidential Douglas DC-9 was inaugurated, an airplane that carried numerous Heads of State and Government, including the President of the Republic Sandro Pertini and Pope John Paul II, and twin of the one who brought the Azzurri home after the victorious World Cup. In 2018 the MD-80 I-SMEL, the first MD-80 of the Meridiana fleet, was donated to the museum park.

In 2019, on the occasion of the 50th anniversary of the first Moon landing, Volandia presented, with the participation of astronaut Paolo Nespoli, the new pavilion of Astronomy and Space. During "Linate Air Show", Volandia has also exposed a Yakovlev Yak-40 completely restored.

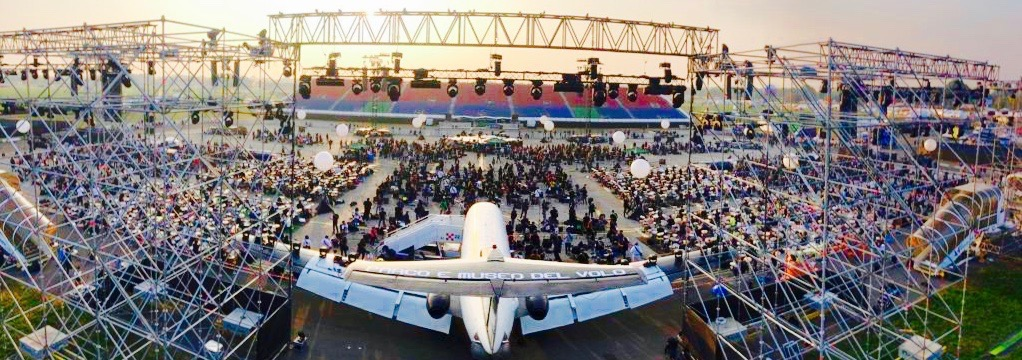
Yakovlev Yak-40 at Linate Air Show, 2019

On January 25, 2020, a Lockheed F-104 Starfighter arrived at Volandia. The aircraft, from the Luftwaffenmuseum in Berlin, was officially inaugurated on February 8, 2020. From July 4, 2020, the second prototype of the Aermacchi M-346 trainer is also kept in Volandia. Before the exhibition, the aircraft will remain inside the Volandia workshop until the assembly operations are completed.

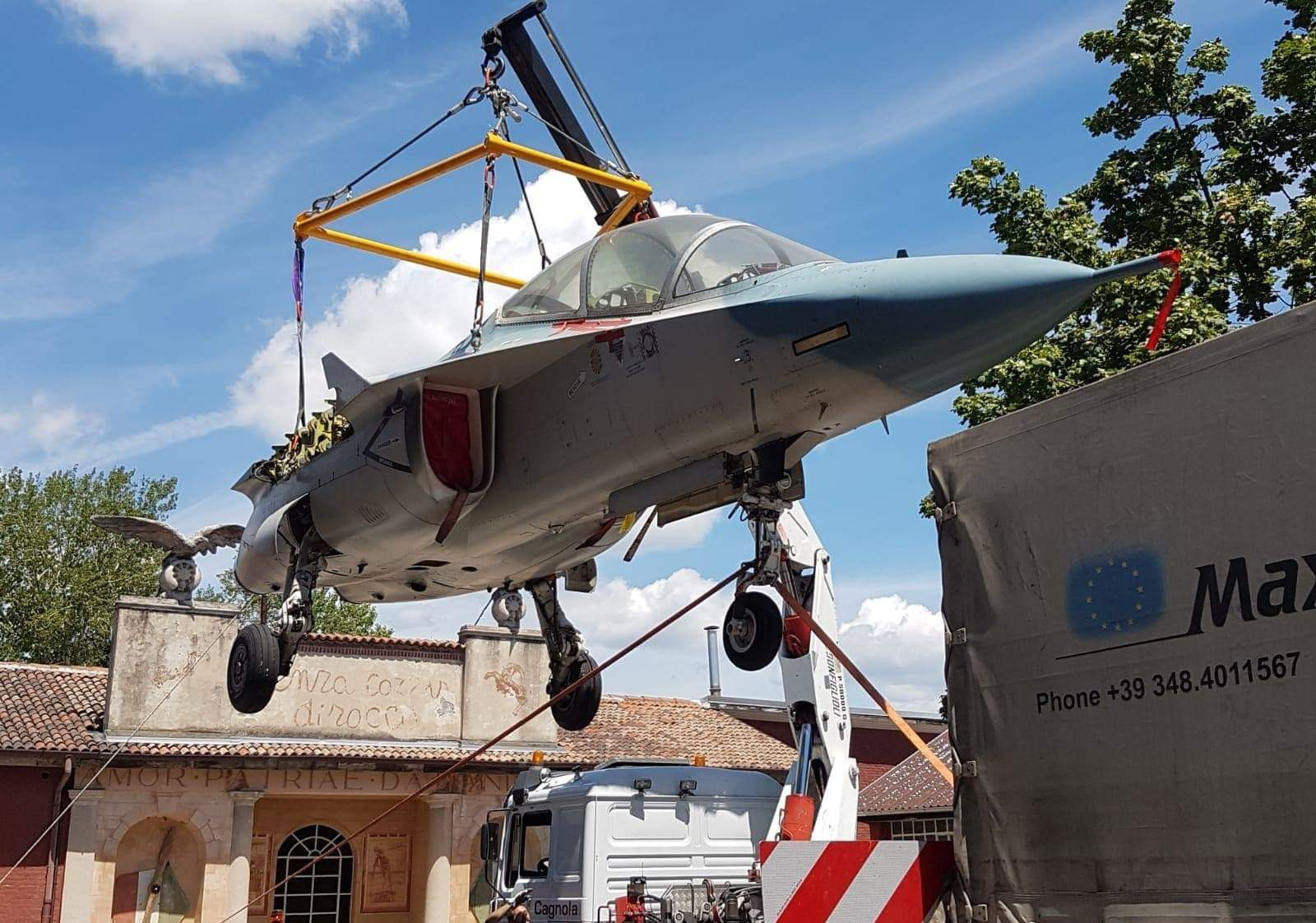
The second Aermacchi M-346 prototype during transport operations.

== Collections ==
The initial intent of the museum was to make the history of world aviation known, with particular attention to the companies that have made the history of flight in Italy, such as the Caproni, the Agusta, the Aermacchi and the SIAI-Marchetti, all based in the province of Varese. With the acquisition of the Bertoni and Bertone collections, which focus on the automobile and the Ogliari collection, mainly focused on rail and road transport, the museum has taken on the aptitude to range over the entire transport world in general.

=== Aircraft heritage ===
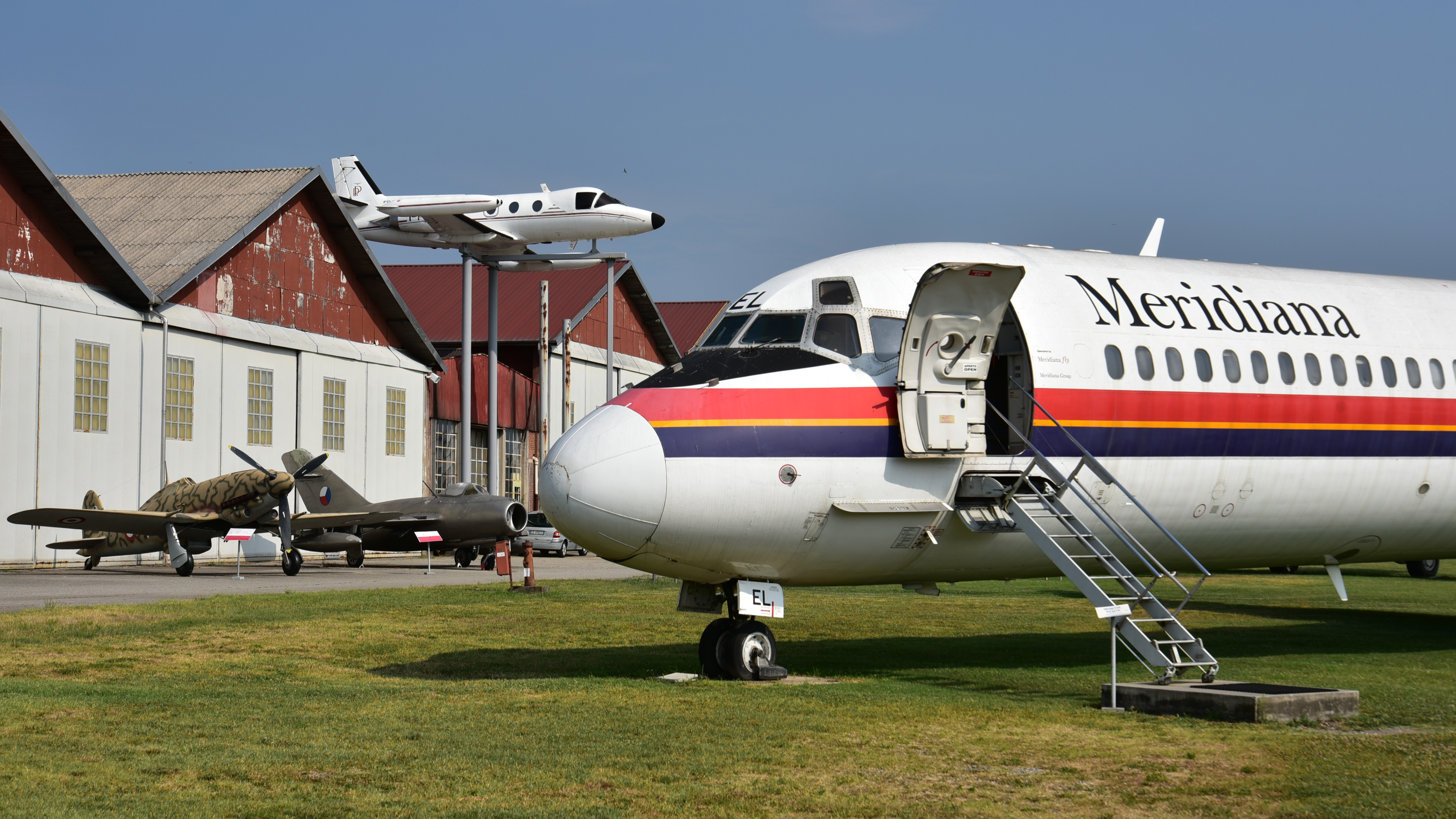
Outdoor area

Volandia's aeronautical museum heritage explores all the main topics related to fixed-wing and rotary-wing flight, from commercial to military aviation. The helicopter heritage is also of great value and size.

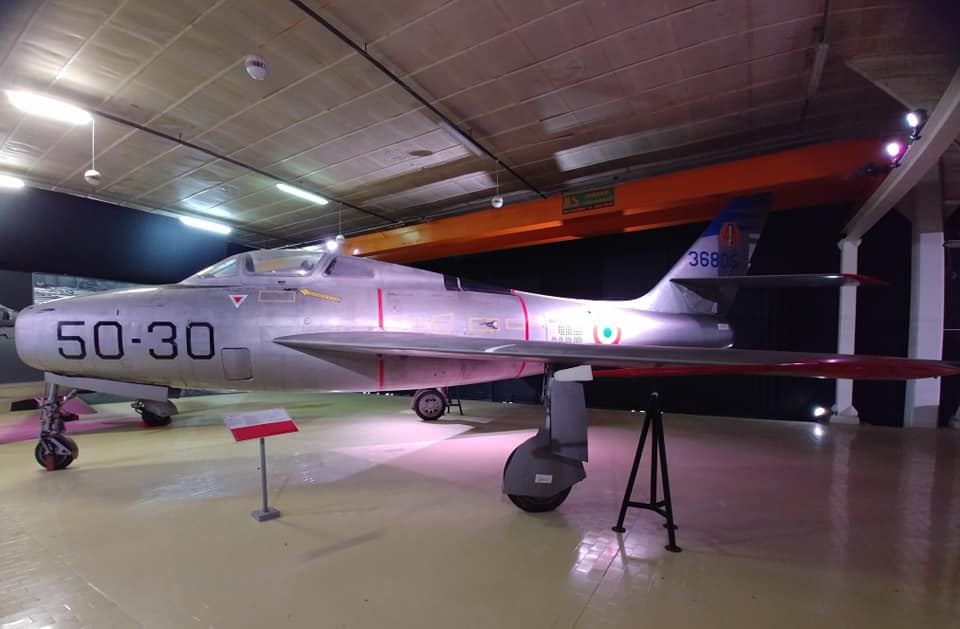
Republic F-84F Thunderstreak

The museum preserves and exhibits some of the most iconic models in the history of Italian aeronautics, including the pioneering Caproni Ca.1, the first aircraft to take off from the Malpensa moorland. The Caproni Ca.18 belong to the period of consolidation of the air fleet (first plane of national conception to fully equip an Italian squadron) and the Caproni Ca.113, one of the most famous aerobatic aircraft of the years between the two wars. The era of the jet engine is revived through the Fiat G.91 (the first Italian aircraft to equip the National Acrobatic Patrol), the AMX Ghibli, the trainers MB.326 and MB.339 and the 3 prototypes of SIAI-Marchetti S.211. There are also numerous examples of the era used by other foreign air forces, such as the Mikoyan-Gurevich MiG-15 and Mikoyan-Gurevich MiG-21, the Republic F-84F Thunderstreak and North American F-86 Sabre, the BAC Jet Provost and the de Havilland Vampire.

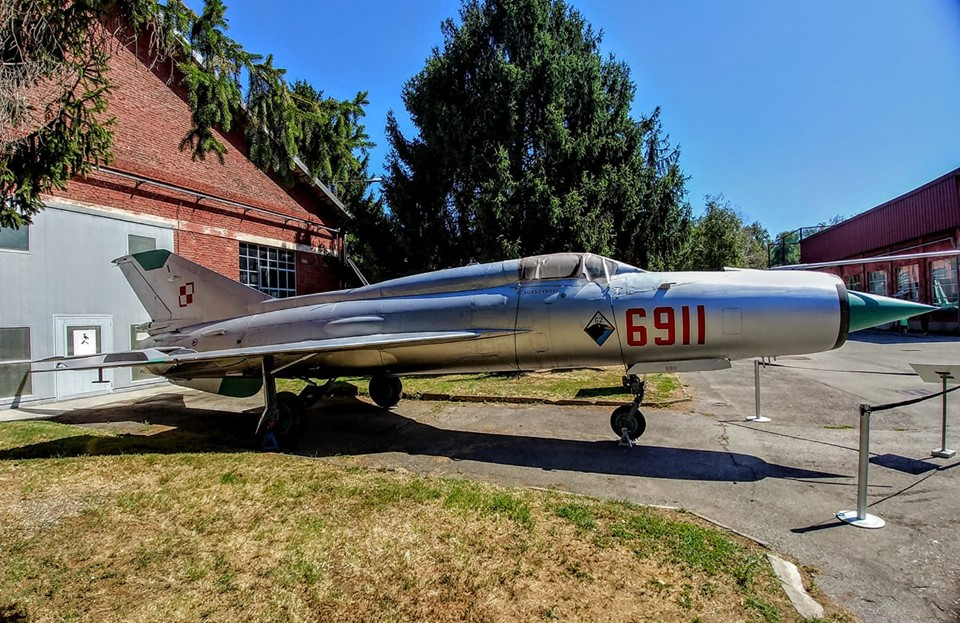
Mikoyan-Gurevich MiG-21

The history and development of commercial aviation are represented by the specimens of Douglas DC-3 Dakota, McDonnell Douglas MD-80 and Fokker 27, the most commercially successful aircraft of the respective eras. Of significant historical value is also the Douglas DC-9 of the Presidency of the Italian Republic. The President of the Republic Sandro Pertini, Pope John Paul II and other Heads of State and Government traveled on the sample in question at the 31st Wing of the Italian Air Force. The plane also transported the coffin of the Formula 1 champion Ayrton Senna, who died tragically following an accident in the 1994 San Marino Grand Prix, from the Bologna airport to the Paris airport.

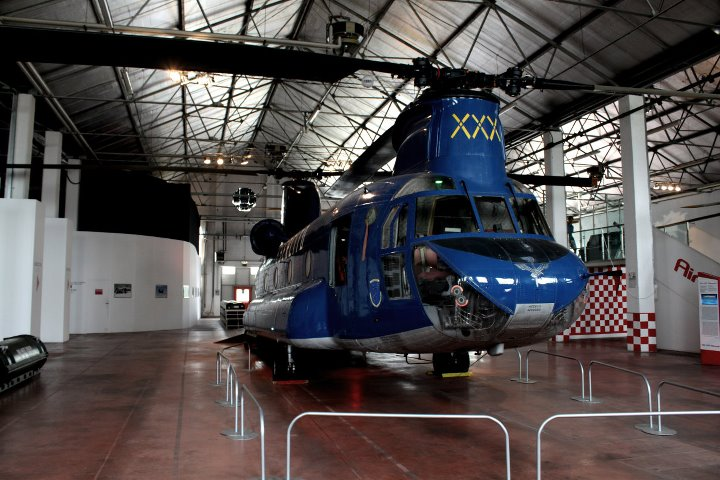
Boeing CH-47

In the section of the museum dedicated to the rotating wing, Italian and foreign helicopters are preserved. Particular attention is paid to Agusta models. Among these, the AB.47 G3B1, under the Arma dei Carabinieri from 1966 to 1977, the AgustaWestland AW109 A-II, which allowed the Guardia di Finanza to achieve night-time operational capacity, the AgustaWestland AW139 and the AB.204 and AB.206-A1. A special space is reserved for the AgustaWestland AW609 convertiplane, an aircraft designed and built to obtain an effective synthesis between the helicopter's operational versatility and the airplane's own advantages.

=== Bertone Collection ===
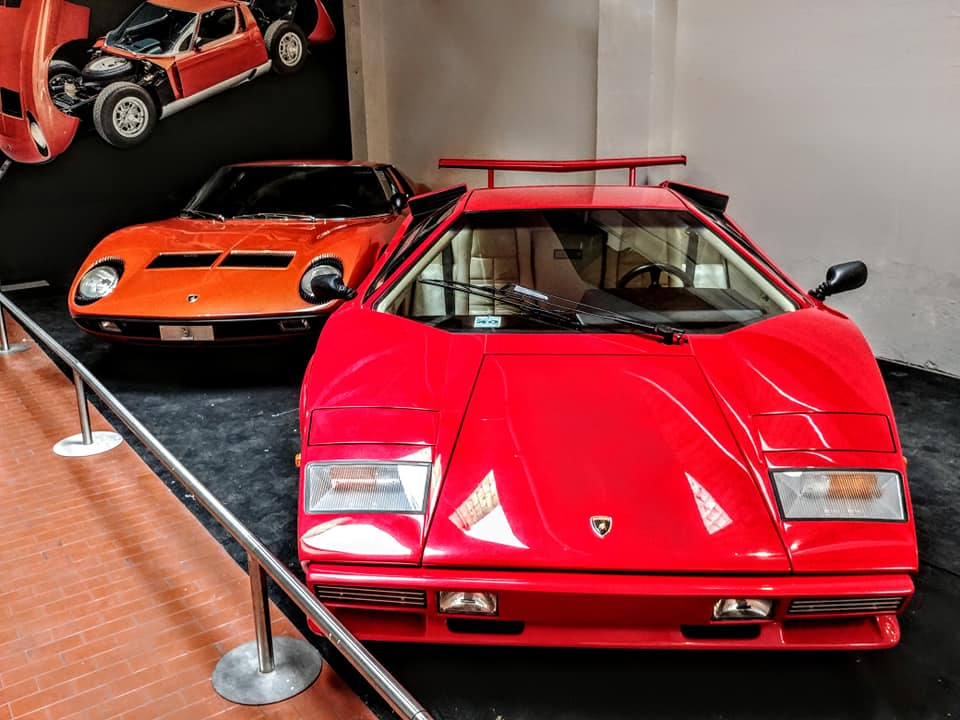
Lamborghini Miura and Lamborghini Countach.

Purchased by the Italian Historical Automotoclub in 2015, since 2018 the Bertone Collection has been preserved in the homonymous pavilion of Volanda. The collection includes 76 cars - in addition to a motorcycle and a bicycle - designed by the Turin atelier Bertone and his collaborators. Among the models on display, a Lamborghini Miura S from 1967, an Alfa Romeo Giulia SS from 1963 and the Lancia Stratos HF, protagonist of an extraordinary series of sporting successes. Prototypes such as the BMW Birusa, the Porsche Karisma, the Ferrari 308 GT4 Rainbow, the Aston Martin Rapid Jet, the two Jaguar PU99 and the Bertone Birusa are also of considerable interest.

=== Bertoni Museum ===
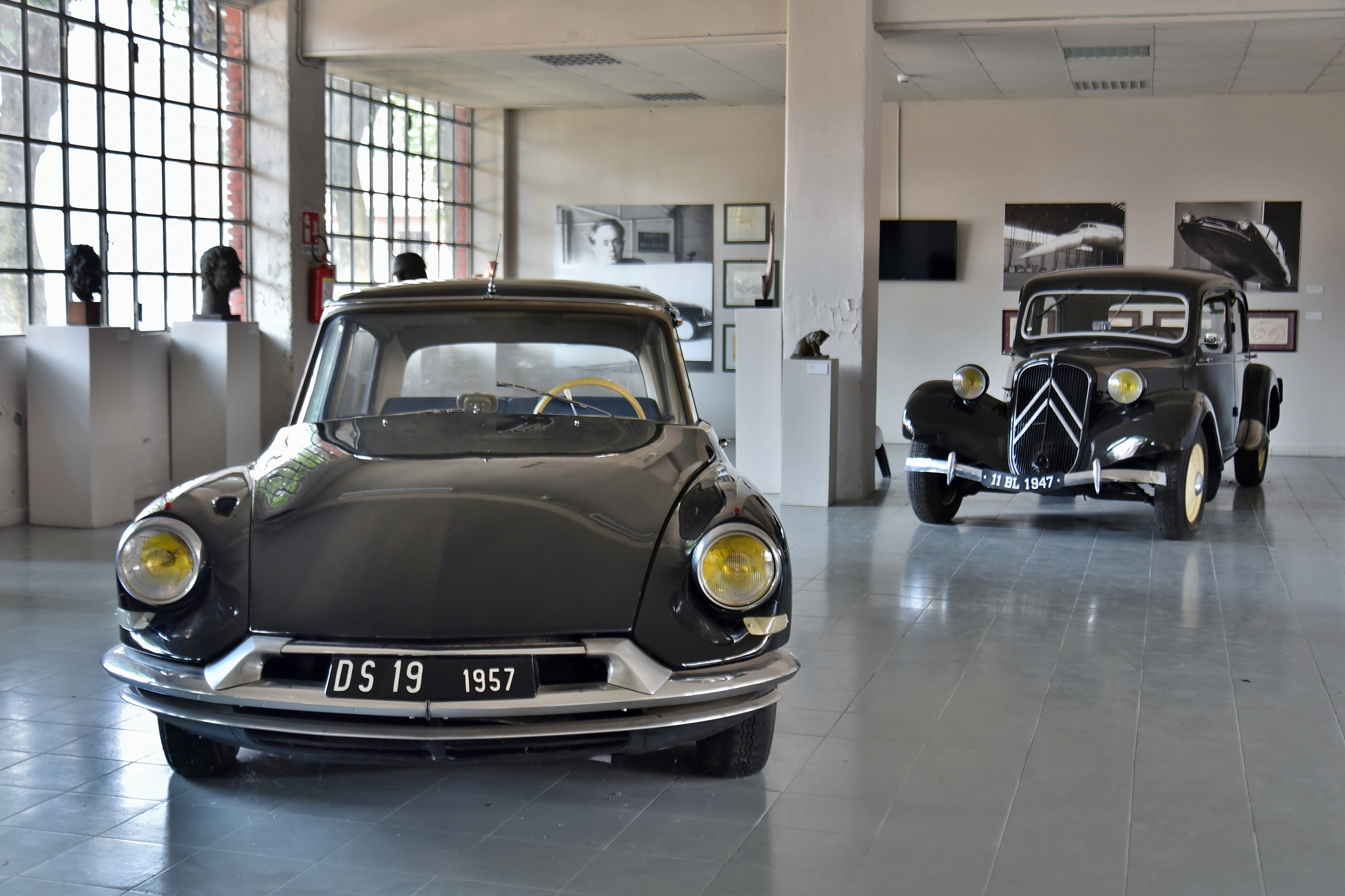
Two of the three Bertoni-designed Citroëns, in the Bertoni Museum

The Flaminio Bertoni Museum brings together much of the creative and intellectual production of the designer from Varese, considered one of the greatest car stylists of all time. In addition to the three most famous cars designed by Bertoni (the Citroën Traction Avant of 1934, the 2CV of 1948 and the DS of 1955), the museum also includes numerous sculptures and sketches by the artist.

=== Piazzai Collection ===
The Piazzai Collection brings together more than 1200 scale models that trace the history of world aviation from the dawn of pioneering flight to the most recently designed aircraft.

== Pavilions ==
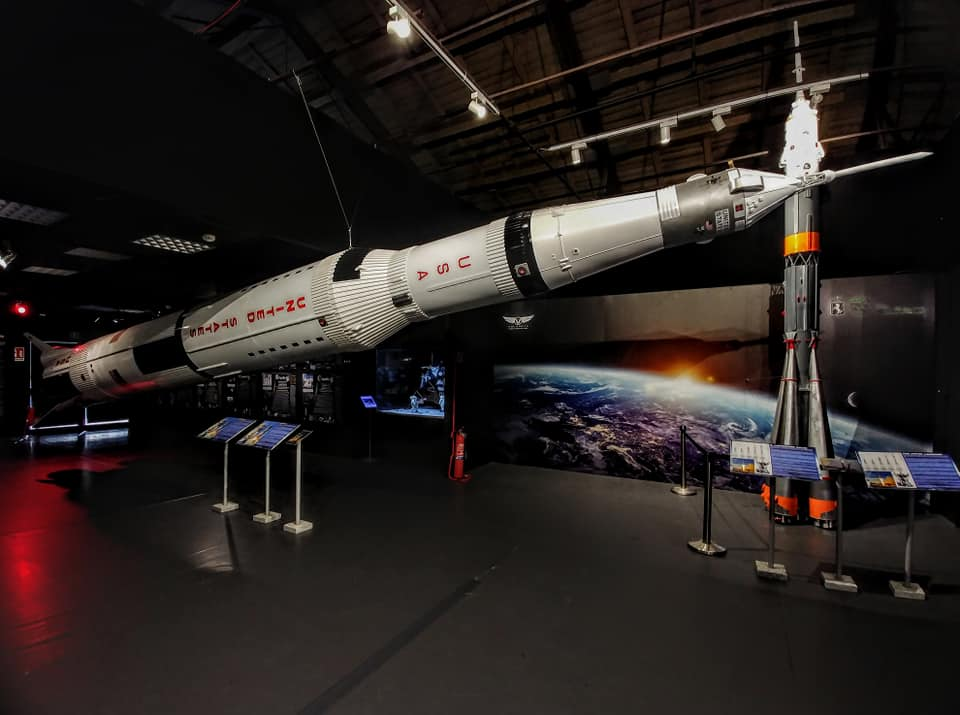
Astronomy and Space Pavilion

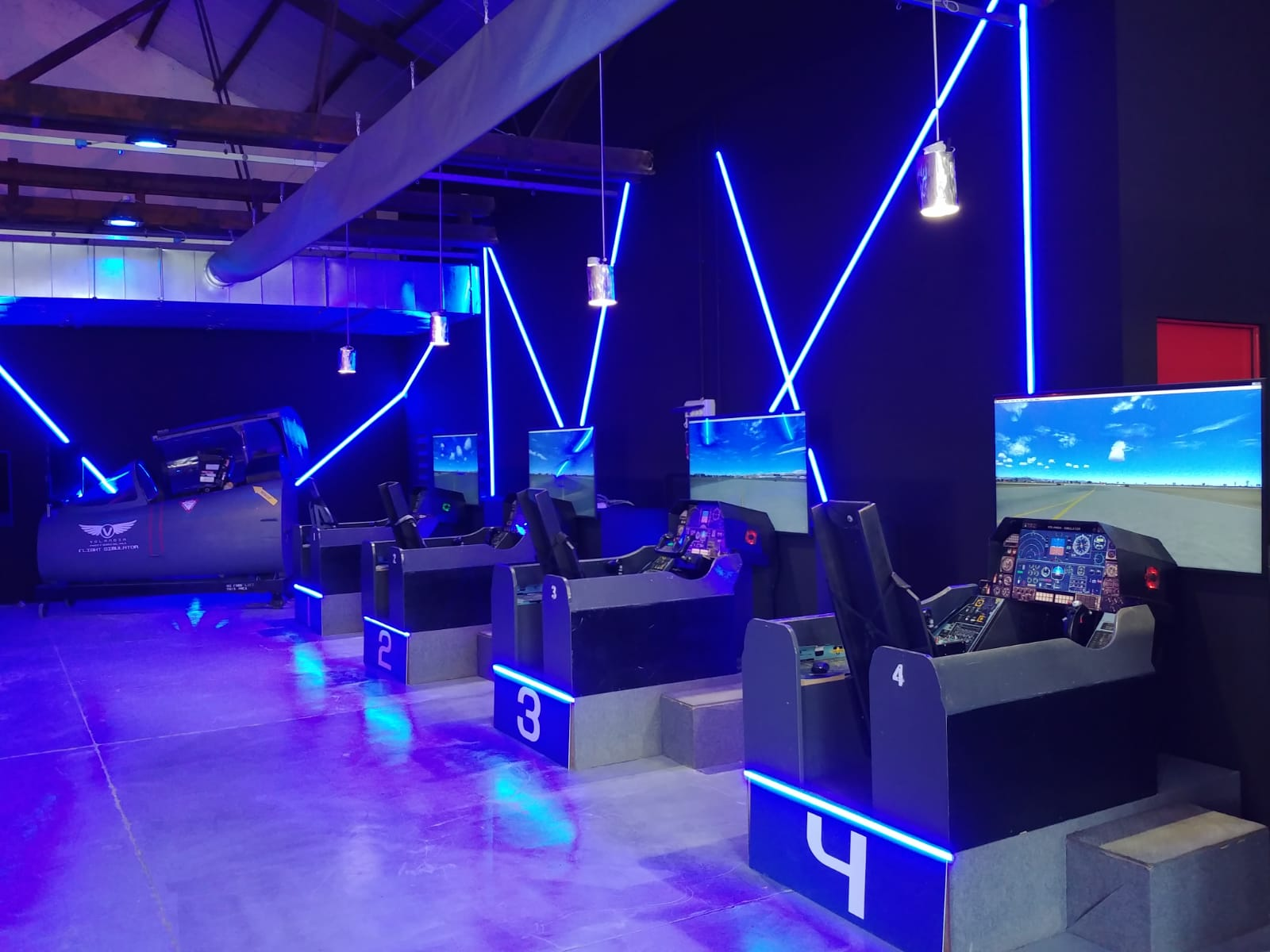
The simulators area of the museum

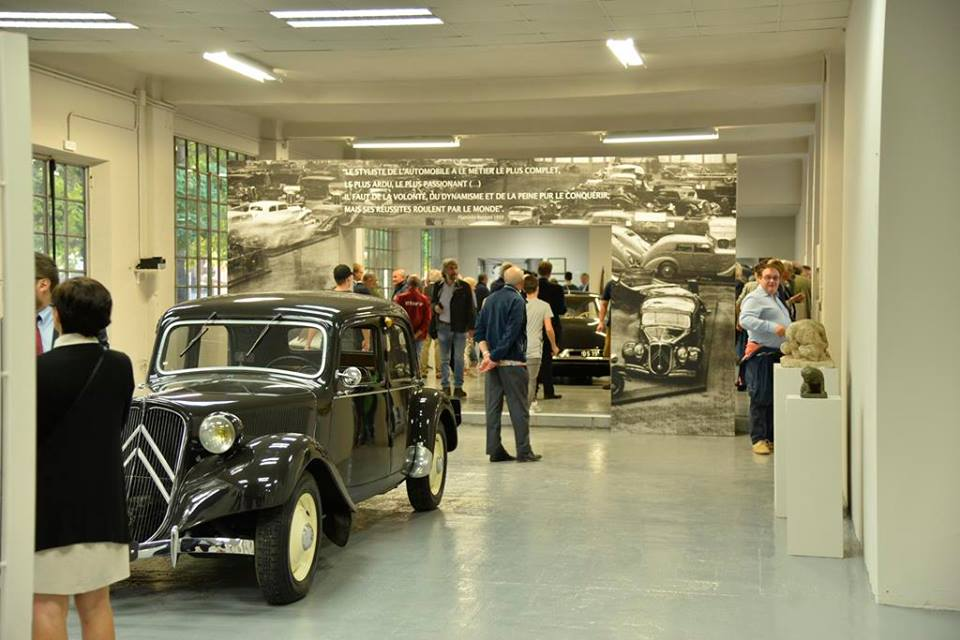
Bertoni Museum

- Astronomy and Space Pavilion: museum area that traces the history and development of space exploration, from the first observations of Galileo's Moon in 1609 to recent international missions. The pavilion is equipped with a planetarium equipped with a powerful projector and FullDome videos; in it are also placed the 1:10 scale reproductions of the Usa Saturno V and Soyuz launcher, a vector still used today to supply the International Space Station with material and men. 30 models are also exhibited, on a scale of 1: 114, which narrate 70 years of space launches.
- The forms of flight: presentation of the various forms of flight (gliding, fixed wing, rotating wing). On the exhibition route, various devices and aircraft of the Varese and Lombardy aeronautical industries follow one another.
- The first flight to Malpensa: section in which the Caproni Ca.1 is located, accompanied by an installation that reproduces the setting of the first - and only - flight of the pioneering aircraft of the Caproni home.
- Officina Caproni: reconstruction of the workshop of the first Italian aeronautical company, established at the beginning of the 20th century.
- Fixed wing: chronological and thematic exposition, from the first propeller-driven aircraft to the modern jet engine aircraft. From balloon flights to great enterprises with Bleriot XI and Gabardini Seaplane.
- Rotating wing: section that focuses on the use of the civil and military helicopter, from the smallest Autogyro to the large helicopters of the Army and the Navy.
- Outdoor play area
- Indoor play area
- Piazzai area
- Drones area: space managed by the GULLP association which includes an exhibition part and a real "LAB" dedicated to the study, planning and realization of UAV / Drones aircraft and in general of projects related to flight and new technologies.
- The future of flight: pavilion dedicated to the history of AgustaWestland and the AW609 convertiplane..
- Ogliari museum.
- Simulators area: area dedicated to flight simulation. Ten simulators - four for under 12 and 6 for over 12 - that allow you to experience the experience of flying aboard famous aircraft such as the MB.339 military trainer and the AgustaWestland AW139 helicopter.

== See also ==
- List of aerospace museums
