= Roe III Triplane =

III Triplane
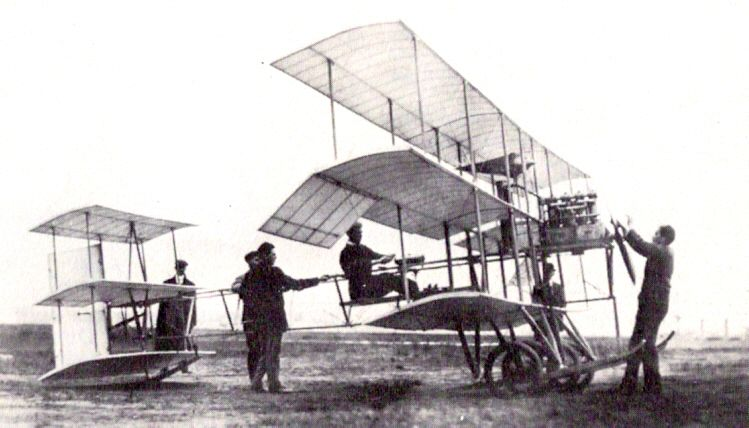
- Alliot Verdon Roe in the cockpit of his Roe III Triplane in September 1910 during his visit to the United States.

General information
- Type: Experimental aircraft
- Manufacturer: Avro
- Designer: Alliott Verdon Roe
- Number built: 6

History
- First flight: 24 June 1910

The Roe III Triplane was an early aircraft designed by the British aircraft manufacturer Avro. In configuration, it was similar to the Roe II Triplane, with a triplane tailplane and an open-top fuselage of triangular cross-section, but the Roe III was a two-seater, and featured ailerons for the first time in a Roe design. The five (some sources give three) production machines differed from the prototype in having the ailerons fitted to the middle wing (the prototype's were on the upper wing) and in being powered by a Green engine in place of the prototype's JAP.

One example was sold to the Harvard Aeronautical Society, one was exported to the United States, and two others suffered a curious fate while en route to the 1910 Blackpool Meeting - sparks from the steam locomotive taking them to Blackpool set fire to the aircraft. Roe was able to quickly replace them with new aircraft built from spare parts.

== Specifications ==
General characteristics

- Crew: 1
- Capacity: 1 pax
- Length: 23 ft 0 in (7.01 m)
- Wingspan: 31 ft 0 in (9.45 m)
- Wing area: 287 sq ft (26.7 m^{2})
- Gross weight: 750 lb (340 kg)
- Powerplant: 1 × Green C.4 4-cylinder water-cooled in-line piston engine, 35 hp (26 kW)
- Propellers: 2-bladed fixed-pitch propeller

== See also ==
Related development Roe I Biplane - Roe I Triplane - Roe II Triplane - Roe III Triplane - Roe IV Triplane

== Bibliography ==
- Jackson, A.J. (1990). Avro Aircraft Since 1908 (2nd ed.). London: Putnam. pp. 12–15. ISBN 0-85177-834-8.
- Taylor, Michael J. H. (1989). Jane's Encyclopedia of Aviation. London: Studio Editions. p. 91.
- World Aircraft Information Files. London: Bright Star Publishing. pp. File 889 Sheet 92.
