= Caproni Ca.1 (1910) =

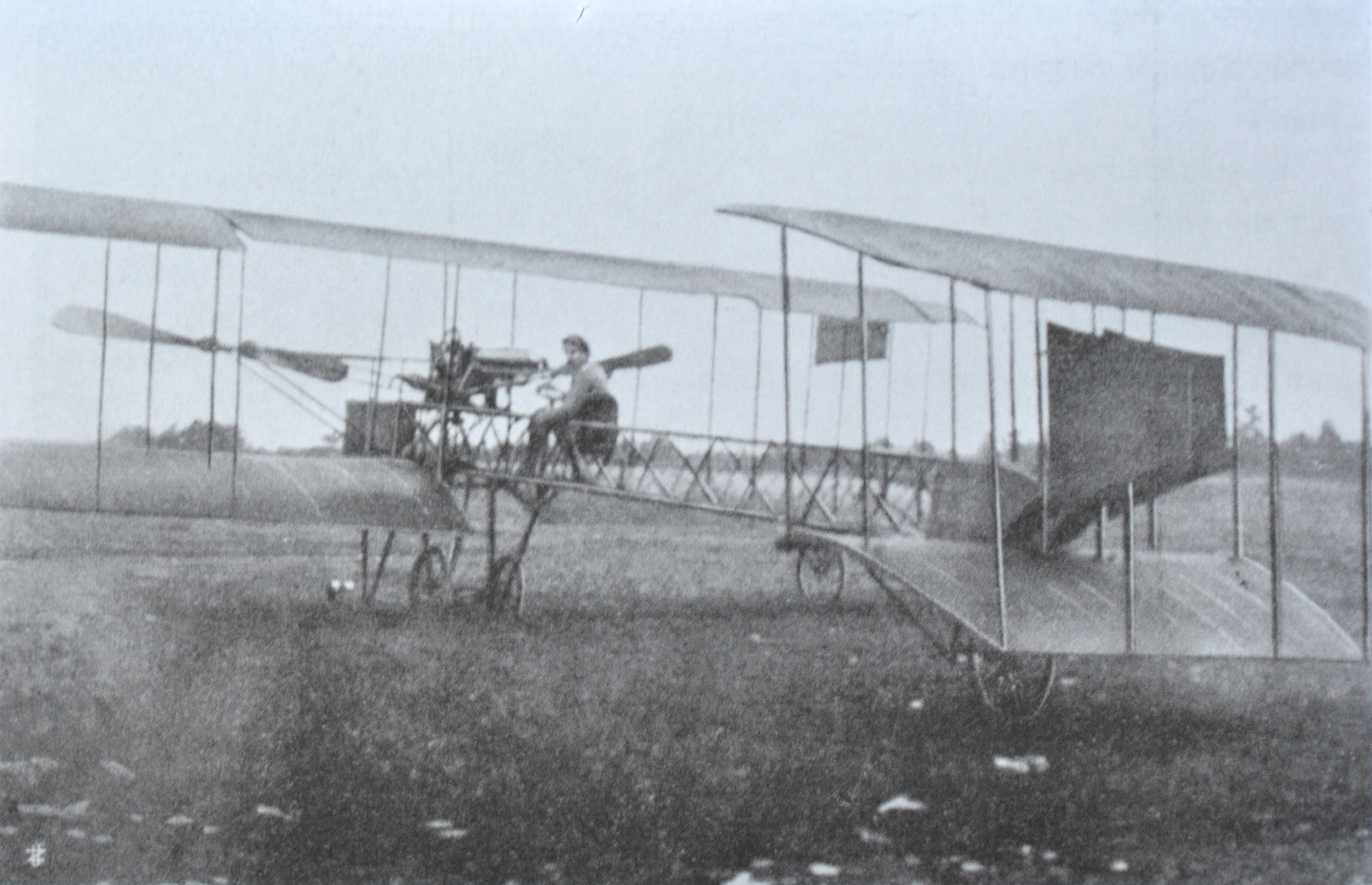
- Rear view of Gianni Caproni's first experimental biplane, the Caproni Ca.1, in Malpensa (Varese) in 1910.

General information
- Type: Experimental aircraft
- Manufacturer: Gianni Caproni
- Designer: Gianni Caproni
- Status: On display at the Volandia aviation museum
- Number built: 1

History
- First flight: 27 May 1910

The Caproni Ca.1 was an experimental biplane built in Italy in 1910. It was the first aircraft to be designed and built by aviation pioneer Gianni Caproni, although he had previously collaborated with Henri Coandă on sailplane designs.

The Ca.1 had an uncovered rectangular truss as a fuselage; its two-bay wing cellule featured unstaggered mainplanes of equal span. Although the engine was mounted in the nose, it drove propellers mounted in front of the wings on long struts. The landing gear consisted of a dual mainwheel and skid arrangement, with outrigger wheels at each wingtip and a tailwheel.

The Ca.1 flew for the first time on 27 May 1910; although the flight was rather successful, the aircraft crashed while landing and was heavily damaged; it was repaired, but never flew again. The Ca.1 is now on display at the Volandia aviation museum in Italy.

== Development ==
Gianni Caproni had begun his experiments in the field of aviation in 1908. In that year, together with his Romanian friend and colleague Henri Coandă, he designed and built a biplane glider whose flights took place in the surroundings of Blaumal (in the Ardennes) and were largely successful, leading Caproni to carry on his aeronautical studies. In 1909 he met several aviators and aircraft designers in Paris, where he also witnessed the flights of some of the most recent aeroplanes.

While still in France, Caproni began designing his first engined aircraft. In June 1909, after going back to Italy, he made an attempt to collect the money he needed to build the machine in Alessandria; however, he didn't manage to convince the local investors of the worthiness of his projects. It was only in December, after spending a period of time in Belgium in order to complete his specialization in electrical engineering, that Caproni went back to his hometown, Arco, and was finally able to gather some collaborators, thanks to whom he would begin the construction of the experimental biplane that was going to become known as the Caproni Ca.1.

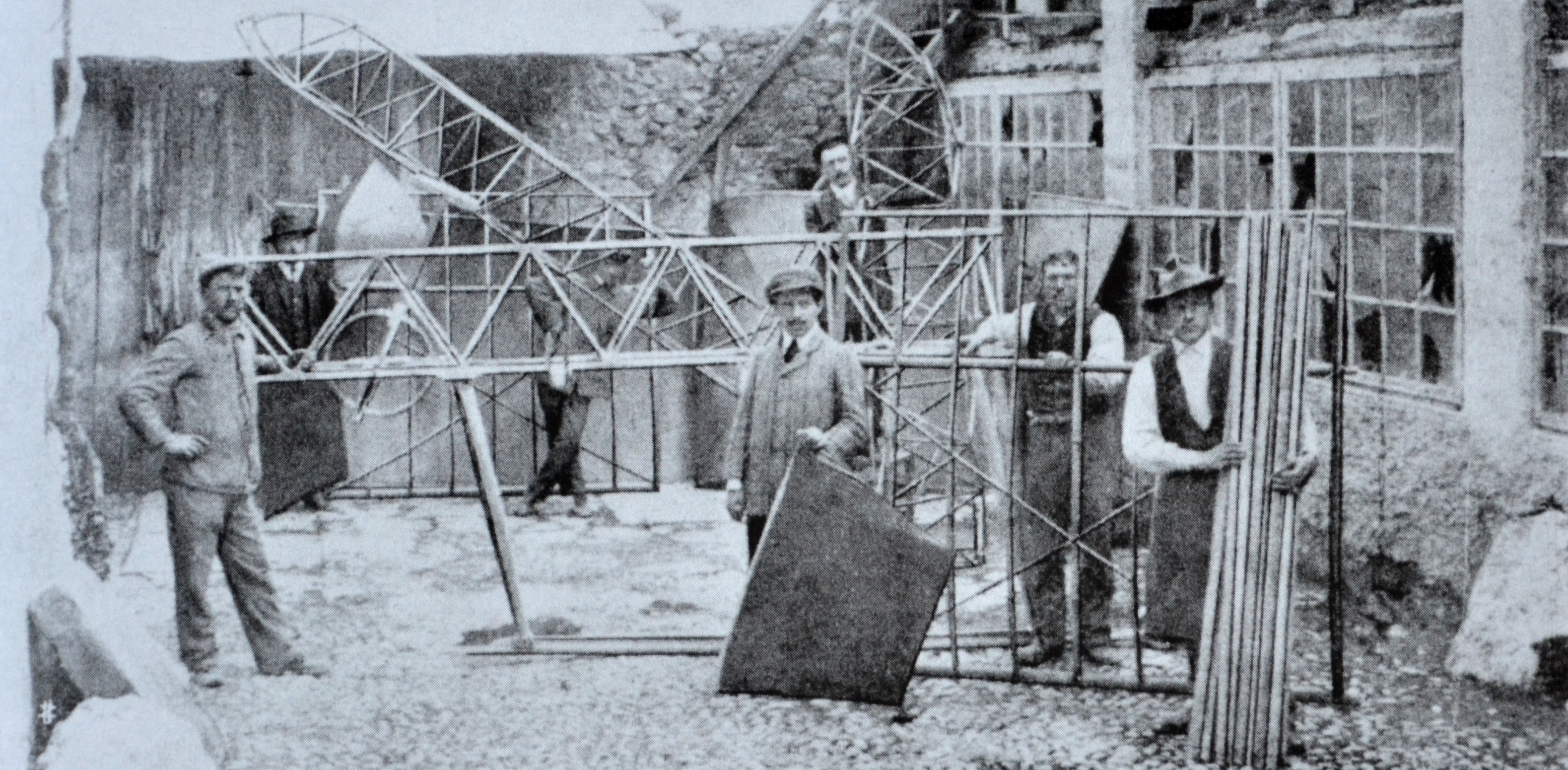
An early phase of the construction of the Caproni Ca.1 in Arco, Italy, late 1909 or early 1910.

Between December 1909 and the first few months of 1910, Caproni worked on the construction of the Ca.1 in an improvised workshop which he had set up inside a warehouse with the help of three carpenters. However, because of the lack of any surface suitable for having an aircraft take off and land in Trentino, Caproni decided to move to Lombardy in order to carry out the test flights. He thus joined his elder brother, Federico (who had graduated from the Bocconi University of Milan shortly before), and asked the Arma del Genio (the military engineering corps of the Esercito Italiano) for permission to settle at the cascina of Malpensa, in semi-desert area which at the time was in use as a training ground for the cavalry. The permission was granted and so, after building a hangar close to the cascina, on 5 April 1910, the two Caproni brothers and their collaborators, Ernesto "Ernestin" Gaias and Ernesto "Erneston" Contrini from Arco, moved to Malpensa. The parts of the Ca.1 that had already been assembled were transported from Arco to Ala on carriages, and then reached Gallarate by train; their journey started on 8 April and ended in Malpensa on 11 April.

The four men were going to spend one year living in primitive accommodation and working in the hangar, which also served as a workshop. There were no comforts and the project of building and flying the Ca.1 was very demanding from both a technical and financial point of view. However, Caproni was later to think back to the first period he spent in Malpensa as a time of happiness and peace of mind.

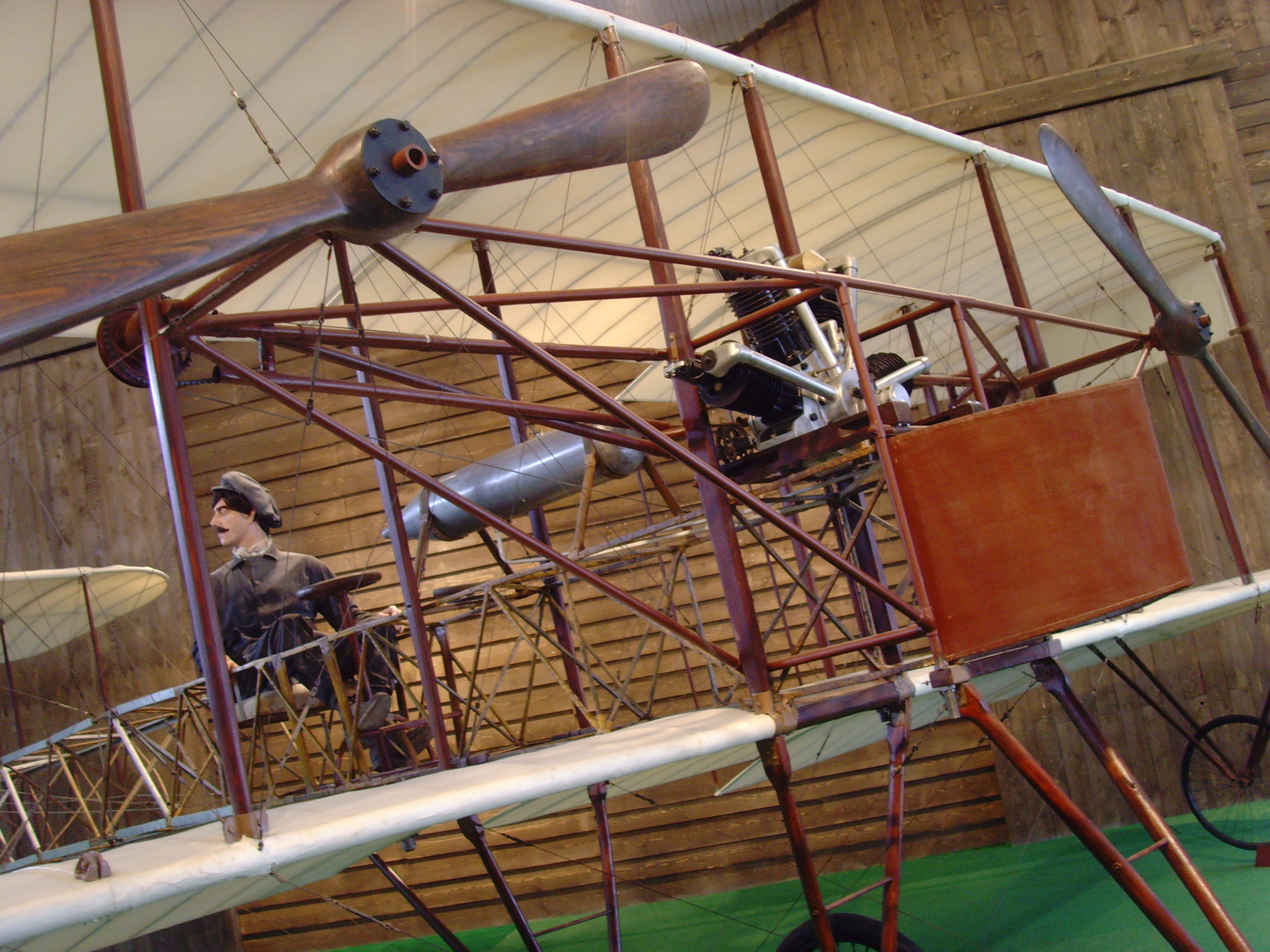
The original Ca.1 is on display at the Volandia aviation museum, not far from Malpensa Airport. Note the fan engine, the fuel tank, the twin pulling propellers and the pilot's position.

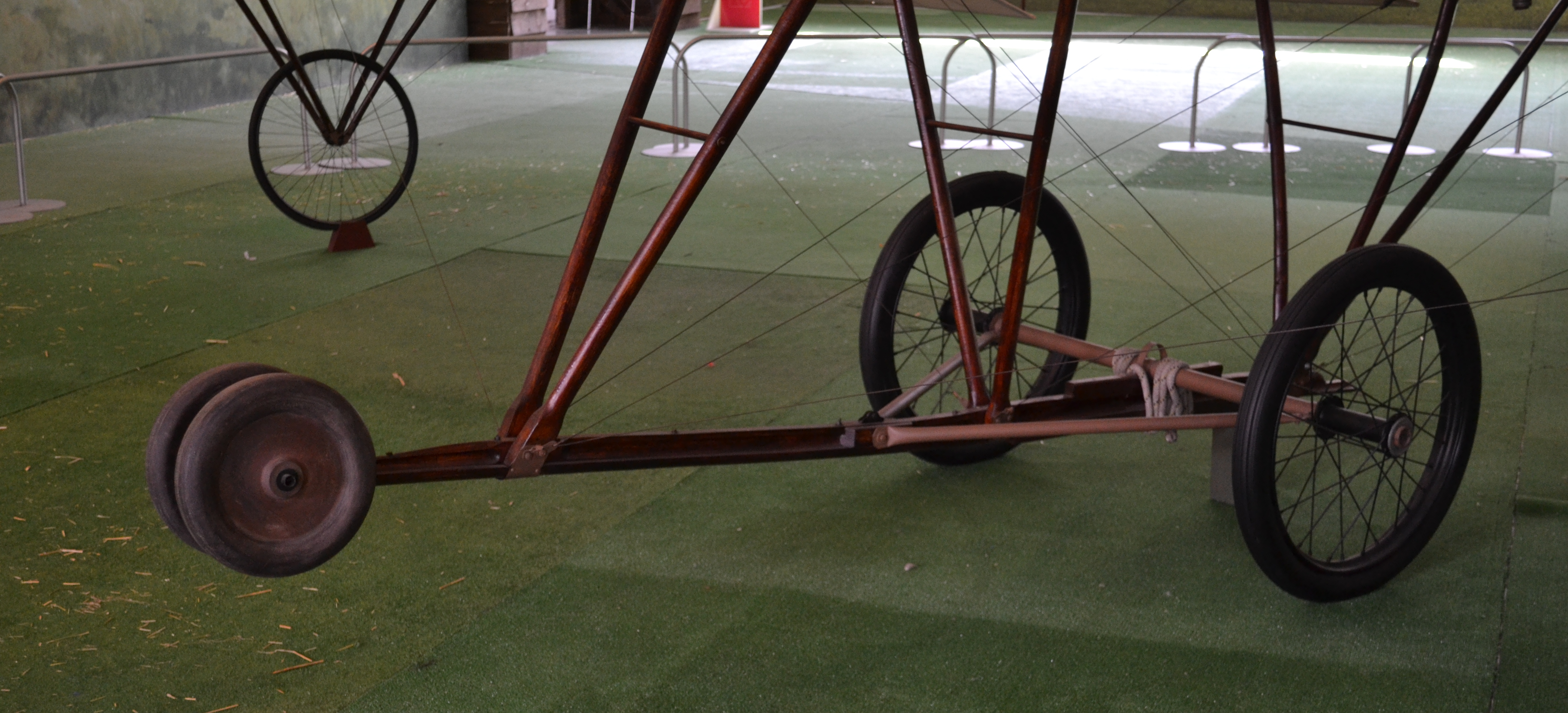
A detail of the landing gear of the Caproni Ca.1.

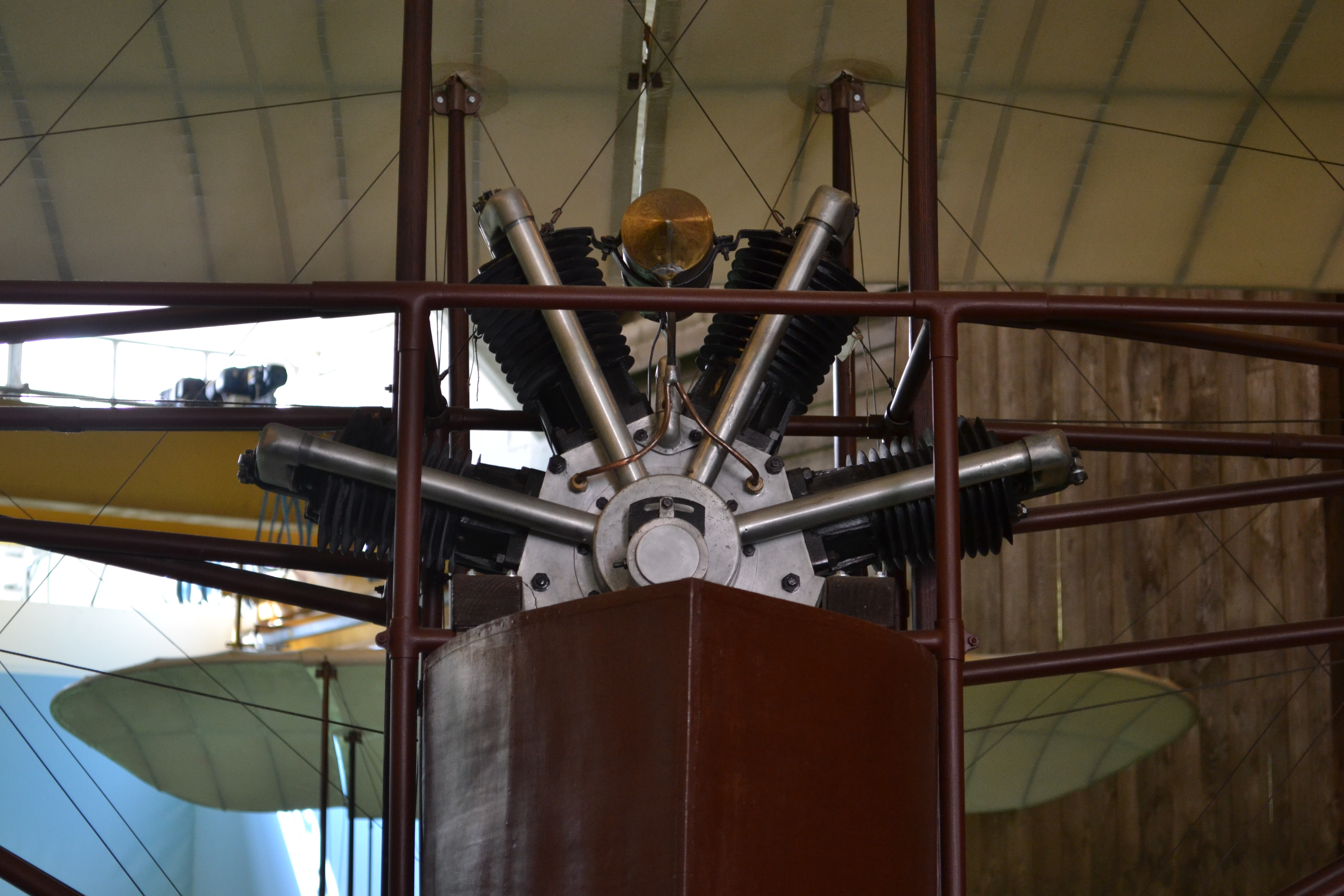
A detail of the four-cylinder fan engine of the Caproni Ca.1.

The aircraft was assembled in a few weeks, but Caproni still had to find an engine and a pilot. He tried to solve the first problem by buying an engine built by the recently founded Miller company of Turin; the engine wasn't expensive and the Trentine engineer was glad to use an Italian-built piece of technology, because of his irredentist sentiments; however, the four-cylinder W engine proved quite unreliable and was apparently unable to run smoothly for more than a few minutes at a time. As far as the second problem was concerned, Caproni decided to have Ugo Tabacchi, a Veronese-born Trentine chauffeur who had recently joined Caproni's team, pilot the maiden flight of his aircraft. Although some licensed pilots (mostly trained on Wright aircraft) were already available in Italy, Caproni couldn't afford to hire any of them.

The aircraft was ready for the first test flight in May 1910.

== Design ==
The Caproni Ca.1 was a light single-engine biplane featuring an uncovered rectangular truss as a fuselage, two unstaggered mainplanes of equal span, a biplane tailplane and a twin-propeller pulling configuration.

The fuselage was composed of a long rectangular truss; the structure was of honeyberry wood with aluminum connections, allowing for a light and flexible construction, comparatively robust and easy to fix in case of accidents. This technique was, however, expensive and therefore it was abandoned in subsequent designs.

The fuselage was connected to the wings in proximity of the nose of the aircraft, while the empennage was located at its rear end. Both the horizontal stabilizer and the vertical stabilizer were composed of twin aerodynamic surfaces. The wings were fitted with ailerons and had a conventional structure, with tubular plywood spars and wooden ribs supporting a fabric covering. Between the interplane struts that connected the two wings (which, together with wires, provided structural rigidity) were some vertical surfaces that improved the stability of the aircraft. The tail assembly was composed of two vertical surfaces which acted as rudders and as stabilizers and of two horizontal surfaces whose fixed portion had a lifting and a stabilizing function, while a movable section acted as an elevator. The latter was controlled by the pilot, thanks to a yoke. The wings were fitted with a patented device that allowed its angle of incidence to vary, in order to experiment with different aerodynamic conditions; the tailplanes were fitted with a similar device in order to compensate for the attitude changes caused by the adjustment of the wings.

The fixed landing gear was composed of five large-diameter wheels of which two were located below the central section of the lower wing, one below each wingtip and one supporting the tail. Two smaller wheels, mounted at the forward extremity of an extension of the main landing gear structure, were meant to prevent the aircraft from overturning.

The four-cylinder Miller fan engine drove two wooden two-blade counter-rotating propellers by means of two roller chains. A safety device would block both propellers in case of the failure of one of the chains. The blade pitch could be adjusted while the aircraft was on the ground.

== Test flights ==
The prairie around Malpensa was a moorland covered with heather, bushes and small trees, and it was not clear enough to allow an aircraft to take off and land. The nearest surface sufficiently clear and level was close to Gallarate. The Ca.1 had to be towed there by a donkey, the trip taking around 30 minutes.

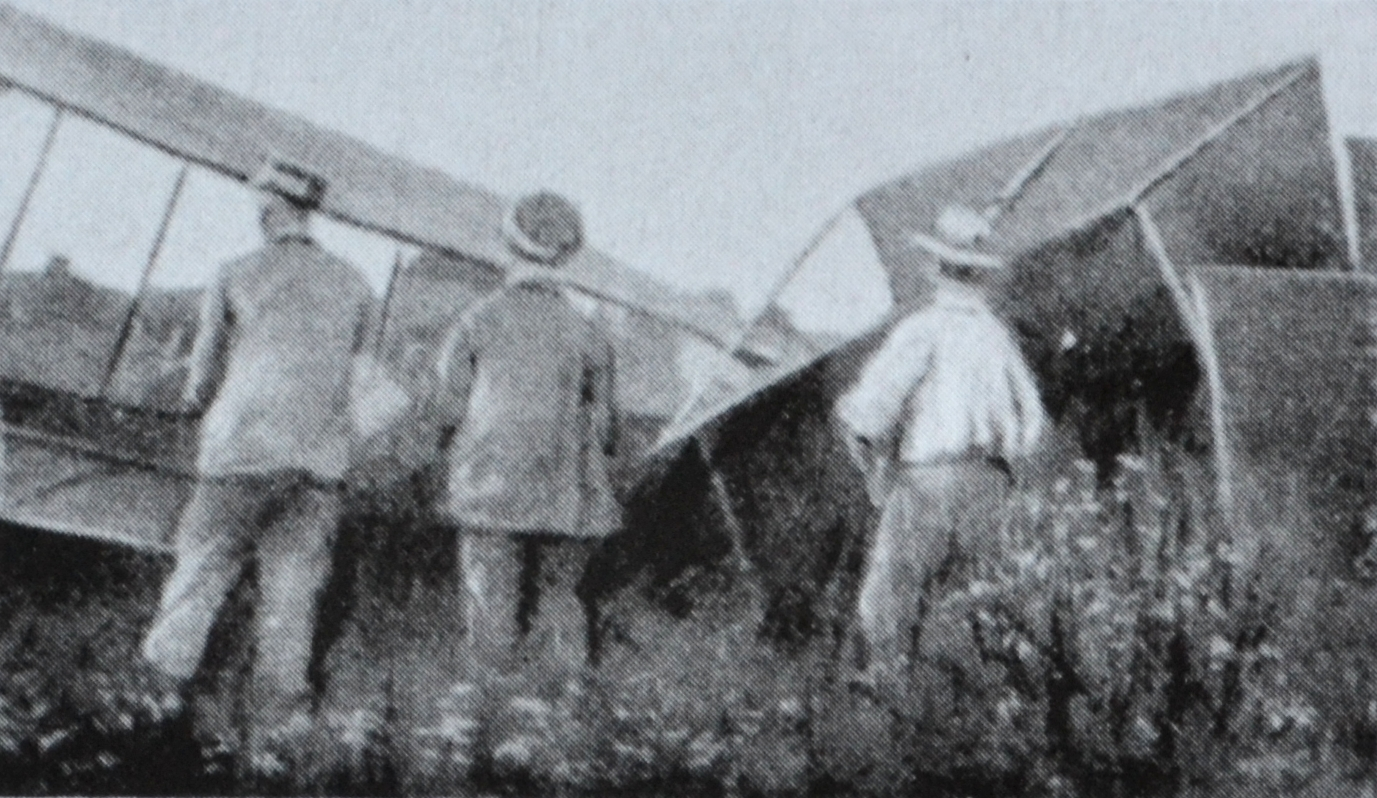
The Ca.1 was heavily damaged at the end of its first flight.

When the final assembly of the aircraft was completed, several days of bad weather conditions prevented the flight trials to be undertaken. On 27 May, however, the weather was fair and Caproni decided to make an attempt to fly the Ca.1. Tabacchi managed to have the aircraft take off at the first attempt; it then flew straight and level for a while, but, when the pilot tried to land the aircraft, his lack of experience caused a violent impact with the ground which heavily damaged the aircraft, even though Tabacchi was unscathed. The flight was considered a success, and it proved the worthiness of Caproni's first design.

Caproni immediately started repairing the Ca.1 and, at the same time, he started building the Ca.2. The Ca.1 would not fly again, but Tabacchi used it to gain some familiarity with taxiing and other ground maneuvers while waiting for the next aircraft to be ready to fly.

== Aircraft on display ==
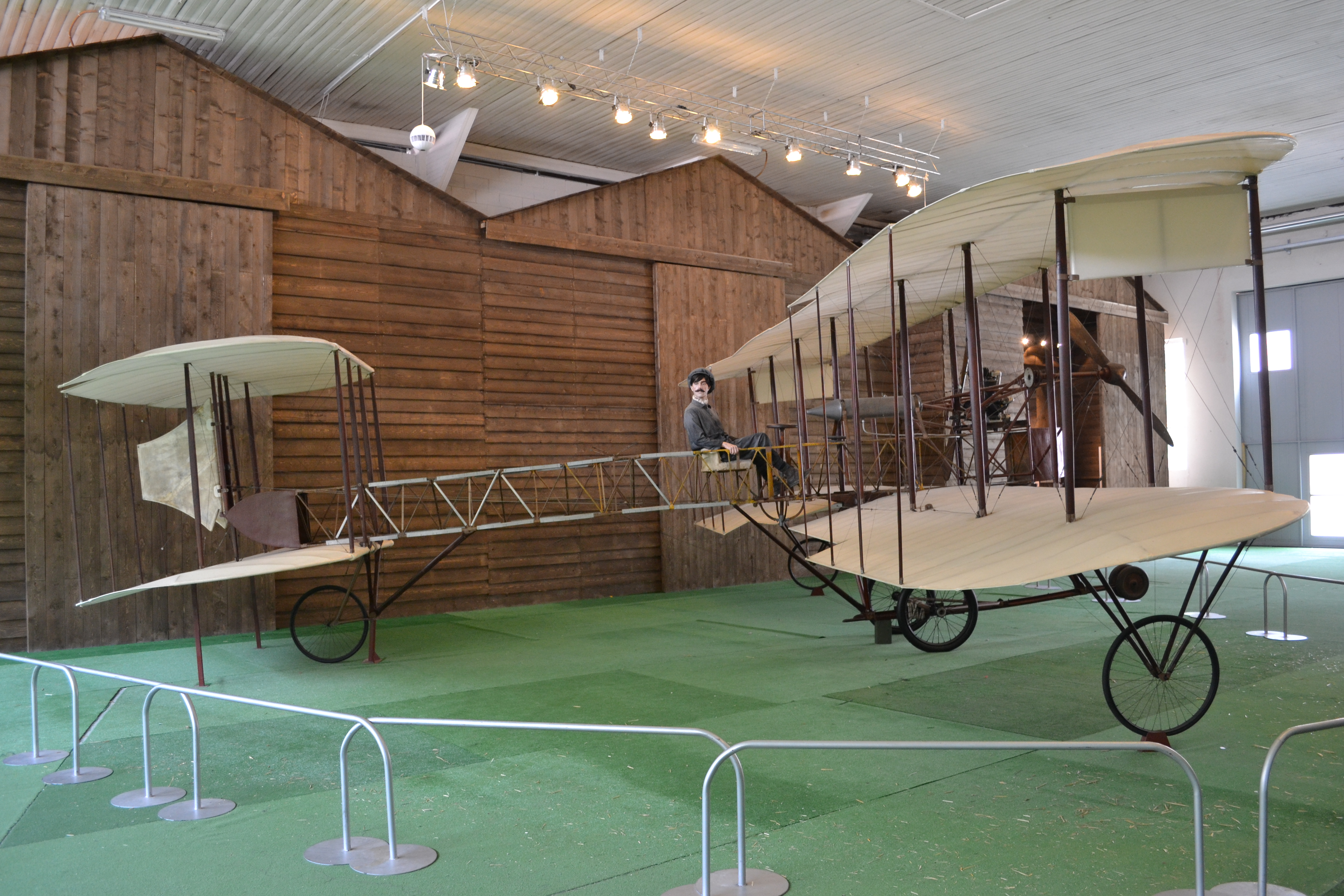
The Ca.1 at Volandia.

The only example of the Ca.1 survived its operational history and, after being superseded by the Ca.2 and subsequent developments, was stored in a warehouse. Conscious of its historical importance, Caproni preserved it with care. In 1927 Gianni Caproni, with the collaboration of his wife Timina Guasti Caproni, opened the Caproni Museum in Taliedo. The Ca.1 was displayed there in 1939, alongside several other historical aircraft, objects and documents connected to the first pioneer flights in Italy. The museum was closed during the Second World War and the Ca.1 was moved to the villa of the Caproni family in Venegono Superiore in order to be safe from Allied bombings. It remained there until 2007. It underwent a restoration process and was finally put on display in the Volandia aviation museum, not far from the Malpensa Airport. The Ca.1 is the oldest preserved aircraft in Italy.

A replica of the Ca.1 was built in the 2000s (decade) by Mario Marangoni; after being on display in Arco for a few days in September 2009, the faithfully rebuilt aircraft participated in the 2010 centennial celebrations that took place at Trento Airport. The aircraft taxied on the runway, but was unable to take off because of the strong wind. Subsequently, the Ca.1 replica was on display at the Gianni Caproni Museum of Aeronautics (adjacent to the Trento Airport) for a brief period.

== Specifications ==
Data from Aeroplani Caproni

General characteristics

- Crew: one pilot
- Length: 9.86 m (32 ft 4 in)
- Wingspan: 10.50 m (34 ft 5 in)
- Height: 3.36 m (11 ft 0 in)
- Wing area: 38 m^{2} (409 sq ft)
- Empty weight: 550 kg (1,210 lb)
- Gross weight: 650 kg (1,430 lb)
- Powerplant: 1 × 4-cylinder Miller fan engine , 18.4 kW (25 hp)

Performance

== Bibliography ==
- Abate, Rosario; Alegi, Gregory; Apostolo, Giorgio (1992). Aeroplani Caproni – Gianni Caproni ideatore e costruttore di ali italiane (in Italian). Museo Caproni.
- Celoria, Giovanni (1913). Tre anni di aviazione nella brughiera di Somma Lombardo (5 aprile 1910 – 5 aprile 1913) (in Italian). Milano: Stab. Tip. Unione Cooperativa. (Reprinted in a facsimile edition edited by Romano Turrini (2004). Trento: Il Sommolago – Museo dell'Aeronautica G. Caproni – Comune di Arco.)
