= Roe IV Triplane =

British aircraft

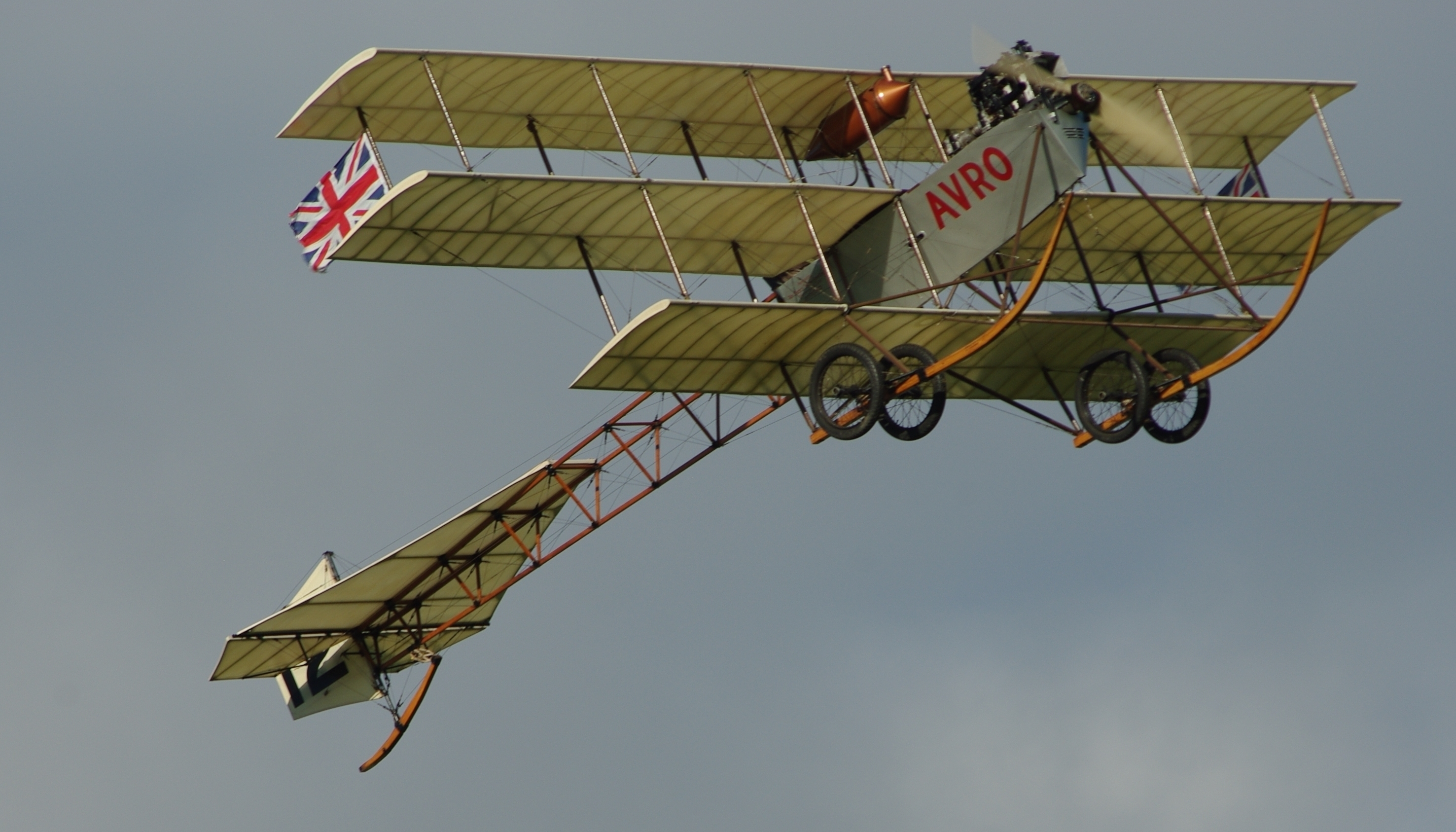
- The Shuttleworth Collection's replica Roe IV Triplane

General information
- Type: Trainer
- Manufacturer: Avro
- Designer: Alliott Verdon Roe
- Number built: 1

History
- First flight: September 1910
- Retired: August 1911

The Roe IV Triplane was an early British triplane designed by Alliott Verdon Roe and built by A.V. Roe and Company. It was first flown in 1910, and the sole example served as a trainer aircraft before being scrapped the following year in 1911. An airworthy replica was later built in the mid-1960s.

== Design and development ==
The Roe IV Triplane resembled Roe's Type III, being a tractor configuration triplane with the lower wing of smaller span than the upper two and a triangular section wire-braced fuselage, which was uncovered behind the pilot's seat. The middle wing was mounted directly above the upper longerons, and there was a gap between the single lower longeron and the lower wing. The wings were connected by four unequally-spaced pairs of interplane struts on either side, the innermost pair on each side being just outboard of the upper longerons and the outer pair connecting only the upper pair of wings due to the shorter span of the lower wing. Although the ailerons fitted to the previous design had been satisfactory, Roe returned to wing warping for lateral control. The lifting triplane tailplanes of the earlier design were replaced by a non-lifting single triangular tailplane with a divided elevator and a small unbalanced rudder. The undercarriage consisted of a pair of skids extending forward of the propeller, with a pair of wheels mounted on each skid, and a sprung tailskid. It was powered by a 35 horsepower (26 kW) Green water-cooled four-cylinder inline engine, with the radiator mounted above the fuselage between the front inner interplane struts.

== Service history ==
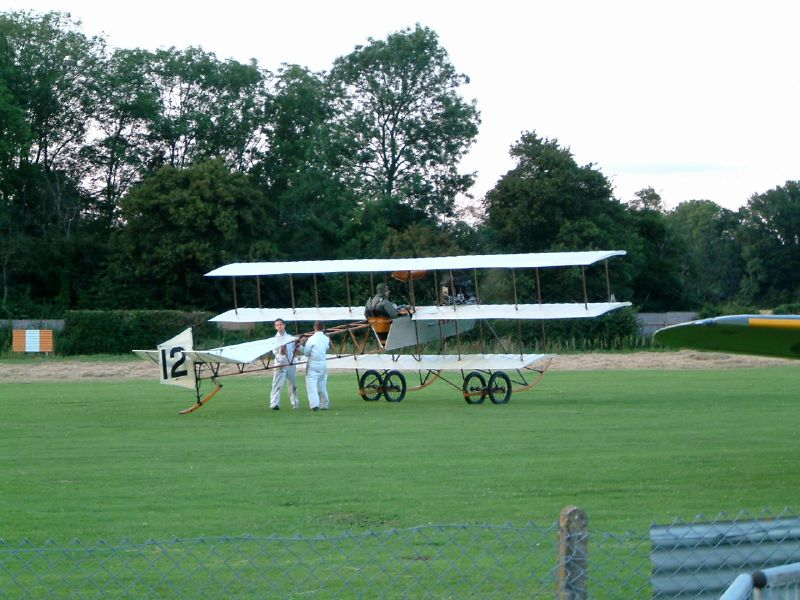
The Shuttleworth replica in 2004

The single example built was used for a while as a trainer at the Avro Flying School at Brooklands, where several pilots who were to become famous learned to fly in it, including Howard Pixton, who gained his Aero Club certificate in it on 24 January 1911. During its service as a trainer it was crashed numerous times, including at least twice into the notorious Brooklands sewage farm. After a crash on 14 February the aircraft was rebuilt with the fuselage lengthened by 4 ft (1.2 m). It continued to be used for training until August 1911, when it was scrapped.

A full-scale flying replica was built for the 1965 film Those Magnificent Men in Their Flying Machines and was afterwards donated to the Shuttleworth Collection. On 30 May 2026, the replica was involved in a crash at the Shuttleworth Wings & Wheels Air Show, when it flew into trees at Old Warden Aerodrome. The pilot was trapped and had to be rescued, and survived with minor injuries, but details on the aircraft's condition have not been released.

== Specifications (as first flown) ==
Data from

General characteristics

- Crew: 1
- Length: 30 ft (9.1 m) (increased to 34 ft (10 m) in February 1911)
- Upper wingspan: 32 ft 0 in (9.75 m)
- Mid wingspan: 32 ft 0 in (9.75 m)
- Lower wingspan: 20 ft 0 in (6.10 m)
- Wing area: 294 sq ft (27.3 m^{2})
- Gross weight: 650 lb (295 kg)
- Powerplant: × Green C.4 4-cylinder water-cooled in-line piston engine, 35 hp (26 kW)
- Propellers: 2-bladed fixed-pitch propeller
- Maximum speed: 25 mph (40 km/h, 22 kn)

== Bibliography ==
- Jackson, A.J. Avro Aircraft Since 1908 London: Putnam, 1965.
- Taylor, M.J.H. Jane's Encyclopedia of Aviation London: Studio Editions, 1989, p. 91
- World Aircraft Information Files London: Bright Star. File 889, Sheet 92
