= Alliott Verdon Roe =

English aviation pioneer and manufacturer

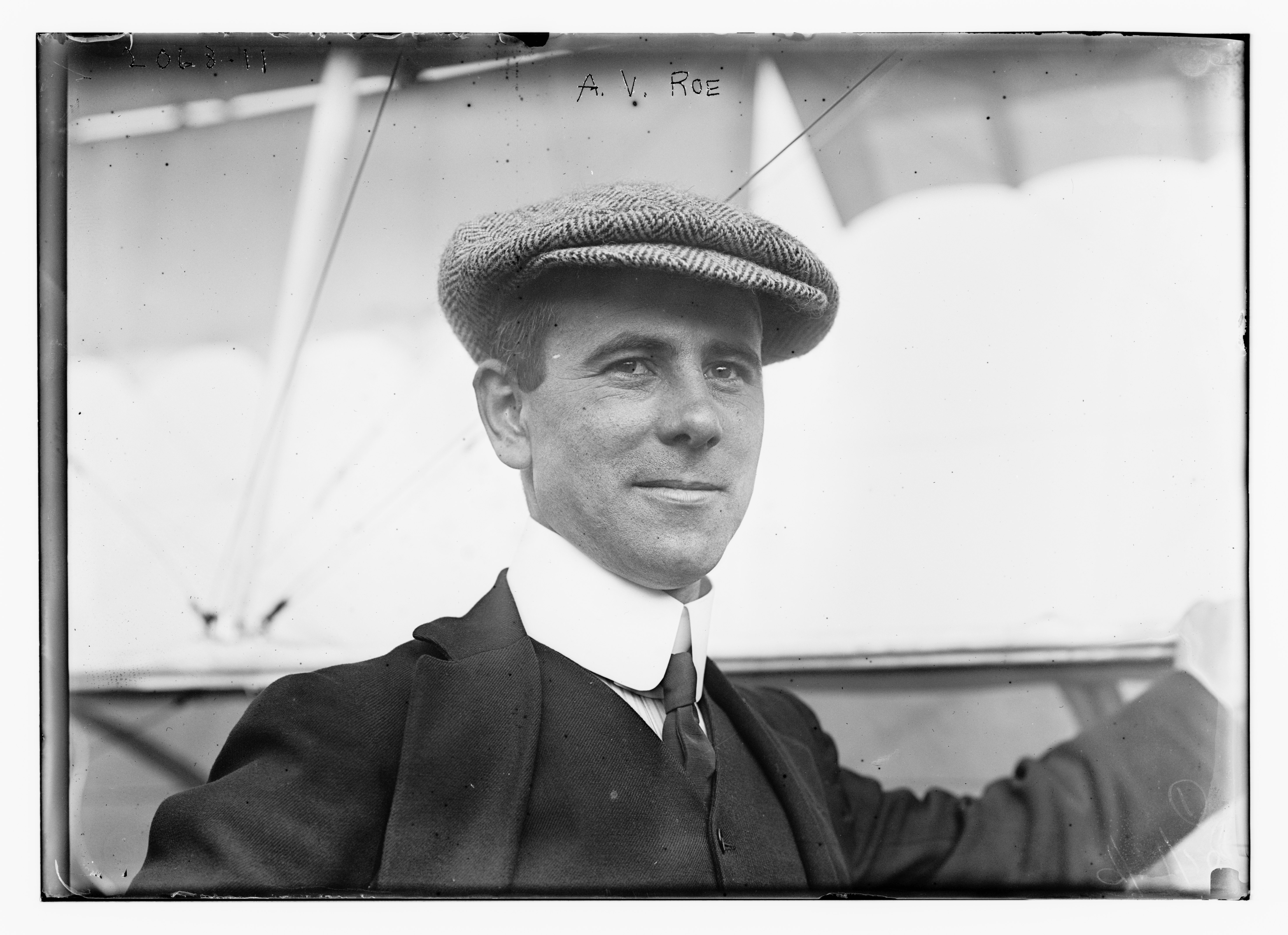
- Alliott Verdon-Roe circa 1910
- Born: Edwin Alliott Verdon Roe; 26 April 1877; Patricroft, Eccles, England
- Died: 4 January 1958 (aged 80); Portsmouth, England
- Resting place: St Andrew's Church, Hamble
- Occupation: Aircraft manufacturer
- Known for: British aviation pioneer
- Relatives: Humphrey Verdon Roe (brother); Harry Stopes-Roe (nephew)

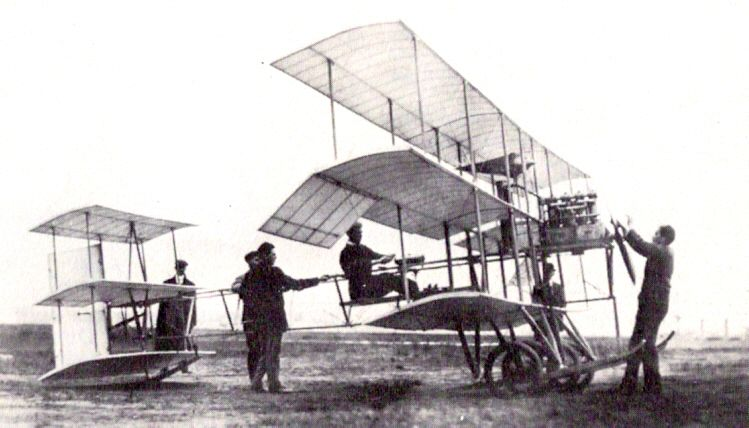
Roe in the cockpit of his Roe III Triplane in September 1910 during his visit to the United States

Sir Edwin Alliott Verdon Roe OBE, Hon. FRAeS, FIAS (26 April 1877 – 4 January 1958) was a pioneer English pilot and aircraft manufacturer, and founder in 1910 of the Avro company. After experimenting with model aeroplanes, he made flight trials in 1907–1908 with a full-size biplane at Brooklands, near Weybridge in Surrey, and officially became the first Englishman to fly an all-British machine a year later, with a triplane, on the Walthamstow Marshes.

== Early life ==
Roe was born in Patricroft, Eccles, Lancashire, the son of Edwin Roe, a doctor, and Annie Verdon. He was the elder brother of Humphrey Verdon Roe. Roe left home when he was 14 to go to Canada where he had been offered training as a surveyor. When he arrived in British Columbia he discovered that a slump in the silver market meant that there was little demand for surveyors, so he spent a year doing odd jobs, then returned to England. There he served as an apprentice with the Lancashire & Yorkshire Railway. He later tried to join the Royal Navy to study marine engineering at King's College London, but, although he passed the technical and mathematics papers, he was rejected for failing some of the general subjects. As well as doing dockyard work, Roe joined the ship SS Jebba of the British & South African Royal Mail Company as fifth engineer on the West African run. He went on to serve on other vessels, finishing his Merchant Navy career as third engineer aboard the SS Ichanga. It was during these voyages that he became interested in the possibility of building a flying machine, having observed the soaring flight of albatrosses.

== Aviation career ==
In 1906 he applied for the job of Secretary of the Royal Aero Club. Although there were other better-qualified candidates, Roe's enthusiasm for aviation impressed Charles Rolls, and Stanley Spooner who interviewed him, and he was given the job. Shortly after this he was offered a job as a draughtsman by G.L.O. Davidson, who had devised a twin-rotored aircraft and had secured the financial backing of Sir William Armstrong of Armstrong-Whitworth. This machine was being built in Denver in the United States. After disagreements about the design of the machine and problems with his salary, Roe, who had been sent back to Britain to deal with patenting the design, resigned.

He then began to build a series of flying models, and won a Daily Mail competition with a prize of £75 for one of his designs in 1907. With the prize money and the use of stables at his brother's house in West Hill, Putney, he then began to build a full-size aeroplane, the Roe I Biplane, based on his winning model. He tested this at Brooklands in 1907–08, later claiming to have made his first successful flight on 8 June 1908. After encountering problems with the management of Brooklands he moved his flight experiments to Walthamstow Marshes, where he rented space under a railway arch at the western end of the viaduct. Despite many setbacks, Roe persisted with his experiments and there is now a blue plaque commemorating his first successful flight (in July 1909) at the site. His aircraft, Avroplane, a triplane, is preserved in London's Science Museum. A working replica of this aircraft was unveiled on 7 June 2008 at the Brooklands Museum in Surrey.

With his brother Humphrey, Alliott founded the A.V. Roe Aircraft Co. on 1 January 1910, later renamed Avro Aircraft, at Brownsfield Mill, Great Ancoats Street, Manchester. His most popular model, the 504, sold more than 8,300 units, mainly to the Royal Flying Corps and later to the Royal Air Force for use by training units. In 1928 he sold his shares and bought S. E. Saunders Co., and formed Saunders-Roe.

== Personal and political life ==
Roe was knighted in 1929. In 1933 he changed his surname to Verdon-Roe by deed poll, adding the hyphen between his last two names in honour of his mother.

He was a member of Oswald Mosley's British Union of Fascists in the 1930s. He was a believer in monetary reform and thought it wrong that banks should be able to create money by "book entry" and charge interest on it when they lent it out. In this respect he shared the same enthusiasm for reform as the American poet Ezra Pound, who also wrote for the Mosley press.

During the Second World War, two of his sons were killed in action while serving with the Royal Air Force. Squadron Leader Eric Alliott Verdon-Roe aged 26, in 1941, and Squadron Leader Lighton Verdon-Roe DFC aged 22, in 1943.

Between 1928 and 1940 Verdon-Roe lived at Hamble House in Hamble-le-Rice, Hampshire.

=== Death and burial ===
Verdon-Roe died on 4 January 1958 at St Mary's Hospital in Portsmouth. and was buried in the churchyard of the parish church of St Andrew in Hamble; there is a commemorative plaque to Roe and his sons inside the church.

=== Legacy ===
On 28 October 2011 a green plaque was unveiled by Wandsworth Council and members of the Verdon-Roe family at the site of Roe's first workshop at West Hill, Putney.

In 1980, Verdon-Roe was inducted into the International Air & Space Hall of Fame at the San Diego Air & Space Museum.

Verdon Roe was the grandfather of professional racing driver Bobby Verdon-Roe.
