= Zirbes =

Zirbes is a surname. Notable people with the surname include:

- Laura Zirbes (1884–1967), American educator
- Maik Zirbes (born 1990), German basketball player

== See also ==
- Zerbes
- Zirbel
