= Zerbe =

Zerbe may refer to:

== Surname ==
The name Zerbe may come from the German town of Zerben.

- Anthony Zerbe (born 1936), American actor
- Chad Zerbe (born 1972), American baseball player
- Christina Zerbe (born 1980), German footballer
- Farran Zerbe (1871–1949), American numismatist
- Hannes Zerbe (born 1941), German jazz musician
- James Slough Zerbe (1849–1921), American inventor, early airplane designer
- Jerome Zerbe (1904-1988), American photographer
- Karl Zerbe (1903–1972), German-American painter
- Volker Zerbe (born 1968), German handball player and manager

== Places ==
- Zerbe Township, Pennsylvania, town in central Pennsylvania
- Zerbe Run, stream in central Pennsylvania

== Other ==
- Zerbe Air Sedan, passenger aircraft project
- Zerbe Sextuplane, an early aircraft design
- The ANA Distinguished Service Award, formerly called the Farran Zerbe Memorial Award

== See also ==
- Zerbes (disambiguation)
