= Naglo D.II =

German quadruplane fighter aircraft

D.II
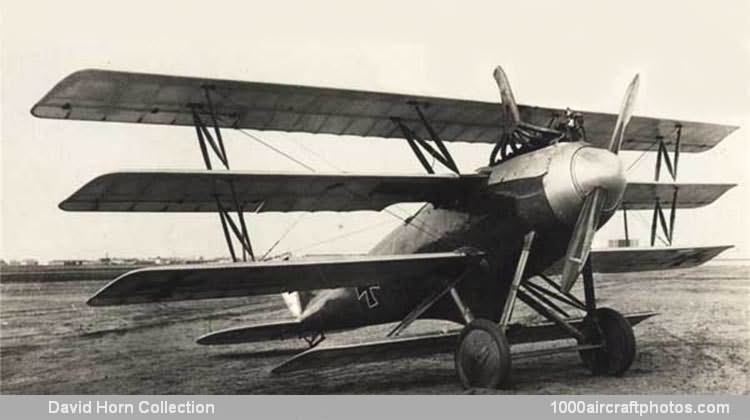

General information
- Type: Single seat quadruplane fighter aircraft
- National origin: Germany
- Manufacturer: Naglo Bootswerft
- Designer: Gnädig
- Number built: 1

History
- First flight: before May 1918

The Naglo D.II was a German single seat quadruplane fighter, flown late in World War I. It took part in one of the fighter competitions but did not reach production.

== Design and development ==
The D.II was the only fighter built by Naglo but it was designed by Ing. Gnädig, who at the time was an employee of Albatros Flugzeugwerke and it partly reflected their practice. It was, though, one of the few quadruplanes of World War I. The three upper wings were all similar, having constant chord, squared tips, no sweep and the same span. The lowest of these was attached to the lower fuselage, the middle one to the upper fuselage with a cutout for downward vision. Inboard N-form interplane struts held the upper plane high over the fuselage in place of a cabane. Outboard there was one more N-interplane strut between each wing, four in all. Ailerons were fitted on all three upper wings. The fourth wing, lowest of all, was quite different, much shorter in span. It was mounted independently of the other three, fixed to a dorsal keel extension and braced on each side with a V-strut from about mid-span to the root of the wing above. When the aircraft was parked, the wing was close to the ground and not far behind the undercarriage wheels.

The D.II was powered by a 160 hp (120 kW) Mercedes six-cylinder water-cooled engine, driving a two-blade propeller with a large, domed spinner which was blended into the round, converging contours of the fuselage. The engine's cylinder heads and exhausts were exposed above the fuselage, which overall appeared similar to that of the Albatros D.V and may have been based upon it. The D.II had a fixed, single axle conventional undercarriage, the axle fixed to the lower fuselage with a pair of V-struts, and with a tailskid at the rear.

The first flight occurred before 24 May 1918 when the D.II was type tested. It took part in the second D-type contest at Adlershof in mid-1918 and received complimentary comments on its build quality. A need to improve flight characteristics was noted; Naglo was therefore asked to present the D.II for further tests after making modifications.

== Specifications ==
Data from Green and Swanborough

General characteristics

- Crew: One
- Wingspan: 9.00 m (29 ft 6 in)
- Wing area: 22.40 m^{2} (241.1 sq ft)
- Empty weight: 724 kg (1,596 lb)
- Gross weight: 914 kg (2,015 lb)
- Powerplant: 1 × Mercedes D.III 6-cylinder in-line water-cooled piston engine, 120 kW (160 hp)
- Propellers: 2-bladed wooden propeller

Armament

- 2×LMG 08/15 fixed machine guns

== See also ==
Aircraft of comparable role, configuration, and era

- Armstrong Whitworth F.K.10
- Wight Quadruplane
