= Blohm & Voss P 193 =

P 193

General information
- Type: Dive bomber and ground-attack
- Manufacturer: Blohm & Voss
- Designer: Richard Vogt
- Status: Design project

The Blohm & Voss P 193 was a design study for a dive bomber/ground attack aircraft intended to replace the Junkers Ju 87.

Its single-engine pusher design featured a variable-incidence wing, which could rotate for takeoff without risking ground impact by the pusher propeller at the rear.

== History ==
Through the Spring of 1944 the Blohm & Voss design team under Richard Vogt studied a series of design configurations for a "Stuka" dive bomber and ground-attack aircraft, with a view to replacing the ageing Junkers Ju 87 and relieving the demand on the Focke-Wulf Fw 190, which was being pressed into the role as a temporary stopgap. Ultimately, none of the competing designs would be produced and the Fw 190 was replaced in the ground-attack role by the Messerschmitt Me 262 jet fighter.

Among the first of these was the P 193. Others, studied either in parallel or shortly afterwards, included the P 192, P 194 and P 196.

Although its estimated top speed of 640 kilometres per hour (398 mph) at 7,120 metres (23,360 ft) was faster than the P 102, the rate of climb of the P 193 proved inadequate and the design was dropped.

== Design ==
The P 193 was of pusher layout with a deep ventral fin to protect the rear-mounted propeller from ground impact, but was otherwise conventional in appearance. The pilot was seated well forward, giving an excellent vision, while the Junkers Jumo 213A engine, rated at 1,330 kilowatts (1,780 hp), was mid-mounted and drove the propeller through a long extension shaft.

In order to obtain the necessary rotation for takeoff, the incidence of the main wing could be increased, similar to the earlier Bv 144 transport prototype then under construction in France.

Despite its difference from the even more radical P 192, studied in parallel, the two designs shared many of the same wing, forward fuselage, tricycle undercarriage and armament components.

It had a wing span of 11.4 metres (37 ft 5 in) and length of 10.3 metres (33 ft 10 in).
