= Blohm & Voss P 192 =

P 192

General information
- Type: Dive bomber and ground-attack
- Manufacturer: Blohm & Voss
- Designer: Richard Vogt
- Status: Design project

The Blohm & Voss P 192 was a design study for a dive bomber/ground attack aircraft intended to replace the Junkers Ju 87.

Its radical design featured a three-surface wing configuration, with the single propeller installed mid-fuselage between the fore and main wings.

== History ==
Through the Spring of 1944 the Blohm & Voss design team under Richard Vogt studied a series of design configurations for a "Stuka" dive bomber and ground-attack aircraft, with a view to replacing the ageing Junkers Ju 87 and relieving the demand on the Focke-Wulf Fw 190, which was being pressed into the role as a temporary stopgap. Ultimately, none of the competing designs would be produced and the Fw 190 was replaced in the ground-attack role by the Messerschmitt Me 262 jet fighter.

The first of these was the P 192. Others, studied either in parallel or shortly afterwards, included the P 193, P 194 and P 196.

Estimated performance of the P 192 was disappointing and the design was dropped.

== Design ==
Vogt's radical design included a propeller mounted part way back along the fuselage, which was of tubular cross-section and shared a common axis so that the propeller appeared to cut it in half. The engine was placed immediately behind the propeller, while the forward fuselage accommodated the pilot and retractable nosewheel.

In order to provide sufficient structural stiffness, a small fore wing was mid-mounted on the front section and short tip booms ran back on either side of the propeller to brace the forward section against the main wing, also mid-mounted. A conventional tail was also fitted, making it a three-surface aircraft.

The main wing was straight, with a heavily tapered trailing edge, and airflow for the engine cooling radiators entered through long, narrow leading edge slits inboard of the booms.

Armament comprised two 20 mm MG 151 machine guns in the nose section and two 30 mm MK 108 cannon in the side booms. External provision was made for carrying a single 500 kilograms (1,100 lb) bomb beneath the fuselage.

Two options were studied, the P 192.01 powered by a Daimler-Benz DB 603G and the P 192.02 powered by a Junkers Jumo 213A, both engines being liquid-cooled inverted V12 types.

The P 192.01 had a wing span of 13 metres (42 ft 8 in) and a length of 11.7 metres (38 ft 5 in).

The P 192.02 was slightly smaller and had a tapered tailplane, in comparison to the P.01 with a constant-chord tail.
