= Multiplane =

Multiplane can refer to:

- Multiplane camera, a motion-picture camera used in the traditional animation process
- Multiplane (aeronautics), a fixed-wing aircraft-configuration featuring multiple wing planes
