= Miel =

Miel may refer to:

- Miel (Swisttal), a village in Germany
- Miel Bredouw (born 1989), American comedian and musician
- Alice Miel (1906–1998), American educator and author
- Jan Miel (1599–1663), Flemish painter
- Movimiento Independiente Euro Latino, Spanish political party
- "Miel", a song by Arca from Arca

== See also ==
- Café miel, a flavored coffee drink
