= Zirbel =

Zirbel is a surname. Notable people with the surname include:

- Frank Joseph Zirbel (born 1947), American musician, composer, filmmaker and artist
- Tom Zirbel (born 1978), American cyclist

== See also ==
- Zirbes
