= Variable-incidence wing =

Aircraft mechanism aiding in landing

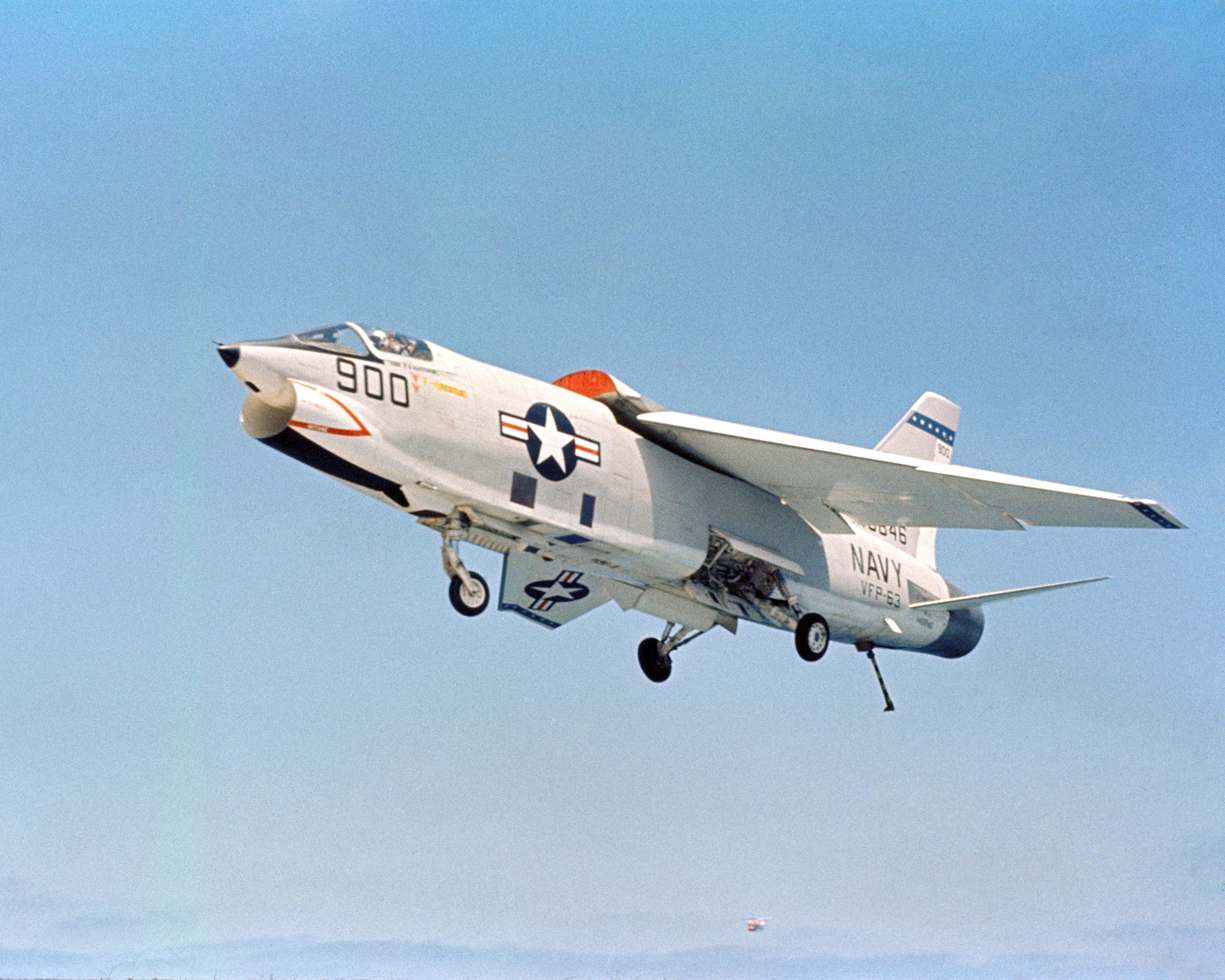
An RF-8 Crusader using its variable-incidence wing during a landing approach

A variable-incidence wing has an adjustable angle of incidence relative to its fuselage. This allows the wing to operate at a high angle of attack for take-off and landing while allowing the fuselage to remain close to horizontal.

The pivot mechanism adds extra weight over a conventional wing and increases costs, but in some applications the benefits can outweigh the costs.

Several examples have flown, with one, the F-8 Crusader carrier-borne jet fighter, entering production.

== History ==
Some early aeroplanes had wings which could be varied in incidence for control and trim, in place of conventional elevator control surfaces. Wing warping varied the incidence of the outer wing and was used by several pioneers, including initially the Wright brothers.

Early examples of rigid variable-incidence wings were not particularly successful. They include the Mulliner Knyplane in 1911, the Ratmanoff monoplane in 1913 and the Paul Schmidt biplane, also in 1913. A patent for a rigid variable-incidence wing was lodged in France on 20 May 1912 by Bulgarian inventor George Boginoff. It is believed that four unsuccessful Russian types were built between 1916 and 1917. The Zerbe Air Sedan was a tandem quadruplane which flew only once, in 1921.

The first example to be made in any quantity was the French tandem-wing Mignet Pou du Ciel (Flying Flea), which became briefly popular during the 1930s. It had a variable-incidence forewing which proved unsafe, and sales were discontinued following a series of fatal crashes.

During World War II, the German company Blohm & Voss developed the variable-incidence monoplane to provide increased lift at takeoff, where the rear fuselage was too close to the ground to allow rotation of the whole aircraft. The fuselage of the BV 144 prototype transport sat low on a short undercarriage, allowing passengers to go on and off without the need for additional steps. Another proposal by B&V, the P 193 attack aircraft, was of pusher configuration and could not rotate its fuselage for takeoff without the propeller fouling the ground, so it was given a variable-incidence wing. Russian designer S. G. Kozlov designed the EI variable-incidence fighter, but the unfinished prototype was destroyed when the factory was overrun by Germany in 1941.

Carrier-borne aircraft must have good forward visibility during the descent and approach for a deck landing. Without a variable-incidence wing (or other high-lift device), the pilot must pitch up the entire aircraft to maintain lift at the slow approach speed required, and this can restrict forward vision. By increasing the incidence of the wing but not the fuselage, both high lift and good forward vision can be maintained. The device also avoids the need for a long, bulky and heavy nose undercarriage to raise the angle of attack at takeoff. The Supermarine Type 322 prototype flew in 1943, and the Seagull ASR.1 amphibian flying boat in 1948.

After the war the USA revisited the idea for the jet age. The Martin XB-51 bomber and the Republic XF-91 interceptor adopted variable incidence for much the same reason as B&V. Both first flew in 1949, but only a handful of prototypes of either was built. They were followed in 1955 by the Vought F-8 Crusader carrier-borne jet fighter, the only variable-incidence type to go into production and enjoy a successful service career.

== See also ==
- Stabilator - a variable-incidence horizontal stabilizer or tailplane.
- Tiltwing - a type of vertical takeoff plane which tilts its wings and engines.
- Variable camber wing - in which the aerofoil profile is changed rather than tilted.
