= Blohm & Voss P 194 =

German WWII military bomber design

P 194
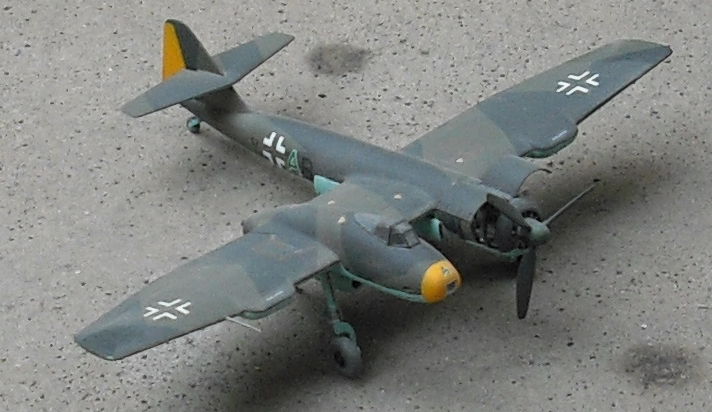
- Model of a P 194.02

General information
- Type: Tactical bomber
- National origin: Germany
- Manufacturer: Blohm & Voss
- Designer: Richard Vogt
- Status: Unrealised project

The Blohm & Voss P 194 was a German design for a mixed-power Stuka or ground-attack aircraft and tactical bomber, during World War II.

== History ==
Along with the P 192, P 193, and P 196, the P 194 was one of four designs Blohm & Voss submitted in response to a requirement issued by the RLM in February 1944 for a stuka or ground-attack aircraft and tactical bomber to replace the Junkers Ju 87.

In the event, the RLM decided not to go ahead with a new aircraft but instead to adapt the existing Messerschmitt Me 262 jet fighter to the tactical bomber role.

== Design ==
Like several other designs by Richard Vogt, the P 194 featured an asymmetric arrangement. The layout was broadly similar to that of the BV 141: the crew and weapons were carried in a large nacelle offset from the main fuselage structure that carried a propeller-driven engine in the nose and the empennage at the rear, joined by a common wing. However, in the P 194, a turbojet was added low down at the rear of the crew nacelle and the thrust from this engine was intended to help balance the thrust from the propeller.

A powerful cluster of guns was to be located in the nose of the nacelle, clear of the propeller, and a bombload of up to 500 kg (1,100 lb) was to be carried in an internal bomb bay in the fuselage.

Using a high proportion of steel in its structure, the design of the P 194 was simplified by using a significant number of parts from other projects, notably the BV 155 prototype and earlier BV 237 asymmetric stuka proposal.

=== Variants ===
P 194.00-101
version with 16 m (52 ft) wingspan and jet air intake under cockpit pod
P 194.01-02
version with 15.3 m (50.2 ft) wingspan, bubble canopy and jet intake under cockpit pod
P 194.02-01
as above, but with turbojet located beneath cockpit
P 194.03-01
as P 194.01-02, but with jet intakes located in the wing roots at the sides of the cockpit pod.

== Specifications (P 194-01, as designed) ==
Data from

General characteristics

- Crew: 1
- Length: 12.1 m (39 ft 8 in)
- Wingspan: 15.3 m (50 ft 2 in)
- Height: 3.7 m (12 ft 2 in)
- Wing area: 36.4 m^{2} (392 sq ft)
- Empty weight: 6,500 kg (14,330 lb)
- Gross weight: 9,350 kg (20,613 lb)
- Powerplant: 1 × BMW 801D 14-cyl. air-cooled radial piston engine, 1,200 kW (1,600 hp)
- Powerplant: 1 × Junkers Jumo 109-004 axial flow turbojet engine, 8.7 kN (2,000 lbf) thrust

Performance

- Maximum speed: 775 km/h (482 mph, 418 kn)
- Range: 1,070 km (660 mi, 580 nmi)
- Service ceiling: 11,100 m (36,400 ft)

Armament

- Guns: 2 × fixed, forward-firing 30 mm (1.181 in) MK 103 cannon
- 2 × fixed, forward-firing 20 mm (0.787 in) MG 151/20 cannon
- Bombs: 500 kg (1,100 lb) of bombs in an internal bomb-bay
