= James Slough Zerbe =

American inventor (1849–1921)

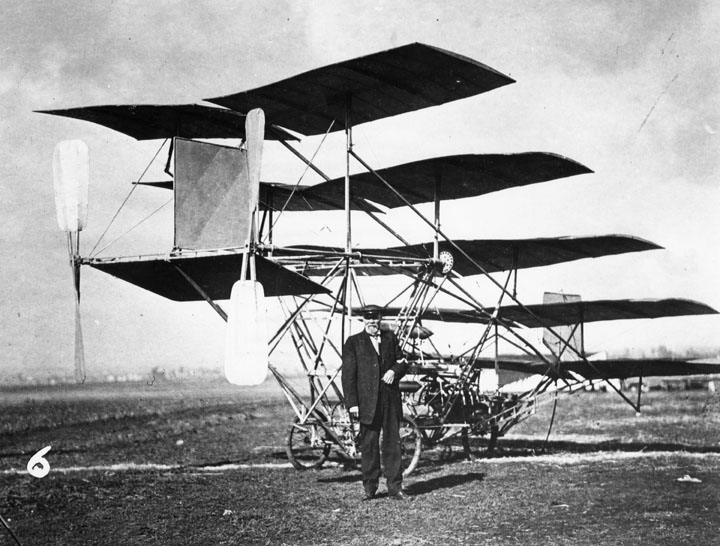
- James Slough Zerbe (1910) and the Zerbe Quintaplane (or "Multi-plane")
- Born: Jerome Slough Zerbe; September 18, 1849; Womelsdorf, Pennsylvania, U.S.
- Died: February 8, 1921 (aged 71); Queens, New York City, U.S.
- Other name: J. S. Zerbe
- Education: Heidelberg University
- Occupations: Inventor, early aircraft builder, mechanical engineer, electrical engineer, author
- Spouse: Elizabeth Bailey (m. 1871)
- Children: 6
- Relatives: Anthony Zerbe (great grandchild)

James Slough Zerbe (September 18, 1849 – February 8, 1921) was an American inventor, early aircraft builder, mechanical engineer, electrical engineer, and author. He designed planes with multiple wings, including the Zerbe Sextuplane and the Zerbe Air Sedan. Zerbe wrote a series of instructional books for boys on subjects like carpentry, automobiles, electricity, and "aeroplanes"; and also wrote an adventure and travel books. He lived in Ohio, New York City, and later California.

== Early life and education ==
James Slough Zerbe was born on September 18, 1849, in Womelsdorf, Pennsylvania. He attended Heidelberg University in Tiffin, Ohio. In 1871, Zerbe married Elizabeth Bailey, of London.

== Career ==
Zerbe was the president of the Inventors of America in 1884 in Cincinnati, Ohio. He was the manager of the American Patent Agency in 1887 in New York City.

Granville Woods, a mechanical and electrical engineer, who was African American, partnered with Zerbe on developing a simple electric railway. Zerbe joined a partnership with Granville Woods, his son Arthur Zerbe, Henry Keim (investor), and Calvin Bowen (investor and local preacher), and together they founded the American Engineering Company in New York City. James Zerbe served as the patent attorney and manager for the American Engineering Company. Woods accused Zerbe of theft of intellectual property of the designs; and Heim later accused Zerbe of illegal conversion of stocks. Litigation for both resulted in the 1890s. By 1893, Zerbe was a prisoner at the Ludlow Street Jail.

== California and late life ==
Zerbe and his family moved to California in late life. After the 1906 San Francisco earthquake and fire, Zerbe designed and installed an electric water purification system for the city. He was a founding member of the Aeronautical Club for California.

Zerbe designed planes with multiple wings, including the Zerbe Sextuplane (c. 1908), and the Zerbe Air Sedan (1918). He attended the 1910 Los Angeles International Air Meet at Dominguez Field, with his so-called "Multi-plane" (also known as the Zerbe Quintaplane).

In 1912, Zerbe and Gorham Tufts Jr., a Californian convicted criminal and cult leader from Fort Worth, Texas, shared a patent registration together for the General Equipment Company.

In 1916, his address was listed as 321 West 55th Street in New York City. He had moved back to New York for radium treatments for prostate cancer. Zerbe died on February 8, 1921, at Booth Memorial Hospital in Queens, New York City.

== Publications ==
- Zerbe, J. S. (1914). "Practical Mechanics for Boys, in language which every boy can understand, and so arranged that he may readily carry out any work from the instructions given, with many original illustrations". New York City, New York: The New York Book Company – via HathiTrust.
- Zerbe, J. S. (1914). "Carpentry for Boys, in Simple Language". New York City, New York: The New York Book Company – via HathiTrust.
- Zerbe, James Slough (1914). "Electricity for Boys; a working guide, in the successive steps of electricity, described in simple terms, with many original illustrations". New York City, New York: The New York Book Company – via HathiTrust.
- Zerbe, J. S. (1915). Motors. New York City, New York: Cupples & Leon Company – via HathiTrust.
- Zerbe, J. S. (1915). Aeroplanes. New York City, New York: Cupples & Leon Company – via HathiTrust.
- Zerbe, J. S. (1915). Trench-Mates in France: Adventures of Two Boys in the Great War. New York City, New York: Harper & Brothers Publishing.
- Castaways (1912)
- Exploring the Island (1912)
- The Mysterious Caverns (1912)
- The Tribesmen (1912)
- The Capture and Pursuit (1912)
- Conquest of Savages (1912)
- Treasures of Islands (1915)
- Exploring New Islands (1915)

== See also ==
- Zerbe
