= 1910 Los Angeles International Air Meet at Dominguez Field =

Early airport in California, United States

Coordinates: 33.86°N 118.25°W

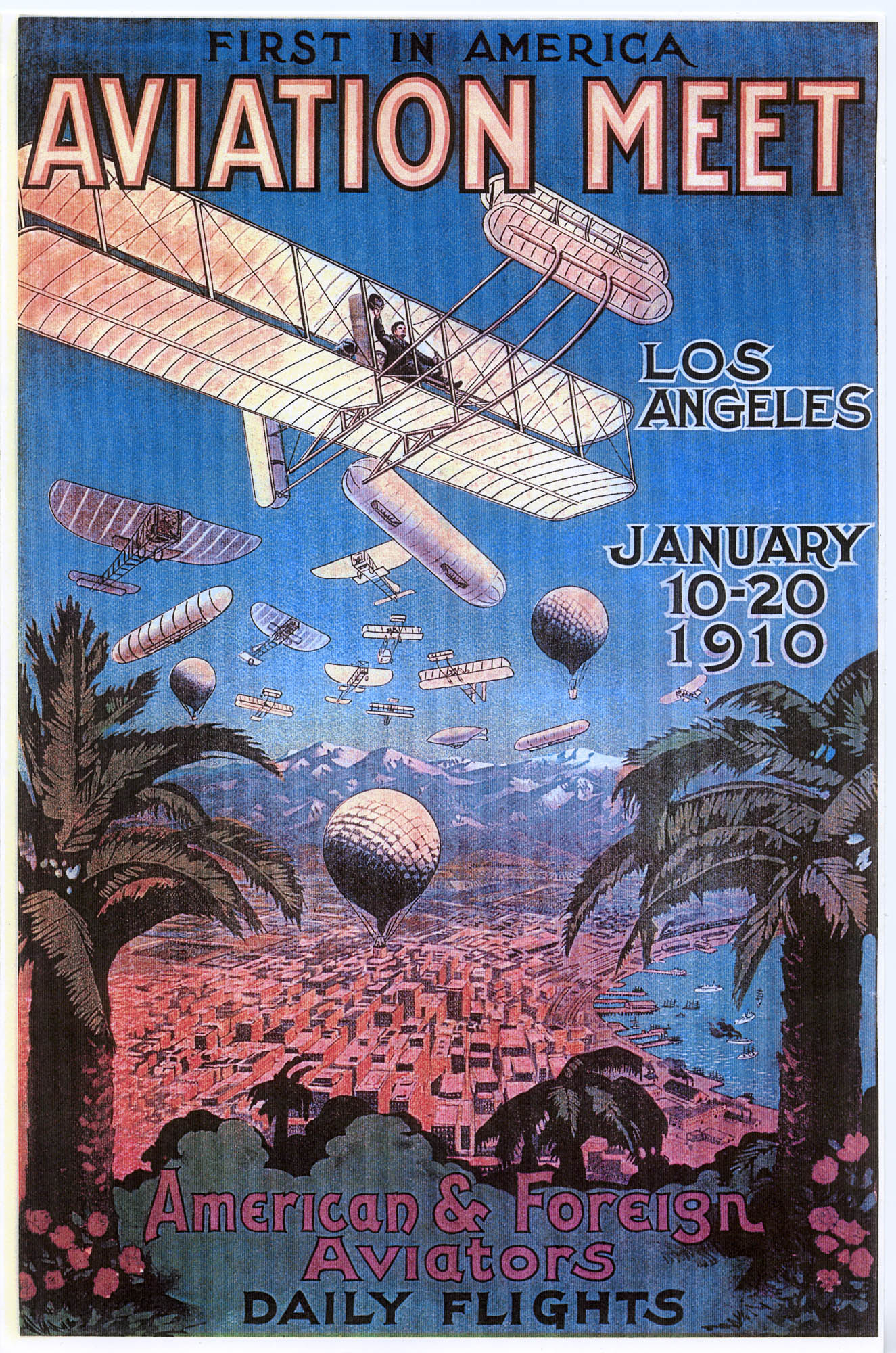
A promotional poster for the meet

The Los Angeles International Air Meet (January 10 to January 20, 1910) was among the earliest airshows in the world and the first major airshow in the United States. It was held in Los Angeles County, California, at Dominguez Field, southwest of the Dominguez Rancho Adobe in present-day Rancho Dominguez, California. Spectator turnout numbered approximately 254,000 over 11 days of ticket sales. The Los Angeles Times called it "one of the greatest public events in the history of the West."

== Early airshows and preparations ==
=== Earliest airshows ===
While it is well documented that Wilbur and Orville Wright first flew on December 17, 1903, the early 1900s saw several competing claims to have made the first practical airplane. The Wrights filed for a patent on their flying machine on March 23, 1903, and Patent Number 821393 is dated May 22, 1906. They moved their flying north east of Dayton to a 100-acre field (40 ha) called Huffman Prairie and continued to develop their aircraft design. The year 1908 saw the Wrights' first publicized demonstration flights.

On August 8, 1908, at the Hunaudières track near Le Mans, France, the Wrights silenced European doubters. In a first demonstration lasting only one minute 45 seconds, Wilbur Wright's effortless banking turns and ability to fly in a circle amazed and stunned onlookers, including several French aviation pioneers, among them Louis Blériot.

Several airshows featuring competitions, aircraft makers, and pilots were held in 1909, including ones at Frankfurt in Germany and Reims, France. The Frankfurt airshow, which began in July 1909 (now named Internationale Luft- und Raumfahrtausstellung (ILA)) claims to be the world's first such multi-participant show. The Grande Semaine d'Aviation in Reims took place during August 1909, and attracted by over half a million spectators. Shortly after the Reims airshow, Charles Willard and A. Roy Knabenshue resolved to stage the first such show in the United States, targeting the winter of 1909 - 1910.

=== Preparations ===
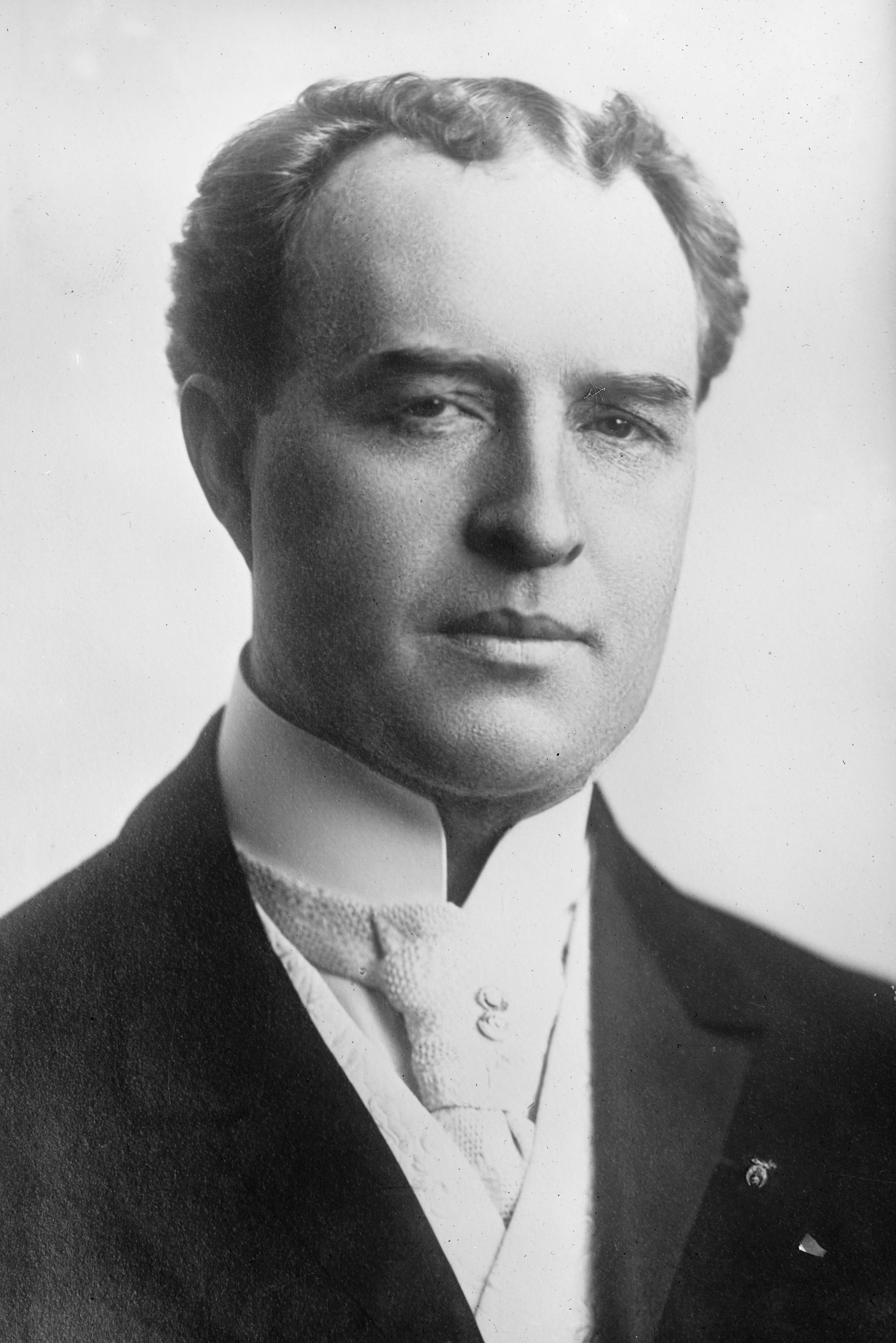
Promoter Dick Ferris

Knabenshue and Willard selected the Los Angeles, California, area for its favorable winter weather. After receiving a promise of participation from Glenn Curtiss, Knabenshue contacted Los Angeles promoter Dick Ferris, who in turn mobilized local businesses and formed an organizing committee.

A field near Santa Anita Park was considered, but physical obstructions such as tall trees led the aviators to search elsewhere. By December 1909, they selected Dominguez Field atop a small hill that had been developed by Manuel Dominguez on land once part of Rancho San Pedro, an early Spanish land grant.

Once the site was finalised, promotion of the meet began and grandstands with a capacity of between 50,000 and 60,000 were erected. An aviators' camp was also constructed nearby. The passenger platform at the local Pacific Electric Railway station was expanded to accommodate visitors to the rural site who might travel from downtown Los Angeles.

Organizers invited pilots of monoplanes, biplanes, balloons, and dirigibles. To reinforce the event's "international" billing, French aviator Louis Paulhan, a notable from the 1909 Reims meet, was invited. Paulhan was guaranteed a small sum of money as encouragement to attend. Cash prizes were allotted for competitive events in altitude, speed, and endurance.

== The event ==
=== Participants ===
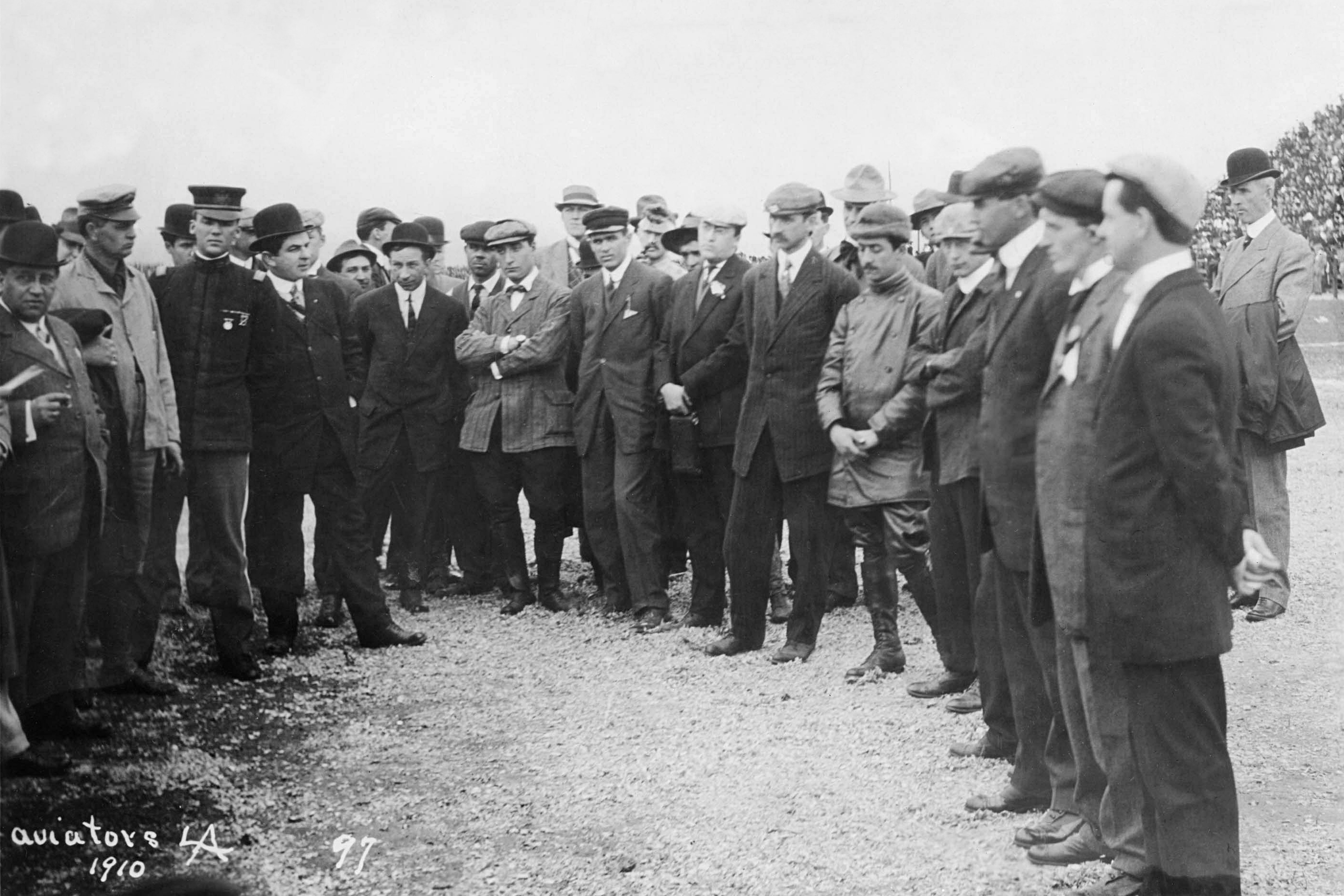
The aviators who took part in the events. Glenn Curtiss and Louis Paulhan can be seen towards the right side.

The 1910 Air Meet drew many famous aviators, most of whom were American. Glenn Curtiss, American aviation pioneer and founder of the Curtiss Aeroplane and Motor Company was the most famous. Other participants included Roy Knabenshue, Charles Willard, Lincoln Beachey and Charles K. Hamilton, Howard Warfield Gill, and Clifford B. Harmon, many of whom are listed among the Early Birds of Aviation. French aviators at the event included Louis Paulhan and Didier Masson.

The Wright brothers did not take part in the event, but were there with their lawyers in an attempt to prevent Paulhan and Curtiss from flying. The Wrights claimed that the ailerons on their aircraft infringed patents. Notwithstanding their allegations, Paulhan and Curtis still made flights.

Paulhan gave William Randolph Hearst his first experience of flight. William Boeing, who had been enthused by the invention of the airplane, was unable to get a ride on any aircraft at the air meet:

While attending the first American Air Meet in Los Angeles, Boeing asked nearly every aviator for a ride, but no one said yes except Louis Paulhan. For three days Boeing waited, but on the 4th day he discovered Paulhan had already left the meet. Possibly, one of the biggest missed opportunities in Paulhan's life was the ride he never gave Boeing.

As part of the larger Wright brothers' patent cases, the Wrights actually won monetary damages in U.S. courts for Paulhan's public performances that day.

==== Local creations ====
In addition to the aviators billed in the event's programs, there were many hobbyists and inventors wishing to make a name for themselves in the new aviation industry. A $1500 prize for a locally designed and built machine that successfully flew helped to ensure a high turn-out from California inventors and would-be aviators. Some of these were close copies or modifications on already successful designs, like the Bleriot monoplane or Curtiss biplane, but some were truly original creations in every sense of the word.

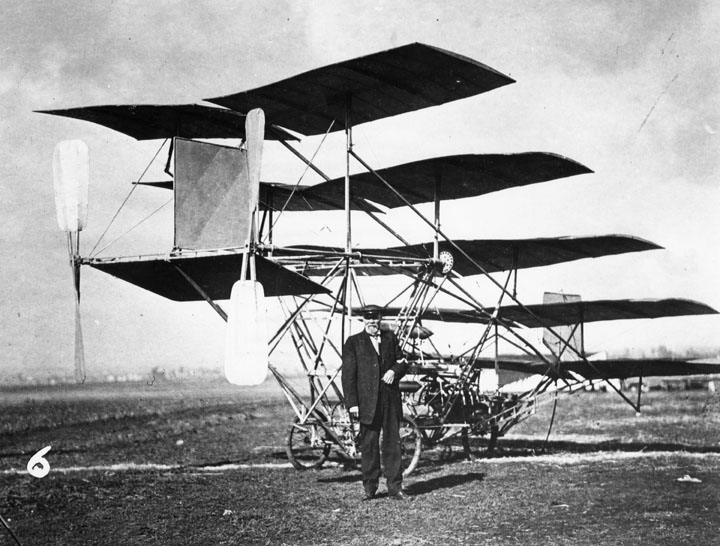
Jerome Slough Zerbe's Multi-plane

One of the more unusual was Los Angeles resident James Slough Zerbe's so-called "Multi-plane," a construction which boasted five separate "planes" of wings attached to an elaborate chassis. His creation hit a hole in the field and collapsed during take-off, ruining several of the wings and making flight impossible.

Zerbe was also responsible for the creation of a "double biplane" for W.J. Davis. This machine consisted of "four decks of equal size, arranged two fore and two aft" and two propellers.

A.E. Mueller, another Los Angeles resident, created an aircraft which was so large for the time that it was dubbed "Mueller’s Monster" by the Los Angeles Times, who stated that it was "by far the largest aeroplane in existence". The plane measured seventy-five feet long by fifty feet wide, had a 600 lb (270 kg)., 50 horsepower (37 kW) engine, and weighed around a ton. Mueller believed that by creating such a heavy machine he would be able to avoid "the necessity of delicate balancing in light wind currents."

J.H. Klassen, also of Los Angeles, constructed a gyroplane for the contest, as well as entering a monoplane. His design, described by the LA Times as "quite novel", consisted of "two 12-foot circular planes in the front, and two 8-foot planes in the rear." Klassen hoped that the "gyroscopic motion of the revolving planes" would aid greatly in the craft's stability in the air.

==== Full list of participants ====
Airplanes

Participant	From	Entry
Glenn Curtiss	Hammondsport, New York	Curtiss Biplane
Louis Paulhan	Paris, France	Farman Biplane & Bleriot Monoplane
Didier Masson	Paris, France	Bleriot Monoplane
Charles E. Miscarol	Paris, France	Bleriot Monoplane
Baroness de la Roche	Paris, France	Bleriot Monoplane
Aero Navigation Company	Girard, Kansas	Aeroplane
Clifford B. Harmon	New York City, New York	Curtiss Biplane
Charles Keeney Hamilton	Hammondsport, New York	Curtiss Biplane
Tom Gunn	San Francisco, California	Biplane Amphibian Seaplane
H. P. Warner	Beloit, Wisconsin	Curtiss Biplane
Pacific Aero Club	San Francisco, California	Monoplane
Grant Fowler (aviator)	Tucson, Arizona	Triplane
Charles Borok	New York	Monoplane
Louis Bergdoll	Philadelphia, Pennsylvania	Bleriot Monoplane
Ralph Saunier	New York	Monoplane
Donald H. Gordon	Bostonia, California	Aeroplane
J. W. Curzon	Cincinnati, Ohio	Farman Biplane
Dana P. Goodwin	San Francisco, California	Monoplane
San Diego Aero Manufacturing Company	San Diego, California	Monoplane
W. M. Williams	Douglas, Arizona	Monoplane
A. Roy Knabenshue	Toledo, Ohio	Aeroplane
Harry La Verne Twining	Los Angeles, California	Ornithopter
J. C. Klassen	Los Angeles, California	Gyroplane & Monoplane
William Stephens	Los Angeles, California	Monoplane
A. L. Smith (aviator)	Los Angeles, California	Biplane
A.J. Gonzales	Los Angeles, California	Bowplane
James Slough Zerbe	Los Angeles, California	Multiplane
H.L. Reimer	Los Angeles, California	Ornithopter
E.S. Smith	Tropico, California	Monoplane
Pacific Aero Club	San Francisco, California	Biplane
La Platt Brothers	Yuma, Arizona	Ornithopter
James A. Liston	San Diego, California	Biplane
S. Y. Beach	New York	Monoplane
H.W. Gale	New York	Aeroplane
B.F. Roerig	San Diego, California	Biplane
G.H. Loose	San Francisco, California	Monoplane
Waldo Dean Waterman	San Diego, California	Biplane
E.J. Campbell	Los Angeles, California	Biplane
W.J. Davis	Los Angeles, California	Double Biplane
D.J. Johnson	Los Angeles, California	Aeroplane
Richard Griffith Vere Mytton	Los Angeles, California	Biplane
Charles Skogland	Los Angeles, California	Monoplane
Charles F. Willard	New York	Curtiss Biplane
Howard Gill	Baltimore, Maryland	Gill-dosh Biplane

=== Attendance ===
An estimated 254,000 tickets were sold, and gate receipts were roughly $137,500. During the time the meet was running, streetcars ran to Dominguez Fields every 2 minutes from the Pacific Electric station in Los Angeles. The great crowd turn-out, averaging more than 20,000 spectators per day, made it possible to return $1.25 to "the subscribers to the aviation fund for every dollar advanced". Probably not the only future-notable person to see the show, 9-year-old Florence Leontine Lowe, later better known as "Pancho" Barnes, was brought by her grandfather, aviation pioneer Thaddeus S. C. Lowe. It was here that she was inspired to begin her own later career in aviation. By the end of the event, the backer announced a profit of $60,000 after disbursing prize money.

=== Competitive events ===
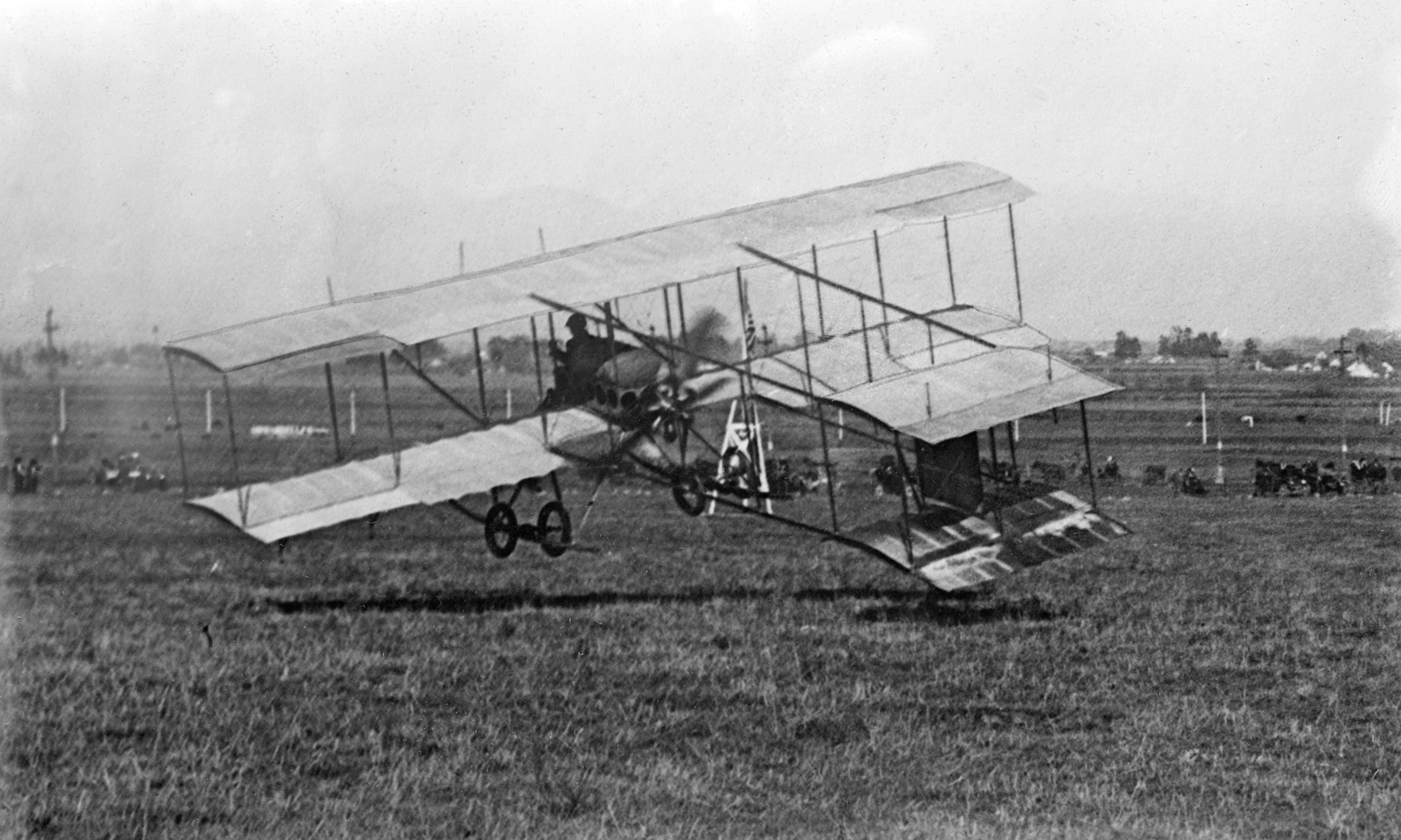
Louis Paulhan at takeoff in a Farman III biplane at the 1910 Los Angeles International Air Meet at Dominguez Field

Aviators competed for the $75,000 in prizes according to a standard procedure. The aviators would first "notify the judges for which prize they [were] about to compete" and then fly around the 1.61-mile (2.59 km) course, always in an anti-clockwise direction. Aviators were informed that they "must not fly over the grand stand or any place where a crowd is assembled without permission of the judges." Violators of this rule were penalised.

All flights taking place between 2 p.m. and sunset counted towards scoring for prizes. Aviators were encouraged to fly as many times per day as possible, and to make as many record attempts in the competitive events as possible. Those contestants who "do not make a flight every day between the hours of two and five o'clock p. m. of one complete circuit of the course in competition for the speed or endurance competitions will be penalized five per cent of their best time for the prize." Only the best time was counted during the judging at the end of the meet.

Ballooning competitions and events were also held in the Los Angeles suburb of Huntington Park throughout the week. These events included attempts to reach a new altitude record and passenger flights.

=== Prizes offered ===
The following prizes were offered at the air meet. All prices are given in 1910 US dollars.

- $10,000.00 for "the machine which, carrying two or more persons, breaks all worlds records for duration, altitude, distance and speed."
- $7,500.00 for "the machine making the best general average in all events."
- $5,000.00 for setting a new height record.
- $5,000.00 for setting a new endurance record.
- $500.00 for "the circuit of least diameter."
- $500.00 for the shortest take-off time.
- $500.00 for the shortest take-off distance.
- $500.00 for the "greatest ability during flight (general average)."
- $500.00 for the longest glide with the motor shut off.
- $500.00 for the "best general average in landing at a given point."
- $1,500.00 for any aircraft which was designed and built by a resident of California, Arizona, or Nevada which was able to fly five miles or more.
- $500.00 for any aircraft which was designed and built by a resident of California, Arizona, or Nevada which was able to fly two miles or more.
- $2,500 for an aircraft that could "soar (not glide) without power save that of the aviator."
- $10,000.00 for a dirigible flight from Los Angeles to San Francisco.
- $5,000.00 for a non-stop dirigible flight with more than two passengers from Los Angeles to San Diego and back.
- $10,000.00 for a balloon flight to the Atlantic Coast without landing.
- $5,000.00 for the first balloon flight to east of the Mississippi River without landing.
- $2,500.00 for breaking Count de la Vaux's long-distance record of 1,193 miles (1,920 km).
- $2,500.00 for the first balloon to land within five miles (8 km) of San Francisco.

=== Prize winners ===
Paulhan dominated the Dominguez meet, winning $19,000 in prize money with the following accomplishments:

- New flight endurance record; carrying a passenger almost 110 miles (177 kilometers) in his Farman III biplane in 1 hour, 49 minutes.
- New altitude mark of approximately 4,164 feet (1,269 m).

He also performed several aerial feats during the week, and carried U.S. Army 1st Lieutenant Paul W. Beck aloft on January 19 for one of the first tests of aerial bomb-dropping.

Glenn Curtiss set a new air speed record of approximately 55 miles per hour (89 kilometers per hour), and took home the prize for the best quick start. In all, he won approximately $6,500.

== Legacy ==
The site of Dominguez Field became a California Historical Landmark (No. 718) on Dec. 2, 1959. The commemorative plaque near the site reads:

About one half mile southeast of this spot, on Dominguez Hill in historic Rancho San Pedro, the first air meet in the United States was held during January 10–20, 1910. Subsequently, this area has evolved into one of the world's leading aviation-industrial centers.

== See also ==
- California Historical Landmarks in Los Angeles County
