= Besson H-5 =

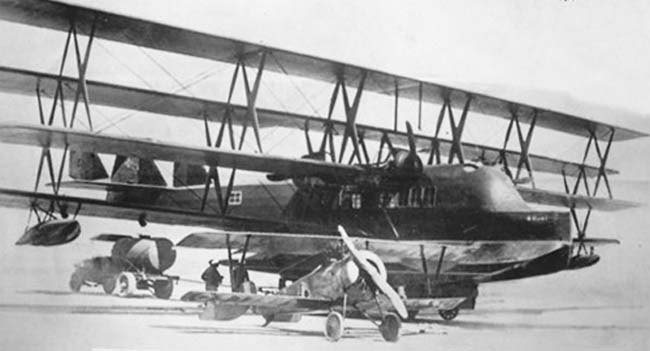
- Besson H-5 circa 1922

General information
- Type: Transport flying-boat
- National origin: France
- Manufacturer: Marcel Besson
- Number built: 1

History
- First flight: 1922

The Besson H-5 (or sometimes Besson MB-11) was a French transport quadruplane flying boat designed by the Marcel Besson company of Boulogne. The only H-5 was damaged and development was abandoned.

== Development ==
The HB.5 (MB-10) originally started development as an open-sea reconnaissance/bombing flying-boat, but it was completed as a 20-seat passenger transport flying-boat. Described as grotesque it had two sets of staggered biplane wings with an unusual X-type bracing and a biplane tail with triple fins and rudders. Powered by four Salmson 9Z radial engines that were located in tandem pairs in line with the third mainplane. The H-5 had a conventional fuselage on a three-ply mahogany boat hull, which had 24 watertight compartments.

The H-5 was tested from the St Raphael naval air station in 1922 and proved to be stable with little vibration. After a few test flights the H-5 was accidentally damaged and development was abandoned.

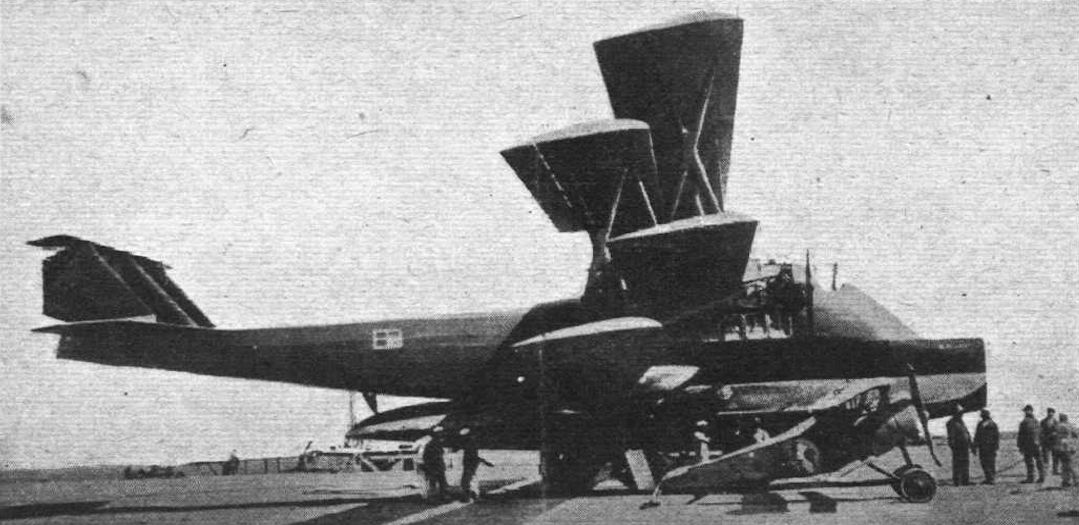
Staggered wing detail

== Specifications ==
Data from The Illustrated Encyclopedia of Aircraft, Jane's all the World's Aircraft 1924

General characteristics

- Crew: 5
- Capacity: 20 passengers
- Length: 22.0 m (72 ft 2 in)
- Wingspan: 29.00 m (95 ft 2 in)
- Height: 6.5 m (21 ft 4 in)
- Wing area: 255 m^{2} (2,740 sq ft)
- Empty weight: 5,500 kg (12,125 lb)
- Max takeoff weight: 10,000 kg (22,046 lb)
- Fuel capacity: 1,800 L (480 US gal; 400 imp gal)
- Powerplant: 4 × Salmson 9Z water-cooled radial piston engine, 190 kW (260 hp) each
- Propellers: 2-bladed fixed-pitch tractor and pusher propellers

Performance

- Maximum speed: 168 km/h (104 mph, 91 kn)
- Range: 900 km (560 mi, 490 nmi)
- Service ceiling: 3,500 m (11,500 ft)

== See also ==
Related lists

- List of flying boats and floatplanes
