= Alice Miel =

American educator and author (1906–1998)

Alice Miel (February 21, 1906 – January 31, 1998) was an American educator and writer of The Shortchanged Children of Suburbia, a study that has been characterized as a “groundbreaking” study in its publicized stress on what suburban schools failed to teach about human differences and cultural diversity. She was also greatly known as a social educator and curriculum development scholar.

== Life and career ==
Miel was born in Six Lakes, Michigan, where she grew up. In 1928, she graduated from the University of Michigan. Three years following her graduation she received her master's. From that point in her life, she went on the get her doctorate in education at Teachers College, Columbia University in 1944.

Miel focused on the democratic social learning environment of children in schools. She supported democratic ideals and the development of democratic behavior as the ultimate goal of schooling. She was one of the first to apply social learning theories, democratic principles, and processes to various areas of curriculum development and school administration. Miel believed social learning should be taught throughout the day not just one subject area. She also believed the teacher was the most important factor in curriculum change and reform would fail if all the people carrying them out were not included. Miel believed it was important to include social issues in the curriculum and was interested in issues of equity and diversity.

Although her ideas were well thought through, they were not received very well at the time for many reasons. They include: 1. People thought in terms of discrete subject areas. 2. She published "More Than Social Studies" in a time where American education was considered soft and in dire need of more math and science. The focus on math and science was increased even more by The National Defense Act which linked federal support to a national policy objective. 3. Finally, 3. Alice Miel lacked affiliation with social studies traditionalists and was not considered an expert or specialist in any of the social sciences.

She had become a teacher at the height of the Progressive Movement in education and it became a strong undercurrent in her life. Miel's career started at Tappan Junior High School in Ann Arbor, Michigan where she began teaching Social Studies and Latin in elementary and secondary schools. While teaching at Ann Arbor she benefited from an educational environment in which local school faculty and students could practice the democratic skills of deliberation and decision-making. She later became the principal. An early landmark in Alice's life was in 1936 when she had a study session at Ohio State University with Laura Zirbes, a prominent figure in the field of elementary education. Miel left this meeting with an obligation to understanding children, not just content, and to providing for their individual differences. In 1945, Miel was appointed a professor at Teachers College and staff researcher at the Horace Mann-Lincoln Institute of school experimentation. Miel was an early president of the Association for Supervision and Curriculum Development from 1953-1954. In 1960, she took charge of the college's department of curriculum and teaching. While in the department, Miel encouraged the development of a curriculum that allows teachers to apply concepts from organized knowledge to the solution of social problems. She remained at Teachers College for three decades. In 1967, Dr. Miel wrote the book, The Shortchanged Children of Suburbia. The book focused on how the public schools were preparing children for a world filled with men and women of different races, religions, and economic backgrounds. She surveyed children and their attitudes toward themselves, their families, and their neighborhoods in rural, urban, and suburban areas. She found suburban children to be limited and isolated from people whom where different from themselves. She also found prejudices toward people of different races and religions deeply ingrained in the children. Lastly, she found parents and teachers were more likely to ignore or avoid racial differences. She struggled to teach people to "Take a walk around yourself", meaning that people should reflect inwardly before superficially judging human differences. Also, she thought educators should branch out and teach children about other people and various social problems. Miel received the National Education Association's Human Rights Award in 1968 for the publication of her book. In 1970 Miel helped found the World Council on Curriculum and Instruction. Dr. Miel retired from the Teacher College in 1971.

Miel made many efforts to promote democratic leadership and decision-making among educators and to enhance the capacity of schools for change and self-renewal. She developed a knowledge base of factors that affect schools' capacity for change, used cooperative action research to help school systems plan research-based instructional innovations, worked to influence and involve a variety of members in the community to make decisions affecting their schools, and developed models of school change in her curriculum development research.

== Death ==
After many achievements, on January 31, 1998 Dr. Miel died at the age of 91. As a professor of education and an author who focused on curriculum development, Dr. Miel taught and left her impression on the subject matter throughout the country and around the world.

== Publications ==
- Changing the curriculum, a social process, 1946
- Cooperative procedures in learning, 1952
- More than social studies; a view of social learning in the elementary school, 1957
- Individualizing reading practices, 1958
- Creativity in teaching: invitations and instances, 1961
- The shortchanged children of suburbia; what schools don't teach about human differences and what can be done about it, 1967

== Sources ==
- New York Times Archives
- Education Encyclopedia
- Encyclopedia of Education Second Ed. Vol. 5
- "Bending the Future to Their Will" by Margaret Crocco and Ozro Luke Davis
- "Addressing Social Issues in the Classroom and Beyond" by Samuel Totten and Jon E. Pedersen
