= Horatio Frederick Phillips =

English aviation pioneer

Horatio Frederick Phillips (1845 – 1924) was an English aviation pioneer, born in Streatham, Surrey. He was famous for building multiplane flying machines with many more sets of lifting surfaces than are normal on modern aircraft. However he made a more lasting contribution to aeronautics in his work on aerofoil design.

== Aerofoils ==
Phillips devised a wind tunnel in which he studied a wide variety of aerofoil shapes for use in providing lift. The tunnel was unusual in that the gas flow was provided by steam rather than air.

By 1884 he was able to register his first patent, and more were to follow. He demonstrated the truth of George Cayley's idea that giving the upper surface greater curvature than the lower accelerates the upper airflow, reducing pressure above the wing and so creating lift.

== Multiplane flying machines ==
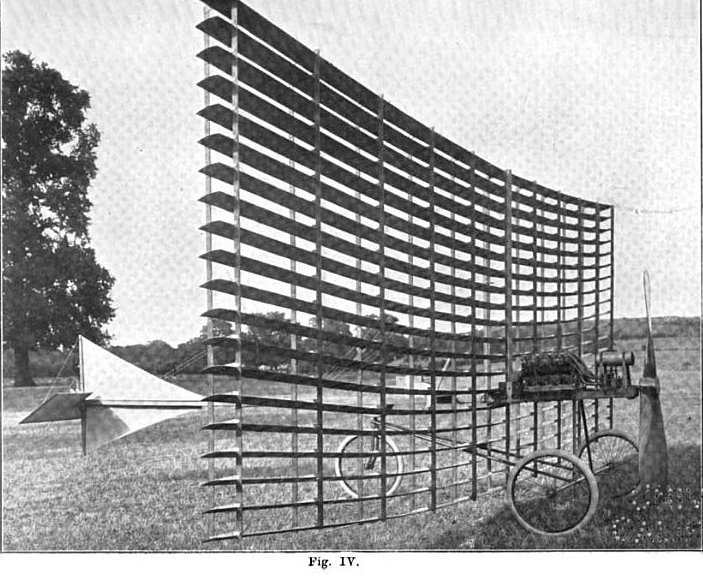
1904 Flying Machine

Phillips believed that multiple stacked wing planes (or "sustainers" as he called them), in "Venetian blind" configuration, offered advantages.

- His 1893 Flying Machine had 50 lifting surfaces and used his patented "double-surface airfoils" in such a way as to produce an aspect ratio of 1:152, providing great lift at the sacrifice of stability. As a test vehicle, it was not designed to be manned, but was used to test lifting capability. Its maximum load was found to be 400 lb (180 kg).
- His 1904 Multiplane was a development of the 1893 test vehicle in a configuration that could be flown by a person. It had 21 wings and had a tail for stability, but was unable to achieve sustained flight. Its best performance was 50 ft (15 m). A specially made replica of the 1904 machine appears in the opening sequences of the 1965 film Those Magnificent Men in their Flying Machines.

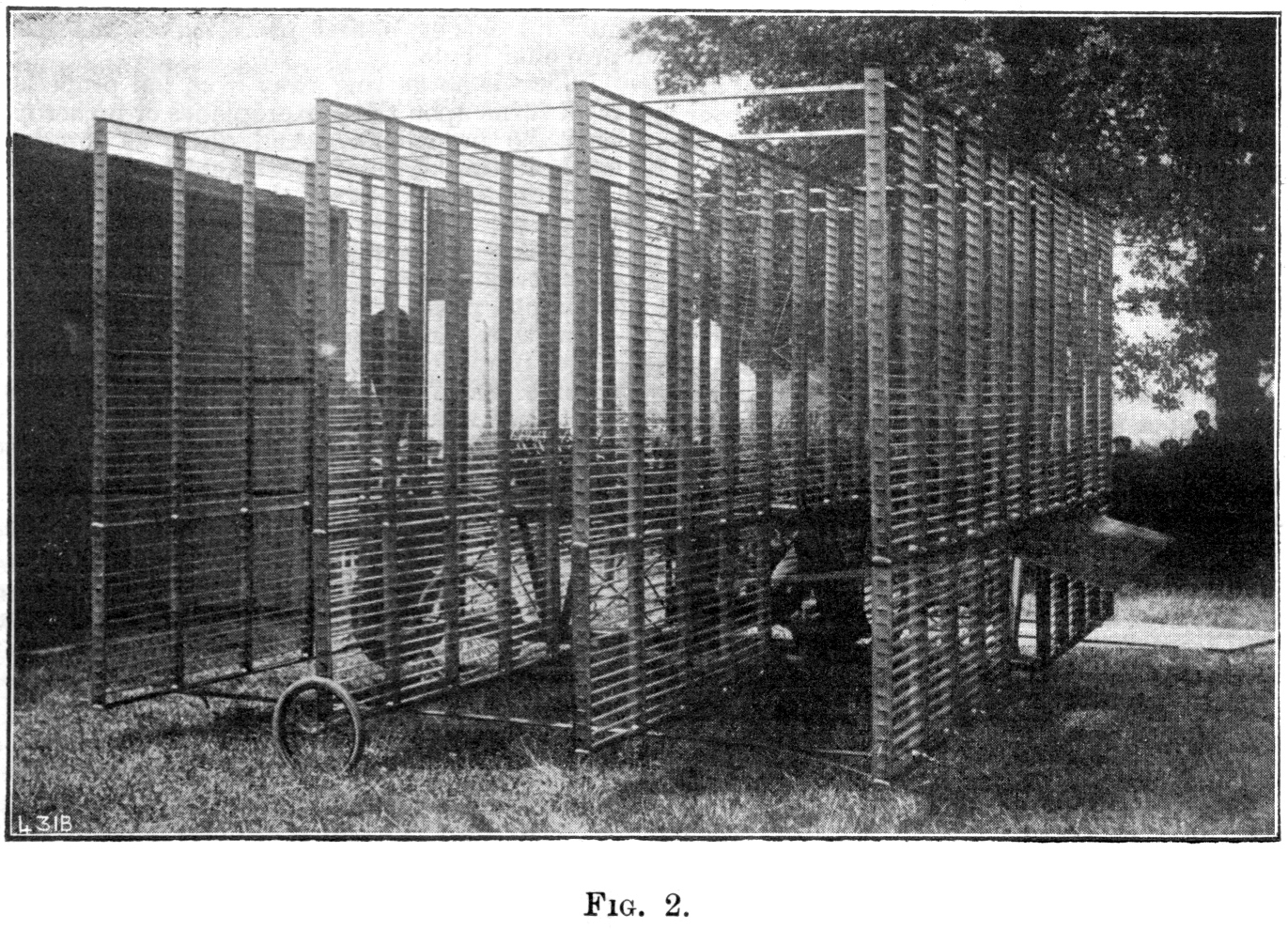
1907 Flying Machine

- His 1907 Multiplane, which had 200 individual airfoils and was powered by a 22 hp (16 kW) engine driving a 7 ft (2.1 m) propeller achieved a 500 ft (150 m) flight on 6 April 1907. This was the first flight of its kind in England, although it was preceded by the Wright brothers by several years.

Though successful, the 1907 model showed poor performance compared to more conventional contemporary types. This caused Phillips to end his attempts at manned flight.
