= Charles K. Hamilton =

American aviator (1885–1914)

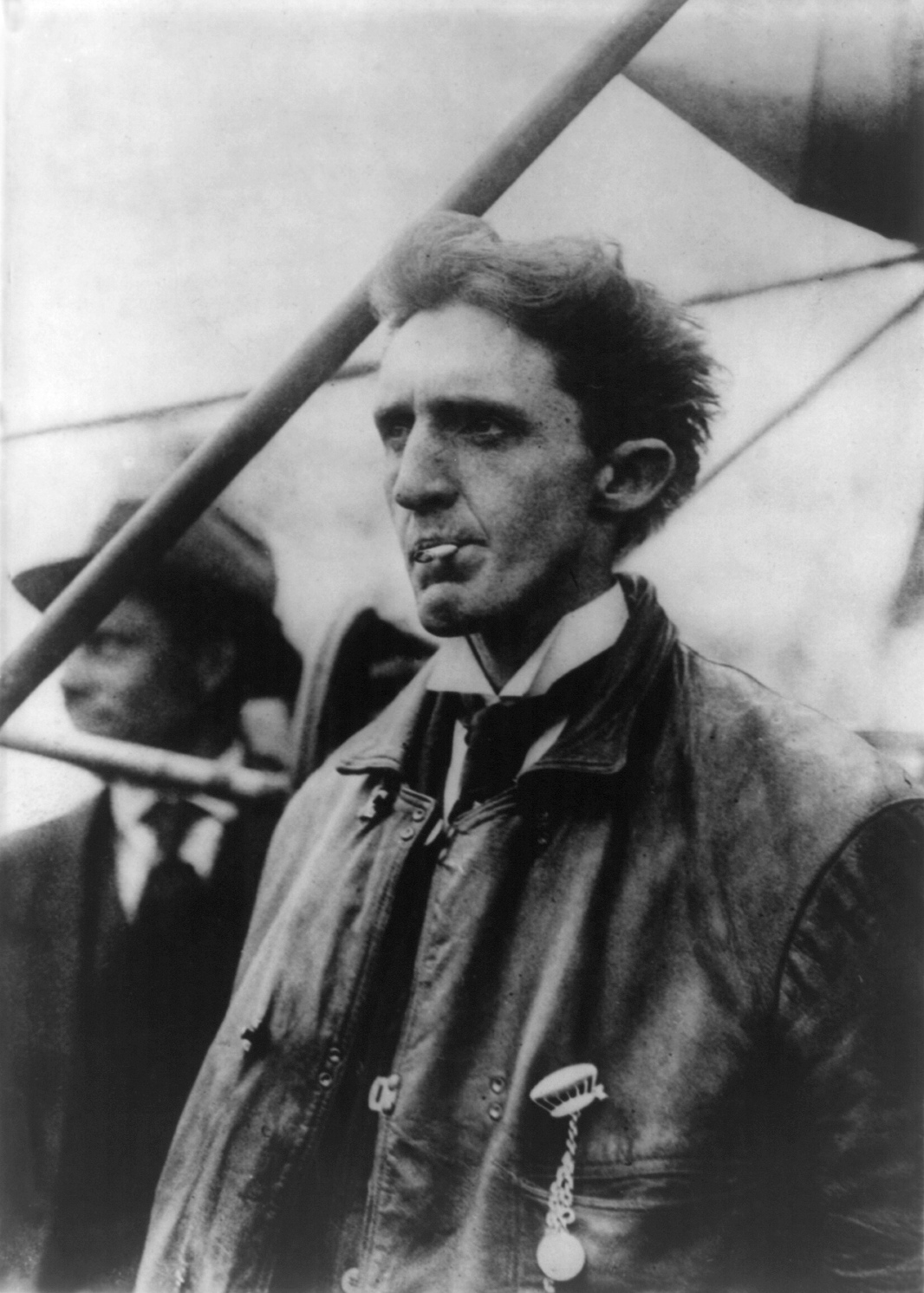
- Hamilton in 1910
- Born: Charles Keeney Hamilton; May 30, 1885; New Britain, Connecticut, U.S.
- Died: January 22, 1914 (aged 28)
- Occupation: Aviator

Charles Keeney Hamilton (May 30, 1885 – January 22, 1914) was an American aviator nicknamed the "crazy man of the air". He was, in the words of the Centennial of Flight Commission, "known for his dangerous dives, spectacular crashes, extensive reconstructive surgeries, and ever present cigarette" and was "frequently drunk". He survived more than 60 crashes.

== Biography ==
Hamilton was born on May 30, 1885, in New Britain, Connecticut, to Joseph and Nellie Hamilton. His parents split up by the time he was six.

Hamilton – who described himself as an "aeronaut" – was a hot air balloonist and parachute jumper at fairs and circuses at age 18. Three years later, he became friends with aeronautical engineer and aviator A. Roy Knabenshue and began piloting dirigibles. On the day Louis Blériot flew the English Channel, July 25, 1909, Hamilton was sailing his own airship across the Bay of Osaka in Japan.

In late 1909, Hamilton started taking flying lessons from Glenn Curtiss. He joined Curtiss's exhibition team and quickly acquired fame and a nationwide reputation as a daredevil flyer. In December, he flew at St. Joseph and outside St. Louis, and in Overland Park, Kansas, before participating in the 1910 Los Angeles International Air Meet at Dominguez Field, the first major airshow in the United States, which ran from January 10–20, 1910. He then embarked on an 11-city, two-month exhibition tour across the American Southwest, starting at Phoenix, Arizona, and ending in San Diego. On February 19, Hamilton became the first to fly an airplane in Tucson, Arizona. In San Diego, he became just the third American flier to remain aloft for at least an hour, crossing the ocean to Mexico and back.

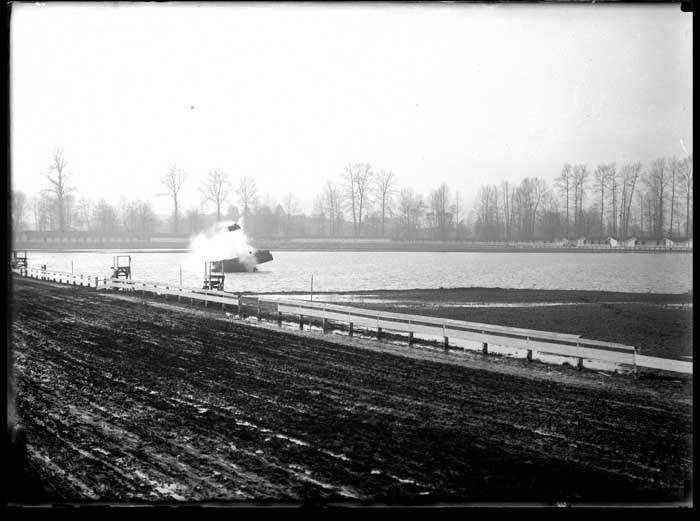
One of Hamilton's many crashes, on March 12, 1910, in Washington state

Hamilton became the first to fly in the state of Washington, when he piloted the Reims Racer over Seattle on March 11. The very next day, he went up again, drunk, and "Swooping like a rapacious bird from a height of 500 feet [150 m], the Curtiss biplane, with Charles K. Hamilton, dived into the newly formed lake at The Meadows". He had to be fished out of the lake, but suffered only minor injuries.

Undaunted, Hamilton flew at Tacoma, Washington, and crossed the border to become the "First Air Visitor to Vancouver, B.C." on March 25. The next day, he flew to New Westminster and back, covering 20 miles (32 km) in 30 minutes. He participated in an air meet in Spokane, Washington between April 1–3. On April 9, he flew over Mercer Island and Lake Washington.

In San Antonio, Hamilton set a record for the quickest takeoff: 79 feet (24 m) in 3.8 seconds, breaking Glenn Curtiss's mark of 95 feet (29 m) in 5.25 seconds. In May, he performed in Atlanta and Augusta, Georgia, before heading to Mineola, New York, Curtiss's headquarters.

On June 13, 1910, Hamilton won a prize of $10,000, sponsored by The New York Times and the Philadelphia Public Ledger, for being the first to fly from New York City to Philadelphia and back, the first flight between two major US cities. He departed from Governors Island in New York harbor at 7:30 am and reached Philadelphia at 9:26 am. With a stopover in Philadelphia, the round trip took a little over 11 hours, at an average speed of nearly 51 miles per hour (82 km/h). He received a hero's welcome in his hometown of New Britain, and, on July 2, 1910, made "the first public flight in the State" there. It was also the first in New England.

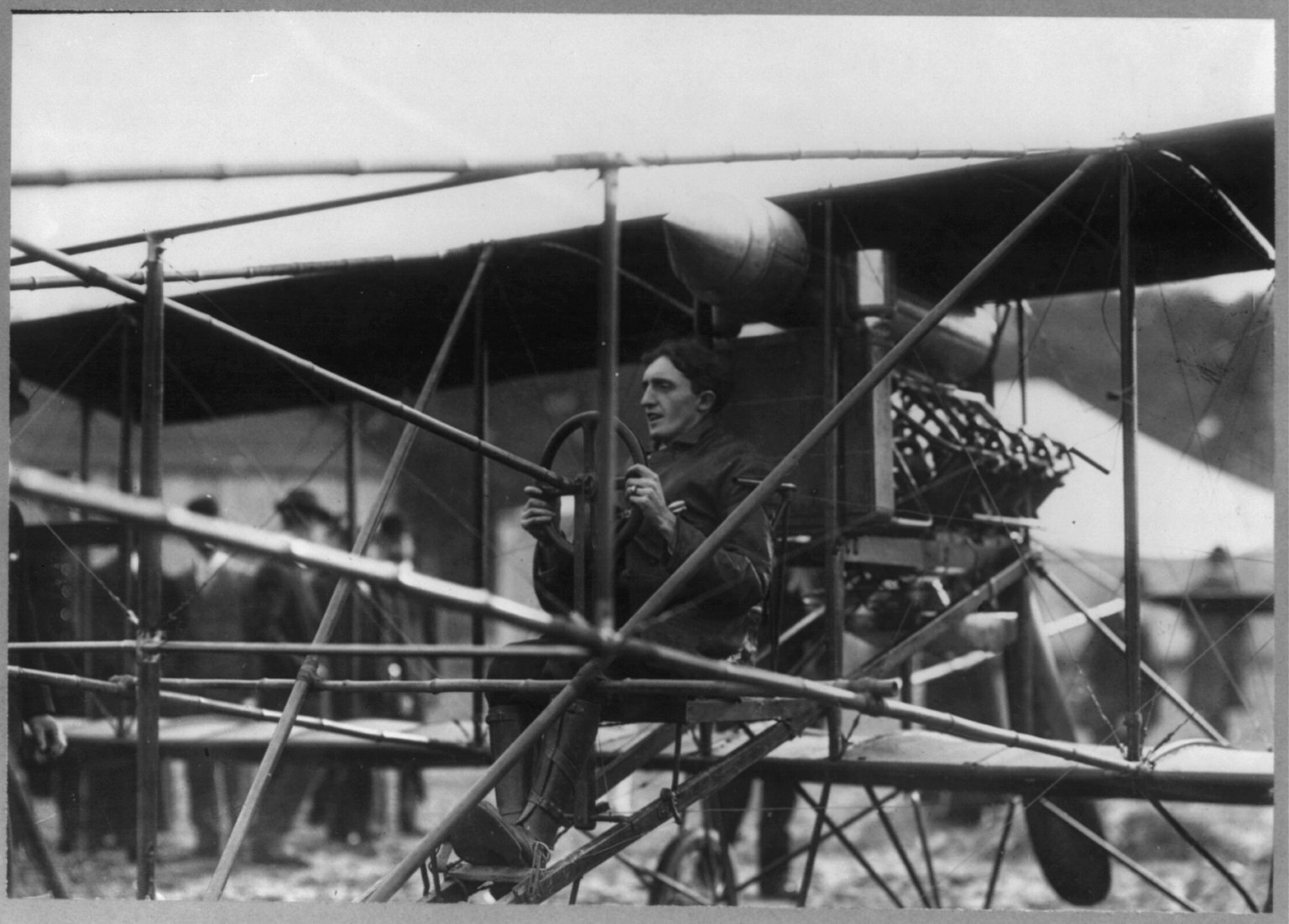
Hamilton c. 1910

Between June and August, Hamilton performed at Knoxville, Nashville and Atlantic City. In Nashville, he made the first night flight in America, remaining aloft 25 minutes before developing engine trouble.

When Hamilton fell behind on payments, Glenn Curtiss repossessed the Reims Racer. Hamilton then had a new airplane built by Walter Christie, who had a car and engine factory in Manhattan. Finished on August 31, it was reputed to have the most powerful airplane engine yet, boasting 110 hp. Hamilton named his new airplane the "Hamiltonian". In September, however, the Hamiltonian stalled and crashed during a demonstration flight outside Sacramento, California; Hamilton was "badly cut, bruised and burned", but was flying again in a week. "On September 28, he was issued American pilot license no. 12".

Hamilton then joined John Moisant's exhibition team, performing with them in Richmond, Virginia, and Chattanooga and Memphis, Tennessee. In Memphis, he broke his own speed record of 64.6 miles per hour (104.0 km/h) by going 79.2 miles per hour (127.5 km/h). On February 2, 1911, the team was in El Paso, Texas. Hamilton flew over nearby Ciudad Juárez and performed the first wartime aerial reconnaissance, looking for rebel forces of the Mexican Revolution. That same month, he and Moisant parted company, with Moisant keeping his airplane. He pioneered flying in Cleveland, Tennessee, in October 1911, piloting a Curtiss biplane. It was the first plane landing ever in Cleveland and the local newspaper called it at the time "The greatest event in the history of Bradley Country".

Hamilton married twice. He was divorced by his first wife and was survived by his second, Gussie, whom he had married the summer before his death.

He died on January 22, 1914, aged 28, from tuberculosis or "a lung hemorrhage after a long bout with tuberculosis". He was buried in Hartford, Connecticut, on January 26.

Those familiar with his short career claimed he had earned a quarter of a million dollars, but he died almost broke.
