= Wight Quadruplane =

British WWI quadruplane experimental fighter aircraft

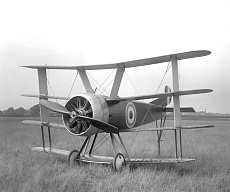
- Wight Quadruplane first version with landing gear partially recessed in lower wing, August 1916

General information
- Type: Fighter
- National origin: British
- Manufacturer: J. Samuel White
- Designer: Howard T Wright
- Number built: 1

History
- First flight: Mid 1916

The Wight Quadruplane, also referred to as the Wight Type 4, was a British single seat quadruplane fighter aircraft built by J Samuel White & Company Limited (Wight Aircraft) during World War I. Testing revealed design deficiencies and after the only example was involved in a crash, further work on the aircraft was abandoned.

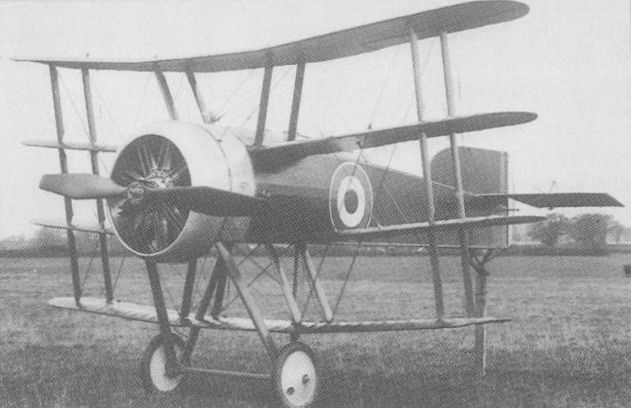
Second version with taller gear in early 1917

== Design and development ==
The Quadruplane serial no N546 was a prototype designed by Wight Aircraft general manager and design chief Howard T. Wright in 1916. Inspired by the Sopwith Triplane and other multi-wing aircraft of its time, it had an unusual arrangement in which the fuselage was placed between the middle two wings with upper and lower wings attached by struts. Another remarkable feature was that its wingspan was less than the overall length. The wings were cambered on the leading and trailing edges with a flat middle section. This wing design proved to be very inefficient. Power was provided by a 110 hp (82 kW) Clerget 9Z nine-cylinder air cooled rotary engine and it was to be armed with two 0.303 in (7.7 mm) Vickers machine guns.

The original version had two cabane struts of long chord length supporting the upper wing. Four similar type interplane struts were used between the upper three wings, all of which had ailerons. The bottom wing had a shorter span with pairs of struts and cut outs for the landing gear wheels. Because the axle was the same height as the lower wing, the tailskid was very tall to prevent that wings trailing edge from contacting the ground. When tested in mid 1916 the aircraft had difficulty taking off due to shallow wing incidence and displayed dangerous tendencies because of a lack of yaw control and a major redesign was required.

In February 1917 the second version was ready for testing. The single thick struts were replaced with more conventional parallel wire braced struts and the landing gear was lengthened. The new wings were of varying chord and the overall diameter of the fuselage was increased. Most importantly, a larger dorsal fin and rudder were installed. After several disappointing flights at Martlesham Heath the machine was returned to the aircraft production facilities in Cowes for another rework.

The final version had new wings of decreasing span from top to bottom and ailerons only on the upper two wings. At Martlesham Heath in July 1917, flight testing again revealed an unsatisfactory lack of control. In February 1918 the Quadruplane crashed into a cemetery and the project was abandoned.

A replica Quadruplane is on display at the Solent Sky museum in Southampton, England.

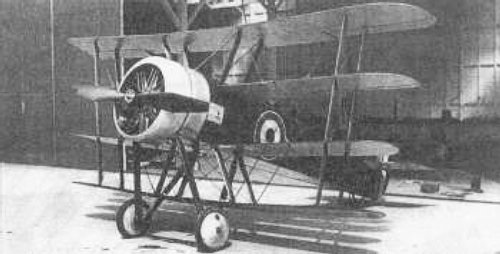
Final version with decreasing span wings July 1917

== Specifications ==
Data from

General characteristics

- Crew: One
- Length: 21 ft 6 in (6.55 m)
- Wingspan: 19 ft 0 in (5.79 m)
- Height: 10 ft 6 in (3.20 m)
- Powerplant: 1 × Clerget 9Z nine-cylinder rotary engine, 110 hp (82 kW)

Armament

- Guns: 2 × fixed forward-firing synchronized 0.303 in (7.70 mm) Vickers machine guns

== See also ==
Aircraft of comparable role, configuration, and era

- Armstrong Whitworth F.K.10
- Naglo D.II
