= Supermarine Nighthawk =

British-designed prototype for an anti-Zeppelin quadraplane aircraft

Nighthawk
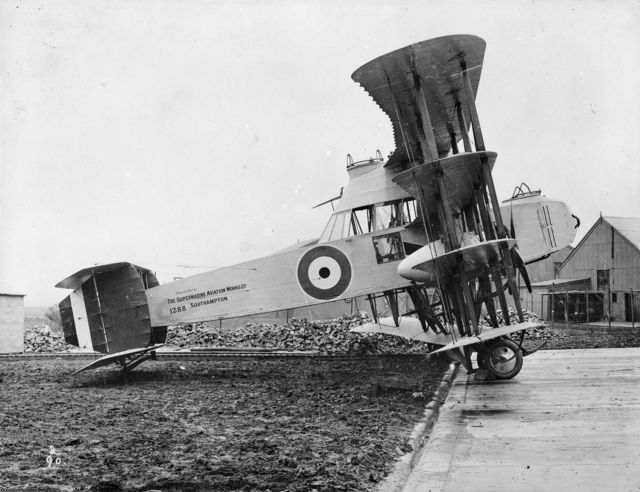

General information
- Other name: P.B.31E
- Type: Anti-Zeppelin fighter; Night fighter
- National origin: United Kingdom
- Manufacturer: Supermarine Aviation Works Ltd. (originally Pemberton Billing Ltd.)
- Number built: 1

History
- First flight: February 1917
- Developed from: P.B.29E "Battle Plane"
- Fate: Scrapped (July 1917)

The Supermarine Nighthawk or P.B.31E was a First World War British aircraft, designed by Noel Pemberton Billing and built at Woolston, Southampton after Pemberton Billing's company became Supermarine Aviation Works Ltd. The P.B.31E, as with its predecessor the P.B.29 "Battle Plane", was an anti-Zeppelin night fighter. It was operated by a crew of three to five, and was designed to fly for 9 to 18 hours. The prototype of the P.B.31E flew in February 1917. It quickly became obsolete when it was found that Zeppelins could more easily be destroyed by igniting their hydrogen bags using explosive bullets. Only a prototype aircraft was built.

== Background ==
The Nighthawk was developed to counter the threat of bombing raids by German Zeppelins against the UK during the First World War. In 1916, the British Member of Parliament and aviator Noel Pemberton Billing published Air War: How To Wage It, which included promotion of the use of aircraft as a defensive measure against Zeppelins. He wrote:

[Each machine must].. also carry a searchlight driven independently of the engines. It must have at least a speed of 80 m.p.h. [130km/h] to overtake airships... It must be able to carry fuel for 12hr cruising at low speed to enable it to chase an airship to the coast. It must be able to climb to 10,000ft in not more than 20min... The engines must be silenced. The pilots must have a clear-view arc of fire above, in front and below. All the above requirements are within the capacity of any competent aeroplane designer.

— Air War: How To Wage It (1916)

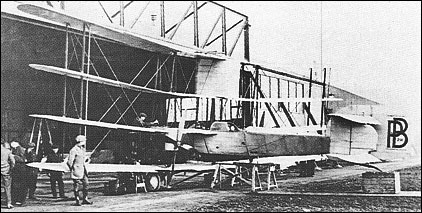
The Pemberton Billing PB-29 at NRAS Chingford in 1916

Pemberton Billing, who owned the small aircraft company based at Woolston, Southampton, was asked by the British government to design and build a slow aircraft capable of attacking an airborne Zeppelin. He responded to the government's request by personally designing a quadruplane aircraft according to the recommendations of Air War: How To Wage It, which was designated as the P.B.29E. (Note: "E" stood for 'experimental'.) The quadruplane configuration was required because the wing surface area needed to be large enough to lift the aeroplane to the same altitude of a Zeppelin. It had two cockpits (in front and behind the wings) that had dual controls, as well as a tailplane and three rudders. The two propellers were driven by 90-horsepower (67 kW) Austro-Daimler engines. A crew member armed with a Lewis gun was in an enclosed position above the third wing.

The P.B.29E was delivered to the Royal Naval Air Service (RNAS) station at Chingford, Essex, where it underwent tests on 1 January 1916 and received a somewhat critical report. Shortly after the completion of the RNAS trials, the aircraft crashed at Chingford. After it was written off, the wreckage was returned to Woolston. The design of the P.B.29E was thought by the RNAS to be good enough to be developed further and an order to construct two improved machines was given.

== Design and development ==
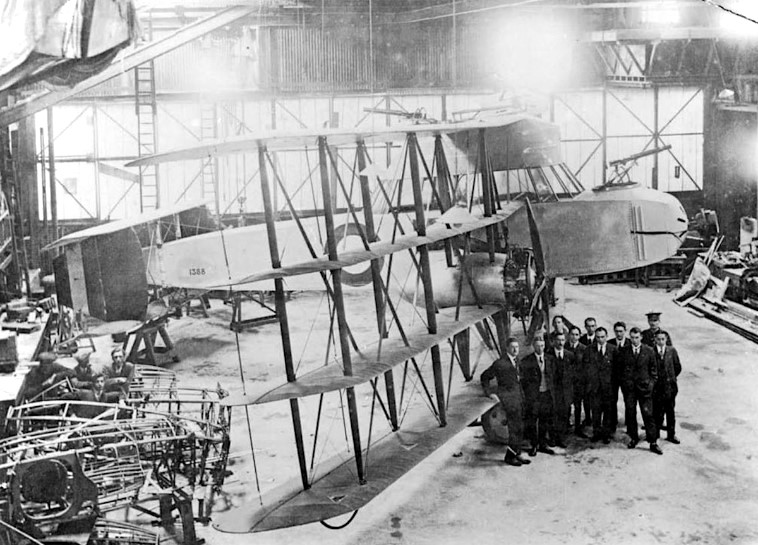
The P.B.31E at the Supermarine works at Woolston, Southampton. R.J. Mitchell, who was to succeed as the company's chief designer, is standing fourth from the left.

The improved version of the P.B.29E was called the P.B.31E. Drawings of the new aircraft dating from July to November 1916 have the initials of Reginald Mitchell, who became its chief designer. (Note: The drawings, which are dated 18 September 1916, include those concerned with one of the nacelles, and of gun mounts.) Mitchell is best known for designing racing seaplanes such as the Supermarine S.6B and for leading the team that designed the Supermarine Spitfire.

The P.B.31E incorporated the quadraplane wings and tailplane of its predecessor. It was powered by two 100 hp (75 kW) Anzani 9-cylinder radial engines. It was designed for long-lasting flights, with patrols occurring at low speeds whilst a Zeppelin was being hunted. It had a trainable nose-mounted searchlight to detect enemy aircraft. A 1½-pounder (37 mm) Davis gun was mounted above the top wing with 20 shells and it carried two .303 in (7.7 mm) Lewis guns. Power for the searchlight was provided by an independent petrol engine-driven generator made by ABC Motors, possibly the first instance of a recognisable airborne auxiliary power unit. The comfort of the crew was considered in the design; the cockpit was enclosed and heated and sleeping quarters were provided in the form of a bunk. The Admiralty ordered two aircraft of the type but only number 1388, was built.

== Operational history ==
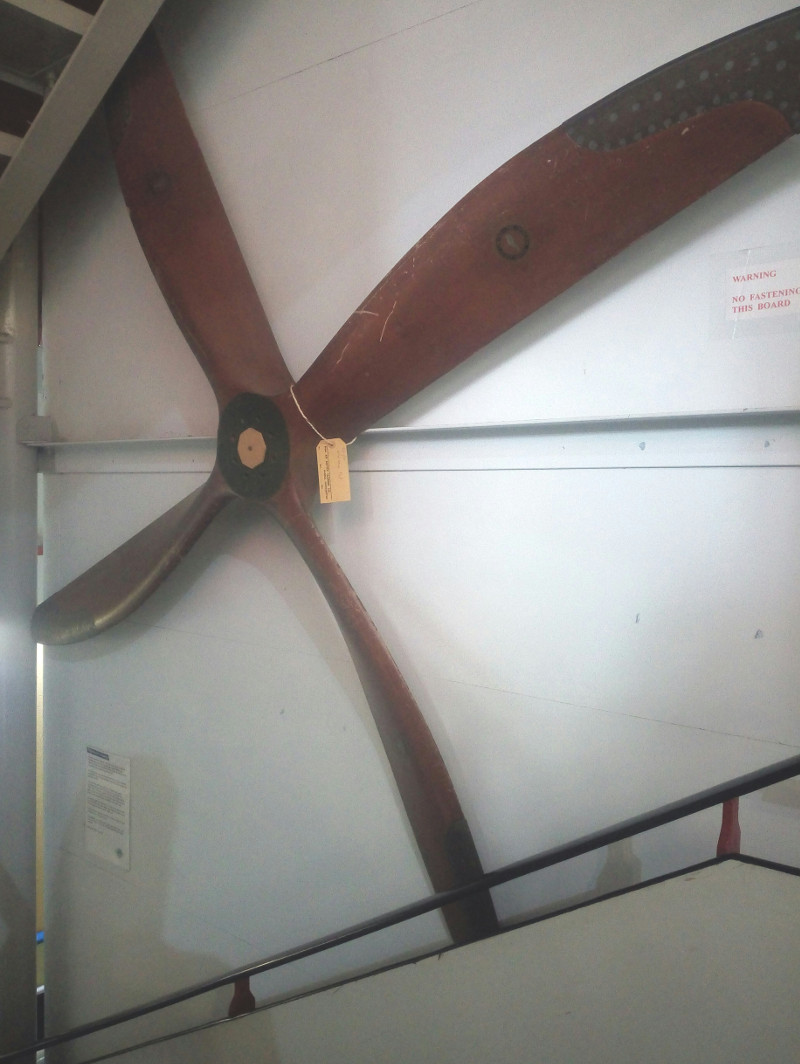
The Nighthawk propeller at Solent Sky

The Nighthawk (as it became known) first flew in February 1917, eight months after Pemberton Billing Ltd. had been sold to the airman and entrepreneur Hubert Scott-Paine and renamed the Supermarine Aviation Works Ltd. The aircraft was tested by the American test pilot Clifford B. Prodger. During trials at Eastchurch, Kent, Prodger managed to reach a speed of 75 mph (121 km/h) and attained a landing speed of 35 mph (56 km/h).

The Nighthawk's lack of power meant that it took an hour to attain an altitude of 10,000 feet (3,000 m). It finally became obsolete when it was found that Zeppelins could be destroyed using explosive bullets fired from a more lightly armed aircraft, which caused the highly flammable hydrogen to ignite. The Nighthawk was scrapped in July 1917. One of the aircraft's propellers is preserved at Solent Sky, an aviation museum in Southampton.

== Specifications (prototype) ==
Data from The British Fighter since 1912

General characteristics

- Crew: 4 (2 pilots, 2 gunners)
- Length: 37 ft 0 in (11.28 m)
- Wingspan: 60 ft 0 in (18.29 m)
- Height: 17 ft 8.5 in (5.398 m)
- Wing area: 962 sq ft (89.4 m^{2})
- Empty weight: 3,677 lb (1,668 kg)
- Gross weight: 6,146 lb (2,788 kg)
- Powerplant: 2 × Anzani 10-cylinder air-cooled radial piston engines, 100 hp (75 kW) each
- Propellers: 4-bladed fixed-pitch propellers

Performance

- Maximum speed: 75 mph (121 km/h, 65 kn)
- Endurance: 9 hours normal; 18 hours maximum
- Time to altitude: 10,000 ft (3,048 m) in 60 minutes

Armament

- Guns: 1 × 1½-pdr Davis gun and 1 × Lewis gun above upper wing, 1 × Lewis gun in the nose

== Sources ==
- Andrews, Charles Ferdinand; Morgan, Eric B. (1981). Supermarine Aircraft since 1914. London: Putnam. ISBN 978-03701-0-018-0.
- Goodall, Michael H. (2014). "Pemberton Billing and the Four-Winged Farrago". The Aviation Historian (8). Horsham: 32–39. ISSN 2051-1930 – via Archive Foundation.
- Jarrett, Philip (2007). The Colour Encyclopedia of Incredible Aeroplanes. London: Dorling Kindersley. ISBN 978-14053-1-767-2 – via Archive Foundation.
- King, H. F. (2 October 1953). "Sires of the Spitfire: A Forty-Year Record of Supermarine Achievement". Flight. Vol. LXIV, no. 2332. pp. 461–480. Archived from the original on 24 June 2015.
- Mason, Francis K. (1992). The British Fighter since 1912. Annapolis, MD: Naval Institute Press. ISBN 978-1-55750-082-3.
- Pegram, Ralph (2016). Beyond the Spitfire: The Unseen Designs of R. J. Mitchell. Cheltenham: The History Press. ISBN 978-0-7509-6515-6.
- Price, Alfred (2002). The Spitfire Story (2nd ed.). London: Arms and Armour Press. ISBN 978-0-85368-861-7 – via Archive Foundation.
- Roussel, Mike (2013). Spitfire's Forgotten Designer: The Career of Supermarine's Joe Smith. Brimscombe Port: The History Press. ISBN 978-0-7524-8759-5.
- Shelton, John K. (2015). From Nighthawk to Spitfire: The Aircraft of R. J. Mitchell. Stroud: History Press. ISBN 978-07509-6-550-7.
