= Frank Joseph Zirbel =

American artist

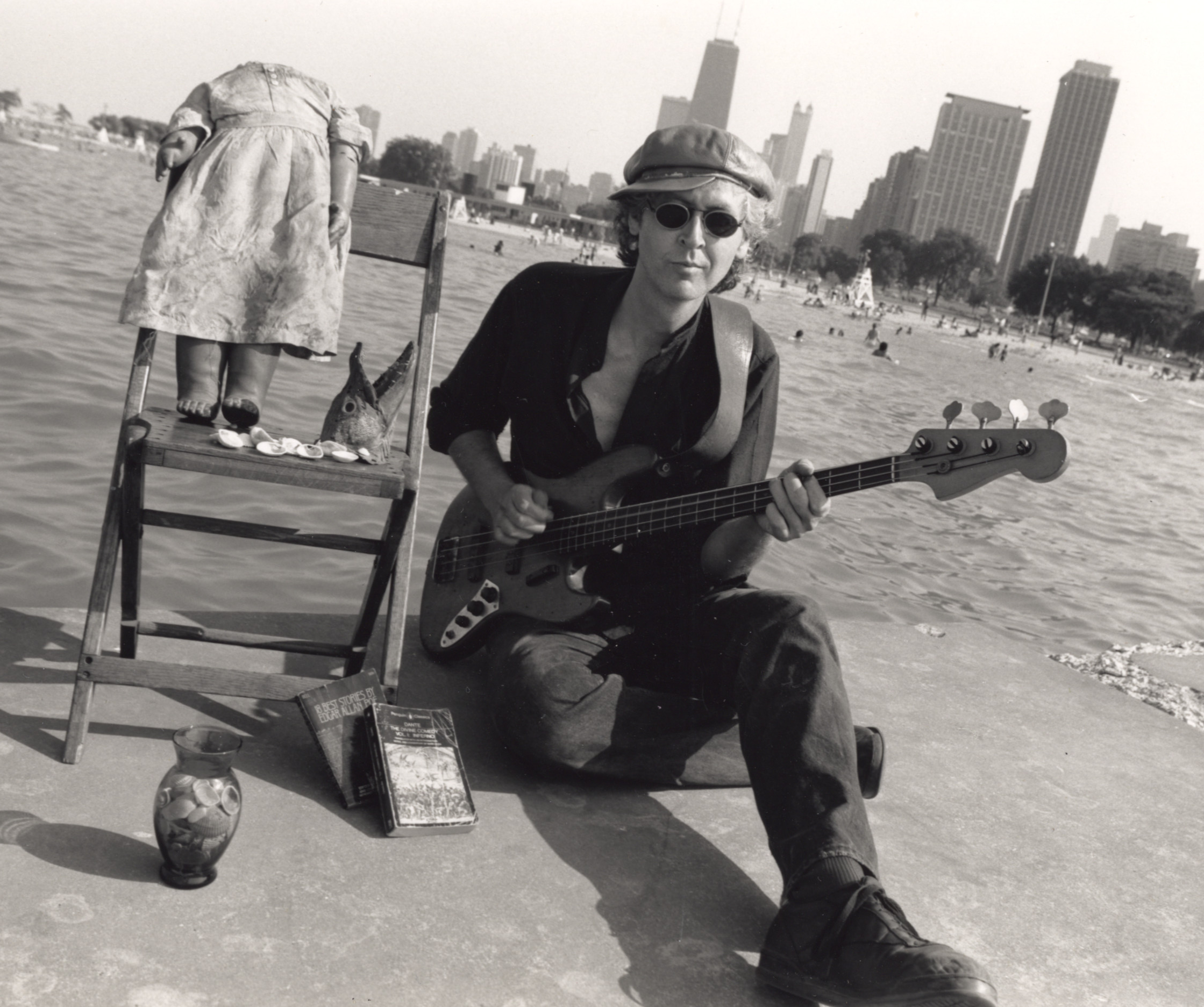
- Promotional photograph by Ellen Connery
- Born: 1947 (age 78–79); Green Bay, Wisconsin, U.S.
- Education: University of Wisconsin-Madison
- Occupations: Musician; Composer; Filmmaker; Artist

Frank Joseph Zirbel (born 1947) is an American musician, composer, filmmaker and self-taught artist. In 1979 he became the bass player for the Chicago new wave band, Bohemia. The band tied the United States in 1983 and 1984. He wrote some of Bohemia's songs on their five vinyl releases, including "Automatic Mind," "Empty Room," "No Ordinary Moon," and "Love Turns to Stone."

== Life ==
Frank Joseph Zirbel was born in Green Bay, Wisconsin in 1947. In 1970, he graduated from the University of Wisconsin–Madison, with a bachelor of arts degree in Philosophy. His first group show dates back to 1973 at Edgewood Orchard Gallery in Door County, Wisconsin. More than 70 group and several one-man shows have followed. He lived in Chicago from 1977, and moved to New York 1986.

== Work ==
Zirbel’s art uses representational imagery within the stylistic modes of figurative expressionism and classical surrealism.

Zirbel has claimed that his initial drawing style came together in the second half of the 1970s while he was working the midnight shift in admissions at the Elgin Mental Health Center, Elgin, Illinois. Here, having previously worked on all the various wards, and with extra time on his hands between admissions, he created unique black-and-white ink drawings inspired by the psychotic and the insane. During his employ at the hospital, Zirbel also made a 16mm documentary film titled "Duck Eggs and the Miniature Rooster" containing an interview with Hermine Pakrovsky, one of the hospital's revolving-door patients. The film made its television debut on Chicago's local PBS affiliate in 1977. Zirbel's dark novel "The Idiot's Grasp" was inspired by his work at the hospital. The novel is now housed in the Museum of Modern Art's artists book collection. In late 1998, Chattanooga, Tennessee art dealer Angela Usrey discovered these works and consigned a few, awarding Zirbel a show at her gallery. In January, 1999, she exhibited these works at New York’s Outsider Art Fair. Usrey named them the "Asylum Drawings." Her Tanner Hill Gallery continued exhibiting this series at the N.Y. Outsider art fair through 2012.

Zirbel often has worked in series-related art. One such series, "The Messenger Street Drawing Series" (early 1990s) was inspired by the urban images he saw while working as a bicycle messenger in Chicago. In November 1995, a month after Zirbel quit being a messenger, the Chicago photographer, Mark Debernardi, did a raw video interview with him in his studio reflecting on Zirbel's five year stint on the street. Included in the piece are some works from the messenger drawing series itself. A 1997 exhibition of these drawings at the Judith Racht Gallery, Chicago, garnered Zirbel Chicago Magazine’s selection as Chicago’s best undiscovered artist for that year.

Another set of works revolving around a single theme, Zirbel's "Influencing Artists Series", expanded into etchings, paintings, collage and assemblage and explores the faces and personalities of those who inspired him. In 2005, Susan Aurinko’s Flatfile Galleries, Chicago, presented a surrealist show featuring several paintings from this series, including portraits of Luis Bunuel, Rene Magritte, and an extensive etching series on Edgar Allan Poe.

In late 2015, The Art Center - Highland Park invited Zirbel to exhibit many of his found object sculptures in a group show. 2016 witnessed a drawing of his being chosen for the Williams College Museum of Art's Walls Collection, in Williamstown, Massachusetts. In 2017, two portraits of Nelson Algren by Zirbel (a painting/collage and a monotype) were purchased by collectors and loaned to the Nelson Algren Museum of Miller Beach, Gary, Ind. for an indefinite time period.

On YouTube, Zirbel's many films and videos can be seen on his film channel, Frank Joseph Zirbel. Recent additions include two films, "The Human Riddle," and "The Mask and the Mirror," from the compilation, "Seven Gnarled Tales of the Unholy," based on drawings he did after Pieter Bruegel's "Seven Deadly Sins" engravings. This set of seven drawings is titled, "Quicksand and Quagmire." The film is an American/German co-production with animation and camera work completed in Munich by Mike Hans Steffl.

In 2018, "Reptilian Calculations," the fifth episode of "Seven Gnarled Tales of the Unholy," premiered on May 9 at the Paris Short Film Festival. The film was also selected for showing during Poland's all summer out door film festival, On Art - Poland, based out of Warsaw, Poland. In August, it received an Honorable Mention at the Los Angeles Experimental Forum Festival and then was chosen for exhibition in late November at the Directors Circle Festival of Shorts, in Erie, Pennsylvania.

== Public collections ==
- Museum of Modern Art - Artists Books Collection / New York, New York
- Williams College Museum of Art - Walls Collection / Williamstown, Massachusetts

Under the moniker Mental Insect, he has played bass guitar. In the first half of the 1980s, he was a member of the Chicago new wave band, Bohemia (1979-1984) which released one full album: Deviations, with a Zirbel drawing on the cover.
