= Zerbe Air Sedan =

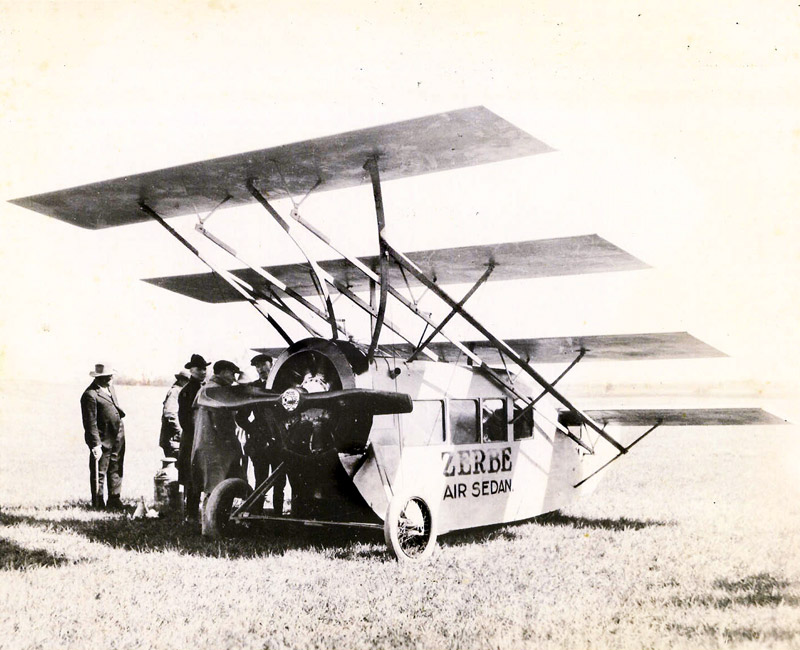
- Zerbe Air Sedan at the Fayetteville, Arkansas fair grounds in 1921

General information
- Type: Passenger
- National origin: United States
- Designer: Professor James Slough Zerbe
- Status: Abandoned project
- Number built: 1

History
- First flight: 1921

The Zerbe Air Sedan was an American single engine quadruplane passenger aircraft project started by James Slough Zerbe in 1918. The machine made one flight in 1921, was damaged during landing, and was subsequently abandoned.

== Design and development ==
In 1918 Zerbe arrived in Fayetteville, Arkansas to begin work on passenger aircraft for local businessmen. The aircraft, completed in 1919, was a positive staggered equal span quadruplane with double cambered louvered main wings. Equipped with no tailplane or ailerons, the machine was controlled using "ganged" or linkage connected wings with variable-incidence.

The passenger cabin was made of plywood and fully enclosed with wide stance landing gear attached. A French World War I surplus powerplant was used, and has been reported to be a 90 hp (67 kW) LeRhône or 100 hp (75 kW) Gnôme rotary engine, but evidence suggests it was in fact a Le Rhône 9J of 110 hp (82 kW).

== Operational history ==
The Air Sedan was piloted by Tom Flannery on its first and only flight in 1921 at the Washington County Fairgrounds in Fayetteville. The aircraft took off and quickly climbed to 100 ft (30 m), flew approximately 1000 ft (300 m) then was significantly damaged during landing.

One report states: "After that Zerbe left town never to be heard of or seen again [however he died in New York in 1921]. What happened to the abandoned damaged plane is unknown."
