= Zerbes =

Zerbes (German pronunciation: [tsɛrbɛs]) is a surname, originally from Homorod, Brașov in what is now Romania. Theories of its origin include a connection to Saint Servatius, or to Cerberus.

People with this surname include:

- Michael Zerbes (born 1944), German sprinter
- Sarah Zerbes (born 1978), German mathematician
- Januario Zerbes (born 1968), Brazilian merchant

== See also ==
- Zerbes Reserve, the playing ground of Doncaster East Football Club
- Zerbe (disambiguation)
