= Armstrong Whitworth F.K.10 =

British WWI quadruplane fighter aircraft

F.K.10
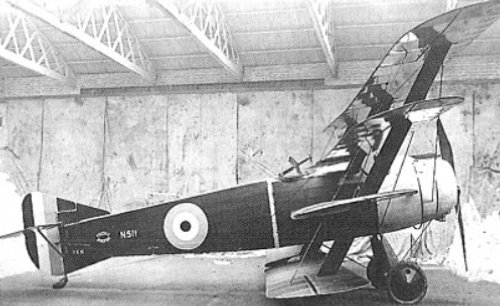
- F.K.10

General information
- Type: Fighter
- Manufacturer: Armstrong Whitworth
- Designer: Frederick Koolhoven
- Number built: 9 (1 F.K.9 + 8 F.K.10)

History
- First flight: 1916

The Armstrong Whitworth F.K.10 was a British two-seat quadruplane (i.e., four wing) fighter aircraft built by Armstrong Whitworth during the First World War. While it was ordered in small numbers for the Royal Flying Corps and Royal Naval Air Service, it was not used operationally. It is one of the few quadruplane aircraft to reach production.

== Development ==
The F.K.10 was designed in 1916 by Frederick Koolhoven, the chief designer of Armstrong Whitworth Aircraft as a single-engine two-seat fighter. Koolhoven chose the novel quadruplane layout, also used by Pemberton-Billing (later known as Supermarine) for the P.B.29E and Supermarine Nighthawk anti-Zeppelin aircraft, and the contemporary Wight Quadruplane scout. At roughly the same time, Sopwith were building the successful Sopwith Triplane fighter.

The first prototype, the F.K.9 was built and first flown in the summer of 1916, powered by a 110 hp (80 kW) Clerget 9Z rotary engine. It had a shallow fuselage, with the wings joined by plank-like interplane struts, similar to those used by the Sopwith Triplane. After evaluation at the Central Flying School in late 1916, a production order for 50 was placed by the RFC for a modified version, the F.K.10.

The production F.K.10 had a new, deeper fuselage, and a new tail, but retained the wing planform of the F.K.9. The F.K.10 showed inferior performance to the Sopwith 1½ Strutter, which was already in service as a successful two-seat fighter, and only five were built of the RFC order, with a further three built for the RNAS. They were not used operationally and the design was not developed further.

== Variants ==
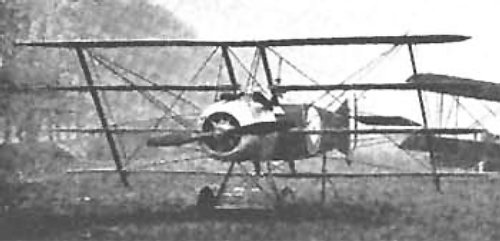
F.K.10

F.K.9
Prototype powered by 110 hp (80 kW) Clerget 9Z engine.
F.K.10
Production version with revised fuselage and tail, powered by 130 hp (100 kW) Clerget 9B or Le Rhône 9J engine. 50 ordered, 8 built.

== Operators ==
United Kingdom

- Royal Flying Corps
- Royal Naval Air Service

== Specifications (F.K.10 (130 hp Clerget)) ==
Data from Warplanes of the First World War, Fighters Volume One, Great Britain.

General characteristics

- Crew: Two
- Length: 22 ft 3 in (6.78 m)
- Wingspan: 27 ft 10 in (8.48 m)
- Height: 11 ft 6 in (3.51 m)
- Wing area: 390.4 sq ft (36.27 m^{2})
- Empty weight: 1,236 lb (561 kg)
- Gross weight: 2,019 lb (916 kg)
- Powerplant: 1 × Clerget 9B nine-cylinder rotary engine, 130 hp (97 kW)

Performance

- Maximum speed: 84 mph (135 km/h, 73 kn) at 6,500 ft (2,000 m)
- Endurance: 2 hr 30 min
- Service ceiling: 10,000 ft (3,000 m)
- Time to altitude: 37 min 10 sec to 10,000 ft (3,000 m)

Armament

- Guns: 1 × fixed, forward-firing .303 in (7.7 mm) Vickers machine gun and 1 × .303 in (7.7 mm) Lewis Gun in observer's cockpit

== See also ==
Aircraft of comparable role, configuration, and era

- Bristol F.2 Fighter
- Sopwith 1½ Strutter
- Wight Quadruplane
