= Zerbe Sextuplane =

Aircraft design, ca. 1908

Sextuplane
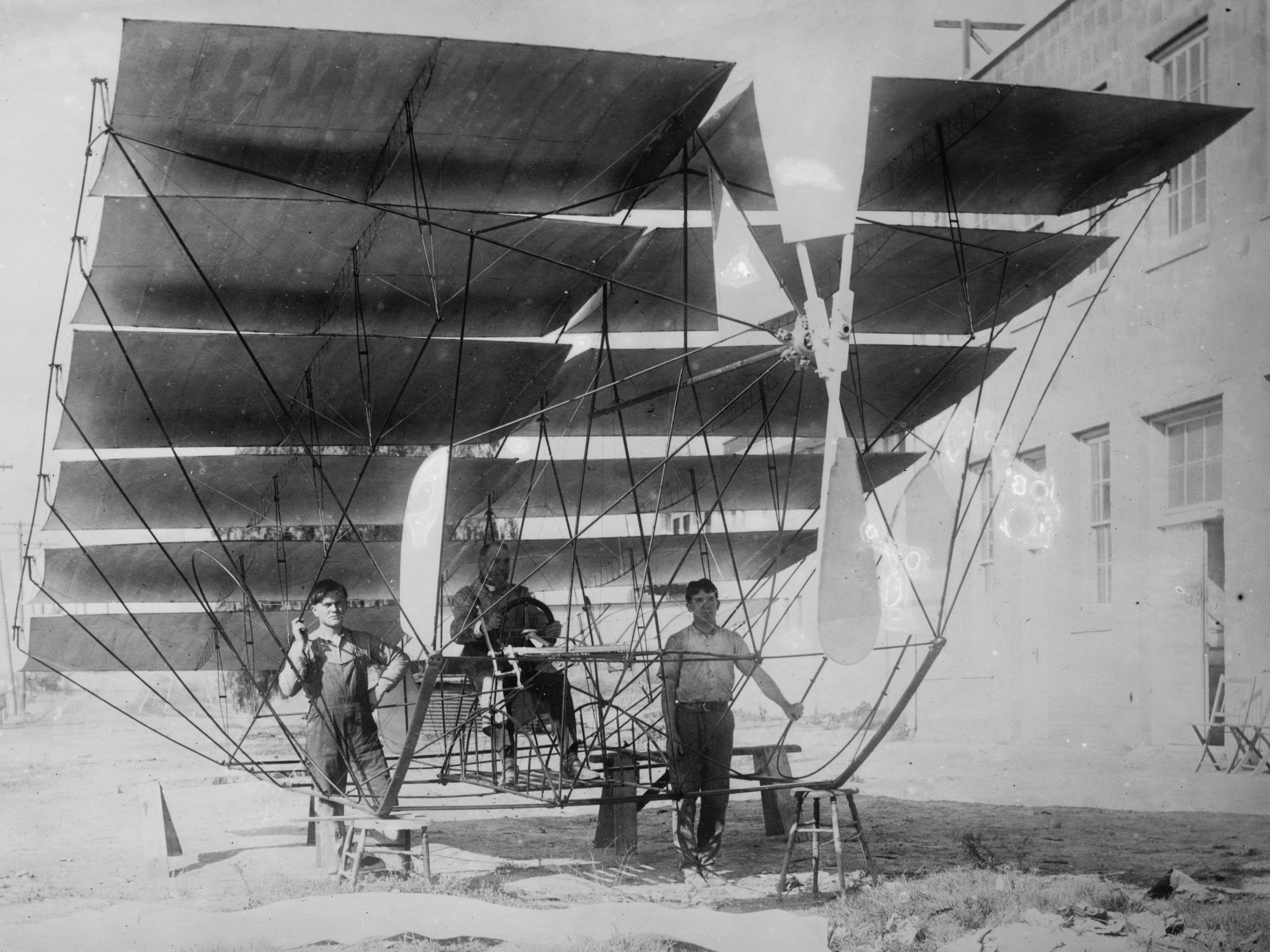

General information
- Type: Experimental aircraft
- National origin: United States
- Designer: James Slough Zerbe
- Number built: 1

History
- Introduction date: 1908
- Developed from: Zerbe Quintaplane

The Zerbe Sextuplane was an unconventional early aircraft designed by James Slough Zerbe around 1908. The aircraft mounted six wings, heavily staggered, above a framework on which the pilot sat; propulsion was provided by a single propeller mounted in a tractor configuration. No record survives of the Sextuplane's performance.
