= Multiplane (aeronautics) =

Stacked fixed-wing aircraft

In aviation, a multiplane is a fixed-wing aircraft-configuration featuring multiple wing planes. The wing planes may be stacked one above another, or one behind another, or both in combination. Types having a small number of planes have specific names and are not usually described as multiplanes:

- Biplane - two wings stacked one above the other
- Triplane - three wings stacked one above another
- Tandem wing - two main planes, one behind the other. The tandem triple or tandem triplet configuration has three lifting surfaces one behind another.

While triplane, quadruplane and tandem designs are relatively uncommon, aircraft with more than four sets of wings rarely occur - none have proven successful.

== Quadruplanes ==

The quadruplane configuration takes the triplane approach a step further, using efficient wings of high aspect ratio and stacking them to allow a compact and light weight design. During the pioneer years of aviation and World War I, a few designers sought these potential benefits for a variety of reasons, mostly with little success.

From 1908, the American inventor Matthew Bacon Sellers Jr. made a series of flights in a quadruplane, progressively fitted with powerplants of decreasing power, in order to investigate low-powered flight. He eventually achieved flight on only 5 to 6 hp at a speed of 20 mph.

Pemberton-Billing Ltd. made two prototype Zeppelin killers, the Pemberton-Billing P.B.29E and Pemberton-Billing P.B.31E, respectively in 1915 and 1917. They were comparatively large, twin-engined fighters. After the company changed its name to Supermarine, the P.B.31E became known as the Supermarine Nighthawk.

Following test flights with the prototype Armstrong Whitworth F.K.9 in 1916, a small number of Armstrong Whitworth F.K.10 quadruplane reconnaissance fighters were produced, but none saw combat action.

The private-venture Wight Quadruplane scout fighter was flown in 1917.

The Euler Vierdecker of 1917 unusually featured a standard triplane arrangement of fixed wings with a fourth uppermost wing comprising left and right hand articulated surfaces which acted as full-span ailerons. Two examples were built, with different engines.

Also in 1917, Friedrichshafen created the even more unusual Friedrichshafen FF.54 scout fighter, which featured narrow-chord second and third wings, with struts connecting only the upper pair and lower pair of planes. The prototype proved unacceptable in the air and was later modified as an equally unsuccessful triplane, again with a short-chord intermediate plane.

The Naglo D.II quadruplane fighter of 1918 featured a standard triplane arrangement with a smaller fourth wing attached below the main assembly, somewhat analogous to a sesquiplane. It participated in Germany's second D-type contest in 1918, and was praised for its construction and workmanship.

In 1922 Besson constructed the H-5, a prototype quadruplane flying boat transport. It was unusual in having two braced biplane wing stacks deeply staggered and vertically offset such that the four wing planes were stacked in an overall zig-zag arrangement. The only example was damaged and development was abandoned.

== More than four planes ==

Any fixed-wing aircraft with more than four wing planes may be referred to as a multiplane. Planes may be stacked vertically as with a biplane, or placed one in front of another as with a tandem wing. Both principles may be combined.

=== Stacked multiplanes ===
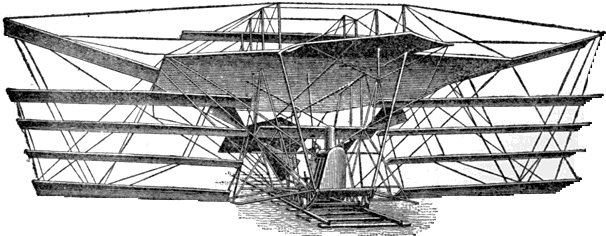
The Maxim Flying Machine with additional surfaces attached.

In the 1890s Hiram Maxim constructed a steam-powered flying machine which he ran on rails as a test rig. It began as a biplane and later more lifting and control surfaces were added to create a bizarre multiplane. On one occasion the lift force was so great that the rail was damaged. Maxim did not allow the rig to take off because it had no effective controls.

Horatio Phillips built a series of multiplane types from 1904. His Phillips Multiplane I had 20 stacked wings in an otherwise fairly conventional layout. It proved too unstable for sustained flight. By 1907 his third model was able to fly 500 ft, achieving the first successful powered flight in Great Britain. However the disappointing performance compared to more conventional contemporary types caused Phillips to abandon his ideas.

In 1908 John William Roshon in America and D'Equevilly in France produced typical multiplane designs. The AEA Cygnet II, designed by Alexander Graham Bell and constructed by the Aerial Experimental Association in America, featured a cellular multiplane formed by hundreds of tetrahedral shapes. Neither of these was capable of flight.

One of the most infamous multiplanes was the 1923 Gerhardt Cycleplane, a human-powered aircraft with seven sets of wings which made a single short hop under human power alone. Its flimsy construction and subsequent collapse was filmed, and this is often used as stock footage mocking early impractical aircraft designs.

=== Tandem multiplanes ===
The American Williams 1908 Multiplane featured four planes in tandem while the Zerbe Sextuplane of 1908 had six. The same year, in Switzerland the Dufaux 1908 Tandem Triplane provided the country's first native design in the form of a tandem pair of stacked triplane wings with a smaller biplane horizontal stabiliser.

=== Stacks in tandem ===
Anthony Fokker designed his bizarre Fokker V.8 about the same time as his famous Fokker Dr.I triplane. It featured a tandem arrangement of five wing planes, grouped as a stacked triplane fore wing and a biplane rear wing. Unlike its successful cousin, it barely flew and was soon abandoned.

As late as 1921, the Italian Gianni Caproni mated three stacks of triplane wings from his Caproni Ca.4 series to a single fuselage in tandem triple arrangement, to create the nine-winged Caproni Ca.60 Noviplano prototype long-range airliner. It proved unstable and crashed on its first flight.

== List of multiplane aircraft ==
This list includes types having four or more wing planes.

Type	Country	Class	Role	Date	Status	No.	Notes
Maxim Flying machine	UK	2 to 7 planes	Experimental	1890s	Test rig	0	Planes mostly stacked. Various configurations investigated. Held down on rails, it lifted but was never allowed to fly free.
Phillips test rig	UK	41 planes	Experimental	1893	Test rig	0	Stacked planes. Tethered to rails, lifted 3 ft.
Phillips Multiplane I	UK	20 planes	Experimental	1904	Prototype	1	Stacked planes. Hops but too unstable for sustained flight.
Phillips Multiplane II	UK	200 planes	Experimental	1907	Prototype	1	4 tandem stacks of 50 planes each. First successful powered flight in Great Britain.
Roshon multiplane	US	26 planes	Experimental	1907	Prototype	1	Tandem stacks of 13. Failed to fly.
Williams 1908 Multiplane	US	4 planes	Experimental	1908	Prototype	1	Tandem planes.
Zerbe Sextuplane	US	6 planes	Experimental	1908	Prototype	1	Tandem planes.
Dufaux triplane	Switzerland	8 planes	Experimental	1908	Prototype	1	Tandem pair of stacked triplane wings with a smaller biplane horizontal stabiliser. First Swiss aircraft. Failed to fly.
D'Equevilly multiplane	France	7 planes	Experimental	1908	Prototype	1	Failed to fly.
AEA Cygnet II	US	16 planes	Experimental	1908	Prototype	1	Planes of repeat tetrahedral form, stacked. Cellular multiplane designed by Alexander Graham Bell. Tentative flights only.
Sellers 1908 Quadruplane	US	4 planes	Experimental	1908	Prototype	1	Investigation of low-powered flight.
Pemberton-Billing P.B.29E	UK	4 planes	Fighter	1915	Prototype		Zeppelin killer.
Armstrong Whitworth F.K.9	UK	4 planes	Reconnaissance fighter	1916	Prototype		
Armstrong Whitworth F.K.10	UK	4 planes	Reconnaissance fighter	1917	Production		
Pemberton-Billing P.B.31E	UK	4 planes	Fighter	1917	Prototype		Zeppelin killer. Became the Supermarine Nighthawk.
Supermarine Nighthawk	UK	4 planes	Fighter	1917	Prototype		Zeppelin killer. Previously the Pemberton-Billing P.B.31E.
Wight quadruplane	UK	4 planes	Fighter	1917	Prototype	1	
Euler Vierdecker	Germany	4 planes	Fighter	1917	Prototype	2	Standard triplane arrangement of fixed wings with a fourth uppermost wing comprising left and right hand articulated surfaces which acted as full-span ailerons.
Friedrichshafen FF54	Germany	4 planes	Fighter	1917	Prototype		Narrow-chord second and third wings, with struts connecting only the upper pair and lower pair of planes. Later modified to triplane configuration.
Naglo D.II	Germany	4 planes	Fighter	1918	Prototype		Standard triplane arrangement with a smaller fourth wing attached below the main assembly, analogous to a sesquiplane.
Fokker V.8	Germany	5 planes	Fighter	1917	Prototype		Tandem arrangement, grouped as a stacked triplane fore wing and a biplane rear wing.
Johns Multiplane	US	7 planes	Experimental	1919	Prototype	1	Unable to maintain controlled flight.
Zerbe Air Sedan	US	4 planes	Experimental	1919	Prototype	1	Crashed on first flight.
Caproni Ca.60 Noviplano	Italy	9 planes	Transport	1921	Prototype	1	Three tandem stacks of triplane wings, nine in all. Flying boat.
Besson H-5	France	4 planes	Transport	1922	Prototype		Flying boat with two braced biplane wing stacks deeply staggered and vertically offset such that the four wing planes were stacked in an overall zig-zag arrangement.
Gerhardt Cycleplane	US	7 planes	Experimental	1923	Prototype	1	Stacked wings. Human-powered
