= Laura Zirbes =

American educator

Laura Zirbes (April 26, 1884 in Buffalo, New York – June 9, 1967 in Columbus, Ohio) was an American educator, an important figure in education and reading instruction.

== Career ==
Zirbes began her teaching career at an elementary school in Cleveland from 1903 to 1919, and then went on to work at the experimental Lincoln School at Teachers College, Columbia University from 1920 until 1926. She earned her doctoral degree from Columbia University in 1928. From 1928 she taught at Ohio State University, until her retirement in 1954. In all her teaching years combined, she taught for 61 years, including summer sessions until 1964.

During so many years of teaching, Zirbes experienced some of the most important issues affecting education in the United States throughout the twentieth century. In Cleveland, she taught a class of fifty-six fourth graders that were all children of immigrants. During her time at Columbia, she listened to Edward L. Thorndike, John Dewey, and William Bagley discuss the value of testing, and heard Bagley argue with William Heard Kilpatrick about Kilpatrick's Project method.

Zirbes coauthored many articles with William S. Gray. Her dissertation made her one of the country's experts on teaching children to read. She never really considered herself an expert at reading because she did not believe in isolating one subject from other subjects. Zirbes founded the laboratory school at Ohio State, this school continued under her influence for over thirty years. She believed children learned things best when their interest was high. Zirbes supported the child-centered approach only if the teacher had a good understanding of the skills they wanted the children to learn, and carefully lead their class in that direction. The next step in learning was to provide good learning experiences that would enlarge children's understanding and their vocabulary.

Zirbes believed that numerous other elements contribute to learning. The first, that the lesson should be meaningful to the child, and second, that learning should be intrinsically motivating. The final two elements of learning, as Zirbes saw it, were that the lesson should stimulate thinking and lastly it should be integrated with other subjects. As Zirbes neared retirement, critics like Arthur Bestor attacked her beliefs on education. Her answer to this criticism came in the form of a book, Spurs to Creative Teaching (1959).
