= Blohm & Voss P 196 =

P 196

General information
- Type: Dive bomber and close support
- Manufacturer: Blohm & Voss
- Designer: Richard Vogt
- Status: Design project

The Blohm & Voss P 196 was the last of Blohm & Voss's World War II design projects for a "stuka" dive bomber and close support aircraft to replace the aging Junkers Ju 87.

== Design ==
Twin BMW 003 engines were slung in pods under the fuselage center section. To make room for the main undercarriage twin tail booms were attached to the straight, tapered wings, with the undercarriage retracting into the front of the booms. The tailplane was raised midway up the twin tail fins to clear the jet exhaust, with twin tailwheels retracting beneath.

Up to two 500 kilograms (1,100 lb) bombs could be carried in bays within the tail booms. Forward-firing armament comprised two MK 412 cannon and two MG-151 guns.

== Specification ==
Data from Masters (1982).

General characteristics

- Length: 11.7 m (38 ft 5 in)
- Wingspan: 15.0 m (49 ft 3 in)
- Gross weight: 9,000 kg (19,842 lb)
- Powerplant: 2 × BMW 003 turbojet, 7.8 kN (1,800 lbf) thrust (800 kg) each
