= List of aircraft of World War II =

The list of aircraft of World War II includes all of the aircraft used by countries that were at war during World War II from the period between when the country joined the war and the time the country withdrew from it, or when the war ended. Aircraft developed but not used operationally in the war are in the prototypes section at the bottom of the page. Prototypes for aircraft that entered service under a different design number are ignored in favor of the version that entered service. If the date of an aircraft's entry into service or first flight is not known, the aircraft will be listed by its name, the country of origin, or major wartime users. Aircraft used for multiple roles are generally only listed under their primary role unless specialized versions were built for other roles in significant numbers. Aircraft used by neutral countries such as Argentina , Switzerland, and Sweden (or countries which did not engage in significant fighting, such as most of those in South America) are not included.

== Fighter aircraft ==
=== Biplane fighters ===
Type	Origin	Introduced	Total	Operators
Armstrong Whitworth Scimitar	United Kingdom	1936	6	Norway (4 as trainers)
Avia B-534	Czechoslovakia	1935	568	Bulgaria, Germany, Greece, Slovakia
Avia BH-33	Czechoslovakia (Note: Not in combat service by time of entry into WWII)	1927	180	Poland Yugoslavia
Blériot-SPAD S.510	France	1936	61	
Boeing P-12	United States	1930	586	Brazil, China, Philippines, Thailand
Bristol Bulldog	United Kingdom	1929	443	Denmark, Finland
Caproni Ca.114	Italy	1933	36	Peru
Curtiss F11C Goshawk	United States	1932	30	China
Curtiss BF2C Goshawk	United States	1933	166	China, Thailand
Fairey Firefly IIM	United Kingdom	1929	91	Belgium
Fiat CR.30	Italy	1932	176	Austria, China, Germany, Hungary, Italy
Fiat CR.32	Italy	1934	1,052	Hungary, China
Fiat CR.42 Falco	Italy	1939	1,817	Hungary, Belgium, Germany, Croatia
Gloster Gamecock	United Kingdom	1926	108	Finland
Gloster Gauntlet	United Kingdom	1935	246	Denmark, Finland
Gloster Gladiator	United Kingdom	1937	747	Belgium, Finland, Greece, Iraq, Lithuania, Norway
Grumman FF	United States	1933	116	Canada
Grumman F2F	United States	1935	55	
Grumman F3F	United States	1936	147	
Hawker Demon	United Kingdom	1933	305	Australia
Hawker Fury	United Kingdom	1931	275	Yugoslavia, South Africa
Hawker Nimrod	United Kingdom	1933	92	Denmark
Heinkel He 51	Germany	1935	700	Bulgaria
IMAM Ro.44	Italy	1937	35	
Kawasaki Ki-10	Japan	1935	588	
Kochyerigin DI-6	Soviet Union	1934	222	
Koolhoven F.K.52	Netherlands	1939	6	Finland (2 aircraft)
Polikarpov I-5	Soviet Union	1931	803	
Polikarpov I-15	Soviet Union	1934	3,313	China, Finland
Polikarpov I-153	Soviet Union	1939	3,437	China, Finland

=== Fighters and fighter bombers ===
This table includes single-engined and single-seat fighters and ground attack aircraft

Type	Origin	Introduced	Total	Operators
AEKKEA-RAAB R-29	Greece	1937	30	Spain
Ambrosini SAI.207	Italy	1942	14	
Ansaldo A.120	Italy	1925	77	Lithuania
Arsenal VG-33	France	1940	50	
Avia B-135	Czechoslovakia	1941	12	Bulgaria
Bell P-39 Airacobra	United States	1941	9,588	Australia, France, Soviet Union, United Kingdom
Bell P-63 Kingcobra	United States	1943	3,303	Soviet Union
Bloch MB.150	France	1940	683	Greece, Romania
Boeing P-26 Peashooter	United States	1933	151	China, Philippines
Breda Ba.27	Italy (Note: Production only, not used by manufacturing nation)	1933	14	China
Brewster F2A Buffalo	United States	1939	509	Australia, Finland, Netherlands, New Zealand, United Kingdom
Caudron C.714	France	1940	90	Finland, exile Poland forces
CAC Boomerang	Australia	1943	250	
Curtiss P-36	United States	1938	1,115	Brazil, Finland, France, Netherlands, Norway, Thailand, United Kingdom
Curtiss P-40 Warhawk	United States	1939	13,738	Australia, Brazil, Canada, China, Finland, New Zealand, South Africa, Soviet Union, United Kingdom
Curtiss CW-21	United States	1939	62	China, Netherlands
Dewoitine D.371	France	1931	89	France, Germany, Spain
Dewoitine D.500/D.510	France	1935	381	China, Lithuania
Dewoitine D.520	France	1940	900	Bulgaria, Italy
Fiat G.50 Freccia	Italy	1938	683	Finland, Croatia
Fiat G.55 Centauro	Italy	1943	349	
Focke-Wulf Fw 190	Germany	1941	23,823	Hungary
Focke-Wulf Ta 152	Germany	1945	69	
Fokker D.XXI	Netherlands	1936	148	Denmark, Finland, Netherlands
Grumman F4F Wildcat	United States	1940	7,885	United Kingdom
Grumman F6F Hellcat	United States	1943	12,275	United Kingdom
Grumman F8F Bearcat	United States	1945	1,265	
Hawker Hurricane	United Kingdom	1937	14,487	Belgium, Canada, Finland, France, Greece, British India, New Zealand, Soviet Union
Hawker Tempest	United Kingdom	1944	1,702	New Zealand
Hawker Typhoon	United Kingdom	1940	3,317	Canada, New Zealand
Heinkel He 112	Germany	1937	102	Romania, Hungary
IAR 80	Romania	1941	450	
Ilyushin Il-2	Soviet Union	1939	36,183	
Ikarus IK-2	Yugoslavia	1935	12	Croatia
Kawanishi N1K Kyōfū	Japan	1943	97	
Kawanishi N1K-J Shiden	Japan	1943	1,413	
Kawasaki Ki-61	Japan	1942	3,078	
Kawasaki Ki-100	Japan	1945	396	
Koolhoven F.K.58	Netherlands	1940	20	France
Lavochkin-Gorbunov-Gudkov LaGG-1	Soviet Union	1940	100	
Lavochkin-Gorbunov-Gudkov LaGG-3	Soviet Union	1941	6,528	Finland
Lavochkin La-5	Soviet Union	1942	9,920	
Lavochkin La-7	Soviet Union	1944	5,753	
Loire 46	France	1936	61	
Macchi C.200	Italy	1939	1,513	
Macchi C.202	Italy	1941	1,150	Croatia, Germany
Macchi C.205	Italy	1943	262	Croatia, Germany
MÁVAG Héja	Hungary	1941	204	
Messerschmitt Bf 109	Germany	1937	34,248	Bulgaria, Finland, Hungary, Italy, Romania, Yugoslavia
Mikoyan-Gurevich MiG-1	Soviet Union	1940	103	
Mikoyan-Gurevich MiG-3	Soviet Union	1941	3,422	
Mitsubishi A5M	Japan	1936	1,094	
Mitsubishi A6M	Japan	1940	10,939	
Mitsubishi J2M Raiden	Japan	1942	621	
Morane-Saulnier M.S.406	France	1939	1,176	Croatia, Finland, Italy, Poland
Nakajima A6M2-N	Japan	1942	327	
Nakajima Ki-27	Japan	1937	3,368	Manchukuo, Thailand
Nakajima Ki-43	Japan	1941	5,919	Manchukuo, Thailand
Nakajima Ki-44	Japan	1942	1,225	
Nakajima Ki-84	Japan	1943	3,514	
North American P-51 Mustang	United States	1942	15,588	Australia, Canada, China, France, South Africa, Soviet Union, United Kingdom
Polikarpov I-16	Soviet Union	1934	10,292	China, Finland
PZL P.7	Poland	1933	151	
PZL P.11	Poland	1934	325	Romania
PZL P.24	Poland	1936	184	Bulgaria, Greece, Romania
Reggiane Re.2000	Italy	1940	186	Hungary
Reggiane Re.2001	Italy	1941	237	
Reggiane Re.2005	Italy	1943	48	Germany
Republic P-43 Lancer	United States	1941	272	Australia, China
Republic P-47 Thunderbolt	United States	1942	15,636	Brazil, France, Mexico, Soviet Union, United Kingdom
Rogožarski IK-3	Yugoslavia	1940	13	
Seversky P-35	United States	1937	196	Philippines
Supermarine Seafire	United Kingdom	1942	2,646	
Supermarine Spitfire	United Kingdom	1938	20,381	Australia, Canada, France, India, Italy, New Zealand, Norway, South Africa, Soviet Union, United States
VL Myrsky	Finland	1943	51	
Vought F4U Corsair	United States	1942	12,571	United Kingdom, New Zealand
Vultee P-66 Vanguard	United States	1941	146	China
Yakovlev Yak-1	Soviet Union	1940	8,700	France
Yakovlev Yak-3	Soviet Union	1944	4,848	France
Yakovlev Yak-7	Soviet Union	1942	6,399	France
Yakovlev Yak-9	Soviet Union	1942	16,769	France

=== Heavy fighters (multi-engined or multi-seat), night fighters, dive bombers and torpedo bombers ===
Type	Origin	Introduced	Total	Operators
Blackburn Roc	United Kingdom	1939	136	
Blackburn Skua	United Kingdom	1938	192	
Boulton Paul Defiant	United Kingdom	1939	1,064	Canada, Polish exile forces
Bristol Beaufighter	United Kingdom	1940	5,928	Australia, Canada, South Africa, United States
Bristol Blenheim	United Kingdom	1937	4,422	Canada
De Havilland Mosquito	United Kingdom	1941	7,781	Australia, Canada, New Zealand, United States
Dornier Do 215	Germany	1939	105	Hungary
Dornier Do 217	Germany	1941	1,925	Italy
Dornier Do 335	Germany	1944	37	
Fairey Firefly	United Kingdom	1941	1,072	
Fairey Fulmar	United Kingdom	1940	600	
Focke-Wulf Ta 154	Germany	1944	28	
Fokker G.I	Netherlands	1939	63	
Grumman F7F Tigercat	United States	1944	364	
Heinkel He 219	Germany	1943	300	
IMAM Ro.57	Italy	1943	51	
Junkers Ju 88	Germany	1940	15,183	
Junkers Ju 388	Germany	1944	100	
Kawasaki Ki-45	Japan	1942	1,701	
Kawasaki Ki-102	Japan	1945	238	
Lockheed P-38 Lightning	United States	1941	10,037	China
Messerschmitt Bf 110	Germany	1937	6,170	Croatia, Hungary, Italy, Iraq, Romania
Messerschmitt Me 210	Germany	1943	357	Hungary
Messerschmitt Me 410	Germany	1943	1,189	Hungary
Mitsubishi Ki-109	Japan	1945	22	
Nakajima J1N Gekkō	Japan	1942	479	
Northrop P-61 Black Widow	United States	1944	706	
Petlyakov Pe-3	Soviet Union	1941	360	Finland
Potez 630	France	1938	1,395	Greece, Romania
Westland Welkin	United Kingdom	1944	77	
Westland Whirlwind	United Kingdom	1940	114	

=== Jet- and rocket-propelled fighters ===
Type	Origin	Introduced	Total	Operators
Bell P-59 Airacomet	United States	1944	66	
Gloster Meteor	United Kingdom	1944	3,947 (Note: Total production to 1955)	
Heinkel He 162	Germany	1945	320	
Lockheed P-80 Shooting Star	United States	1945	1,715 (Note: total production to 1950)	
Messerschmitt Me 163 Komet	Germany	1944	370	
Messerschmitt Me 262	Germany	1944	1,430	
Ryan FR Fireball	United States (Note: Used as trainers)	1945	71	

== Bomber and attack aircraft ==
=== Heavy and strategic bombers ===
Type	Origin	Introduced	Total	Operators
Avro Lancaster	United Kingdom	1942	7,377	Australia, Canada
Avro Manchester	United Kingdom	1940	202	
Boeing B-17 Flying Fortress	United States	1938	12,731	Canada, United Kingdom
Boeing B-29 Superfortress	United States	1944	3,970	
Consolidated B-24 Liberator	United States	1940	18,188	Australia, Canada, China, United Kingdom
Consolidated B-32 Dominator	United States	1942	118	
Dornier Do 217	Germany	1941	1,925	Italy
Focke-Wulf Fw 200 Condor (maritime patrol)	Germany	1940	276	
Handley Page Halifax	United Kingdom	1940	6,176	Australia, Canada, France
Heinkel He 177	Germany	1943	1,169	
Petlyakov Pe-8	Soviet Union	1940	93	
Piaggio P.108	Italy	1942	37	
Short Stirling	United Kingdom	1940	2,371	
Tupolev TB-3	Soviet Union	1932	818	
Vickers Warwick	United Kingdom	1942	846	
Yermolayev Yer-2	Soviet Union	1941	365	

=== Medium bombers and maritime patrol ===
Type	Origin	Introduced	Total	Operators
Arado Ar 234	Germany	1944	214	
Arkhangelsky Ar-2	Soviet Union	1940	190	
Armstrong Whitworth Whitley	United Kingdom	1937	1,814	
Avia F.39	Czechoslovakia	1932	18	
Amiot 143	France	1936	138	
Amiot 354	France	1940	86	France, Germany
Bloch MB.200	France	1935	332	Bulgaria, Czechoslovakia
Bloch MB.210	France	1937	300	
CANT Z.1007	Italy	1938	660	
Caproni Ca.135	Italy	1937	140	Hungary
Consolidated PB4Y-2 Privateer	United States	1943	739	
de Havilland Mosquito	United Kingdom	1941	7,781	Australia, Canada, New Zealand, Norway, South Africa
Dornier Do 11	Germany	1932	372	Bulgaria
Dornier Do 17	Germany	1937	2,139	Bulgaria, Finland, Yugoslavia
Dornier Do 215	Germany	1939	105	
Douglas A-20 Havoc	United States	1941	7,478 (Note: Total produced across all roles)	Australia, Brazil, Canada, France, Netherlands, South Africa, Soviet Union, United Kingdom
Douglas A-26 Invader	United States	1944	2,503	United Kingdom
Douglas B-18 Bolo	United States	1936	350	Brazil, Canada
Douglas B-23 Dragon	United States	1939	38	
Farman F.220	France	1936	80	
Fiat BR.20	Italy	1938	500	Hungary
Fokker T.V	Netherlands	1938	16	
Handley Page Hampden	United Kingdom	1938	1,430	Canada, Soviet Union
Heinkel He 111	Germany	1936	5,656	Germany, Bulgaria, China, Hungary, Romania, Slovakia
IAR 79	Romania	1941	72	
Ilyushin DB-3	Soviet Union	1936	1,528	China, Finland
Ilyushin Il-4	Soviet Union	1939	5,256	Finland
Junkers Ju 86	Germany	1936	900	Hungary, South Africa
Junkers Ju 88	Germany	1938	15,183	Finland, Hungary, Italy, Romania, France, Soviet Union
Junkers Ju 188	Germany	1943	1,234	Hungary
Keystone B-3A	United States	1926	63	Philippines
Lioré et Olivier LeO 451	France	1939	561	
Lisunov Li-2	Soviet Union	1939	4,937	
Lockheed Ventura	United States	1942	3,028	Australia, Brazil, Canada, New Zealand, South Africa, United Kingdom
Martin B-10	United States	1934	348	China, Netherlands, Philippines, Thailand
Martin B-26 Marauder	United States	1941	5,288	France, South Africa, United Kingdom
Martin Baltimore	United States	1941	1,575	Australia France, Greece, Co-Belligerent Italy, South Africa, United Kingdom
Martin Maryland	United States	1939	450	France, South Africa, United Kingdom
Mitsubishi Ki-21	Japan	1938	2,064	Japan, Thailand
North American B-25 Mitchell	United States	1941	9,816	Australia, Brazil, Canada, China, France, Netherlands, United Kingdom, Soviet Union
Nakajima Ki-49	Japan	1938	819	
Petlyakov Pe-2	Soviet Union	1941	11,070	Finland
Piaggio P.108	Italy	1942	50	Germany (Note: Transport version only)
PZL.37 Łoś	Poland	1938	120	Germany, Romania
Savoia-Marchetti SM.79	Italy	1937	1,240	Iraq, Romania, Yugoslavia, Greece
Savoia-Marchetti SM.81	Italy	1935	535	
Savoia-Marchetti SM.84	Italy	1941	329	
Tupolev TB-1	Soviet Union	1929	218	
Tupolev Tu-2	Soviet Union	1944	2,257	
Vickers Wellington	United Kingdom	1938	11,462	Australia, Canada, France, South Africa
Yokosuka P1Y Ginga	Japan	1945	1,102	

=== Light bombers, ground attack, tactical reconnaissance and observation aircraft ===
Type	Origin	Introduced	Total	Operators
Aero A.32	Czechoslovakia	1928	116	Finland
Aero A.100	Czechoslovakia	1933	44	
Aero A.304	Czechoslovakia	1937	19	Bulgaria, Germany
ANBO IV	Lithuania	1932	34	Germany, Soviet Union
ANF Les Mureaux 113	France	1933	285	
Armstrong Whitworth Atlas	United Kingdom (Note: Out of service by time of entry into WWII)	1927	478	Canada
Avro Anson	United Kingdom	1936	11,020	Canada, Egypt, Finland, Greece, India, Iran, Iraq, Netherlands, Turkey
Blackburn Ripon	United Kingdom	1929	92	Finland
Blackburn Shark	United Kingdom	1935	269	Canada
Blackburn Botha	United Kingdom	1939	580	
Bloch MB.131	France	1938	143	
Bloch MB.170	France	1940	88	
Blohm & Voss BV 142	Germany	1940	4	
Breda Ba.64	Italy	1937	42	
Breda Ba.65	Italy	1937	218	Iraq
Breda Ba.88	Italy	1938	149	
Breguet 19	France	1924	2,700	Belgium, Croatia, Greece, Poland, Yugoslavia
Bréguet 270	France	1930	227	China
Breguet 693	France	1939	230	
Bristol Beaufort	United Kingdom	1940	1,821	Australia, Canada, New Zealand, South Africa
Bristol Blenheim	United Kingdom	1937	4,422	Canada, Finland, France, Greece, Yugoslavia
Caproni Ca.309	Italy	1937	243	Bulgaria
Caproni Ca.310	Italy	1938	312	Croatia, France, Hungary, Norway, Yugoslavia
Caproni Ca.311	Italy	1938	335	Croatia, Yugoslavia
Caproni Ca.313	Italy	1938	271	Croatia, France, Germany, Norway
Caproni Ca.314	Italy	1938	425	Hungary
Curtiss A-12 Shrike	United States	1933	46	
Curtiss A-18 Shrike	United States	1936	13	
Curtiss Falcon	United States	1928	488	Philippines
Curtiss O-52 Owl	United States	1940	203	Soviet Union
DAR 3	Bulgaria	1937	24	
Douglas O-43	United States	1933	24	
Douglas O-46	United States	1936	90	Philippines
Fairey Battle	United Kingdom	1937	2,201	Australia, Belgium, Canada, Greece
Fairey Fox	United Kingdom	1932	200	Belgium
Fairey Gordon	United Kingdom	1931	186	New Zealand
Fairey IIIF	United Kingdom	1926	964	Greece
Focke-Wulf Fw 189	Germany	1941	864	Bulgaria, Hungary, Romania
Fokker C.V	Netherlands	1924	955	Denmark, Finland, Hungary, Norway
Fokker C.VIII	Netherlands	1928	10	
Fokker C.X	Netherlands	1932	74	Finland
Hawker Hart	United Kingdom	1928		Finland
Hawker Audax/Nisr/Hartebees	United Kingdom	1931		India, Iraq, Persia, South Africa
Hawker Hector	United Kingdom	1936	179	
Hawker Hind	United Kingdom	1935	528	New Zealand
Hawker Horsley	United Kingdom	1927	124	Denmark, Greece
Heinkel He 45	Germany	1931	512	Bulgaria, Hungary
Heinkel He 46	Germany	1931	500	Hungary
Heinkel He 50	Germany	1935	78	
Henschel Hs 123	Germany	1936	250	
Henschel Hs 126	Germany	1937		Croatia, Estonia, Greece
Henschel Hs 129	Germany	1938	865	Hungary, Romania
IAR 37	Romania	1938	380	
Ilyushin Il-2	Soviet Union	1941	36,183	
Ilyushin Il-10	Soviet Union	1944	6,166	
IMAM Ro.37	Italy	1935	617	Hungary
Junkers Ju 52	Germany	1932	4,845	
Junkers Ju 87	Germany	1937	6,000	Italy, Hungary, Bulgaria
Kaproni Bulgarski KB-11	Bulgaria	1941		
Kawasaki Ki-32	Japan	1938	854	Manchukuo
Kawasaki Ki-48	Japan	1940	1,997	
Kharkov KhAI-5	Soviet Union	1936	500	
Kyūshū Q1W Tōkai	Japan	1945	153	
Letov Š-16	Czechoslovakia	1928	89	Latvia, Turkey
Letov Š-28	Czechoslovakia	1934	412	Bulgaria, Germany, Slovakia, Lithuania
Lockheed Hudson	United States	1939	2,941	Australia, Brazil, Canada, Netherlands, New Zealand, United Kingdom
Lublin R-XIII	Poland	1932	273	Romania
RWD-14 Czapla	Poland	1939	65	Romania
Mitsubishi G3M	Japan	1937	1,048	
Mitsubishi G4M	Japan	1941	2,435	
Mitsubishi Ki-30	Japan	1938	704	Thailand
Mitsubishi Ki-51	Japan	1939	2,385	
Mitsubishi Ki-67	Japan	1942	767	
North American A-36 Apache	United States	1942	500	
North American O-47	United States	1934	239	
Northrop A-17	United States	1935	411	South Africa, Canada, France, Iraq, Netherlands, Norway, United Kingdom
Orlogsværftet O-Maskinen	Denmark	1926	15	
Polikarpov Po-2	Soviet Union	1929	20,000	Finland
Polikarpov R-5	Soviet Union	1931	7,000	
Polikarpov R-Z	Soviet Union	1935	1,031	
Potez 25	France	1925	4,000	Greece, Yugoslavia, Poland
Potez 540	France	1934	192	
PZL.23 Karaś	Poland	1936	250	Romania, Bulgaria
PZL.43	Poland	1936	54	Germany, Bulgaria
Reggiane Re.2002	Italy	1941	225	Germany
Rogožarski R-100	Yugoslavia	1938	26	Croatia
Renard R.31	Belgium	1935	43	
Boripatra	Siam	1927	12	
Saab 17	Sweden	1940	326	Denmark
Savoia-Marchetti SM.85	Italy	1939	34	
Sukhoi Su-2	Soviet Union	1937	910	
Tachikawa Ki-36	Japan	1938	1,334	Japan, Thailand
Thomas-Morse O-19	United States	1929	176	Philippines
Tupolev SB	Soviet Union	1934	6,656	Bulgaria, China, Czechoslovakia, Finland
Vickers Vildebeest	United Kingdom	1933	406	New Zealand
Vickers Wellesley	United Kingdom	1937	177	
VL Kotka	Finland	1931	5	
Vought O2U Corsair	United States	1926	580	Brazil, China, Thailand
Vultee Vengeance	United States	1942	1,931	Australia, Brazil, France, India, United Kingdom
Vultee V-11	United States	1939	175	Brazil, China, Soviet Union
Weiss WM-16	Hungary	1936		
Weiss WM-21 Sólyom	Hungary	1938	128	
Westland Lysander	United Kingdom	1936	1,786	Canada, France, Finland, India, United States
Westland Wapiti	United Kingdom	1928	586	Australia, Canada, India
Westland Wallace	United Kingdom	1933	173	
Yakovlev Yak-4	Soviet Union	1941	90	

=== Carrier-based naval bombers ===
Type	Origin	Role	Introduced	Total	Operators
Aichi B7A Ryūsei	Japan	torpedo/dive bomber	1945	114	
Aichi D1A (Note: Retired 1942)	Japan	dive bomber	1934	590	
Aichi D3A	Japan	dive bomber	1937	1,445	
Blackburn Skua	United Kingdom	fighter/dive bomber	1938	192	
Brewster SB2A Buccaneer	United States	dive bomber	1941	771	United Kingdom
Consolidated TBY Sea Wolf	United States	torpedo bomber	1944	181	
Curtiss SB2C Helldiver	United States	dive bomber	1943	7,140	Australia, United Kingdom
Curtiss SBC Helldiver	United States	dive bomber	1938	257	France, United Kingdom
Douglas DT (Note: Retired by US before war)	United States	torpedo bomber	1921	90	Norway
Douglas SBD Dauntless	United States	dive bomber	1940	5,936	New Zealand
Douglas TBD Devastator	United States	torpedo bomber	1935	130	
Fairey Albacore	United Kingdom	torpedo/dive bomber	1940	800	Canada
Fairey Barracuda	United Kingdom	torpedo/dive bomber	1942	2,602	
Fairey Swordfish	United Kingdom	torpedo bomber	1936	2,391	Canada
Fieseler Fi 167	Germany	torpedo/reconnaissance bomber	1940	14	Croatia, Romania
Grumman TBF Avenger	United States	torpedo bomber	1942	9,839	New Zealand, United Kingdom
Loire-Nieuport LN.401	France	dive bomber	1939	68	
Mitsubishi B5M	Japan	torpedo bomber	1937	125	
Nakajima B5N	Japan	torpedo bomber	1938	1,149	
Nakajima B6N Tenzan	Japan	torpedo bomber	1942	1,268	
Naval Aircraft Factory SBN	United States	dive bomber	1941	30	
Northrop BT	United States	dive bomber	1935	55	
SB2U Vindicator/Chesapeake	United States	dive bomber	1937	260	France, United Kingdom
Yokosuka B4Y	Japan	torpedo bomber	1936	205	
Yokosuka D4Y Suisei	Japan	dive bomber/night fighter	1942	2,038	

== Strategic and photo-reconnaissance aircraft ==
Strategic and photo-reconnaissance aircraft were frequently specially modified variants of high performance aircraft, usually fighters or bombers.

Type	Origin	Introduced	Total	Operators
Arado Ar 234	Germany	1944	214	
Boeing F-9/RB-17 Flying Fortress	United States	1940		
Consolidated F-7 Liberator	United States	1940		
de Havilland Mosquito PR variants	United Kingdom	1941		Canada, United States
Dornier Do 17Z-3	Germany	1937		Yugoslavia
Dornier Do 215B-0/1/4	Germany	1939		
Dornier Do 217A-0	Germany	1941		
Douglas F-3 Havoc	United States	1941		
Fiat CR.25	Italy	1940		
Focke-Wulf Fw 190A-3/U4, A-4/U4 & A-5/U4	Germany	1941		
Focke-Wulf Ta 152H-1-0	Germany	1945		
Heinkel He 70K/170	Germany	1937		Hungary
Junkers Ju 86P	Germany	1936		
Junkers Ju 88D & T	Germany	1939		
Junkers Ju 188D & F	Germany	1943		
Lockheed F-4 and F-5 Lightning	United States	1941		Australia, France, Italy
Messerschmitt Bf 109E-5/F-6/G-4	Germany	1937		
Messerschmitt Bf 110C-5/E-3/F-3	Germany	1937		
Messerschmitt Me 210B	Germany	1943		
Messerschmitt Me 262A-1a/U3	Germany	1944		
Messerschmitt Me 410A-1/U-1, A-2/U-1 & A-3	Germany	1943		
Mitsubishi Ki-15/C5M	Japan	1937		
Mitsubishi Ki-46	Japan	1941		
Nakajima C6N Saiun	Japan	1944		
Nakajima J1N1-C Gekkō	Japan	1942		
North American F-6 Mustang	United States	1942		France
Potez 63.11	France	1939		
PWS-10 (Note: Obsolete fighter used for reconnaissance)	Poland	1932		
Supermarine Spitfire PR variants	United Kingdom	1938		Soviet Union, United States, and others
Yakovlev Yak-9R	Soviet Union	1942		

== Seaplanes ==
=== Flying boats ===
Type	Origin	Introduced	Total	Operators
Aichi E10A	Japan	1934	15	
Aichi E11A	Japan	1937	17	
Aichi H9A	Japan	1942	31	
Beriev MBR-2	Soviet Union	1935	1,365	
Blohm & Voss BV 138	Germany	1940	297	
Blohm & Voss BV 222	Germany	1941	13	
Boeing 314/C-98 Clipper	United States	1939	12	
Bréguet 521 Bizerte	France	1935	37	Germany
CAMS 37	France	1926	332	
CAMS 55	France	1930	112	
Canadian Vickers Vancouver	Canada	1930	6	
Canadian Vickers Vedette	Canada	1925	60	
CANT Z.501	Italy	1935	454	Romania
Chyetverikov MDR-6	Soviet Union	1941	27	
Consolidated PBY/PBN/PBV/OA-10 Catalina/Canso (Note: Also built in Canada)	United States	1935	3,308	Australia, Brazil, Canada, France, Norway, Soviet Union, United Kingdom
Consolidated P2Y	United States	1929	78	Argentina
Consolidated PB2Y Coronado	United States	1937	217	United Kingdom
Dornier Do 18	Germany	1938	170	
Dornier Do 24	Germany	1937	279	Australia, Netherlands
Dornier Do 26	Germany	1938	6	
Dornier Do J Wal	Germany	1922	250	Denmark
Douglas Dolphin	United States	1931	558	Australia
Grumman JRF Goose	United States	1937	345	Brazil, Canada, United Kingdom
Grumman J4F Widgeon/Gosling	United States	1940	317	Brazil, United Kingdom
Grumman J2F Duck	United States	1936	584	
Hall PH	United States	1931	24	
Ikarus IO	Yugoslavia	1926	38	
Ikarus ŠM	Yugoslavia	1924	42	
Kawanishi E11K	Japan	1937	2	
Kawanishi H6K	Japan	1938	215	
Kawanishi H8K	Japan	1942	167	
Latécoère 302	France	1932	7	
Latécoère 521-523	France	1935	5	
Latécoère 611 (Note: Prototype used operationally)	France	1940	1	
Latécoère 631	France	1942	10	Germany
Lioré et Olivier LeO H-47	France	1937	6	
Lioré et Olivier LeO H-242	France	1929	15	Italy
Lioré et Olivier LeO H-246	France	1939	6	Germany
Loire 70	France	1937	8	
Loire 130	France	1937	125	
Loire 501	France	1933	7	
Macchi M.C.100	Italy	1940	3	
Martin M-130	United States	1934	3	
Martin JRM Mars	United States	1943	7	
Martin PBM Mariner	United States	1940	1,366	Australia, Netherlands, United Kingdom
Potez 141	France	1938	1	Germany
Potez-CAMS 161	France	1938	1	Germany
Potez 452	France	1936	16	
RAS-1 Getta	Romania	1925	4	
Saro Lerwick	United Kingdom	1940	21	
Saro London	United Kingdom	1936	31	
Savoia-Marchetti S.55	Italy	1926	243	Romania
Savoia-Marchetti S.62bis	Italy	1926		Romania
Savoia-Marchetti S.66	Italy	1931	24	
Shavrov Sh-2	Soviet Union	1934	700	Finland
Short Empire	United Kingdom	1936	42	Australia, New Zealand
Short S.26	United Kingdom	1940	3	
Short S.25 Hythe/Sandringham	United Kingdom	1942	37	New Zealand
Short Singapore	United Kingdom	1935		New Zealand
Short Sunderland	United Kingdom	1938	749	Australia, Canada, France, New Zealand, Norway
Sikorsky S-40	United States	1931	3	
Sikorsky S-42	United States	1934	10	
Sikorsky JRS-1/OA-8	United States	1935	53	
Sikorsky VS-44/JR2S-1	United States	1937	3	
Sud-Est SE.200 Amphitrite (Note: Not used by France during the war)	France	1942	2	Germany
Supermarine Sea Otter	United Kingdom	1942	292	
Supermarine Stranraer	United Kingdom	1937	57	Canada
Supermarine Walrus	United Kingdom	1935	740	Australia, Canada, France, New Zealand
Tupolev MTB-1	Soviet Union	1929	15	
Yokosuka H5Y	Japan	1939	20	

=== Floatplanes ===
Type	Origin	Introduced	Total	Operators
Aichi E13A	Japan	1941	1,418	Thailand
Aichi E16A Zuiun	Japan	1944	256	
Aichi M6A Seiran (Note: Submarine-borne aircraft)	Japan	1945	28	
Arado Ar 95	Germany	1936	42	
Arado Ar 196	Germany	1938	541	Bulgaria, Finland, Norway, USSR
Arado Ar 199 trainer	Germany	1939	31	
Arado Ar 231	Germany	1941	6	
Beriev Be-2	Soviet Union	1938	12	
Beriev Be-4	Soviet Union	1942	47	
Besson MB.411	France	1935	2	
CANT Z.506	Italy	1936	354	
CANT Z.515	Italy	1940	11	
Curtiss SC Seahawk	United States	1944	577	
Curtiss SO3C Seamew	United States	1942	795	United Kingdom
Curtiss SOC Seagull	United States	1935	322	
Dornier Do 22	Germany	1938	30	Finland, Greece, Yugoslavia
Fairey Seafox	United Kingdom	1937	66	
Fairey Swordfish	United Kingdom	1936	2,391	
Farman NC.470	France	1938	35	
Fiat RS.14	Italy	1941	186	
Fokker C.XI-W	Netherlands	1935	14	
Fokker C.XIV-W	Netherlands	1937	24	
Fokker T.IV	Netherlands	1927	33	
Fokker T.VIII	Netherlands	1938	36	Germany, United Kingdom
Gourdou-Leseurre GL-810-813 HY	France	1930	86	
Gourdou-Leseurre GL-832 HY	France	1930	22	
Heinkel HE 8 (Note: Not used by Germany)	Germany	1927	22	Denmark
Heinkel He 42 floatplane trainer	Germany	1929		Bulgaria
Heinkel He 59	Germany	1935	142	Finland
Heinkel He 60	Germany	1933	361	Bulgaria
Heinkel He 114	Germany	1939		Romania
Heinkel He 115	Germany	1939	138	Finland, Norway, UK
IMAM Ro.43	Italy	1935	193	
IMAM Ro.44	Italy	1936	35	
Kawanishi E7K	Japan	1935	533	
Kawanishi N1K Kyōfū	Japan	1944	1,532	
Latécoère 290	France	1934	35	
Latécoère 298	France	1938	121	Germany
Levasseur PL.15	France	1933	17	
Lioré et Olivier LeO H-43	France	1940	21	
Lublin R.VIII floatplane trainer	Poland	1928	6	
Marinens Flyvebaatfabrikk/Høver M.F.8 floatplane trainer	Norway	1924	8	
Marinens Flyvebaatfabrikk/Høver M.F.10	Norway	1929	4	
Marinens Flyvebaatfabrikk/Høver M.F.11 floatplane trainer	Norway	1932	29	Finland
Mitsubishi F1M	Japan	1941	944	
Nakajima A6M2-N	Japan	1942	327	
Nakajima E8N	Japan	1935	755	Thailand
Northrop Delta	United States	1936	32	Canada
Northrop N-3PB	United States	1940	24	Norway
Rogožarski SIM-XII-H	Yugoslavia	1938	9	
Rogožarski SIM-XIV-H	Yugoslavia	1939	19	
VL Sääski floatplane trainer	Finland	1928	38	
Vought OS2U Kingfisher	United States	1938	1,519	Australia, United Kingdom
Watanabe E9W	Japan	1938	35	
Watanabe K6W/WS-103	Japan	1938		Thailand
Yokosuka E14Y	Japan	1941	126	
Yokosuka K4Y	Japan	1933	211	

== Transport aircraft ==
=== Transport planes ===
Type	Origin	Introduced	Total	Operators
Aeronca L-3	United States	1941		Brazil
Airspeed Envoy	United Kingdom	1934	52	Finland, South Africa
Arado Ar 232	Germany	1943	20	
Armstrong Whitworth Albemarle	United Kingdom	1940	602	Soviet Union
AVIA FL.3	Italy	1939	336	Croatia, Germany
Avro 652	United Kingdom	1935	2	
Avro Lancastrian	United Kingdom	1945	91	
Avro York	United Kingdom	1944	262	
Barkley-Grow T8P-1	United States	1937	11	Canada
Beechcraft 17 Staggerwing/UC-43 Traveler	United States	1933	785	Australia, Brazil, Finland, New Zealand, United Kingdom
Beechcraft Model 18/C-45/JRB/Expeditor (Note: Also used as a trainer and photo reconnaissance.)	United States	1937	9,000	Brazil, Canada, France, Philippines, United Kingdom
Bellanca Aircruiser	United States	1930	23	Canada, Mexico, Philippines
Beneš-Mráz Be-555 Super Bibi	Czechoslovakia	1936	18	
Bloch MB.81 ambulance aircraft	France	1935	21	
Bloch MB.120 mailplane	France	1935	11	
Boeing 247/UC-73	United States	1933	75	Canada, United Kingdom
Boeing C-75 Stratoliner	United States	1940	10	
Boeing C-108 Flying Fortress	United States	1943	4	
Breda Ba.44	Italy	1934	6	
Bristol Bombay bomber/transport	United Kingdom	1939	51	
Bristol Buckingham	United Kingdom	1943	119	
Budd RB Conestoga	United States	1944	20	
CAP CAP-4 Paulista	Brazil	1935	1,149	
Caproni Ca.111	Italy	1932	154	
Caproni Ca.133	Italy	1935	506	
Caproni Ca.148	Italy	1938		Italy, Germany
Caproni Ca.164	Italy	1938	281	Italy, France
Caudron C.272	France	1931	700	
Caudron C.280/C.400/C.410	France	1932	291	
Caudron C.440 Goéland	France	1934	1,702	France, Belgium, Germany
Caudron C.480 Frégate	France	1935	27	
Caudron C.600 Aiglon	France	1935	203	
Caudron C.635 Simoun	France	1935	680	
Cessna 165	United States	1935	183	Australia, Finland
Consolidated C-87/C-109 Liberator Express	United States	1942	287	United Kingdom
Curtiss-Wright C-46/R5C Commando	United States	1941	3,181	
de Havilland DH.50	United Kingdom	1923	38	Australia
de Havilland DH.60 Moth	United Kingdom	1929		Belgium, China, Denmark, Egypt, Iraq, Netherlands, New Zealand, South Africa
de Havilland DH.80 Puss Moth	United Kingdom	1930	284	Canada, Iraq, New Zealand
de Havilland DH.83 Fox Moth	United Kingdom	1932	155	Australia, New Zealand
de Havilland DH.84 Dragon	United Kingdom	1934	202	Denmark, Iraq, New Zealand, Lithuania
de Havilland DH.85 Leopard Moth	United Kingdom	1933	133	Australia, Belgium
de Havilland D.H.86 Express	United Kingdom	1934	62	Australia, New Zealand
de Havilland DH.89 Dragon Rapide/Dominie	United Kingdom	1934	727	Australia, Belgium, Denmark, Iraq, New Zealand, United States
de Havilland DH.90 Dragonfly	United Kingdom	1936	67	Australia, Denmark, Iraq
de Havilland DH.91 Albatross	United Kingdom	1938	7	
de Havilland DH.94 Moth Minor	United Kingdom	1937	140	Australia, New Zealand
de Havilland DH.95 Flamingo	United Kingdom	1939	14	
Desoutter Mk.II	United Kingdom	1941	47	Finland
Douglas C-47/R4D Skytrain/Dakota	United States	1941	10,174	Brazil, Canada, France, India, Netherlands, New Zealand, United Kingdom
Douglas C-54/R5D Skymaster	United States	1942	1,170	United Kingdom
Douglas DC-2/C-32	United States	1934	198	Australia, Finland, Japan, Netherlands, Soviet Union, United Kingdom
Douglas DC-3	United States	1935	607	Canada, Japan, Soviet Union
Douglas DC-5/C-110/R3D	United States	1940	12	Australia, Japan
Fairchild 24 Argus/UC-61 Forwarder	United States	1932	2,232	Australia, Brazil, Canada, Thailand, United Kingdom
Fairchild 71	United States	1926		Canada
Fairchild 82	Canada	1935	24	Argentina
Fairchild C-82 Packet	United States	1944	223	
Fairchild FC-2/51	United States	1926	180	Canada
Fairchild Super 71	Canada	1934	4	
Farman F.190	France	1928	158	
Farman F.402	France	1934		
Farman F.224	France	1932	80	
Fiat G.12	Italy	1941	104	Germany, Hungary
Fiat G.18	Italy	1936	9	
Fieseler Fi 156 Storch	Germany	1936	2,900	Bulgaria, Finland, Hungary, Italy, Slovakia, Yugoslavia
Fleet Freighter	Canada	1938	5	
Fokker F.VII	Netherlands	1925		Finland, Poland
Fokker Super Universal/Nakajima Ki-6/C2N	United States	1931		Japan, Manchukuo
Ford Trimotor	United States	1926	199	Australia
Foster Wikner Wicko	United Kingdom	1936	10	New Zealand
Gotha Go 244	Germany	1942	174	
Handley Page Halifax/Halton (Note: Later versions built as transports)	United Kingdom	1940	6,176	
Handley Page Harrow bomber/transport (Note: RCAF bought 2 ex-inflight refuelling aircraft)	United Kingdom	1937	100	Canada
Hanriot H.182	France	1934	392	
Harlow C-80/PJC-2	United States	1937	11	United Kingdom
Heinkel He 116 mailplane	Germany	1938	14	
Howard UC-70/GH Nightingale	United States	1939	520	
IMAM Ro.63	Italy	1940	6	
Interstate Cadet/L-6 Grasshopper	United States	1942	574	Norway
Junkers F 13 (Note: Retired by Germany before war)	Germany	1920	322	Finland
Junkers G 24	Germany	1925	115	Greece
Junkers G 31	Germany	1926	13	Australia
Junkers Ju 52	Germany	1932	4,845	Greece, Bulgaria, Norway
Junkers Ju 90	Germany	1938	18	
Junkers Ju 252	Germany	1942	15	
Junkers Ju 290	Germany	1942	65	
Junkers Ju 352	Germany	1944	50	
Junkers W 34 & K 43	Germany	1926		Australia, Finland, Norway
Kawanishi H6K2-L/H6K-3/H6K4-L	Japan	1936	215	
Kawanishi H8K2-L Seikū	Japan	1941	167	
Kawasaki Ki-56	Japan	1940	121	
Kokusai Ki-59	Japan	1941	59	
Kokusai Ki-76	Japan	1942	937	
Laville PS-89	United States	1935	7	
Lisunov Li-2	Soviet Union	1939	6,152	
Lockheed UC-101 Vega	United States	1928	132	Australia
Lockheed 9/UC-85 Orion	United States	1931	35	
Lockheed 10/C-36 Electra	United States	1935	149	Canada, United Kingdom
Lockheed 12/UC-40 Electra Junior	United States	1936	130	Canada, Netherlands, United Kingdom
Lockheed 14 Super Electra	United States	1937	354	Canada, Japan, South Africa, United Kingdom
Lockheed 18/C-60 Lodestar	United States	1937	625	Australia, Brazil, Canada, New Zealand, South Africa, United Kingdom
Lockheed C-69 Constellation	United States	1943	22	
Lublin R-XVI	Poland	1932	7	
Messerschmitt Bf 108 Taifun	Germany	1934	885	Bulgaria, Croatia, Hungary, Italy, Japan, Romania, United Kingdom, Yugoslavia
Messerschmitt Me 323 Gigant	Germany	1943	198	
Miles Falcon	United Kingdom	1934	36	Australia
Miles Mentor	United Kingdom	1938	45	
Miles Merlin	United Kingdom	1935	4	Australia
Miles Messenger	United States	1942	93	
Miles Monarch	United States	1938	11	
Miles Whitney Straight	United Kingdom	1936	50	New Zealand
Mitsubishi G6M1-L2	Japan	1941	30	
Mitsubishi K3M	Japan	1931	625	
Mitsubishi Ki-20	Germany, Japan	1932	6	
Mitsubishi Ki-57/L4M	Japan	1942	406	
Mitsubishi L3Y	Japan	1935		
Moskalyev SAM-5	Soviet Union	1935	40	
Nakajima Ki-4 (Note: Obsolete aircraft used for training)	Japan	1934	516	Manchukuo
Nakajima Ki-34/L1N1	Japan	1936	351	
Noorduyn Norseman	Canada	1935	904	Australia, Brazil, United States
Northrop Delta	United States	1933	32	Canada, Australia
Percival Gull	United Kingdom	1932	48	New Zealand
Percival Petrel	United Kingdom	1937	27	
Percival Proctor	United Kingdom	1939	1,143	
Percival Vega Gull	United Kingdom	1935	90	Australia, Belgium, New Zealand
Piper J-3, L-4, O-59 and NE-1	United States	1938	20,219	Brazil
Piper J-4	United States	1938	1,251	United Kingdom
Polikarpov U-2	Soviet Union	1927	20,000	
Porterfield 35	United States	1935	240	New Zealand
Potez 29	France	1927	146	
Potez 56	France	1934	72	
Potez 58	France	1934	202	
Potez 62	France	1935		
Potez 650	France	1937	15	
Putilov Stal-3	Soviet Union	1933	79	
PWS-24bis	Poland	1933	11	Romania
Rearwin Sportster	United States	1935	273	New Zealand, Thailand
RWD 10	Poland	1935	23	
RWD 13	Poland	1935	100	Romania
RWD 15	Poland	1937	6	Romania
SAI KZ II	Denmark	1937	45	
SAIMAN 202	Italy	1939	390	Croatia
Savoia-Marchetti S.73	Italy	1934	53	Belgium, United Kingdom
Savoia-Marchetti S.74	Italy	1934	3	
Savoia-Marchetti SM.75	Italy	1938	90	Hungary, Germany
Savoia-Marchetti SM.82	Italy	1940	727	Germany
Savoia-Marchetti S.83	Italy	1938	23	Belgium, Romania
SFCA Taupin	France	1936	53	
Shcherbakov Shche-2	Soviet Union	1943	550	
Short Stirling (Note: Paratroop transport and glider tug)	United Kingdom	1943		
Showa/Nakajima L2D	Japan	1939	487	
Siebel Si 204	Germany	1942	1,216	
Spartan UC-71 Executive	United States	1936	36	Canada, China, United Kingdom
Stinson L-1/O-49 Vigilant	United States	1941	324	United Kingdom
Stinson L-5 Sentinel	United States	1942	3,590	United Kingdom, United States
Stinson Reliant	United States	1933	1,327	Australia, Norway, Philippines, United Kingdom
Stinson Voyager	United States	1939	1,052	Canada, France
Tachikawa Ki-54	Japan	1940	1,368	
Taylorcraft Auster	United Kingdom	1942	1,630	Australia
Taylorcraft D	United States	1941	3,170	
Taylorcraft L-2	United States	1941	1,984	
Tugan Gannet	Australia	1935	8	
Tupolev ANT-9	Soviet Union	1931	100	
Tupolev PS-35	Soviet Union	1937	11	
Vickers Type 264 Valentia bomber/transport	United Kingdom	1934		
Vickers Warwick	United Kingdom	1939	114	South Africa
Waco UC-72 (and other Waco variants)	United States	1930s	42	Australia, Brazil, New Zealand, Norway, United Kingdom
Yakovlev Yak-6	Soviet Union	1942	381	
Yokosuka L3Y	Japan	1935		

=== Transport gliders ===
Type	Origin	Introduced	Total	Operators
Airspeed Horsa	United Kingdom	1942	3,655	United States
Antonov A-7	Soviet Union	1942	400	
de Havilland Australia DHA-G	Australia	1942	8	
DFS 230	Germany	1938	1,600	
General Aircraft Hamilcar	United Kingdom	1942	344	
Gotha Go 242	Germany	1941	1,528	
Gribovski G-11	Soviet Union	1941	500	
Kokusai Ku-8	Japan	1941	700	
Kolesnikov-Tsibin KC-20	Soviet Union	1942	68	
Maeda Ku-1	Japan	1941	100	
Messerschmitt Me 321 Gigant	Germany	1941	200	
Slingsby Hengist	United Kingdom	1942	18	
Waco CG-13	United States	1945	135	
Waco CG-15	United States	1943	473	
Waco CG-3	United States	1942	100	
Waco CG-4/Hadrian	United States	1942	13,903	United Kingdom

== Trainers ==
Primary trainers are used for basic flight training while advanced trainers were used for familiarization with the more complex systems and higher speeds of combat aircraft, and for air combat training. Multi-engined trainers were used to prepare pilots for multi-engine bombers and transports, and to train navigators, bombardiers, gunners and flight engineers. Most nations used obsolete combat types for advanced training, although large scale training programs such as the British Commonwealth Air Training Plan (BCATP) required more aircraft than were available and aircraft were designed and built specifically to fulfill training roles. Intermediate trainers were used in several countries but additional hours at the primary stage made them redundant.

=== Glider trainers ===
Type	Origin	Introduced	Total	Operators
DFS SG 38 Schulgleiter primary training glider	Germany	1938	10,000	Japan
General Aircraft Hotspur assault glider trainer	United Kingdom	1940	1,015	
Laister-Kauffman TG-4	United States	1941	153	
Slingsby Kirby Cadet	United Kingdom	1935	376	
Schweizer TG-3	United States	1942	114	
Schweizer TG-2/LNS-1	United States	1938	57	
Schneider Grunau Baby	Germany	1931	6,000	Denmark

=== Primary trainers ===
Type	Origin	Introduced	Total	Operators
ANBO V / 51	Lithuania	1931, 1936	15	Soviet Union (several ANBO 51s)
Avro 504	United Kingdom	1913	11,303	Greece, Thailand
Avro 626	United Kingdom	1930	198	Belgium, Canada, Greece, Lithuania, New Zealand
Avro 643 Cadet	United Kingdom	1932	104	Australia, China
Avro Tutor	United Kingdom	1933	606	Canada, Denmark, Greece
Beneš-Mráz Be-50 Beta-Minor	Czechoslovakia	1935		Germany, Slovakia
Blackburn B-2	United Kingdom	1932	42	
Boeing-Stearman Model 73/75/PT-13/PT-17/PT-18/NS/N2S Kaydet	United States	1934	8,584	Brazil, Canada, China, Philippines
Breda Ba.25 & Ba.28	Italy	1932	766	Hungary, China, Norway
Bücker Bü 131, Ki-86, K9W1	Germany	1935	5,000	Bulgaria, Hungary, Japan, Romania, Yugoslavia
Bücker Bü 181	Germany	1940	3,400	Bulgaria
CAC Wackett	Australia	1941	202	
Caproni Ca.113	Italy	1931	107	Bulgaria, Peru, Portugal
Caproni Ca.164	Italy	1938	281	France
Consolidated PT-1 Trusty	United States	1921	221	Philippines, Thailand
DAR 9 Siniger	Bulgaria	1940	42	Yugoslavia
de Havilland DH.60 Moth	United Kingdom	1925	1,535	Australia, Denmark, Finland, Iraq, New Zealand, Norway
de Havilland Tiger Moth (Note: Built in Canada & elsewhere)	United Kingdom	1932	8,868	Australia, Brazil, Canada, Denmark, India, Iraq, New Zealand, Norway
Fairchild PT-19/23/26 Cornell	United States	1940	7,700	Brazil, Canada, Norway
Fleet Fawn	Canada	1931	71	Brazil
Fleet 10/16/Finch	Canada	1939	606	China, Brazil, Romania
Focke-Wulf Fw 44	Germany	1932	1,900	Brazil, Bulgaria, China, Czechoslovakia, Finland, Hungary, Poland, Romania, Slovakia
Fokker S.IV	Netherlands	1924	31	
Fokker S.IX	Netherlands	1937	50	
Gotha Go 145	Germany	1935	1,182	
Hanriot H.43	France	1928	160	
Hanriot H.16	France	1930	54	
Heinkel He 72	Germany	1933		Bulgaria
Kawasaki Army Type 92 Fighter	Japan	1930	385	
Klemm Kl 25	Germany	1928	720	Norway
Koolhoven F.K.51	Netherlands	1935	142	
Letov Š-218	Czechoslovakia	1930		Finland
Meyers OTW CPTP trainer	United States	1936	102	
Miles Hawk	United Kingdom	1933	55	New Zealand
Miles Magister	United Kingdom	1937	1,303	Norway
Morane-Saulnier MS.230	France	1930	1,000	Germany, Greece
Morane-Saulnier MS.315	France	1932	356	
Mráz Zobor I	Slovakia	1942	18	
Naval Aircraft Factory N3N Canary	United States	1936	997	
North American NA-16	United States	1935	1,935	China, Brazil
North American BT-9/BT-14/NJ	United States	1936	260	
Piper J-4	United States	1938	1,251	
Ryan PT-16/20/21/22 Recruit	United States	1934	1,568	Australia, Netherlands
RWD 8	Poland	1934	550	Latvia, Romania, Hungary, Yugoslavia
RWD 17	Poland	1938	30	Romania
Polikarpov Po-2	Soviet Union	1929	20,000	
Praga E-39	Czechoslovakia	1931	139	
PWS-16	Poland	1933	40	Spain
Repülőgépgyár Levente II	Hungary	1943	88	
SAIMAN 200	Italy	1940	140	Croatia, Germany
Spartan NP-1	United States	1940	201	
Tachikawa Ki-9	Japan	1935	2,618	
Tachikawa Ki-17	Japan	1936	560	
Timm N2T Tutor	United States	1943	262	
VL Sääski	Finland	1928	38	
VL Viima	Finland	1935	24	
Vultee BT-13/15/SNV Valiant	United States	1939	9,525	Brazil
Waco UPF-7/PT-14 CPTP trainer	United States	1930		
Weiss WM-10 Ölyv	Hungary	1933	14	
Yokosuka K5Y	Japan	1934	5,770	
Yakovlev UT-2	Soviet Union	1937	7,243	
Zlín Z-XII	Czechoslovakia	1935	252	Germany, Slovakia, UK, Yugoslavia

=== Advanced trainers ===
Type	Origin	Introduced	Total	Operators
Ambrosini S.7	Italy	1943	12	
Ambrosini SAI.10 Grifone	Italy	1940	10	
Arado Ar 65	Germany	1931	85	
Arado Ar 66	Germany	1933	1,456	
Arado Ar 68	Germany	1936	511	
Arado Ar 96	Germany	1939	2,891	Bulgaria, Hungary, Romania
Avia B.122	Czechoslovakia	1934		Bulgaria, Germany, Romania, Slovakia, Soviet Union
Bücker Bü 133	Germany	1938	250	Hungary, Lithuania, Yugoslavia
CAC Wirraway	Australia	1939	755	
Kaproni Bulgarski KB-2/3/4/5	Bulgaria	1931		
Caudron C.690	France	1939	19	
Curtiss-Wright CW-22/SNC Falcon	United States	1942	442	Netherlands
Focke-Wulf Fw 56	Germany	1935	1,000	
Fokker D.XVII	Netherlands	1932	12	
Hawker Hart Trainer	United Kingdom	1930		
I.Ae. 22 DL	Argentina	1944	206	
IMAM Ro.41	Italy	1935	744	
Koolhoven F.K.56	Netherlands	1938	31	Belgium
Messerschmitt Bf 108	Germany	1935	885	Brazil, Bulgaria, China Croatia, Czechoslovakia, France, Hungary, Italy, Japan, Manchukuo, Norway, Poland, Romania, Spain, Switzerland, Soviet Union, United Kingdom, United States, Yugoslavia
Miles Master	United Kingdom	1939	3,249	
Mitsubishi A5M4-K (Note: Variant specifically built as a trainer)	Japan	1936	1,094	
Mitsubishi A6M2-K Zero	Japan	1940	517	
Morane-Saulnier M.S.225	France	1933	75	
Muniz M-9	Brazil	1937	56	
Mansyu Ki-79	Japan	1937	1,329	
Nardi FN.305	Italy	1938	211	Romania, Hungary, France
Nardi FN.316	Italy	1942	49	Germany
Nieuport-Delage NiD 62	France	1931		
North American NA-16	United States	1935	1,935	France, Germany
North American NA-64 Yale	United States	1940	230	Canada, France, Germany
North American P-64 (Note: Ordered by Thailand, disarmed and impressed as trainer)	United States	1940	13	
North American T-6/SNJ Texan/Harvard	United States	1935	15,495	Brazil, Canada, India, New Zealand, Norway, United Kingdom
Orlogsværftet O-Maskinen	Denmark	1926		
Praga BH-41	Czechoslovakia	1931		
PTO-4	Estonia	1938	8	Germany
PWS-26	Poland	1937	310	Romania, Germany
Rogožarski PVT	Yugoslavia	1934	61	
Rogožarski R-100	Yugoslavia	1939	25	
Rogožarski SIM-X	Yugoslavia	1937	21	
Romano R.82	France	1937	180	
SET 7	Romania	1931	123	
Stampe et Vertongen SV.5 Tornado	Belgium	1933	32	Latvia
Tachikawa Ki-55	Japan	1940	1,389	Japan, Thailand
Svenska Aero Jaktfalken	Sweden	1930	19	Finland
THK-2	Turkey	1944	6	
VEF I-12	Latvia	1935	12	
VL Tuisku	Finland	1935	31	
VL Pyry	Finland	1941	41	
Yakovlev UT-1	Soviet Union	1936	1,241	China
Zmaj Fizir FN	Yugoslavia	1931	210	Croatia, Italy
Zmaj Fizir FP-2	Yugoslavia	1936	81	Croatia, Italy

=== Bomber trainers, target tugs and misc. trainers ===
Type	Origin	Role	Introduced	Total	Operators
Airspeed Oxford	United Kingdom		1937	8,851	Australia, Canada, New Zealand, Norway
Avro 504N	United Kingdom	target tug	1913; 7 Impressed 1940		
Avro Anson T20/T21/T22	United Kingdom, Canada		1936	366	Greece, France, United States
Blackburn Botha	United Kingdom	bomber trainer & target tug	1939		
Bristol Buckmaster	United Kingdom		1945	112	
Beechcraft AT-10 Wichita	United States		1942	2,371	
Cessna AT-8/AT-17/UC-78/JRC Bobcat/Crane	United States		1939	5,422	Brazil, Canada, France
Consolidated AT-22/TB-24 Liberator	United States		1943	287	
CANT Z.1015	Italy	torpedo bomber trainer	1939	660	
Curtiss AT-9	United States		1941	792	
De Havilland Dominie	United Kingdom	radio trainer	1940	727	
Fairchild AT-21 Gunner	United States		1943	175	
Fairey IIIF	United Kingdom	target tug	1926	968	
Fairey Battle	United Kingdom		1939	2,201	Australia, Canada, South Africa, Greece
Fairey Gordon	United Kingdom		1931	186	Australia
Fleet Fort	Canada	intermediate trainer/radio trainer	1941	101	
Focke-Wulf Fw 58	Germany		1937	1,350	Brazil, Bulgaria, Croatia, Finland, Hungary, Netherlands, Romania
Hanriot H.232	France		1940	35	Finland
Hawker Demon	United Kingdom	target tug	1930	35	Australia
Hawker Henley	United Kingdom	target tug	1938	202	
Kyushu K10W	Japan	intermediate trainer/target tug	1943	176	
Kyushu K11W	Japan	bomber crew trainer	1943	798	
Lockheed AT-18 Hudson	United States		1938	217	
LWS-6/PZL.30 Żubr	Poland		1938	17	
Martin AT-23/TB-26	United States		1940	300	
Miles Martinet	United Kingdom	target tug	1942	1,724	
Miles Mentor	United Kingdom	radio trainer	1938	45	
Mitsubishi K7M	Japan		1931	2	
Nardi FN.315	Italy	intermediate trainer	1938	33	
North American AT-24/TB-25 Mitchell	United States		1941	354	
Percival Proctor	United Kingdom	radio trainer	1939	1,143	
Potez 56	France	crew trainer/target tug	1936	72	
Stinson Reliant	United States		1933	1,327	United Kingdom
Tachikawa Ki-54	Japan		1941	1,368	
Westland Wallace	United Kingdom		1933	172	
Yokosuka K4Y	Japan	floatplane trainer	1933	211	

== Rotorcraft ==
Type	Origin	Role	Introduced	Total	Operators
Cierva C.30	United Kingdom	autogyro	1934	148	Belgium, France, Germany
Flettner Fl 282	Germany	helicopter	1942	24	
Focke-Achgelis Fa 330	Germany	autogyro kite	1943	200	
Focke-Achgelis Fa 223 Drache	Germany	Helicopter	1942	24	Germany
Kamov A-7	Soviet Union	autogyro	1934	7	
Kayaba Ka-1 and Ka-2	Japan	autogyro	1941	98	
Pitcairn PA-39 (Note: Not used by US)	United States	autogyro	1940		United Kingdom
Sikorsky R-4	United States	helicopter	1944	131	United Kingdom
Sikorsky R-6	United States	helicopter	1945	225	United Kingdom

== Lighter than air ==
Type	Origin	Role	Introduced	Total	Operators
Goodyear G class blimp	United States	patrol blimp	1935	10	
Goodyear K class blimp	United States	patrol blimp	1938	132	
Goodyear L class blimp	United States	training blimp	1938	22	
Goodyear M class blimp	United States	patrol blimp	1944	4	

== Rockets and drones ==
Type	Origin	Role	Introduced	Total	Operators
Aeronautica Lombarda A.R.	Italy	radio controlled flying bomb	1943		
Airspeed AS.30 Queen Wasp	United Kingdom	target drone	1937	7	
Culver PQ-8	United States	target drone	1940	600	
Culver PQ-14 Cadet	United States	target drone	1942	2,043	
de Havilland DH.82 Queen Bee	United Kingdom	target drone	1935	412	
Fieseler Fi 103R	Germany	manned missile	1944	175	
Henschel Hs 293	Germany	guided missile	1943	100	
Interstate TDR	United States	assault drone	1944	195	
Kawasaki Ki-148	Japan	guided missile	1944	180	
McDonnell TD2D Katydid	United States	target drone	1942		
Mitsubishi Ki-147	Japan	guided missile	1944	10	
Naval Aircraft Factory TDN	United States	assault drone	1942	104	
Naval Aircraft Modification Unit KDN Gorgon	United States	target drone	1945	19	
Radioplane OQ-2	United States	target drone	1939	15,000	
V-1 Flying Bomb	Germany	surface to surface cruise missile	1943	5,090	
V-2 rocket	Germany	surface to surface ballistic missile	1944	3,000	
Yokosuka MXY7 Ohka	Japan	manned missile	1945	852	

== Prototypes ==
Prototypes were aircraft that were intended to enter service but did not, either due to changing requirements, failing to meet requirements or other problems. They may not have reached production before the end of the war but may have entered service post-war. If the aircraft was deployed to regular squadrons or used in an operational capacity other than evaluation, it should be listed above under its appropriate type. Napkinwaffe - paper projects and aircraft that first flew after the war are not included.

=== Fighter prototypes ===
Type	Origin	Introduced	Total	Notes
Aeronautica Umbra Trojani AUT.18	Italy	1939	1	
Aichi S1A Denkō	Japan	1945	2	night fighter
Ambrosini SS.4	Italy	1940	1	canard pusher-engine fighter
Ambrosini SAI.107	Italy	1940	14	lightweight fighter
Ambrosini SAI.403	Italy	1943	1	lightweight fighter
Arado Ar 240	Germany	1940	14	
Arsenal-Delanne 10	France	1941	1	tandem-wing two-seat fighter
Avia B.35	Czechoslovakia	1938	3	
Aviotehas PN-3	Estonia	1939	1	
Bachem Ba 349 Natter	Germany	1945	36	vertical launch point defence rocket interceptor
Bell XP-77	United States	1944	2	lightweight fighter
Bell XP-83	United States	1945	2	jet fighter
Bell YFM-1 Airacuda flying cruiser	United States	1940	13	
Bereznyak-Isayev BI-1	Soviet Union	1942	9	rocket fighter
Blohm & Voss BV 155	Germany	1944	3	high-altitude fighter
Boeing XF8B	United States	1944	3	
Boeing YB-40 Flying Fortress	United States	1943	25	bomber escort gunship
Borovkov-Florov I-207	Soviet Union	1937	5	cantilever-wing biplane fighter
Boulton Paul P.92	United Kingdom	1937	1	turret fighter
Canadian Car and Foundry FDB-1	Canada	1938	1	biplane fighter
Caproni Ca.335/SABCA S.47	Italy	1939	1	for Belgium
Caproni Vizzola F.4	Italy	1940	1	
Caproni Vizzola F.5	Italy	1939	14	
Caproni Vizzola F.6	Italy	1941	2	
Chu XP-0	China	1943	1	
Consolidated XB-41 Liberator	United States	1942	1	bomber escort gunship
Consolidated Vultee XP-81	United States	1945	2	
Curtiss XF14C	United States	1944	1	naval fighter with liquid-cooled engine
Curtiss XF15C	United States	1945	3	inspired by the FR-1 Fireball
Curtiss YP-37	United States	1937	14	
Curtiss XP-42	United States	1939	1	
Curtiss XP-46	United States	1941	2	
Curtiss XP-53/YP-60	United States	1942	6	
Curtiss XP-62	United States	1943	1	
Curtiss-Wright XP-55 Ascender	United States	1943	3	canard pusher-engine fighter
De Havilland Hornet	United Kingdom	1944	383	twin engined fighter, entered service post-war
de Havilland Vampire	United Kingdom	1943	3,268	jet fighter entered service post-war
Fokker D.XXIII	Netherlands	1939	1	push/pull twin-engine fighter
Fiat G.56	Italy	1944	2	
Fisher P-75 Eagle	United States	1943	14	
Gloster F.5/34	United Kingdom	1937	2	No longer flying by 1941
Gloster F.9/37	United Kingdom	1939	1	heavy fighter
Grumman XF5F Skyrocket	United States	1940	1	
Grumman XP-50	United States	1941	1	
Hawker Fury/Sea Fury	United Kingdom	1944	864	entered service post-war
Hawker Hotspur	United Kingdom	1938	1	redesign of Hawker Henley as turret fighter
Hawker Tornado	United Kingdom	1939	4	Rolls-Royce Vulture powered equivalent of Hawker Typhoon
Heinkel He 280	Germany	1940	9	
Henschel Hs 132	Germany	1945	4	prone pilot jet fighter/dive bomber
Horten Ho 229	Germany	1944	3	jet flying wing fighter
Hughes D-2	United States	1943	1	
IMAM Ro.58	Italy	1942	1	
Kawasaki Ki-60	Japan	1941	3	
Kawasaki Ki-64	Japan	1943	1	
Kawasaki Ki-96	Japan	1943	3	
Koolhoven F.K.55	Netherlands	1938	1	buried-engine fighter
Kyūshū J7W Shinden	Japan	1945	2	canard pusher-engine fighter
Lockheed XP-49	United States	1942	1	
Lockheed XP-58 Chain Lightning	United States	1944	1	
Macchi C.201	Italy	1940	2	
Martin-Baker MB 2	United Kingdom	1938	1	
Martin-Baker MB 3	United Kingdom	1942	1	
Martin-Baker MB 5	United Kingdom	1944	1	
McDonnell FD Phantom	United States	1945	62	naval jet fighter
McDonnell XP-67 Bat	United States	1944	1	
Messerschmitt Me 209	Germany	1938	4	racer/fighter
Messerschmitt Me 309	Germany	1942	4	
Messerschmitt Me 328	Germany	1944	9	pulse jet fighter
Mikoyan-Gurevich I-250	Soviet Union	1945	12	mixed-power fighter
Miles M.20	United Kingdom	1940	2	emergency fighter
Mitsubishi A7M Reppū	Japan	1944	9	upgraded A6M
Mitsubishi J8M/Ki-200 Shūsui	Japan	1944	7	rocket-propelled interceptor
Moskalyev SAM-13	Soviet Union	1940	1	
Nakajima Ki-12	Japan	1936		V12 fighter
Nakajima Kikka	Japan	1945	1	jet fighter
Nikitin IS-1	Soviet Union	1941	2	
North American P-82 Twin Mustang	United States	1945	272	
Northrop XP-56 Black Bullet	United States	1943	2	tailless pusher fighter
Orlogsævsfet J.1 Jager	Denmark	1940	0	in design stage
Piaggio P.119	Italy	1942	1	buried radial-engine fighter
Polikarpov I-185	Soviet Union	1941	5	
Polikarpov ITP	Soviet Union	1942	2	
Polikarpov TIS	Soviet Union	1941	2	
Prajadhipok	Siam	1929	1	Thailand (formerly Siam)
PZL.38 Wilk	Poland	1938	2	
PZL.50 Jastrząb	Poland	1939	1	
Reggiane Re.2006	Italy	n/a	1	completed but not flown
Renard R-36/R-37/R-38	Belgium	1938	1	
Republic XP-69/XP-72	United States	1943	2	
Savoia-Marchetti SM.88	Italy	1939	1	heavy fighter
Savoia-Marchetti SM.91	Italy	1943	2	heavy fighter
Savoia-Marchetti SM.92	Italy	1943	1	heavy fighter
SNCAO 200	France	1939	1	
SNCASE SE.100	France	1939	1	
Sukhoi Su-5	Soviet Union	1945	1	mixed-power fighter
Sukhoi Su-7	Soviet Union	1944	1	high-altitude interceptor
Tachikawa Ki-106	Japan	1945	3	
Varga RMI-1 X/H	Hungary	n/a	1	world's first turboprop aircraft, twin-engine fighter bomber, completed but not flown, destroyed by bombing raids before first flight
VEF I-16	Latvia	1939	1	lightweight fighter
Vickers Type 432	United Kingdom	1942	1	high-altitude heavy fighter
VL Humu	Finland	1944	1	
VL Pyörremyrsky	Finland	1945	1	
Vultee XP-54	United States	1943	2	high-altitude interceptor
Weiss Manfréd WM-23 Ezüst Nyíl	Hungary	1941	1	

=== Bomber and attack aircraft prototypes ===
Type	Origin	Introduced	Total	Notes
Aero A.300	Czechoslovakia	1938		
ANBO VIII	Lithuania	1939	1	
Avia B-158	Czechoslovakia	1938	1	
Avro Lincoln	United Kingdom	1944	604	Type entered service in 1945 after end of war
Beechcraft XA-38 Grizzly	United States	1944	2	
Blackburn Firebrand	United Kingdom	1942	223	Type entered service in 1945 after end of war
Bloch MB.162	France	1940	1	
Boeing XB-15	United States	1937	1	Single large long range bomber prototype, converted to transport (as XC-105) during war
Boeing XB-38 Flying Fortress	United States	1943	1	alternative engine for B-17 Flying Fortress
Boeing XB-39 Superfortress	United States	1944	1	alternative engine for B-29 project
Boeing XB-44 Superfortress	United States	1945	1	development of B-50 Superfortress
Breguet 462	France	1936	5	Modernised version of Breguet 460 Vultur. Two served in Vichy France
Breda Ba.75	Italy	1939	1	
Breda Ba.201	Italy	1941	2	
Brewster XA-32	United States	1943	2	
Bristol Brigand	United Kingdom	1944	147	entered service 1946
CAC Woomera	Australia	1941	2	
CANSA FC.12	Italy	1940	11	
CANSA FC.20	Italy	1941	6	
CANT Z.1011	Italy	1936	6	
CANT Z.1018	Italy	1939	15	
Caproni Ca.355	Italy	1941	1	
Caudron C.670 Typhon	France	1935	10	one light bomber prototype (derived from C.640 high speed postal carrier)
DAR 10	Bulgaria	1939	2	
Dornier Do 19	Germany	1936	3	cancelled heavy bomber, possibly used as transport
Dornier Do 317	Germany	1943	6	heavy bomber
Douglas AD Skyraider	United States	1945	3,180	torpedo/dive bomber
Douglas BTD Destroyer	United States	1944	30	
Douglas XB-19	United States	1941	1	single aircraft to same specification as Boeing XB-15
Douglas XA-42 Mixmaster	United States	1944	2	buried engines driving pusher propeller in tail
Douglas XTB2D Skypirate	United States	1945	2	intended successor of the Douglas Devastator
Fairey Spearfish	United Kingdom	1945	5	
Fiat AS.14	Italy	1943	186	
Focke-Wulf Fw 191	Germany	1942	3	heavy bomber
Fokker T.IX	Netherlands	1939	1	
Heinkel He 119	Germany	1937	8	unarmed reconnaissance bomber
Heinkel He 274	Germany	1945	2	high-altitude bomber
Henschel Hs 130	Germany	1940		high-altitude bomber
IAR 47	Romania	1942	2	
Junkers Ju 287	Germany	1944	2	
Junkers Ju 288	Germany	1940	22	bomber
Kaiser-Fleetwings XBTK	United States	1945	5	dive and torpedo bomber
Latécoère 299	France	1939	121	carrier-based Latécoère 298
Letov Š-50	Czechoslovakia	1938	1	
Lockheed XP2V-1 Neptune	United States	1945	1,177	anti-submarine aircraft
Messerschmitt Me 261	Germany	1940	3	maritime reconnaissance
Messerschmitt Me 264	Germany	1942	3	4-engine Amerika bomber
Nakajima G5N Shinzan	Japan	1941	6	
Nakajima G8N Renzan	Japan	1944	4	
North American XB-28 Dragon	United States	1942	2	high-altitude medium bomber
Piaggio P.50	Italy	1937	3	
Polikarpov NB	Soviet Union	1944	1	
PZL.42	Poland	1936		
PZL.46 Sum	Poland	1939	2	
Reggiane Re.2003	Italy	1941	1	
Rikugun Ki-93	Japan	1945	1	
Savoia-Marchetti SM.86	Italy	1940	34	
Savoia-Marchetti SM.89	Italy	1942	1	
Savoia-Marchetti SM.93	Italy	1944	1	
SNCAO CAO.600	France	1940	1	
Stearman XA-21	United States	1938	1	twin engine attack aircraft (light bomber)
Sukhoi Su-6	Soviet Union	1941	3	
Supermarine Type 322	United Kingdom	1943	2	Naval torpedo/dive bomber, reconnaissance aircraft
Tachikawa Ki-74	Japan	1944	16	
Vickers Windsor	United Kingdom	1943	3	High-altitude heavy bomber with a pressurised crew compartment
Vultee XA-41	United States	1944	1	
Zmaj R-1	Yugoslavia	1940	1	

=== Transport prototypes ===
Type	Origin	Introduced	Total	Notes
Blohm & Voss BV 144	Germany	1944	2	built in France
Boeing 367 YC-97 Stratofreighter	United States	1944	77	based on B-29, entered service in 1947
Burnelli UB-14/Cunliffe-Owen Clyde Clipper	United States	1939	3	prototype used by UK and France
Consolidated R2Y	United States	1944	1	PB4Y-2 with new fuselage
Curtiss-Wright C-76 Caravan	United States	1943	25	wood transport with nose doors
Junkers Ju 390	Germany	1943	2	heavy transport and maritime patrol
Kokusai Ki-105	Japan	1945	2	fuel transport
Lockheed L-049 Constellation	United States	1944	88	civil version of the C-69
LWS-2	Poland	1937	1	medical transport
Martin 156	Soviet Union	1940	1	Russian-built seaplane airliner
Praga E-210	Czechoslovakia	1937	1	
Savoia-Marchetti SM.95	Italy	1943	20	
SNCASE Languedoc	France	1939	100	
Stout XC-107	United States	1941	4	flying car evaluated by USAAF
Tachikawa Ki-77	Japan	1942	2	very long-range transport
Tachikawa Ki-92	Japan	1945	1	troop/cargo transport

=== Glider prototypes ===
Type	Origin	Introduced	Total	Notes
Aeronautica Lombarda AL-12P	Italy	1943	16	
Allied Aviation XLRA	United States	1943	2	seaplane glider
Antonov A-40	Soviet Union	1942	1	
AVIA LM.02	Italy	1942		bomber glider
Baynes Bat	United Kingdom	1943	7	experimental tailless glider
Blohm & Voss BV 40	Germany	1944	2	interceptor glider
Bristol XLRQ	United States	1943	3	seaplane glider
CAT TM-2	Italy	1943	2	
Chase YCG-14	United States	1945	2	
Cornelius XFG-1	United States	1944	1	
DFS 331	Germany	1942		
Frankfort TG-1	United States	1940	43	
General Airborne Transport XCG-16	United States	1943	16	
Gotha Ka 430	Germany	1943	12	
Horten H.IV	Germany	1941	4	flying wing glider
Horten H.V	Germany	1937	2	
I.Ae. 25 Mañque	Argentina	1945	1	
Junkers Ju 322	Germany	1941	2	
Kokusai Ku-7	Japan	1942	2	
Laister-Kauffman XCG-10	United States	1942	5	
Maeda Ku-6	Japan	1945	1	
Pratt-Read TG-32	United States	1940	75	
Polikarpov BDP	Soviet Union	1943	2	
Slingsby T.20	United Kingdom	1944	1	
St. Louis CG-5	United States	1942	1	
Yokosuka MXY5	Japan	1942	12	

=== Trainer prototypes ===
Type	Origin	Introduced	Total	Notes
Airspeed Cambridge	United Kingdom	1941	2	advanced trainer
Boeing XAT-15	United States	1942	2	
CAT QR.14	Italy	1943		
de Havilland Don	United Kingdom	1938	30	
Fleetwings BT-12	United States	1942	25	
General Aircraft Cagnet	United Kingdom	1939	1	
General Aircraft Cygnet	United Kingdom	1937	11	
General Aircraft Owlet	United Kingdom	1942	1	
Heston T.1/37	United Kingdom	1938	1	
Ikarus Aero 2	Yugoslavia	1940	248	
Ikarus MM-2	Yugoslavia	1941	1	
Marinens Flyvebaatfabrikk/Høver M.F.12	Norway	1939	4	floatplane trainer
Miles M.15	United Kingdom	1938	2	
Miles Kestrel	United Kingdom	1937	1	
Miles Mercury	United Kingdom	1941	6	
Miles Monitor	United Kingdom	1944	22	target tug
Parnall 382	United Kingdom	1939	1	
PWS-33 Wyżeł	Poland	1938	2	twin-engine trainer
PWS-35 Ogar	Poland	1938	2	
Reid and Sigrist R.S.1	United Kingdom	1939	1	twin-engine trainer
Reid and Sigrist R.S.3	United Kingdom	1945	1	twin-engine trainer
Rogozarski SIM-XI	Yugoslavia	1938	1	
St. Louis YPT-15	United States	1940	14	primary trainer
Stampe SV.4	Belgium	1933	1,050	biplane trainer, flown before war, not used until after
Stearman XBT-17	United States	1942	1	monoplane trainer
Yakovlev Yak-5	Soviet Union	1944	1	
Yokosuka D3Y Myōjō	Japan	1945	5	bomber trainer

=== Rotorcraft prototypes ===
Type	Origin	Introduced	Total	Notes
Breguet-Dorand Gyroplane Laboratoire	France	1935	1	Helicopter
Dorand G.20	France	n/a		Helicopter
Focke-Achgelis Fa 223	Germany	1942	20	twin rotor transport helicopter
Focke-Achgelis Fa 225	Germany	1942	1	rotary wing glider
Hafner Rotabuggy	United Kingdom	1943	1	towed autogyro jeep
Higgins EB-1	United States	1943	1	Helicopter
Kellett KD-1/XO-60/YO-60	United States	1934		autogyro
Landgraf H-2	United States	1944	1	helicopter
McDonnell XHJH Whirlaway	United States	1944	1	helicopter
Piaggio-D'Ascanio PD3	Italy	1942		helicopter
Piasecki HRP Rescuer	United States	1945	28	helicopter
Platt-LePage XR-1	United States	1941	2	helicopter
Vought-Sikorsky VS-300	United States	1939		amphibious helicopter

=== Missile prototypes ===
Type	Origin	Introduced	Total	Notes
Blohm & Voss BV 143	Germany	1941	157	anti-ship missile
Blohm & Voss BV 246	Germany	1943	1,000	Hagelkorn guided glide bomb
EMW C2 Wasserfall	Germany	1943		guided surface-to-air missile developed from V-2
Fletcher PQ-11	United States	1941	11	target drone/glide bomb
McDonnell LBD Gargoyle	United States	1945	200	air-to-surface missile
Mistel	Germany	1943	250	large air-to-surface missile with parasite guidance aircraft
Northrop JB-1 Bat	United States	1944		surface-to-surface missile
Republic-Ford JB-2	United States	1944	1,391	surface-to-surface missile (V-1 copy)
Rheinmetall-Borsig Feuerlilie	Germany	1943		surface-to-air missile
Ruhrstahl X-4	Germany	1944		air-to-air missile

=== Miscellaneous prototypes ===
Type	Origin	Introduced	Total	Notes
Airspeed Fleet Shadower	United Kingdom	1940	1	low speed shipborne aircraft for tracking enemy fleet visually
AVIS C.4	Italy	1940	1	liaison
Bestetti Nardie BN.1	Italy	1940		racer/fighter/liaison
Blackburn B-20	United Kingdom	1940	1	seaplane with retractable hull
Bloch MB.480	France	1939	2	floatplane
Blohm & Voss BV 141	Germany	1938	28	asymmetrical tactical reconnaissance aircraft
Blohm & Voss BV 238	Germany	1944	1	large transport flying boat
Boeing XPBB Sea Ranger	United States	1942	1	patrol seaplane
CANT Z.511	Italy	1940	2	transport/bomber floatplane
CANT Z.516	Italy	1940	1	bomber floatplane
Caproni Ca.316	Italy	1940	14	floatplane
Caproni Ca.331	Italy	1940	3	reconnaissance aircraft, bomber, and night fighter
Consolidated XP4Y Corregidor	United States	1939	1	patrol seaplane
DFS 228	Germany	1944	2	high-altitude manned reconnaissance rocket
ERCO Ercoupe YO-55	United States	1940	5,685	JATO tests
Fairchild XBQ-3	United States	1944	2	assault drone
Fleetwings XBQ-2	United States	1943	1	assault drone
General Aircraft Fleet Shadower	United Kingdom	1940	1	low-speed shipborne aircraft for tracking enemy vessels
Kawanishi E15K Shiun	Japan	1941	15	reconnaissance floatplane
Kobeseiko Te-Gō	Japan	1943	1	STOL spotter/liaison
Koolhoven F.K.49	Netherlands	1935	4	photo survey
Loire-Nieuport 10	France	1939	1	patrol floatplane
LWS-3 Mewa	Poland	1938	30	army cooperation
Nakajima Ki-115	Japan	1945	104	kamikaze aircraft
Nihon L7P	Japan	1942	1	transport amphibian
Nikol A-2	Poland	1939	1	seaplane trainer
Potez-CAMS 141	France	1938	1	long range reconnaissance flying boat
Praga E-51	Czechoslovakia	1938	1	tactical reconnaissance
SFAN 11	France	1940	1	liaison
Short Seaford	United Kingdom	1944	10	improved Sunderland, trials only
Short Shetland	United Kingdom	1944	2	long range reconnaissance flying boat
SNCAC NC.4-10	France	1939	1	floatplane bomber/torpedo bomber
SNCAO 30	France	1938	2	seaplane trainer
Tachikawa Ki-70	Japan	1943	3	high-speed photo reconnaissance aircraft
Tupolev MTB-2	Soviet Union	1937	2	four-engine flying boat, cancelled after German invasion
Yokosuka R2Y Keiun	Japan	1945	3	reconnaissance aircraft
Zveno SPB	Soviet Union	1938		2-5 parasite fighters carried by bomber

== Experimental aircraft ==
Aircraft intended to prove a concept or idea and which were not intended or suitable for military service. Does not include operational aircraft modified for experimental purposes.

=== Flight behaviour research ===
Type	Origin	Introduced	Total	Notes
Armstrong Whitworth A.W.52	United Kingdom	1945	2	flying wing
Bell 30	United States	1943	3	experimental helicopter
Cierva W.9	United Kingdom	1945		experimental helicopter
DFS 40	Germany	1939	1	tailless aircraft
DFS 194	Germany	1940	1	aerodynamic testbed for Messerschmitt Me 163
Flettner Fl 265	Germany	1939	6	intermesh rotor helicopter
Göppingen Gö 9	Germany	1941	1	tail mounted propeller testbed
Handley Page Manx	United Kingdom	1943	1	tailless aircraft
Hiller XH-44	United States	1944		coaxial rotor helicopter
Hillson Bi-mono	United Kingdom	1941	1	slip wing testbed
Kayaba Ku-2	Japan	1940	1	tailless glider
Kayaba Ku-3	Japan	1941	1	tailless glider
Kawasaki Ki-78	Japan	1942	1	high speed flight
Kellett XR-8	United States	1944	2	intermesh rotor helicopter
Lippisch DM-1	Germany	1944	1	delta-wing glider
Martin 162A Tadpole Clipper	United States	1937	1,366	half scale flyingboat
Miles M.30	United Kingdom	1942	1	blended wing
Miles M.35 Libellula	United Kingdom	1942	1	tandem wing
Miles M.39B Libellula	United Kingdom	1943	1	tandem wing/canard
Northrop N-1M	United States	1941	1	flying wing
Northrop N-9M	United States	1942	4	flying wing
Payen PA-22	France	1942	1	delta and tandem-wing
Piasecki PV-2	United States	1943	1	helicopter
Saro Shrimp	United Kingdom	1939	1	half sized flying boat
Tachikawa SS-1	Japan	1943	354	high altitude research, pressurized cabin
Vought V-173	United States	1942	1	aerodynamic testbed for Vought XF5U which never flew
Yokosuka MXY6	Japan	1943	2	aerodynamic testbed for Kyushu J7W
Yokosuka MXY8 Akigusa/Ku-13	Japan	1945		aerodynamic testbed for Mitsubishi J8M rocket interceptor

=== Engine research ===
Type	Origin	Introduced	Total	Notes
Caproni Campini N.1	Italy	1940	2	jet engine testbed
Folland Fo.108	United Kingdom	1940	12	piston engine testbed
Gloster E.28/39	United Kingdom	1941	2	jet engine testbed
Heinkel He 176	Germany	1939	1	rocket engine testbed
Heinkel He 178	Germany	1939	1	jet engine testbed

=== Misc research ===
Type	Origin	Introduced	Total	Notes
Akaflieg Berlin B 9	Germany	1944	1	prone pilot research
Heinkel He 119	Germany	1937	8	streamlining
Piaggio P.111	Italy	1941	1	high altitude research

== See also ==
- List of interwar military aircraft
- List of fighter aircraft
- List of bomber aircraft
- List of attack aircraft
- List of jet aircraft of World War II
- List of World War II military gliders
- List of aircraft of Canada's air forces
- List of aircraft of the French Air Force during World War II
- List of aircraft of Germany in World War II
- List of aircraft of Japan, World War II
- List of aircraft of Poland during World War II
- List of aircraft of the Red Army Air Forces
- List of Regia Aeronautica aircraft used in World War II
- List of aircraft of the United Kingdom in World War II
- List of aircraft of the United States during World War II
