= Ro-63 =

Ro-63 or RO-63 may refer to:

- IMAM Ro.63, an Italian reconnaissance and light transport aircraft of 1940
- Japanese submarine Ro-63, an Imperial Japanese Navy submarine commissioned in 1924 and scuttled in 1946
- RO-63, a Finnish designation for the SS.11 wire-guided anti-tank missile
