= Caproni Vizzola F.4 =

Italian fighter aircraft prototype

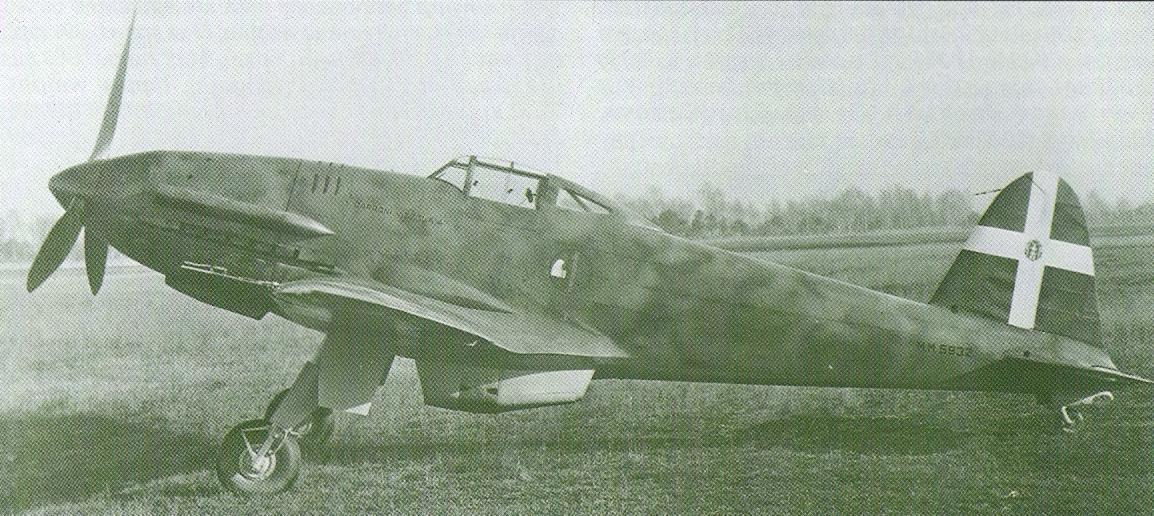

General information
- Type: Fighter
- Manufacturer: Caproni
- Designer: F. Fabrizi (design team leader)
- Number built: 1

History
- First flight: July 1940
- Variant: Caproni Vizzola F.5

The Caproni Vizzola F.4 was an Italian fighter aircraft prototype that was designed in 1937 and built from 1939. It was a single-seat, low-wing cantilever monoplane with retractable landing gear.

== Development ==
The F.4 was developed in parallel with the Caproni Vizzola F.5, with which it shared a common airframe. Design began in late 1937 by a team led by F. Fabrizi. The aircraft had a welded steel-tube fuselage and a wooden wing; the fuselage was covered with flush-riveted duralumin, while the wing had a stressed plywood skin. Fabrizi and his design team intended the F.4 (standing for Fabrizi 4) to be powered by a 12-cylinder Isotta Fraschini Asso 121 R.C.40 water-cooled engine rated for 715 kW (959 hp) at 4,000 m (13,123 ft), but the Italian Air Ministry preferred that the Asso not be used in fighters; the F.4 project therefore was halted before construction of a prototype in favor of continued development of the F.5, which employed a radial engine.

In the summer of 1939, Italy received its first Daimler-Benz DB 601A—a liquid-cooled inverted V-12 engine rated at 876 kW (1,175 hp) from Germany. This gave the F.4 project a new lease on life, as the Air Ministry approved of its use in fighters. The last of 12 pre-production F.5 aircraft ordered for the Regia Aeronautica (Italian Royal Air Force) was selected for conversion into the F.4 prototype, powered by the DB 601A. It flew for the first time in July 1940.

No further F.4s were ordered, and a proposal to build a production model powered by an Alfa Romeo-built DB 601A as the F.5bis was dropped in favor of pursuing development of the more advanced Caproni Vizzola F.6M.

== Operational history ==
The Regia Aeronautica assigned the lone F.4 prototype to the 303ª Squadriglia, which operated it experimentally during 1942.

== Operators ==
Kingdom of Italy

- Regia Aeronautica

== Variants ==
F.4
Prototype with German-built Daimler-Benz DB 601A engine

== Specifications (F.4) ==
Data from Italian Civil and Military Aircraft 1930-1945

General characteristics

- Length: 8.9 m (29 ft 2 in)
- Wingspan: 11.29 m (37 ft 0 in)
- Height: 2.90 m (9 ft 6.1 in)
- Wing area: 17.60 m^{2} (189.4 sq ft)
- Empty weight: 2,462 kg (5,428 lb)
- Gross weight: 3,000 kg (6,614 lb)
- Powerplant: 1 × Daimler-Benz DB 601A inverted V12 liquid-cooled piston engine, 876 kW (1,175 hp)

Performance

- Maximum speed: 550 km/h (340 mph, 300 kn) at 3,750 m (12,300 ft)
- Cruise speed: 489 km/h (304 mph, 264 kn)
- Range: 700 km (430 mi, 380 nmi) at 435 km/h (270 mph)
- Service ceiling: 10,000 m (33,000 ft)

Armament

- Guns: 2 × 12.7 mm (0.5 in) forward-firing Breda-SAFAT machine guns

== See also ==
Aircraft of comparable role, configuration, and era

- Caproni Vizzola F.5
