= AVIS C.4 =

C.4

General information
- Type: Liaison Monoplane
- National origin: Italy
- Manufacturer: Avio Industrie Stabiensi (AVIS)
- Designer: Ugo Abate
- Number built: 1

History
- First flight: 1940

The AVIS C.4 was a 1940s Italian liaison aircraft designed by Ugo Abate and built by Avio Industrie Stabiensi (AVIS) for an Italian Air Force requirement for a liaison aircraft with a similar role to the Fieseler Fi 156.

First flown in June 1940 the low-wing monoplane was in competition with the IMAM Ro.63 and Caproni GDL, but the results of test flights were not satisfactory and only one C.4 was built of the six originally ordered.

== Specifications ==
Data from Letadla 39–45: AV.I.S C.4

General characteristics

- Crew: 1
- Capacity: 2 passengers
- Length: 8.70 m (28 ft 7 in)
- Wingspan: 13.96 m (45 ft 10 in)
- Height: 3.00 m (9 ft 10 in)
- Wing area: 28.00 m^{2} (301.4 sq ft)
- Empty weight: 826 kg (1,821 lb)
- Max takeoff weight: 1,330 kg (2,932 lb)
- Fuel capacity: 235 L (52 imp gal; 62 US gal)
- Powerplant: 1 × Hirth HM.508D air-cooled, eight-cylinder, inverted-V piston engine, 210 kW (280 hp)

Performance

- Maximum speed: 240 km/h (150 mph, 130 kn)
- Cruise speed: 185 km/h (115 mph, 100 kn)
- Stall speed: 60 km/h (37 mph, 32 kn)
- Range: 800 km (500 mi, 430 nmi)
- Service ceiling: 6,200 m (20,300 ft)
- Time to altitude: 14 min to 4,000 m (13,000 ft)
- Takeoff distance: 35 m (115 ft)
- Landing distance: 65 m (213 ft)

== See also ==
Aircraft of comparable role, configuration, and era

- IMAM Ro.63
