= Gotha Go 146 =

Prototype utility aircraft by Gotha

Go 146

General information
- Type: Utility aircraft
- National origin: Germany
- Manufacturer: Gotha
- Designer: Albert Kalkert
- Number built: ca. 4

History
- First flight: 1936

The Gotha Go 146 was a twin-engine utility aircraft developed in Germany in the mid-1930s. It was a conventional low-wing cantilever monoplane with tailwheel undercarriage, the main units of which retracted into the engine nacelles on the wings. It was offered to the Luftwaffe as a high-speed courier aircraft, but the Siebel Fh 104 was selected instead. With Gotha unable to attract other customers, no serious production was undertaken and a small number of prototypes were the only examples built.

== Specifications ==
General characteristics

- Crew: One pilot
- Capacity: 4 passengers
- Length: 9.45 m (31 ft 0 in)
- Wingspan: 12.40 m (40 ft 8 in)
- Height: 2.70 m (8 ft 10 in)
- Wing area: 21.7 m^{2} (234 sq ft)
- Empty weight: 1,520 kg (3,350 lb)
- Gross weight: 2,200 kg (4,850 lb)
- Powerplant: 2 × Hirth HM 508E , 180 kW (240 hp) each

Performance

- Maximum speed: 335 km/h (208 mph, 181 kn)
- Range: 1,000 km (620 mi, 540 nmi)
- Service ceiling: 5,000 m (16,400 ft)
- Rate of climb: 7.5 m/s (1,470 ft/min)
