= Caproni Vizzola F.5 =

Italian fighter

F.5
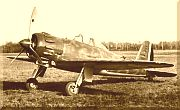

General information
- Type: Fighter
- Manufacturer: Caproni
- Primary user: Regia Aeronautica (Italian Royal Air Force)
- Number built: 13 plus 1 F.4 prototype

History
- Introduction date: ca. 1939-1940
- First flight: 19 February 1939
- Variant: Caproni Vizzola F.4(precursor) Caproni Vizzola F.6

The Caproni Vizzola F.5 was an Italian fighter aircraft that was built by Caproni. It was a single-seat, low-wing cantilever monoplane with retractable landing gear.

== Development ==
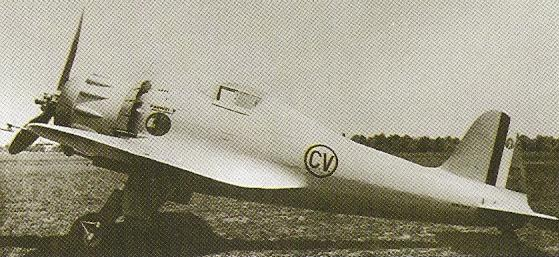
The first prototype of the Caproni Vizzola F.5.

The F.5 was developed in parallel with the Caproni Vizzola F.4, with which it shared a common airframe. Design began in late 1937 by a team led by F. Fabrizi. The aircraft had a welded steel-tube fuselage and wooden wings; the fuselage was covered with flush-riveted duralumin, while the wing had a stressed plywood skin. The F.5 (standing for Fabrizi 5) had a two-row 14-cylinder Fiat A.74 R.C. 38 radial engine, unlike its cousin the F.4, which Fabrizi and his design team intended to be powered by a water-cooled engine. The F.4 project was not pursued immediately because the Italian Ministry of Aeronautics held its proposed engine in disfavor, but development of the F.5 continued.

The F.5 prototype first flew on 19 February 1939. The aircraft displayed very high maneuverability during official testing, prompting an order for both a second prototype and 12 preproduction models. The last of the preproduction aircraft was selected for use as a prototype in a renewed F.4 program, but the rest of the F.5 order was delivered to the Italian Regia Aeronautica (Royal Air Force).

No F.5 production models were built as Caproni decided to produce the more developed Caproni Vizzola F.6M fighter instead.

== Operational history ==
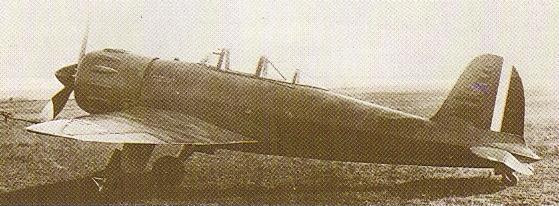
A preproduction Caproni Vizzola F.5.

The Regia Aeronautica assigned the 11 preproduction F.5 fighters to the 300° Squadriglia, 51° Stormo for operational use. By 1942, they were serving as night fighters in the 167° Gruppo.

The F.5 was offered to foreign customers. Peru purchased a license to build the F.5 in 1939, with the aircraft to be built by Caproni's Peruvian subsidiary, the Fábrica Nacional de Aviones Caproni Peru (FAN). However, the Peruvian nationalisation of FAN in 1940, followed by the signing of a military cooperation agreement between Peru and the United States in 1942 meant that no F.5s were ever built there.

== Variants ==
F.5
Prototype and preproduction aircraft, powered by a Fiat A.74 R.C. 38 radial engine, 13 built, plus a 14th airframe which was completed as the Caproni Vizzola F.4.
F.5bis
One re-engined F.5, powered by an 1,175 hp (876 kW) Alfa Romeo R.A.I000 R.C.44-la Monsonie (Monsoon) (license-built DB 601A-l) engine.
F.5 Gamma
A one- or two-seat advanced trainer aircraft with an estimated maximum speed of 254 mph (221 kn; 409 km/h), powered by a 540 hp (403 kW) Isotta Fraschini Gamma R.C.35 IS air-cooled engine, armed with one 7.7 mm (0.303 in) Breda-SAFAT machine gun. Not proceeded with.

== Operators ==
Kingdom of Italy

- Regia Aeronautica

== Specifications (F.5) ==
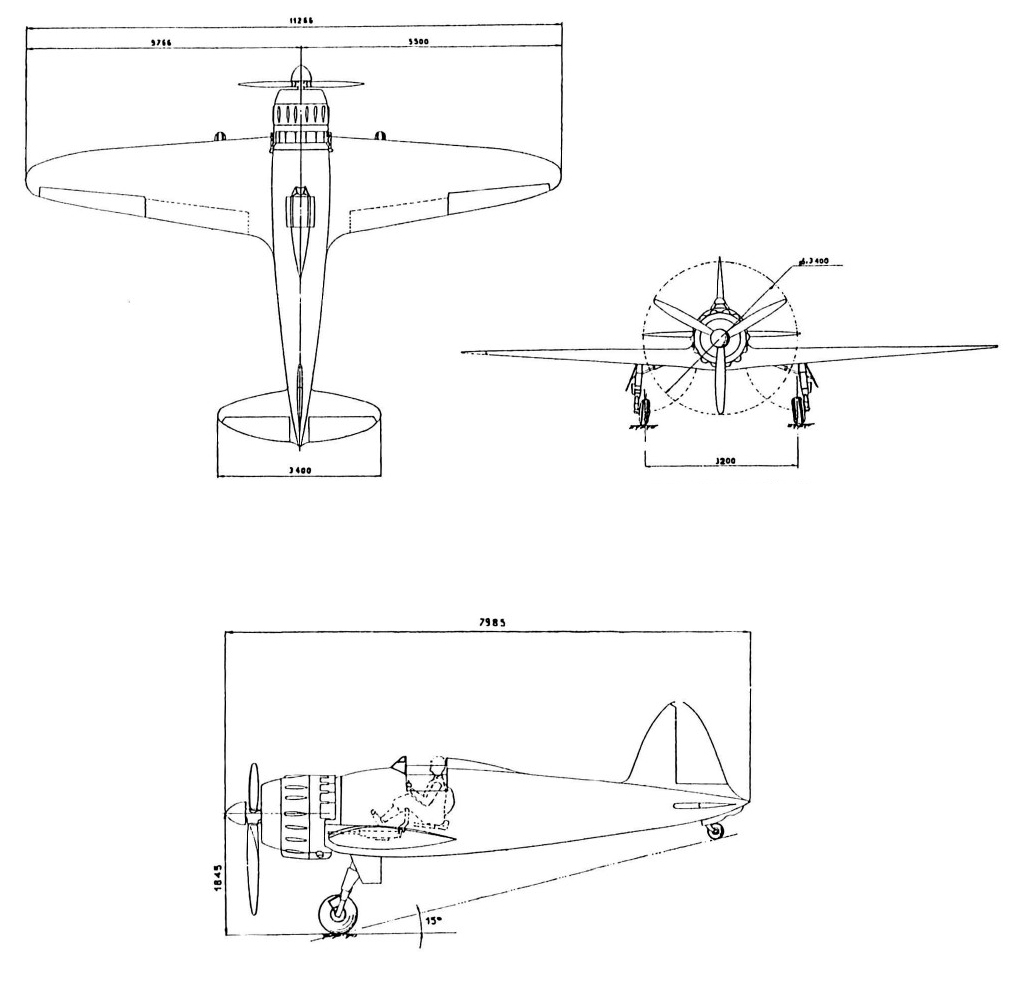
Caproni Vizzola F.5

Data from Italian Civil and Military Aircraft 1930-1945

General characteristics

- Length: 7.90 m (25 ft 11 in)
- Wingspan: 11.3 m (37 ft 1 in)
- Height: 3 m (9 ft 10 in)
- Wing area: 17.6 m^{2} (189 sq ft)
- Empty weight: 1,850 kg (4,079 lb)
- Gross weight: 2,238 kg (4,934 lb)
- Powerplant: 1 × Fiat A.74 R.C.38 14-cyl. air-cooled radial piston engine, 649 kW (870 hp) at take-off

Performance

- Maximum speed: 510 km/h (320 mph, 280 kn)
- Range: 770 km (480 mi, 420 nmi) at 455 km/h (283 mph)
- Service ceiling: 9,500 m (31,200 ft)
- Time to altitude: 6,500m (21,325ft) in 6 min 30 s

Armament

- Guns: 2 × 12.7 mm (0.5 in) forward-firing Breda-SAFAT machine guns

== See also ==
Aircraft of comparable role, configuration, and era

- Caproni Vizzola F.4
