= Borovkov-Florov I-207 =

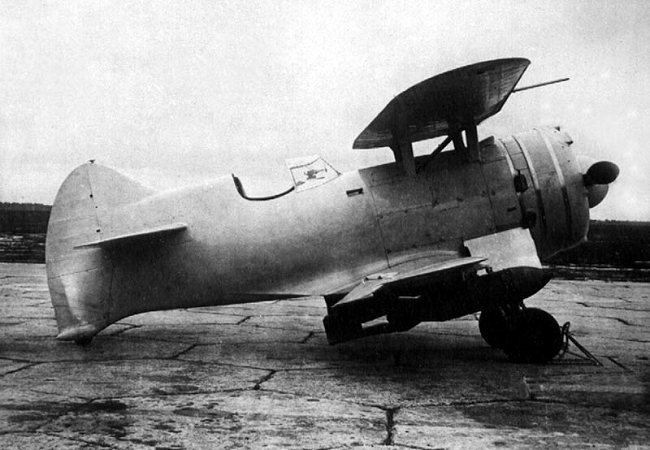

General information
- Type: Fighter
- National origin: USSR
- Designer: Alexei Andreeyevich Borovkov & Ilya Florenteyevich Florov
- Number built: 8 (maybe 5)

History
- First flight: 21 June 1937

The Borovkov-Florov I-207 (Istrebitel – fighter) was a fighter aircraft designed and built in the USSR from 1936.

== Development ==
In 1935, two designers from GAZ-21 (Gosoodarstvenny Aviatsiya Zavod – state aviation plant/factory), at Gor'ky began work on a new high-speed biplane fighter design. Borovkov and Florov drew heavily on their experience working in the Polikarpov I-16 program, producing 'Prototype No.7211' (Izdeliye 7, Zavod 21, Samolyet 1 – article 7, factory 21, aircraft 1). The goal was the smallest possible aircraft with the most powerful engine then available in the Soviet Union, the 850 hp (630 kW) Mikulin M-85 14-cylinder radial, a licensed-built Gnome-Rhône K14 Mistral Major. The No.7211 was a sleek biplane with fully cantilever outer wings, the upper centre-section being supported by four well-streamlined cabane struts. The No.7211 performed its maiden flight on 1 June 1937, but crashed on take-off due to engine failure. The first production prototype was powered by the 900 hp (670 kW) Shvetsov M-62 radial, (license-built Wright Cyclone). Retaining the open cockpit, it featured a smooth close fitting cowl, fixed landing gear, and was fully armed with four ShKAS 7.62-mm machine guns in the forward fuselage. It was first flown in April 1939 and led to improvements on the second production prototype. The second aircraft still featured the fixed gear, but had the improved Shvetsov M-63 radial of 1,000 hp (750 kW) and the lower wings were strengthened to accept either two FAB-250 bombs or Merkulov DM-4 ramjets for a rapid climb on takeoff, with a first flight in late April or early May 1939 proving its high performance - maximum airspeed 416 km/h (258.5 mph) at 5000 m (16,404 ft) and 18 m/s (3,543 ft/min) rate of climb after take-off.

One aircraft featured a retractable landing gear that rotated to lie flat in a small landing gear bay under the fuselage. This improved the top speed over the fixed gear version by 20 mph (32.5 km/h). Two aircraft reputedly saw combat in Finland during the Winter War, but there is little evidence for this. The fourth production prototype featured a fully enclosed cockpit, a geared M-63 engine and a large smooth spinner that gave the little airplane a dart-like look. Though performance was quite impressive for a biplane fighter, the type was not accepted for manufacture, and all testing came to a halt with the German invasion of 1941.

== Variants ==
- 7211 – The initial prototype aircraft, with an M-85 engine assembled from parts imported from France, crashed on first take-off due to engine failure.
- I-207 – Four prototype and pre-production aircraft with M-62 engines.
- I-207/M-63 – Three aircraft with M-63 engines plus provision for two FAB-250 bombs or two Merkulin DM-4 ramjet boosters under the lower wings. One aircraft later fitted with retractable main undercarriage retracting rearwards and rotating 90° to lie flat in the lower wings.

== Specifications (I-207) ==
Data from Gunston, Bill. “The Osprey Encyclopaedia of Russian Aircraft 1875 – 1995”. London, Osprey. 1995. ISBN 1-85532-405-9

General characteristics

- Crew: 1
- Length: 6.35 m (20 ft 10 in)
- Wingspan: 7.0 m (22 ft 11.75 in)
- Wing area: 18 m^{2} (194 sq ft)
- Empty weight: 1,598 kg (3,523 lb)
- Gross weight: 1,950 kg (4,299 lb)
- Powerplant: 1 × Shvetsov M-62 , 671 kW (900 hp)

Performance

- Maximum speed: 436 km/h (271 mph, 235 kn)
- Range: 700 km (435 mi, 378 nmi)
- Service ceiling: 9,150 m (30,020 ft)
- Rate of climb: 13.44 m/s (2,646 ft/min)

Armament

- 4 x 7.62 mm ShKAS machine-guns in the forward fuselage.

== See also ==
Aircraft of comparable role, configuration, and era

- Polikarpov I-153

Related lists

- List of aircraft
