= CANT Z.516 =

Italian WWII floatplane bomber prototype

Z.516
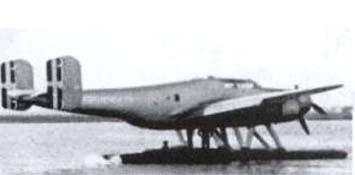

General information
- Type: Seaplane bomber
- National origin: Italy
- Manufacturer: Cantieri Aeronautici e Navali, Triestini (CANT)
- Designer: Filippo Zappata
- Number built: 1

History
- First flight: 3 August 1940
- Developed from: CANT Z.506

The CANT Z.516 was a three engine monoplane floatplane designed in Italy at the start of World War II. It did not go into service.

== Design and development ==
The Z.516 (Z denoting a Zappata design) was the result of a 1939 requirement for an improved version of the established CANT Z.506 reconnaissance bomber, which was a three engine aircraft. Work on the aircraft began in early 1940. The project was managed by the designer Filippo Zappata. It was decided to use the fuselage and power plant of a well-tested Z.1007 Alcione bomber for the construction of a seaplane. The first flight of the aircraft took place on 3 August 1940. However, the flight characteristics did not satisfy the Regia Aeronautica and work on the aircraft was stopped.

== Specifications ==
Data from

General characteristics

- Crew: 2+4
- Length: 18.38 m (60 ft 4 in)
- Wingspan: 24.8 m (81 ft 4 in)
- Height: 9.6 m (31 ft 6 in)
- Wing area: 75 m^{2} (810 sq ft)
- Empty weight: 9,800 kg (21,605 lb)
- Max takeoff weight: 13,600 kg (29,983 lb)
- Powerplant: 3 × Piaggio P.XI R.C.40 liquid cooled inverted V-12, 750 kW (1,000 hp) each
- Propellers: 3-bladed

Performance

- Maximum speed: 415 km/h (258 mph, 224 kn)
- Cruise speed: 365 km/h (227 mph, 197 kn)
- Range: 1,500 km (930 mi, 810 nmi)
- Service ceiling: 8,200 m (26,900 ft)

Armament

- Guns: 2 × 12.7 mm (0.5 in) machine gun in rotating dorsal turret; 2 × 7.7 mm (0.303 in) hand controlled machine guns
- Bombs: 800 kg

== See also ==
Related development

- CANT Z.506
