= Orlogsværftet O-Maskinen =

Military training/multi-purpose biplane

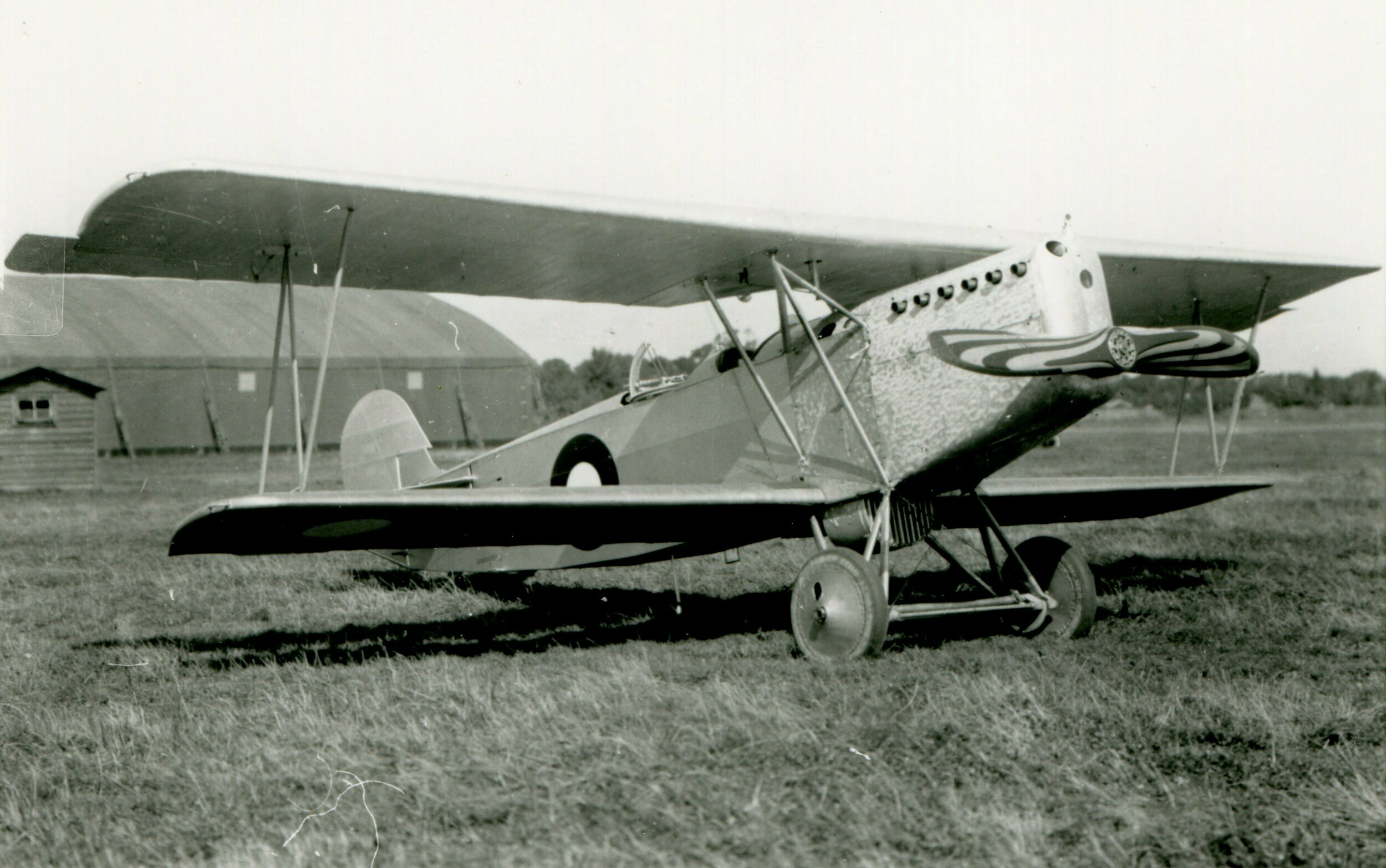
Prototype of the O-Maskinen, developed from the Fokker C.I.

The Orlogsværftet O-Maskinen was a military training/multi-purpose biplane developed by the Orlogsværftet Flying Machine Workshop in 1926. Two versions were created: the two seat IO (14 produced) and single seat IIO (1 produced).

== Specifications ==
Specifications are for IO unless otherwise noted.

- Construction: Welded steel tubing and canvas
- Seats: 2 (1 for IIO)
- Wing span: 10.66 m
- Length 8.4 m
- Height 2.7 m
- Weight empty: 1000 kg
- Weight full: 1400 kg
- Max speed: 200 km/h
- Cruise Speed 150 km/h
- Range: 500 km
- Max altitude: 6000 m
- Armament (optional): One or two 8 mm Madsen machine guns

One aircraft, registration O-70, crashed on July 23, 1931 while flying in formation with five other IOs in a training flight. Both occupants were killed.
