= Heinkel He 116 =

1930s German mail delivery airplane

He 116
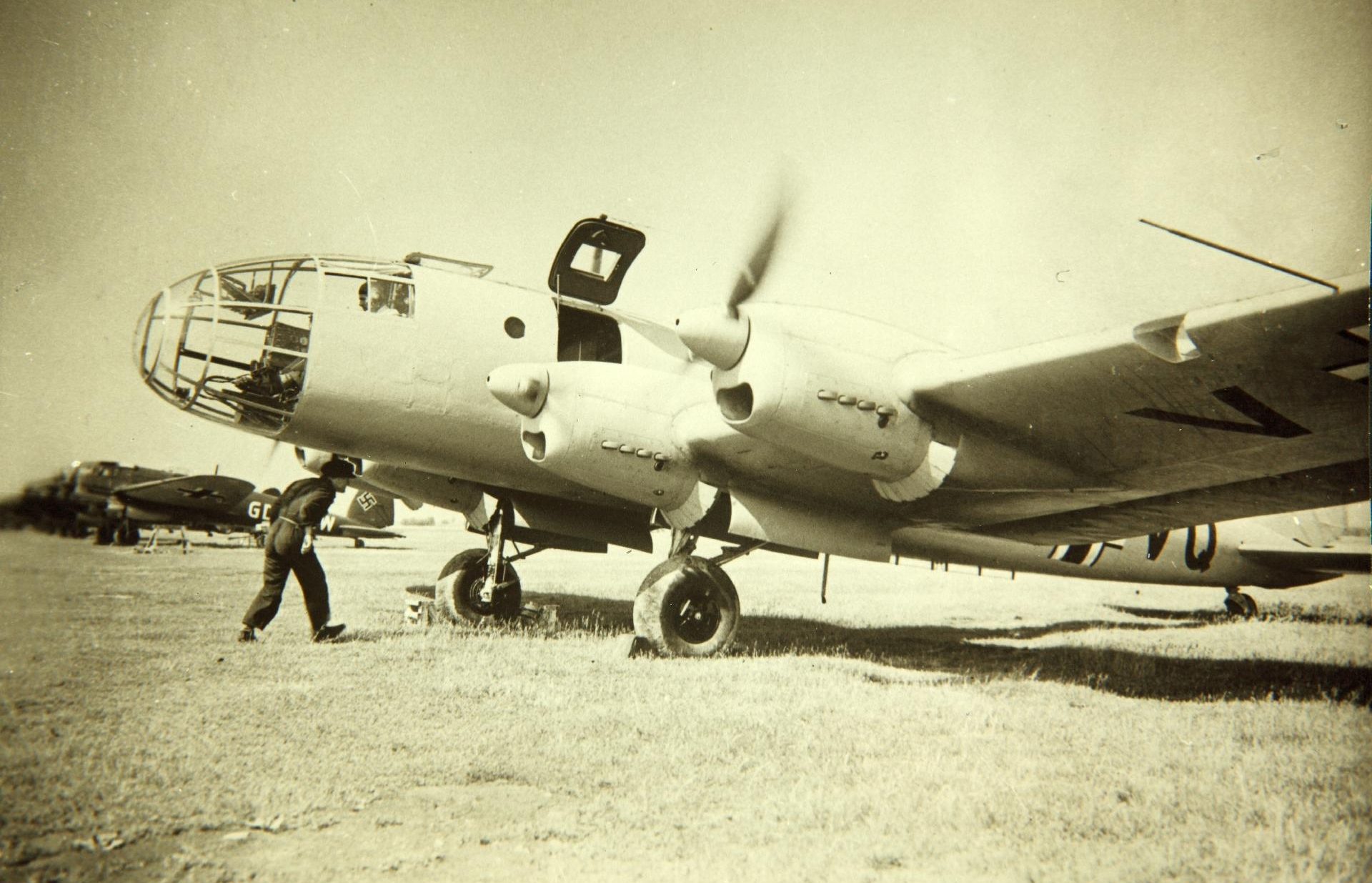
- An He 116B-0 in service with the Luftwaffe

General information
- Type: Mail plane / Reconnaissance aircraft
- Manufacturer: Heinkel
- Designer: Siegfried and Walter Günter
- Primary users: Deutsche Lufthansa Luftwaffe; Manchurian Air Transport
- Number built: 14

History
- Manufactured: 1937–1938
- First flight: 9 December 1936

The Heinkel He 116 was an extremely long-range mail plane designed and produced by the German aircraft manufacturer Heinkel.

It was designed during the latter half of the 1930s to fulfil a request by the German flag carrier Deutsche Luft Hansa for a suitable aircraft to carry long distance airmail between Germany and Japan. Derived from the He 70, furnished with an all-new semi-monocoque duralumin fuselage and powered by a total of four newly-developed Hirth HM 508C V8 inverted piston engines, the He 116 was designed specifically for this role, specifically the airline's route over the Pamir Mountains in Afghanistan. On 9 December 1936, the prototype performed its maiden flight; further aircraft were produced over the following two years.

A total of eight He 116As were produced for the mail plane role, however, the type was not only used in a civilian capacity. At the behest of the Reichsluftfahrtministerium (RLM), a pair of He 116Bs, which were specially adapted for long-range reconnaissance and bomber missions (including the use of a fully glazed nose similar to the Heinkel He 111) were created. Additionally, a single He 116R, featuring an enlarged wing, increased fuel tankage in the fuselage, and four Hirth HM 508H engines that provided superior fuel economy at lower rpms, was built for a successful record-setting flight, covering an unrefueled distance of 10,000 km (6,200 mi; 5,400 nmi) at an average speed of 214 km/h (133 mph; 116 kn), conducted on 30 June 1938.

== Development and design ==
Work on what would become the He 116 commenced in response to a request made in 1936 by the German flag carrier Deutsche Luft Hansa for a new long-distance mail plane. At that time, the airline was planning several long distance routes, in both the South Atlantic and the Far East; for the latter, it envisioned a route over the Pamir Mountains of Afghanistan. This was the primary difficulty in producing an aircraft able to meet the range requirements, because the aircraft would have to lift its large fuel load to an altitude of at least 7,600 m (24,900 ft) to clear the mountains. At the time, there were simply no engines available with that sort of altitude performance, although Hirth was working on one in the 370 kW (500 hp) class. The Günter brothers proposed to adapt their basic He 70 Blitz airframe to carry four of these engines to provide enough power for the massive fuel load.

The He 116 adopted a modified version of the He 70's twin-spar elliptical planform. Both the structure and exterior covering of the wing were wooden. The tail unit was another element drawn from He 70. The fuselage was entirely original, making use of semi-monocoque construction and being composed of duralumin. The internal volume of the fuselage was divided by a series of watertight bulkheads that would have slowed in ingress of water in the event of the aircraft being forced down over water. A retractable undercarriage was fitted.

Construction proceeded relatively quickly, by the summer of 1937, the first prototype He 116 V1 had been completed. However, due to the new engines were not ready at this point, the prototype was instead fitted with the much smaller Hirth HM 508C, which was only capable of providing up to 180 kW (240 hp). This prototype was never assigned as civil registration nor did it apparently ever conduct any regular services. A total of eight He 116As, including the prototype, would be constructed for the air mail role.

While the majority of the He 116As were operated by Deutsche Luft Hansa, two aircraft were purchased by Manchukuo (a puppet state of the Empire of Japan) for the long distance air mail services ran by Manchurian Air Transport; delivered during April 1938, these were typically flown on the Tokyo-Hsinking route.

The long range capabilities of the He 116 drew the attention of some officials within the Reichsluftfahrtministerium (RLM) for a potential conversion into a military aircraft.This led to the production of six He 116Bs, a militarised variant that could be most easily distinguished from the civil-oriented He 116A by its fully-glazed nose; the conventional crew cabin was also dispensed with. The type was evaluated in two roles: long range aerial reconnaissance and bomber. No service use of the type by the Luftwaffe is believed to have ever taken place.

The third aircraft, which reportedly received the designation He 116R, was modified so that it could establish a new long distance record. The most visually apparent change was the fitting of a different wing that had a considerably greater wingspan; other changes included increased fuel tankage within the fuselage, and the use of four Hirth HM 508H engines. On 30 June 1938, this unique aircraft successfully covered an unrefueled distance of 10,000 km (6,200 mi; 5,400 nmi) at an average speed of 214 km/h (133 mph; 116 kn), setting a new international record in the process.

== Registrations names and designations ==
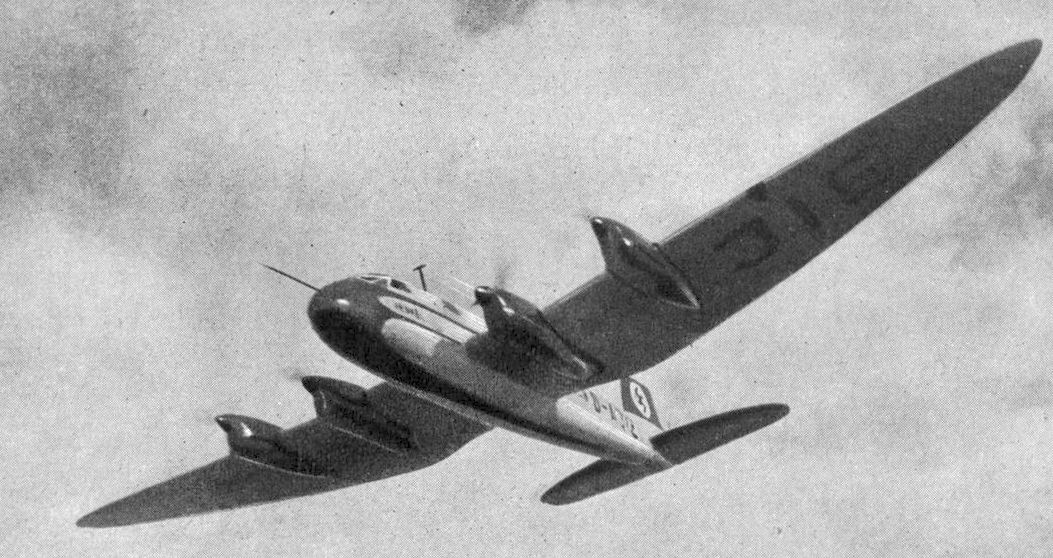
V2 Schlesien D-JAIE, in flight

V1 Lübeck
apparently remained unregistered,
V2 Schlesien D-JAIE
operated by Lufthansa.
V3 Rostock D-ARFD
(He-116A-03 / He 116R) the third prototype modified for record breaking long-distance flights.
V4 Hamburg D-ATIO
(He 116A-02) operated by Lufthansa.
V5 Nogi J-BAKD
Delivered on 29 April 1938 to Japan in a six-day flight covering 15,251 km (9,477 mi; 8,235 nmi) in 54 hours and 17 minutes of flight time. For use by Manchurian Air Transport.
V6 Tojo J-EAKF
Delivered on 29 April 1938 to Japan in a six-day flight covering 15,251 km (9,477 mi; 8,235 nmi) in 54 hours and 17 minutes of flight time. For use by Manchurian Air Transport.
V7 & V8
converted to He 116B standard as long-range reconnaissance aircraft.
V9 to V14
(He 116B-0) Six un-armed long-range reconnaissance aircraft, relegated to photo-mapping duties.

== Variants ==
He 116A
High-speed long-range Mail-plane / courier aircraft, with conventional stepped windscreen: eight aircraft built (V1 to V8)

He 116B
V7 and V8 were modified for the long-range reconnaissance role with a fully glazed un-stepped nose similar to the Heinkel He 111, tested during 1938 with generally favourable results. Six additional aircraft based on the V7 pattern were then ordered, designated He 116B-0, although they also received prototype numbers V9 to V14. The B-0 s were intended to operate at extremely long range, outside the range of enemy fighters, and therefore had no defensive armament fitted. All eight (V7 through V14) were issued to reconnaissance units prior to the war, but by that time the idea of a slow-moving unarmed plane providing any useful information seemed unlikely. Instead they were used over German territory providing mapping services.

He 116R
V3 was removed from the line to be converted into a record-breaking prototype. The modifications included a larger 75.6 m^{2} (814 sq ft) wing with a 25 m (82 ft) span, and increased fuel tankage in the fuselage. The 180 kW (240 hp) Hirth HM 508H engines provided a better fuel economy through operation at lower rpm. For take-offs with maximum fuel the He 116R, Rostock, was fitted with four RATO units. On its first record flight attempt one of the rockets tore loose and hit the wing, requiring extensive repairs. After repairs were completed, a second attempt was made on 30 June 1938, successfully covering 9,942 km (6,178 mi; 5,368 nmi) unrefueled, at an average speed of 214 km/h (133 mph; 116 kn).

== Operators ==
Germany

- Luftwaffe
- Lufthansa

Manchukuo

- Manchurian Air Transport

== Specifications (He 116A) ==
Data from German aircraft of the Second World War, Jane's all the World's Aircraft 1938

General characteristics

- Crew: four
- Capacity: 2,830 kg (6,240 lb) disposable load
- Length: 13.7 m (44 ft 11 in)
- Wingspan: 22 m (72 ft 2 in)
- Height: 3.3 m (10 ft 10 in)
- Wing area: 62.87 m^{2} (676.7 sq ft)
- Empty weight: 4,050 kg (8,929 lb)
- Gross weight: 7,130 kg (15,719 lb)
- Fuel capacity: 2,650 L (700.1 US gal; 582.9 imp gal)
- Powerplant: 4 × Hirth HM 508C V8 inverted air-cooled piston engines, 180 kW (240 hp) each
- Propellers: 2-bladed constant-speed propellers

Performance

- Maximum speed: 325 km/h (202 mph, 175 kn) at sea level; 355 km/h (221 mph; 192 kn) at 5,000 m (16,000 ft)
- Cruise speed: 300 km/h (190 mph, 160 kn) at 5,000 m (16,000 ft)
- Landing speed: 110 km/h (68 mph; 59 kn)
- Range: 4,100 km (2,500 mi, 2,200 nmi)
- Service ceiling: 6,600 m (21,700 ft) service ceiling
- Time to altitude: 1,000 m (3,300 ft) in 3 minutes and 30 seconds
- Wing loading: 113 kg/m^{2} (23 lb/sq ft)
- Power/mass: 0.06 hp/lb (0.099 kW/kg)

== See also ==
Related lists

- List of military aircraft of Germany
