= Hirth HM 508 =

1930s German 8-cylinder inverted-V aircraft engine

HM 508
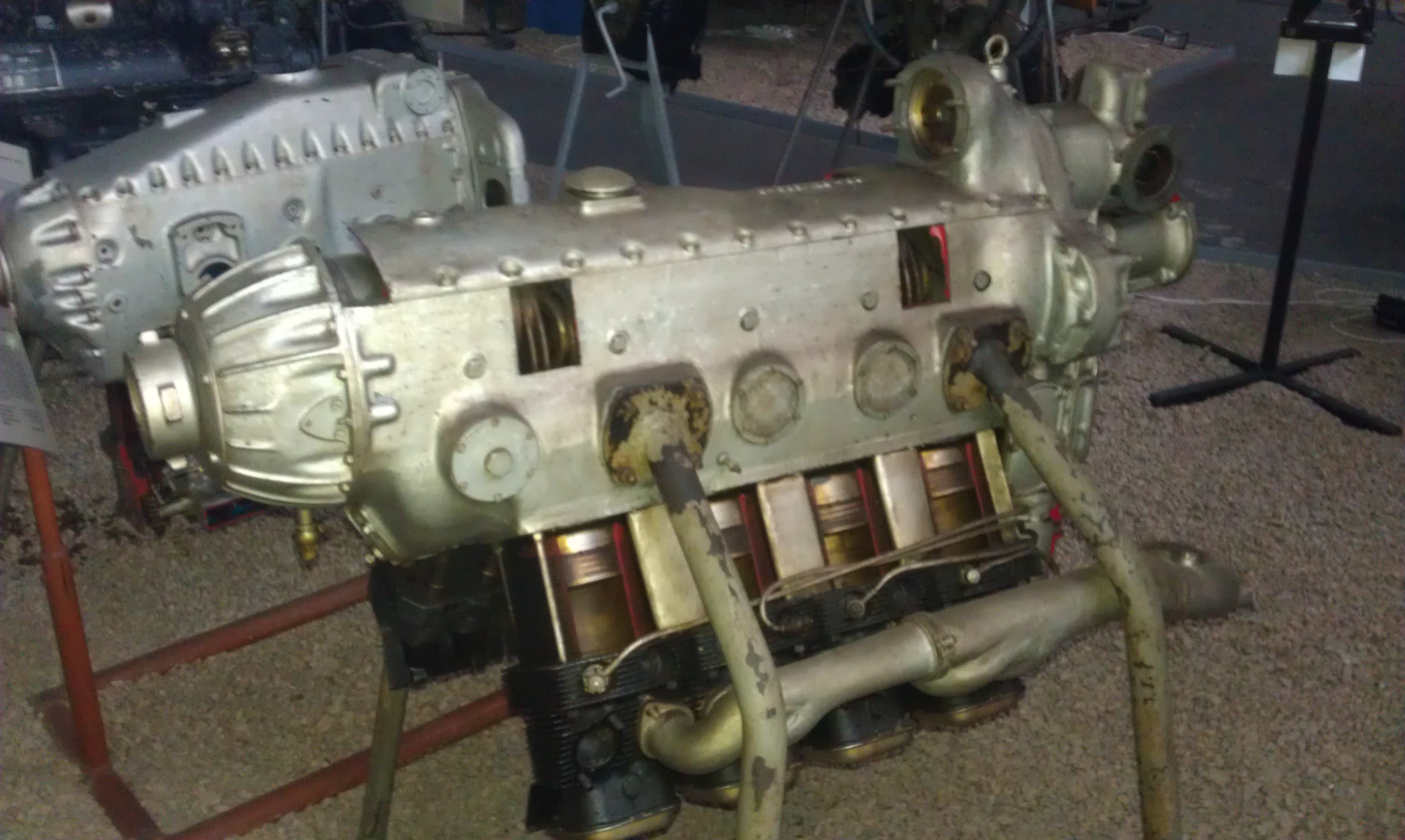
- Type: Inline inverted 'V' piston engine
- Manufacturer: Hirth
- Major applications: Messerschmitt Bf 108

The Hirth HM 508 was an air-cooled, inverted, 60° V8 aircraft engine built in Germany in the 1930s. It had a bore and stroke of 105 mm × 115 mm (4.1 in × 4.5 in) and developed 210 kW (280 hp) at 3,000 rpm.

== Variants ==
HM 8U
HM 508A
HM 508B
HM 508C
270 PS (266 hp; 199 kW)
HM 508D
280 PS (276 hp; 206 kW) at 3000 rpm
HM 508E
150 kW (200 hp)
HM 508F
HM 508G
HM 508H
180 kW (240 hp), low fuel consumption variant, with centrifugal supercharger geared at 3.86:1 crankshaft speed for long-range record breaking aircraft.

== Applications ==
- Ambrosini S.7
- Gotha Go 146
- Gotha Go 149
- Heinkel He 116
- IMAM Ro.63
- Messerschmitt Bf 108
- Siebel Fh 104
- Weserflug We 271 Experimental aircraft

== Specifications (HM 508D) ==
Data from Flugzeug-Typenbuch. Handbuch der deutschen Luftfahrt- und Zubehör-Industrie 1944, Jane's fighting aircraft of World War II, Jane's all the World's Aircraft 1938

=== General characteristics ===
- Type: Inverted 60° V8 air-cooled piston engine
- Bore: 105 mm (4.13 in)
- Stroke: 115 mm (4.53 in)
- Displacement: 7.96 L (486 cu in)
- Length: 1,292 mm (50.87 in)
- Width: 683 mm (26.89 in)
- Height: 815 mm (32.09 in)
- Dry weight: 222 kg (489 lb) dry, unequipped

241 kg (531 lb) wet, equipped

=== Components ===
- Valvetrain: 1 inlet and 1 exhaust under-valve per cylinder driven by pushrods and rockers
- Supercharger: Centrifugal supercharger geared at 4.47:1 crankshaft speed
- Fuel system: 2x Pallas-Zenith 65 VAH2 carburetors
- Fuel type: 87 Octane gasoline
- Oil system: Pressure system for crankshaft, pistons and reduction gear at 1.5–2.5 atm (22.04–36.74 psi; 1.52–2.53 bar): splash lubrication for camshaft and supercharger
- Cooling system: Air-cooled
- 1x Double Bosch magneto

=== Performance ===
- Power output:

- 280 PS (276 hp; 206 kW) at 3,000 rpm (5 minutes) at sea level
- 258 PS (254 hp; 190 kW) at 2,920 rpm (30 minutes) at sea level
- 225 PS (222 hp; 165 kW) at 2,790 rpm (max. continuous) at sea level

- Compression ratio: 6.2:1
- Specific fuel consumption: 0.220 kg/PSh (0.492 lb/(hp⋅h); 0.299 kg/kWh) at max continuous
- Oil consumption: 0.005 kg/PSh (0.011 lb/(hp⋅h); 0.007 kg/kWh) at max continuous
- Power-to-weight ratio: 1.266 PS/kg (0.566 hp/lb; 0.931 kW/kg)
- B.M.E.P.: 10.2 atm (10.3 bar; 150 psi)
- Reduction gear: Stoekicht sun and planet gears 0.666:1

== See also ==
Comparable engines

- Argus As 10

Related lists

- List of aircraft engines
