= Caproni Vizzola F.6 =

World War II-era Italian fighter aircraft

F.6
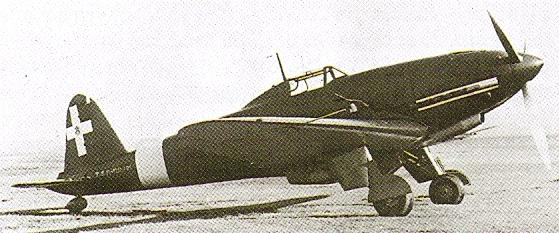
- The Caproni Vizzola F.6M prototype after replacement of the radiator under its nose with a ventral radiator

General information
- Type: Fighter
- Manufacturer: Caproni
- Primary user: Regia Aeronautica
- Number built: 2

History
- First flight: F.6M: September 1941; F.6Z: August 1943

The Caproni Vizzola F.6 was a World War II-era Italian fighter aircraft built by Caproni. It was a single-seat, low-wing cantilever monoplane with retractable landing gear. Only two prototypes were built, one designated F.6M and the other designated F.6Z.

== Development ==
=== F.6M ===
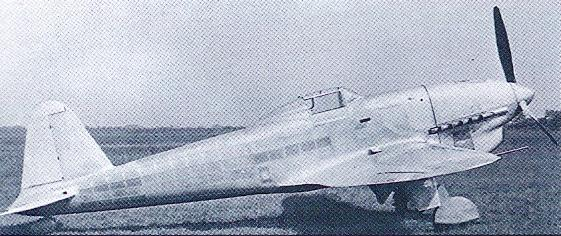
The Caproni Vizzola F.6M prototype as originally built with a deep radiator under the nose. It was later removed and replaced by a ventral radiator in order to reduce aerodynamic drag.

The F.6 design was the result of a project to adapt the airframe of the Italian Caproni Vizzola F.5 fighter with the German Daimler-Benz DB 605A liquid-cooled inverted V-12 engine. To accomplish this, the Caproni company retained the F.5 fuselage but designed metal wings to replace the wood wings of the F.5. The new aircraft was designated F.6M, with "F" standing for Fabrizi, the designer of the F.5, and "M" for Metallico. It was designed to carry twice the offensive armament of the F.5, with four instead of two 12.7-millimeter (0.50-inch) Breda-SAFAT machine guns; the prototype F.6M flew with two of these mounted in the fuselage and provision for two more in the wings, although the wing guns were never mounted.

The F.6M prototype first flew in September 1941, using a large radiator mounted under the nose, just behind the propeller. Flight testing showed that this location produced significant aerodynamic drag, and the prototype was reworked to mount the radiator on the belly, aft of the pilot position.

The sole F.6M prototype was damaged in a collision at Bresso airfield. After this accident, Caproni decided to end the F.6M project and instead concentrate on the more advanced Caproni Vizzola F.7 fighter.

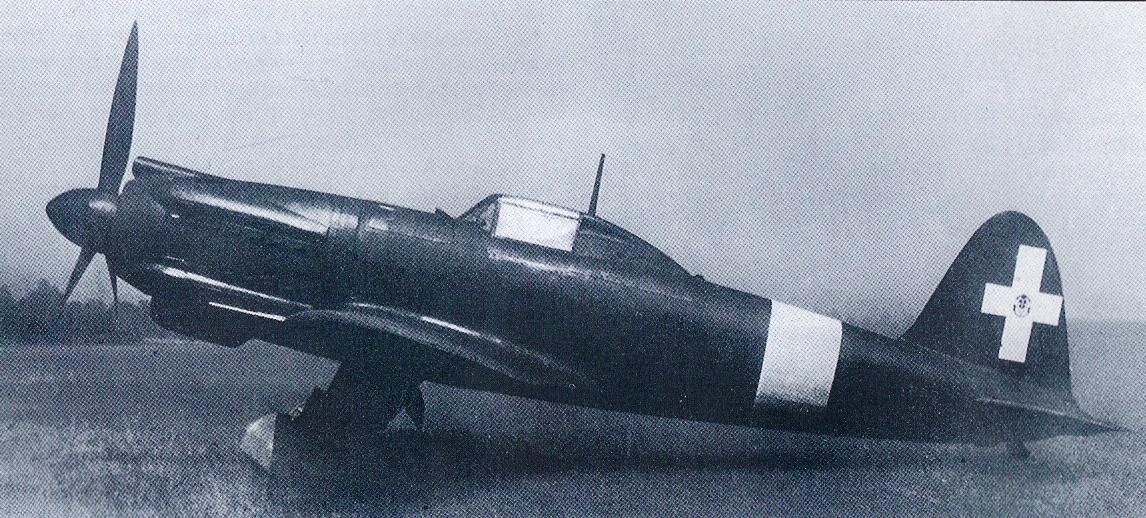
The Caproni Vizzola F.6Z prototype.

=== F.6Z ===
Shortly after Caproni began to design the F.6M, it began work on a second F.6 prototype, this one designed to use the Isotta Fraschini Zeta R.C.25/60 24-cylinder X-type engine and designated the F.6Z, with "Z" standing for Zeta. The aircraft was to carry three 12.7-millimeter (0.50-inch) Breda-SAFAT machine guns, one in the fuselage and two in the wings. Problems with engine development greatly delayed the F.6Z, but it finally flew in August 1943.

Testing in August and September 1943 showed that the Zeta engine, although rated at 1,100 kilowatts (1,500 horsepower), was producing only 900 kilowatts (1,200 horsepower), and this problem was not solved before the World War II Italian armistice with the Allies on 8 September 1943. This brought the F.6Z project to an end. The sole F.6Z prototype was the only fighter to be powered by the Zeta engine. One other fighter type, the Reggiane Re.2004 was also planned with this engine, but was not realized.

== Operators ==
Kingdom of Italy

- Regia Aeronautica

== Variants ==
F.6M
First prototype, powered by a German-built Daimler-Benz DB 605A engine
F.6Z
Second prototype, powered by an Isotta Fraschini Zeta R.C.25/60 engine
F.7
An extensively revised F.6 powered by a 1,175 h.p. Alfa Romeo R.A.1000 R.C.44-la Monsone (Monsoon), (license-built DB 601A-l) engine. Development abandoned with the September 1943 armistice.

== Specifications (F.6M) ==
Data from

General characteristics

- Crew: one
- Length: 9.15 m (30 ft 0.25 in)
- Wingspan: 11.35 m (37 ft 3 in)
- Height: 3.02 m (9 ft 11 in)
- Wing area: 18.81 m^{2} (202.5 sq ft)
- Aspect ratio: 6.85
- Empty weight: 2,265 kg (4,993 lb)
- Gross weight: 2,885 kg (6,360 lb)
- Powerplant: 1 × Daimler-Benz DB 605A V-12 inverted liquid-cooled piston engine, 1,200 kW (1,600 hp)
- Propellers: 3-bladed

Performance

- Maximum speed: 569 km/h (354 mph, 307 kn) at 5,000 m (16,000 ft)
- Range: 950 km (590 mi, 513 nmi) at 477 km/h (296 mph)
- Wing loading: 155.4 kg/m^{2} (31.4 lb/sq ft)
- Power/mass: 2.63 kg/kW

Armament

- Guns: 4 × 12.7 mm (0.5 in) forward-firing Breda-SAFAT machine guns

== See also ==
Aircraft of comparable role, configuration, and era

- Caproni Vizzola F.5
- Curtiss P-40 Warhawk
- Fiat G.55 Centauro
- Hawker Hurricane Mk.IIc
- Kawasaki Ki-61
- Lavochkin La-5
- Macchi C.205 Veltro
- Messerschmitt Bf 109G
- Mikoyan-Gurevich MiG-3
- Reggiane Re.2005 Sagittario
- Supermarine Spitfire
- Yakovlev Yak-1
