= IMAM Ro.63 =

Ro.63
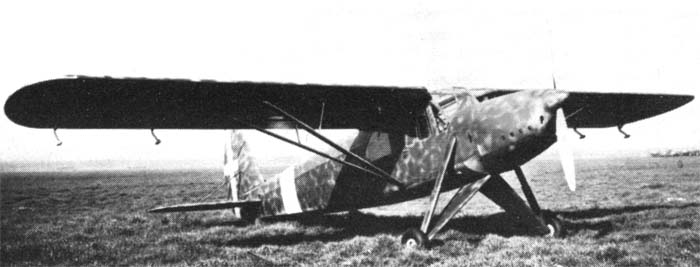

General information
- Type: Reconnaissance
- Manufacturer: Industrie Meccaniche e Aeronautiche Meridionali (IMAM)
- Designer: Giovanni Galasso
- Primary user: Regia Aeronautica
- Number built: 6

History
- First flight: June 1940

The IMAM Ro.63 was an Italian STOL aircraft designed for short-range reconnaissance and light transport during World War II.

== Development and design ==
Interest in a STOL aircraft was raised by the Fieseler Fi 156 Storch acquired from Germany, and in June 1939 the Regia Aeronautica asked Italian aircraft companies to design a similar machine (see below).

The IMAM Ro.63 was of mixed construction with wood, fabric and metal used for the fuselage and wings. It first flew in June 1940, just at the outbreak of World War II. It was put into competition with another Italian aircraft, but clearly proved superior.

It had STOL capabilities similar to the Fi.156, but the larger fuselage held up to four people, and the wings held more fuel. The 190 kW (250 hp) Hirth HM 508 engine and constant speed propeller helped to give it a maximum speed of 240 km/h (149 mph) and almost 1,000 km (621 mi) range. However, there was no defensive armament, as the Fi 156 had from the C version onwards.

The aircraft, designed by Giovanni Galasso, and tested by Aldo Ligabò, could have been a success, but although 150 were ordered, only six were produced from mid-1940 to 1941, due to the shortage of available engines, the Italian engine industry having failed to produce enough suitable Isotta Fraschini Beta engines.

The Ro.63 was a viable machine that was not put into production in significant numbers (practically only a pre-series production) despite the fact that development was completed pre-war. They were doomed by lack of Italian-built engines. The performance was better than the Fi 156, with a superior speed and endurance, and only slightly inferior STOL capabilities. This was due to the more powerful engine and the two-speed propeller.

== Operational service ==
The aircraft was deployed in the North African Campaign, together with 30 Fieseler Fi 156 imported from Germany, even though this was insufficient to replace the IMAM Ro.37 and older reconnaissance aircraft. By 1943, after two years hard service, only one Ro.63 survived. In 1948 it was proposed to resume production, but lack of capacity and data about the aircraft meant that the project was eventually abandoned.

== Other STOL aircraft ==
Other STOL aircraft in the same competition as the Ro.63 included the AVIS C.4 and Caproni GDL. The Avis C.4 had unsatisfactory results. The Caproni GDL, was not completed.

== Operators ==
Kingdom of Italy

- Regia Aeronautica

== Specifications (Ro.63) ==
Data from Italian Civil and Military aircraft 1930–1945

General characteristics

- Crew: 1
- Capacity: 1–2
- Length: 9.60 m (31 ft 6 in)
- Wingspan: 13.500 m (44 ft 3 1/2 in)
- Height: 2.354 m (7 ft 8 2/3 in)
- Gross weight: 1,058 kg (2,332 lb)
- Max takeoff weight: 1,482 kg (3,267 lb)
- Powerplant: 1 × Hirth HM 508D inverted V-8 air-cooled piston engine, 190 kW (250 hp)

Performance

- Maximum speed: 203 km/h (126 mph, 109 kn)
- Range: 900 km (560 mi, 490 nmi)

== Gallery ==
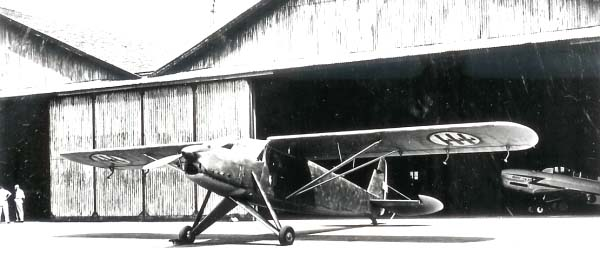

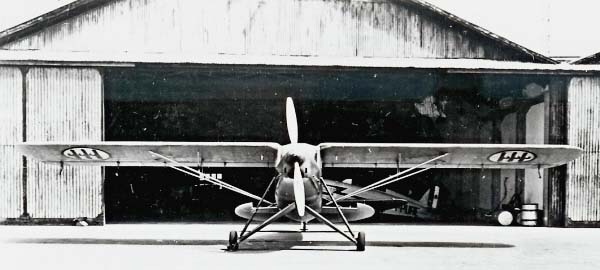

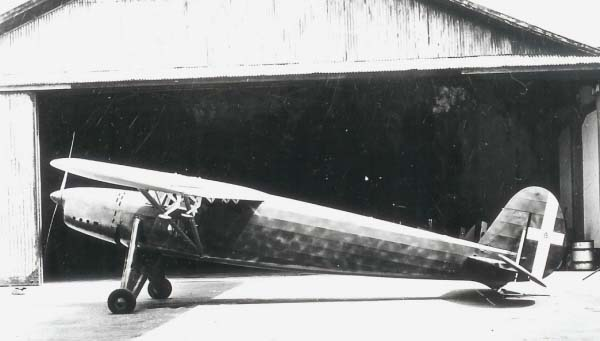
Other views

== See also ==
Aircraft of comparable role, configuration, and era

- AVIS C.4
- Fieseler Fi 156
- Kobeseiko Te-Gō
- Kokusai Ki-76
- Taylorcraft L-2
- Westland Lysander

Related lists

- List of Regia Aeronautica aircraft used in World War II

== Bibliography ==
- Lembo, Daniele Officine Meccaniche Meridionali, Aerei nella storia magazione, Delta editions, Parma, Oct–Nov 2003 (in Italian)
- enricopezzi.it (in Italian)
- Thompson, Jonathan W. (1963). Italian Civil and Military aircraft 1930–1945 (1st ed.). New York: Aero Publishers Inc. ISBN 0-8168-6500-0.
