= Nardi =

Nardi may refer to:

== Industrial ==
- Nardi (agricultural machinery manufacturer), Italian manufacturer of agricultural machinery
- Nardi (carmaker), an Italian automobile and racing car maker
- Nardi 750LM, an automobile, one of the starters for the 1955 24-hour Le Mans race
- Fratelli Nardi, an Italian aircraft manufacturer formed in the early 1930s
  - Nardi FN.305, a fighter trainer and liaison monoplane, 1935
  - Nardi FN.310, a four-seat touring monoplane, 1936
  - Nardi FN.315, a training monoplane, 1938
  - Nardi FN.316, an advanced fighter trainer monoplane, 1941
  - Nardi FN.333, a luxury touring amphibious aircraft, 1952

== People ==
- Andrew Nardi (b. 1998), American baseball player
- Luca Nardi (b. 2003), Italian tennis player

== Places ==
- Licciana Nardi, a commune in the Province of Massa and Carrara, Tuscany, Italy
- Mount Nardi, a mountain in New South Wales, Australia

== Science ==
- 26268 Nardi, a minor planet in the main asteroid belt
- Nardi test, a medical diagnostic test
- Quassia sp. 'Mount Nardi', a plant found in northeastern New South Wales, Australia

== Other uses ==
- Nardi (game), a Russian tables game played on a backgammon board
- Nardi (name), including a list of people with the name

== See also ==
- Nardis (disambiguation)
- De Nardi, a cycling team based in Italy, 1999–2005
