= Fiat G.2 =

Italian airliner

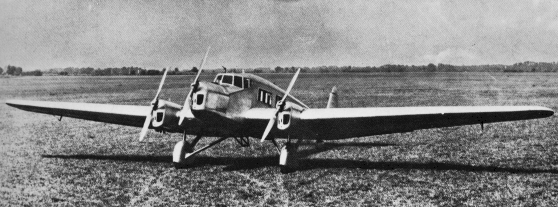

General information
- Type: Three-engine transport monoplane
- Manufacturer: Fiat
- Designer: Giuseppe Gabrielli
- Primary user: ALI

History
- First flight: 1932

The Fiat G.2 was an Italian three-engine six-passenger monoplane transport aircraft designed by Giuseppe Gabrielli and built by Fiat.

== Development ==
The G.2 was an important step for the Fiat company as their first low-wing cantilever monoplane. The structure was all-metal, with fabric-covered control surfaces. The wide-track tailwheel undercarriage was not retractable, and its mainwheels were covered by spats. The tailwheel (not a tailskid) was castering (free-pivoting).

The aircraft was powered by three Fiat A.60 inline piston engines, with one mounted on the fuselage nose and the other two in wing-mounted nacelles. Variants were also produced with other engine installations. The enclosed cabin had space for six passengers.

The prototype first flew in 1932.

Although the G.2 represented a promising design, it failed to sell and operated only a limited service with the ALI airline between Turin and Milan.

== Variants ==
G.2
Variant powered by three 101 kW (135 hp) Fiat A.60 inline engines.
G.2/2
Variant powered by three 97 kW (130 hp) Alfa Romeo 110-1 inline engines.
G.2/3
Variant powered by three 90 kW (120 hp) de Havilland Gipsy Major inline engines.
G.2/4
Variant powered by three 104 kW (139 hp) Fiat A.54 radial engines.

== Operators ==
Brazil

- Aerovias Minas Gerais
- Varig

Kingdom of Italy

- ALI

== Specifications (G.2) ==
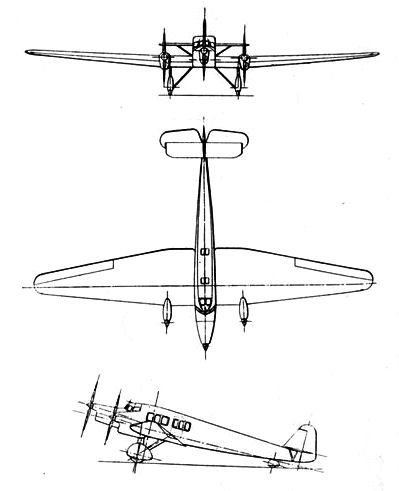
Fiat G.2 3-view drawing from L'Aerophile November 1932

Data from The Illustrated Encyclopedia of Aircraft (Part Work 1982-1985), 1985, Orbis Publishing, Page 1796

General characteristics

- Crew: one
- Capacity: six passengers
- Length: 11.89 m (39 ft 0 in)
- Wingspan: 18.01 m (59 ft 1 in)
- Height: 3.51 m (11 ft 6 in)
- Wing area: 39 m^{2} (420 sq ft)
- Empty weight: 1,630 kg (3,594 lb)
- Gross weight: 2,500 kg (5,512 lb)
- Powerplant: 3 × Fiat A.60 4-cylinder inverted inline piston engine , 101 kW (135 hp) each

Performance

- Maximum speed: 235 km/h (146 mph, 127 kn)
- Range: 700 km (430 mi, 380 nmi)
- Service ceiling: 4,200 m (13,800 ft)

== See also ==
Aircraft of comparable role, configuration, and era

- Breda Ba.32
- CANT Z.1012
- Couzinet 70
- Spartan Cruiser

Related lists

- Trimotor
