= Aerolloyd Iguassú =

Brazilian airline

- Founded: 1933
- Commenced operations: 1933
- Ceased operations: 1939
- Parent company: Matte Leão
- Headquarters: Curitiba, Brazil

Aerolloyd Iguassú S.A., was a Brazilian airline founded in 1933. In 1939 it was sold to VASP.

== History ==
Aerolloyd Iguassú was founded in the beginning of 1933, in Curitiba, Brazil with initial financial support from the mate manufacturer Matte Leão. Initially two 3-passenger Klemm Kl 31A were bought and on July 20, 1933, flights between Curitiba and São Paulo started. In 1934, a second route to Joinville started and further extended to Florianópolis in 1935. That same year, three 5-seat Stinson Reliant arrived.

The airline faced serious technical difficulties related to the region where it operated – it is mountainous and subject to frequent weather changes, and to the lack of experienced pilots. Maintenance was also difficult because of lack of specialized mechanics. Finally on October 28, 1939, the airline was sold to VASP, which was particularly interested in the operational rights to fly from São Paulo southbound.

== Destinations ==
Aerolloyd Iguassú served the following locations:,

- Curitiba
- Florianópolis
- Itajaí
- Joinville
- São Paulo

== Fleet ==
Aerolloyd Iguassú fleet
Aircraft	Total	Years of operation	Notes
Klemm Kl.31A	2	1933–1939	
Stinson Reliant	3	1934–1939	

== See also ==
- List of defunct airlines of Brazil

== Sources ==
- Davies, R.E.G. (1984). Airlines of Latin America Since 1919. Smithsonian Institution Press. pp. 390–391. ISBN 978-0-87474-358-6.
