= Isotta Fraschini Beta =

1940s Italian aircraft piston engine

Beta
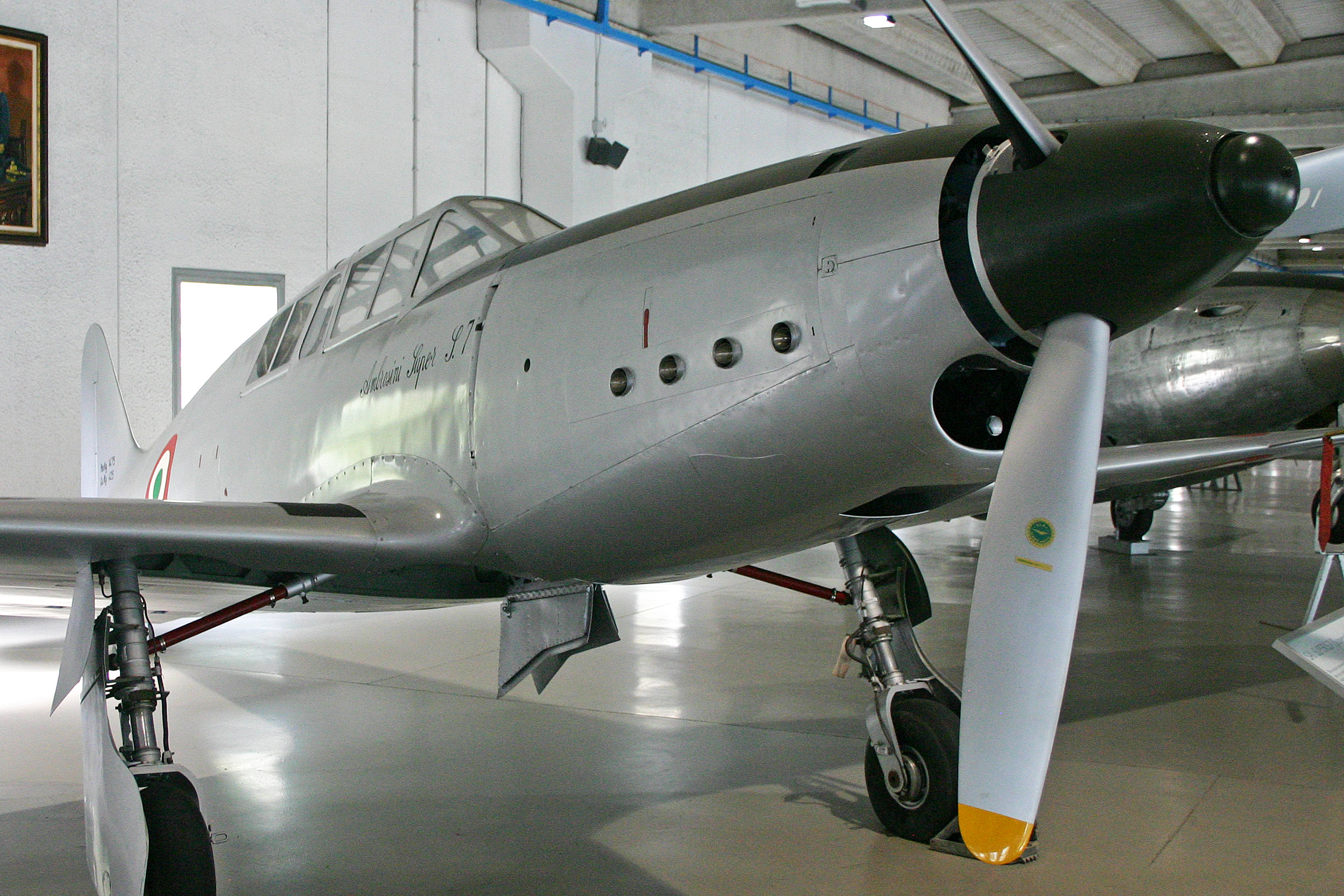
- The Ambrosini SAI.7
- Type: Piston aircraft engine
- National origin: Italy
- Manufacturer: Isotta Fraschini
- Developed from: Isotta Fraschini Gamma

The Isotta Fraschini Beta was an air cooled aircraft engine produced by the Italian engineering company Isotta Fraschini in the 1940s. Isotta Fraschini derived the Beta inverted 6-cylinder in-line aircraft engine from the V12 Gamma. The engine saw limited production for aircraft, including the Nardi FN.316 and Ambrosini SAI.7, but was generally unsatisfactory in service.

== Design and development ==
Isotta Fraschini had developed V12 Gamma aircraft engine, which gained some success, powering the Ambrosini SAI.107 lightweight fighter. The company took essentially half of the engine and created the Beta inverted 6-cylinder in-line aircraft engine. The Beta shared the larger engine's bore and stroke. The engine had a one-piece aluminium alloy crankcase with steel and aluminium cylinders, each with a single inlet and a single exhaust valve. It had a carburettor designed by Isotta Fraschini and a single speed supercharger.

The Beta was produced in small numbers and fitted to a number of Italian training aircraft, including the Nardi FN.316 used in limited quantities by the Regia Aeronautica, Aeronautica Nazionale Repubblicana and German Luftwaffe during World War II. However, the engine was unsatisfactory in service, its failure leading to the cancellation of the IMAM Ro.63 STOL reconnaissance aircraft.

== Variants ==
Beta R.C.10 ISZ
300 hp (224 kW) for take-off 270 hp (201 kW) at 1,500 m (4,921 ft).

== Applications ==
- CANSA C.6.
- IMAM Ro.63.
- Nardi FN.316.
- Ambrosini SAI.7.

== Specifications ==
Data from Wilkinson, 1945

=== General characteristics ===
- Type: 6-cylinder air cooled inverted in-line aircraft piston engine
- Bore: 125 mm (4.9 in)
- Stroke: 130 mm (5.1 in)
- Displacement: 9.6 L (586 in^{3})
- Length: 1,625 mm (64.0 in)
- Width: 410 mm (16 in)
- Height: 800 mm (31 in)
- Dry weight: 225 kg (496 lb)

=== Components ===
- Valvetrain: Two valves per cylinder with overhead camshaft
- Supercharger: Single stage, 10.0:1
- Fuel type: 87 octane petrol
- Cooling system: Air-cooled
- Reduction gear: 0.79:1

=== Performance ===
- Power output:
  - (Take-off) 300 hp (224 kW) at 2700 rpm
  - (Normal) 270 hp (201 kW) at 2500 rpm at 4,600 m (15,100 ft)
  - (Cruising) 210 hp (157 kW) at 2200 rpm at 4,600 m (15,100 ft)
- Specific power: 23.5 kW/L (0.51 hp/in³)
- Compression ratio: 6.5:1
- Fuel consumption: 320 g/(hp•h) (0.53 lb/(hp•h))
- Oil consumption: 9.3 g/(hp•h) (0.02 lb/(hp•h))
- Power-to-weight ratio: 1.00 kW/kg (0.61 hp/lb)

== See also ==
Related development

- Isotta Fraschini Gamma
- Isotta Fraschini Zeta

Comparable engines

- Alfa Romeo 115
- Argus As 17
- de Havilland Gipsy Queen
- Menasco C6S Super Buccaneer
- Renault 6P

Related lists

- List of aircraft engines
