= Nardi (name) =

Nardi is a surname and sometimes used as a given name. Notable people with the name include:

- Aldo Nardi (1931–2001), Italian football player
- Andrew Nardi (born 1998), American baseball player
- Angelo Nardi (painter) (1584–1664), Italian painter active in Spain
- Antonio Nardi (1548–1648?), Tuscan man of letters and mathematician
- Archimede Nardi (born 1916), Italian football player
- Bonnie Nardi (born 1950), American anthropologist
- Caesar Nardi (died 1633), Roman Catholic Bishop of Ossero
- Clarine Nardi Riddle (born 1949), American Attorney General of Connecticut
- Daniela Nardi, Canadian singer-songwriter
- Enrico Nardi (1907–1966), Italian racing car driver
- Filippo Nardi (born 1998), Italian footballer
- François Nardi (1861–1936), French painter
- Gloria Nardi (born 2000), Italian racing cyclist
- Gregorio Nardi (born 1964), Italian pianist and musicologist
- Jacopo Nardi (1476–1563), Italian historian
- John Nardi (1916–1977), American mobster
- José Carlos De Nardi (born 1944), Brazilian general
- Luca Nardi (born 2003), Italian tennis player
- Marcia Nardi (1901–1990), American poet and book reviewer
- Maria Nardi (born 1935), Italian swimmer
- Mariacristina De Nardi, Italian economist
- Marie-Ange Nardi (born 1961), French television presenter
- Mauro Nardi, stage name of Antonio Borrelli (born 1954), Italian singer
- Michele Nardi (born 1986), Italian footballer
- Mike Nardi (born 1985), American basketball player
- Nahum Nardi (1901–1977), Israeli composer
- Paul Nardi (born 1994), French footballer
- Rafaela Chacón Nardi (1926–2001), Cuban poet and educator
- Ricardo Alberto Gareca Nardi (born 1958), Argentine football manager and player
- Shulamith Nardi (1909–2002), American Israeli translator, editor, speaker
- Tonino Nardi (1939–1993), Italian cinematographer
- Tony Nardi (born 1958), Canadian actor, playwright, Director, and producer
- Uldericus Nardi (1637–1705), Roman Catholic Bishop of Bagnoregio

== Given name ==
- Nardi Contreras (born 1951), American baseball player
- Nardi Simpson (born 1975), Australian musician and writer
- Nardi Suxo (born 1961), Bolivian lawyer, sociologist, and politician

== See also ==
- Nardi (disambiguation)
- Nardis (disambiguation)
