= Aerovias Minas Gerais =

Brazilian airline

- Founded: 1944
- Commenced operations: 1945
- Ceased operations: 1949
- Headquarters: Belo Horizonte, Brazil

Aerovias S/A Minas Gerais was a Brazilian airline founded in 1944. It went bankrupt in 1949.

== History ==
Aerovias Minas Gerais was founded on February 7, 1944, and flights started in 1945. The airline was grounded on November 23, 1949, and went bankrupt.

== Destinations ==
Aerovias Minas Gerais served cities in Minas Gerais.

== Fleet ==
Aerovias Minas Gerais fleet
Aircraft	Total	Years of operation	Notes
Stinson SM-8A	1	1944–1946	
Stinson SR-8B Reliant	2	1944–1945	
Fiat G.2	1	1945–1946	
Douglas DC-2/C-39	4	1946–1949	

== See also ==
- List of defunct airlines of Brazil
