= Stinson Reliant =

High-wing monoplane produced 1933-43

Reliant
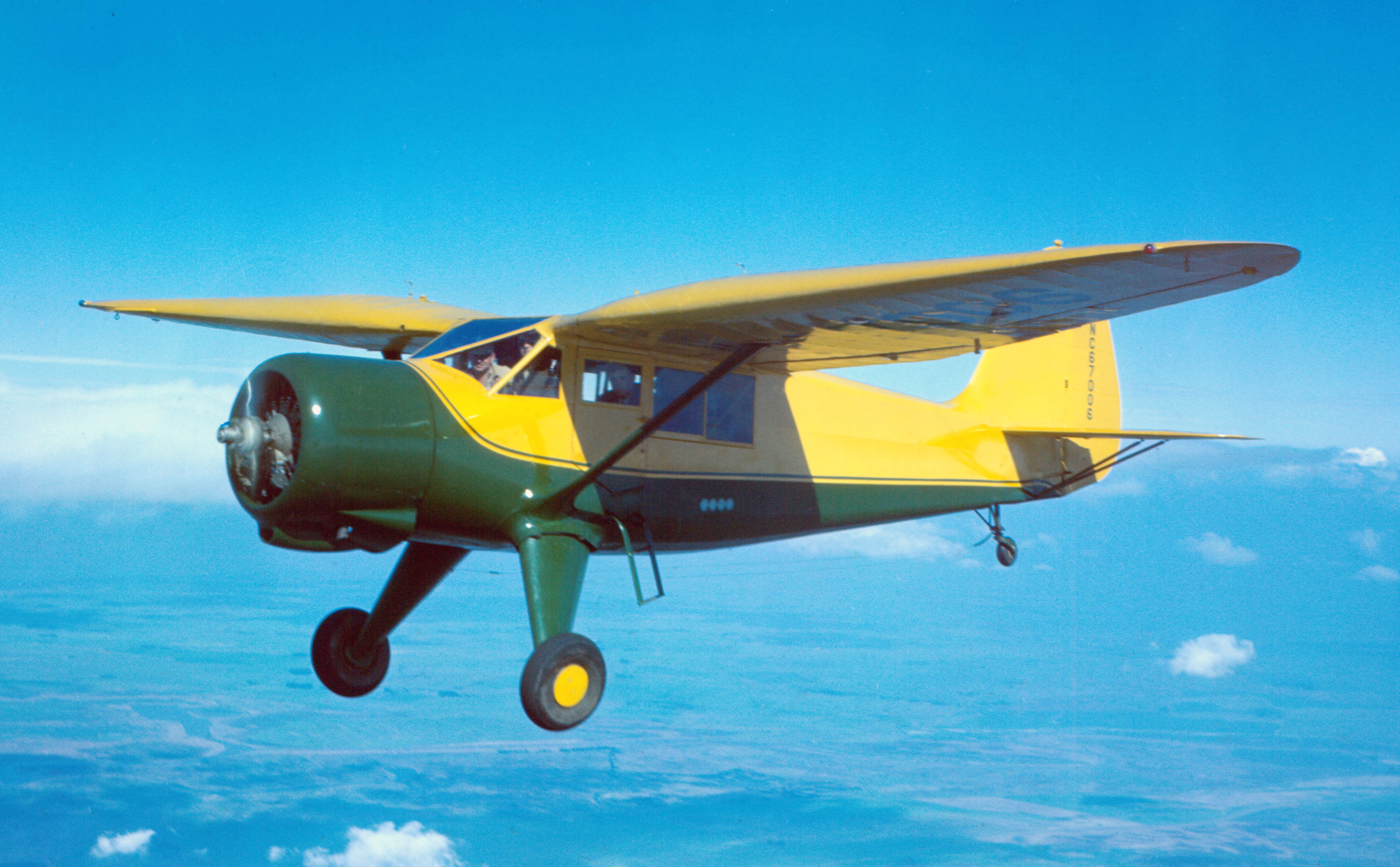

General information
- Type: Liaison and training monoplane
- National origin: United States
- Manufacturer: Stinson Aircraft Company
- Primary users: United States Army Air Corps Royal Navy
- Number built: 1,327

History
- First flight: 1933

The Stinson Reliant is a popular single-engine four- to five-seat high-wing monoplane manufactured by the Stinson Aircraft Division of the Aviation Manufacturing Corporation of Wayne, Michigan.

== Design and development ==
The Reliant is a high-wing, fixed-tailwheel land monoplane powered with a variety of radial engines.

1,327 Reliants of all types were made from 1933 to 1941, in different models, from SR-1 to SR-10. The final commercial model, the Stinson Reliant SR-10, was introduced in 1938. A militarized version was first flown in February 1942 and remained in production through several additional versions (all externally identical) until late 1943 for the US and British armed forces.

Reliant production can be broken into two distinct types – the straight-wing Reliants (all models up to SR-6) and the gull-wing Reliants (all models from SR-7 and after, including the militarized V-77/AT-19), with there being little in common between the two groups of types. The straight-wing Reliant has a wing of constant chord and thickness which is supported by two struts each side with additional bracing struts. In contrast the taper-wing Reliant has the broadest chord and thickness of the wing at mid-span, with the outer wing trailing edge heavily angled forward and a rounded cutout on the leading edge root, all supported by a single strut. The taper wing has a significant step up between the fuselage and the wing, and the changes in wing thickness gave it a distinct gull appearance from the front.

== Operational history ==
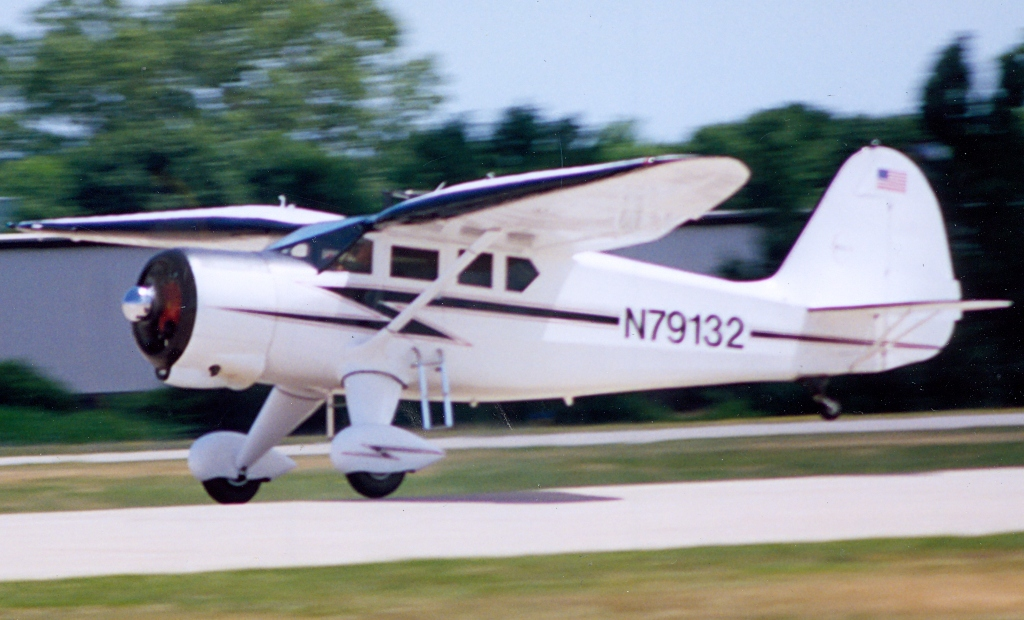
A Stinson (Vultee) V-77

The Reliant was used by the United States Army Air Forces in World War II as a utility aircraft, designated UC-81, and as trainer designated AT-19. The Royal Navy and Royal Air Force also used Reliants, for light transport and communication duties. After the war they were sold on the civilian market as the Vultee V-77.

The V-77 is a spartan version of the SR-10 with the 300 hp Lycoming R680-E3B, a single door on the left side and the traditional "bump" cowl was replaced with a simpler smooth cowl. Internal structure was beefed up significantly over the commercial models, and a distinctive triangle-shaped counterbalance was added to the rudder.

== Variants ==
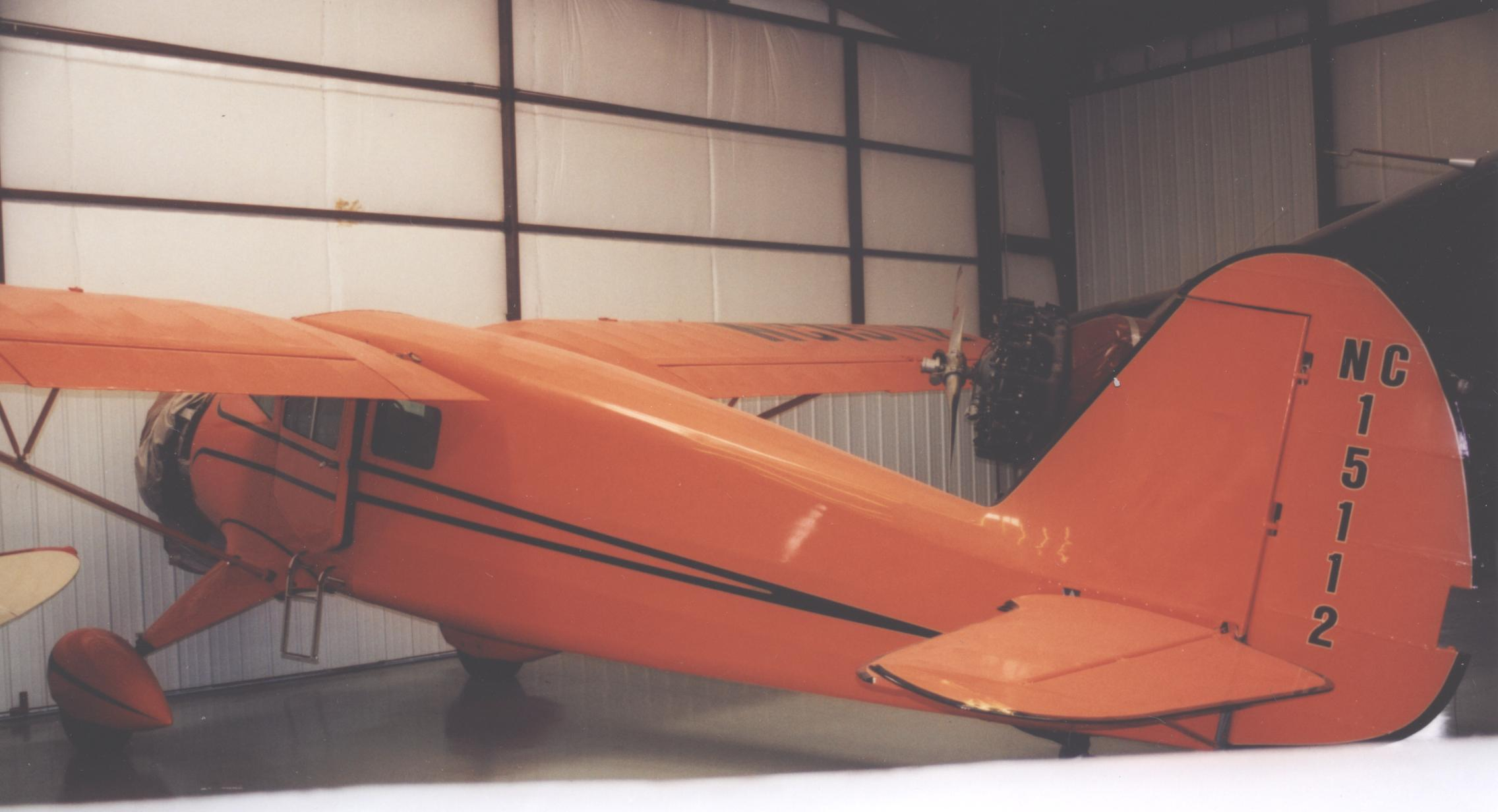
SR-6 Reliant at the Historic Aircraft Restoration Museum, Dauster Field, Missouri in 2006

All versions of the Reliant were powered with radial piston engines, and could be operated on wheels, floats and skis, and in the following configurations:

- Cargo
- Ambulance (two stretchers)
- Firefighting
- Photographic mapping

=== Civilian variants ===
- SR Reliant: Powered by a 215 hp (160 kW) Lycoming R-680.
- SR-1: Powered by a 240 hp (180 kW) Lycoming R-680-2. Two built.
- SR-2: Powered by a 240 hp (180 kW) Lycoming R-680-7.
- SR-3: Similar to the SR-1, but with retractable undercarriage.
- SR-4: Powered by a 250 hp (190 kW) Wright R-760-E.
- SR-5: Powered by a 225 hp (168 kW) Lycoming R-680-4.
- SR-5A: Powered by a 245 hp (183 kW) Lycoming R-680-6.
- SR-5B: Powered by a 240 hp (180 kW) Lycoming R-680-2.
- SR-5C: Powered by a 260 hp (190 kW) Lycoming R-680-5.
- SR-5E: Powered by a 225 hp (168 kW) Lycoming R-680-4.
- SR-5F: Powered by a 250 hp (190 kW) Wright R-760-E.
- SR-6: Four-seat cabin aircraft, powered by a Lycoming R-680-6.
- SR-6A: Four-seat cabin aircraft, powered by a 225 hp (168 kW) Lycoming R-680-4.
- SR-6B: Four-seat cabin aircraft, powered by a 260 hp (190 kW) Lycoming R-680-5.
- SR-7: First gull wing series.
- SR-7B: Four-seat cabin aircraft, powered by a Lycoming R-680-B6. 47 built.
- SR-7C: Four-seat cabin aircraft, powered by a Lycoming R-680-B5. Three built.
- SR-8A: Five-seat cabin aircraft.
- SR-8B: Five-seat cabin aircraft, powered by a Lycoming R-680-B6.
- SR-8C: Five-seat cabin aircraft, powered by a Lycoming R-680-B5.
- SR-8D: Five-seat cabin aircraft, powered by a Wright R-760-E2.
- SR-8DM: Utility transport version of the SR-8D.
- SR-8E: Five-seat cabin aircraft, powered by a 320 hp (240 kW) Wright R-760-E23.
- SR-8DE: Utility transport version of the SR-8E.
- SR-9: 1937 series. Fitted with a curved windshield, unique to this series.
- SR-9A: Proposed version with Lycoming R-680-B4 engine. Unbuilt.
- SR-9B: Powered by a 245 hp (183 kW) Lycoming R-680-B6 engine. 35 built.
- SR-9C: Powered by a 260 hp (190 kW) Lycoming R-680-B5 engine. 65 built.
- SR-9D: Powered by a 285 hp (213 kW) Wright R-760-E1 engine. 22 built.
- SR-9E: Powered by a 320 hp (240 kW) Wright R-760-E2 engine. 43 built.
- SR-9F: Powered by a 450 hp (340 kW) Pratt & Whitney Wasp Junior. 34 built.
- SR-10

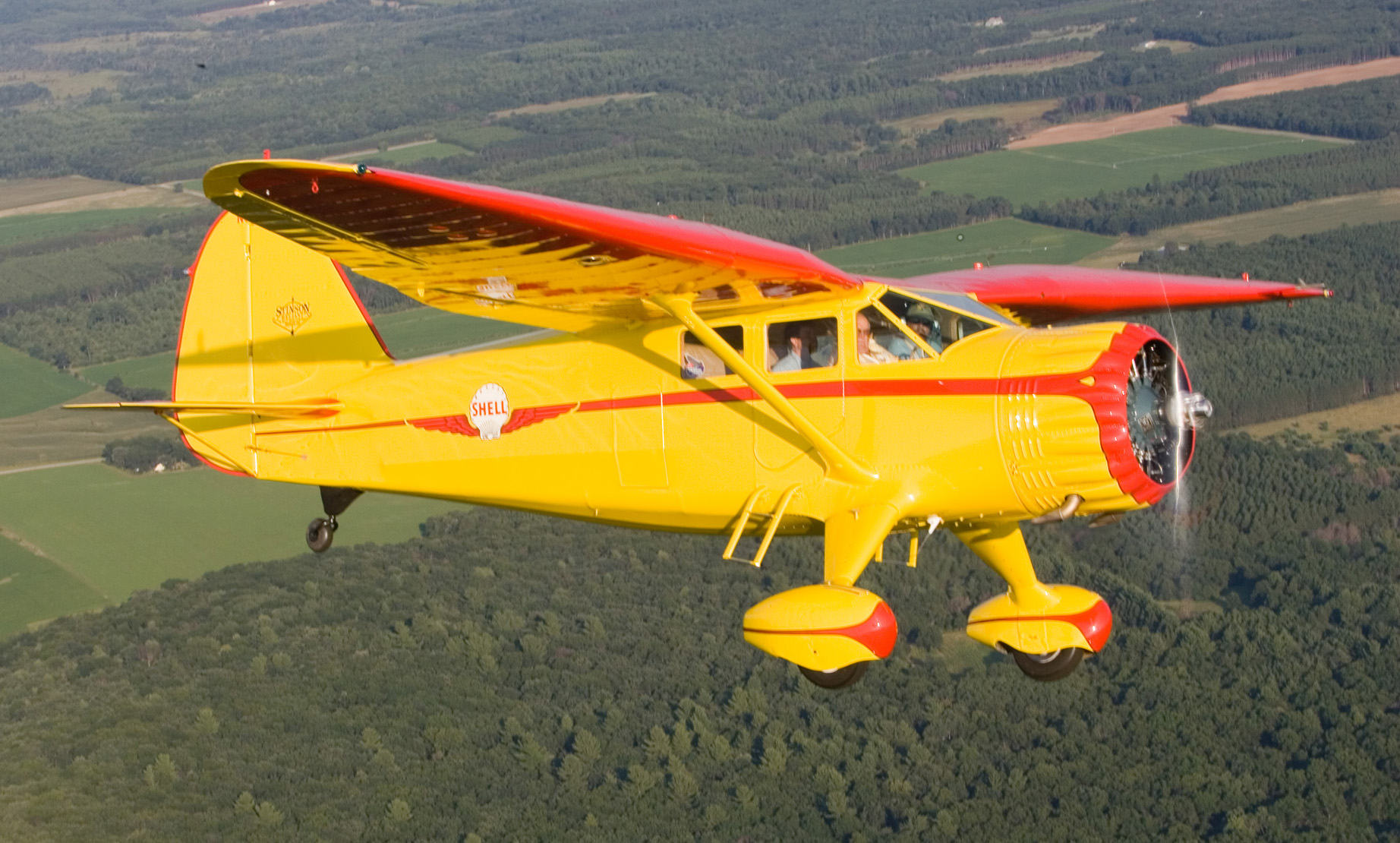
Jimmy Doolittle's Shell Stinson Reliant SR-10, restored

- SR-10B: Powered by a Lycoming R-680-D6. One built.
- SR-10C: Powered by a Lycoming R-680-D5 engine. 46 built.
- SR-10D: Wright R-760E-1 engine. 3 built.
- SR-10E: Powered by a Wright R-760E-2. 21 built.
- SR-10F: Powered by a Pratt & Whitney R-985 Wasp Junior SB. 18 built.
- SR-10G: Powered by a Lycoming R-680-E1. 12 built.
- SR-10J: Lycoming R-680-E3 engine. 11 built.
- SR-10K: Powered by a 450 hp (340 kW) Wright R-975E-3. 2 built for New York City Police Department; one with conventional landing gear, one seaplane with Edo floats.

=== Military variants ===
AT-19
USAAF designation for a training variant of the UC-81 for the Royal Navy under Lend-Lease as the Reliant I, 500 built.
AT-19A
Original designation of the L-9A which was a Voyager not a Reliant.

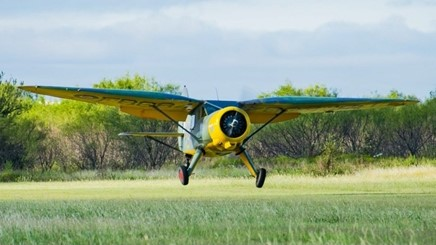
AT-19B of the Texas Air Museum in Slaton, Texas.

AT-19B
Original designation of the L-9B which was a Voyager not a Reliant.
AT-19C
Conversions of AT-19s for photo-survey aircraft for the USAAF, 51 conversions.
UC-81
Four impressed SR.8Bs.
UC-81A
Two impressed SR.10Gs.
UC-81B
One impressed SR.8E.
UC-81C
Three impressed SR.9Cs.
XC-81D
One civil SR.10F operated by the military for the development of glider pick-up techniques.
UC-81E
Four impressed SR.9Fs.
UC-81F
Seven impressed SR.10Fs.
UC-81G
Three impressed SR.9Ds.
UC-81H
One impressed SR.10E.
UC-81J
Nine impressed SR.9Es.
UC-81K
Five impressed SR.10Cs.
UC-81L
Two impressed SR.8Cs.
UC-81M
One impressed SR.9EM.
UC-81N
Two impressed SR.9Bs.
L-12
Two SR.5As impressed into service with the USAAF during World War II.
L-12A
Two SR.7Bs impressed into service during World War II.
RQ-1
One SR-5 Reliant was acquired by the US Coast Guard in 1935, later redesignated XR3Q-1 and decommissioned in 1941.
XR3Q-1
One SR-5 Reliant was acquired by the US Navy in 1935.
Reliant I
500 Reliants were supplied to the Royal Navy under Lend-Lease. The Reliants were used for light transport and communications, navigation and radio training duties.

== Operators ==
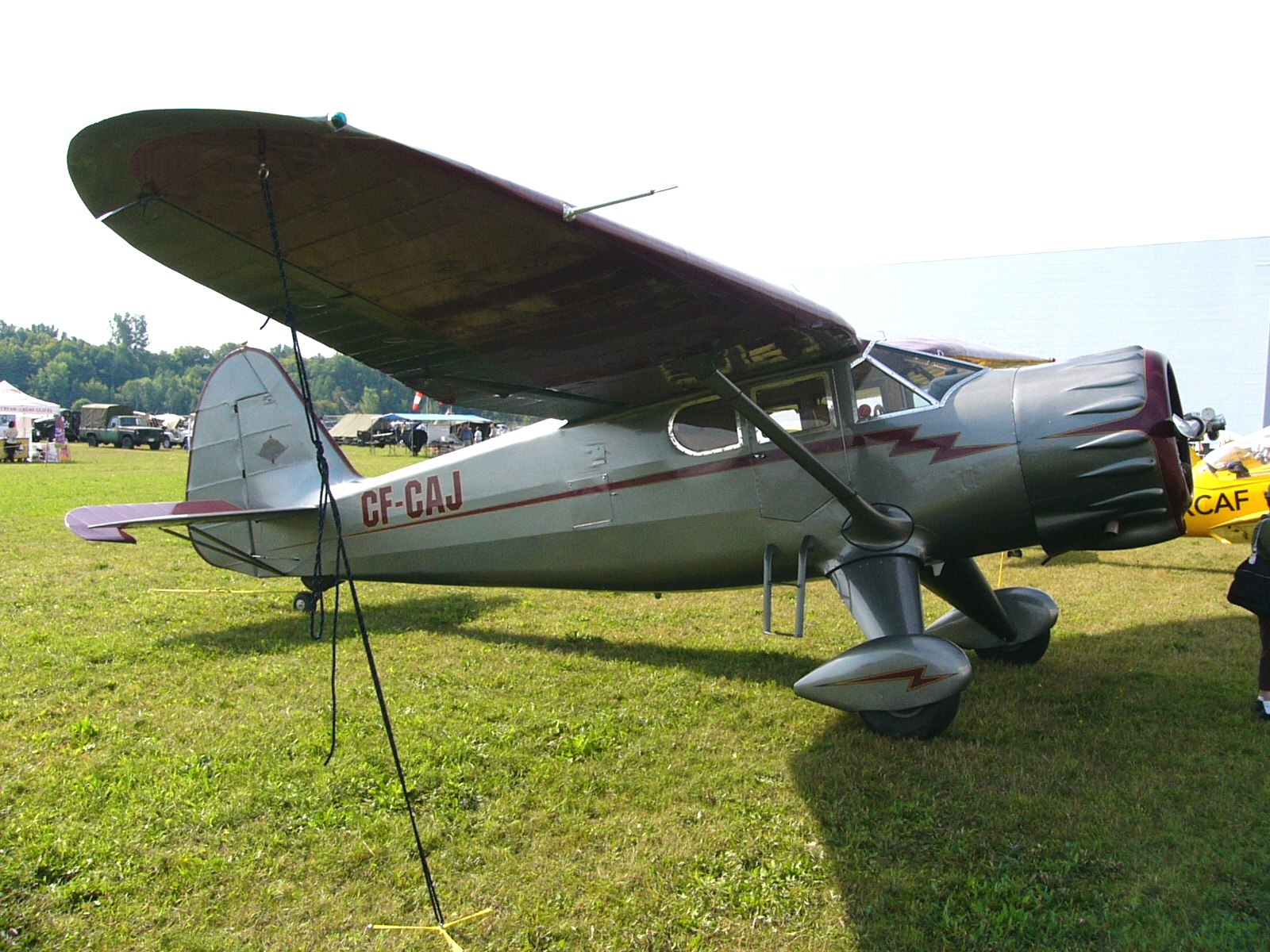
Stinson V77 Reliant

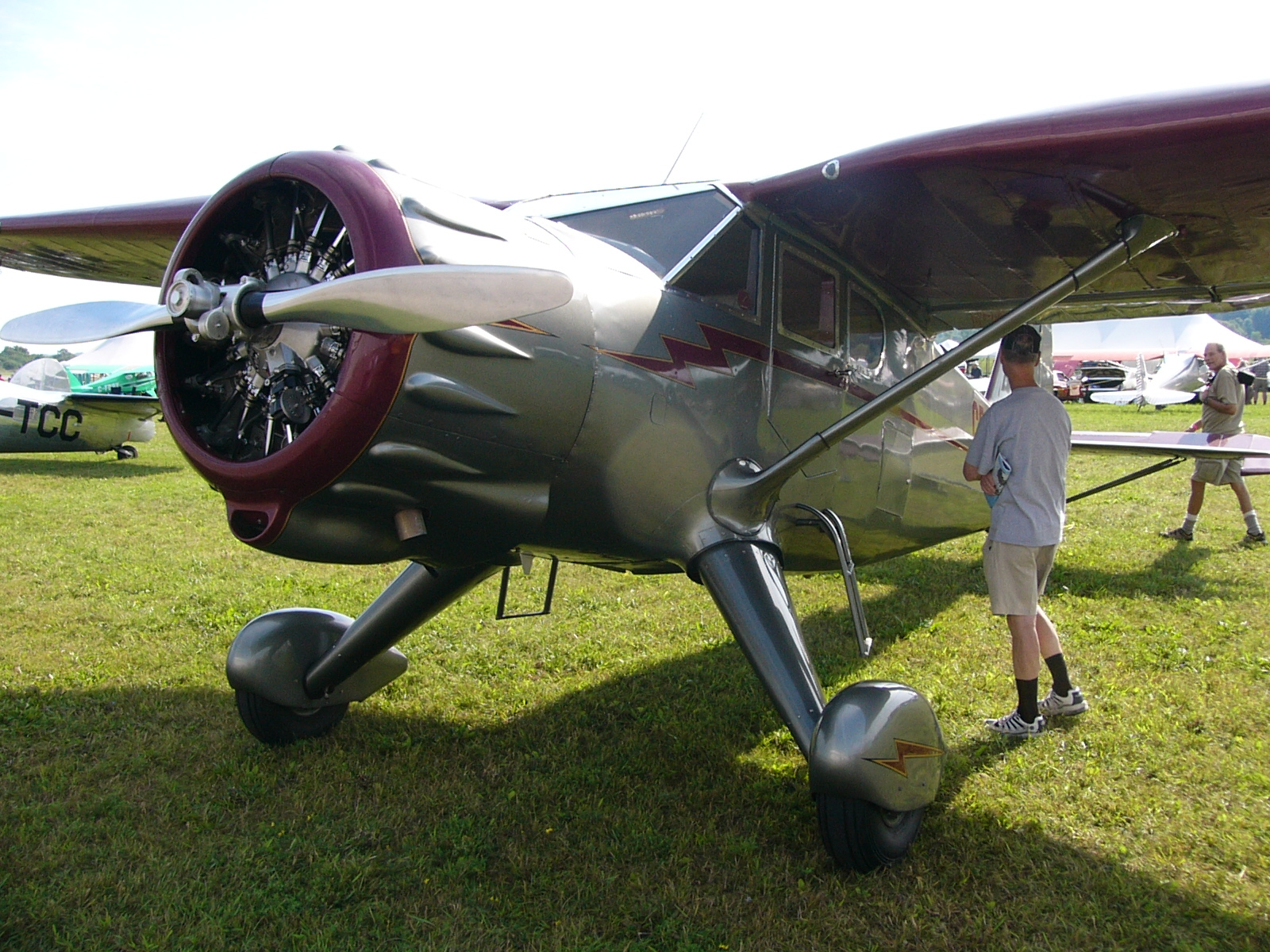
Stinson V77 Reliant

=== Military operators ===
Argentina

- Argentine Navy

Australia

- Royal Australian Air Force – 1

United Kingdom

- Royal Air Force
  - No. 510 Squadron RAF
- Fleet Air Arm
  - 730 Naval Air Squadron
  - 748 Naval Air Squadron

United States

- United States Army Air Forces – A total of 47 Reliants impressed during World War 2
- United States Coast Guard
- United States Navy

Uruguay

- Uruguayan Air Force

=== Civil operators ===
Brazil

- Aerolloyd Iguassu
- Aerovias Minas Gerais
- NAB – Navegação Aérea Brasileira

El Salvador

- Grupo TACA

Mexico

- Aeronaves de México – the Reliant was the first aircraft used by Aeronaves, later to become Mexico's largest airline, Aeromexico, on their initial service between Mexico and Acapulco on 14 September 1934

Norway

- Widerøe

Paraguay

- Líneas Aéreas de Transporte Nacional (LATN)

United States

- New York City Police Department Aviation Unit
- Northwest Airways

== Specifications (SR-10F) ==
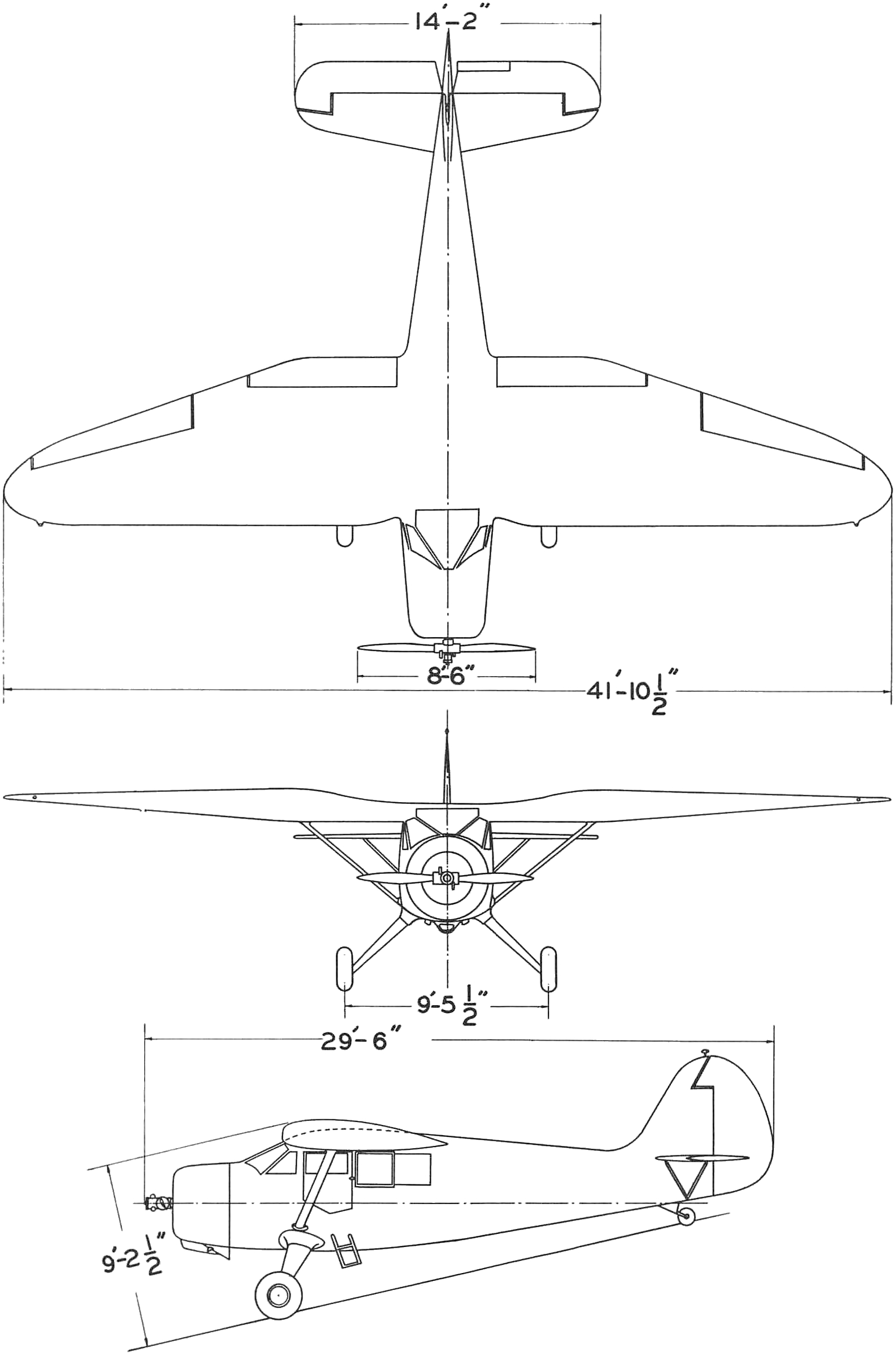
3-view line drawing of the Stinson AT-19 Reliant

Data from General Dynamics Aircraft and their Predecessors

General characteristics

- Crew: one, pilot
- Capacity: 3 to 4 passengers
- Length: 27 ft 11 in (8.51 m)
- Wingspan: 41 ft 7 in (12.68 m)
- Height: 8 ft 6 in (2.59 m)
- Wing area: 256.5 sq ft (23.84 m^{2})
- Empty weight: 3,045 lb (1,384 kg)
- Gross weight: 4,605 lb (2,093 kg)
- Powerplant: 1 × Pratt & Whitney Wasp Junior SB nine-cylinder air-cooled radial engine, 400 hp (298 kW)

Performance

- Cruise speed: 154 kn (177 mph, 285 km/h)
- Range: 739 nmi (850 mi, 1,369 km)
- Service ceiling: 21,000 ft (6,400 m)
- Rate of climb: 1,330 ft/min (6.8 m/s)

== See also ==
Aircraft of comparable role, configuration, and era

- Cessna Airmaster
- de Havilland Canada DHC-2 Beaver
- Fairchild 24
- Howard DGA-15
- Monocoupe 90
- Noorduyn Norseman
- Waco Standard Cabin series

Related lists

- List of aircraft of the Fleet Air Arm
- List of aircraft of the Royal Air Force
- List of aircraft of the United States during World War II
- List of aircraft of World War II
- List of military aircraft of the United States
- List of United States Navy aircraft designations (pre-1962)

== Bibliography ==
- Andrade, John (1979). U.S. Military Aircraft Designations and Serials since 1909. Midland Counties Publications. ISBN 0-904597-22-9.
- Elliot, Bryn (March–April 1997). "Bears in the Air: The US Air Police Perspective". Air Enthusiast. No. 68. pp. 46–51. ISSN 0143-5450.
- Halley, James J (1980). The Squadrons of the Royal Air Force. Tonbridge, Kent, UK: Air Britain (Historians). ISBN 0-85130-083-9.
- Pearcy, Arthur (1991). U.S. Coast Guard Aircraft Since 1916. Shrewsbury, UK: Airlife Publishing. ISBN 1-85310-118-4.
- Sapienza, Antonio Luis (June 2000). "Les premiers avions de transport commercial au Paraguay" [The First Commercial Transport Aircraft in Paraguay]. Avions: Toute l'Aéronautique et son histoire (in French) (87): 45–47. ISSN 1243-8650.
- "Stinson Restyles". Aviation Week & Space Technology. Vol. 36, no. 2. February 1937. pp. 35–36.
- Swanborough, F. G.; Bowers, Peter M. (1963). United States Military Aircraft since 1909. London: Putnam.
- Swanborough, Gordon; Bowers, Peter M. (1976). United States Navy Aircraft since 1911 (Second ed.). London: Putnam. ISBN 0-370-10054-9.
- Wegg, John (1990). General Dynamics Aircraft and their Predecessors. London: Putnam. ISBN 0-85177-833-X.
