= Breda Ba.79S =

79S
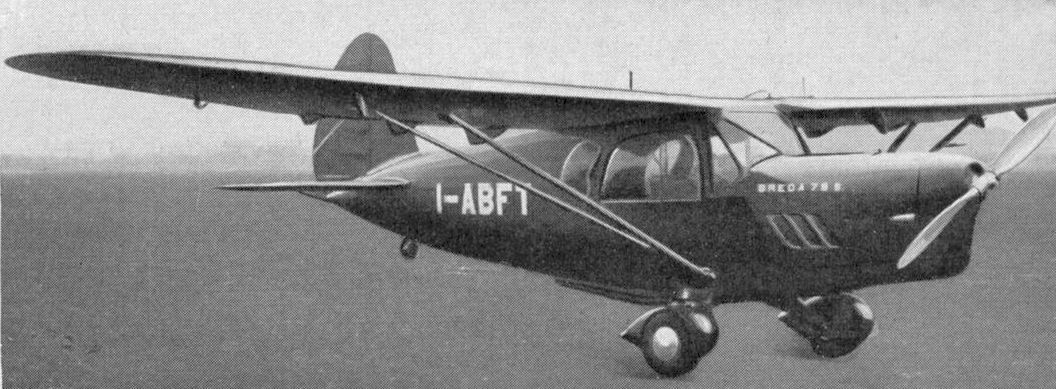

General information
- Type: private light aircraft
- National origin: Italy
- Manufacturer: Società Italiana Ernesto Breda
- Number built: 3?

History
- First flight: c.1937

The Breda Ba.79S was a single-engine four-seat high-wing private aircraft built in Italy in the late 1930s. Only a few were produced.

== Design and development ==
The Breda 79S was unusual amongst the Società Italiana Ernesto Breda's products in the late 1930s in that it was a civil machine rather than a military one. It was a single-engined high-wing monoplane with a rather well equipped cabin for four. The wings were joined to the upper fuselage longeron and braced with streamlined vee struts to the lower longeron in the conventional way. They had almost straight leading edges with taper on the trailing edges and rounded tips. Trailing edge flaps and leading edge slots were interconnected. The tailplane was mounted at mid-fuselage height and was braced to the rounded fin, which carried a wide chord and unbalanced rudder. These tail surfaces were fabric over wooden frames.

The aircraft was powered by a 200 hp (149 kW) Alfa-Romeo 115 six-cylinder inverted inline engine, neatly cowled but giving the Breda 79 a long-nosed look. The engine drove a two-bladed propeller. The fuselage was a fabric-covered welded steel structure, faired to an oval cross section. Behind the engine and under the wings was the cabin with four seats in two rows of two. Glazing was generous, including an openable roof window, and the cabin was both thermally and acoustically insulated with controllable ventilation. The seats were deep enough to allow everyone to wear a parachute backpack and in an emergency the pilot could open both the wide side doors and the roof light with a single lever. The pilot's position was instrumented, and the aircraft lit, for night flying. The divided undercarriage had widely splayed legs attached at the bottom of the wing bracing struts, carrying semi-spatted wheels (closely streamlined but with the outer side of the wheel visible).

The first Breda 79, c/n 78001 was registered as I-ABFU on 20 April 1936 together with a second example, I-ABFT c/n 78002 but it is not known when they first flew. Records are sketchy, but three seem to have been flown and used by the Ministero Aeronautica.

== Specifications ==
Data from Grey 1972, p. 173c

General characteristics

- Crew: 1
- Capacity: 3 passengers
- Length: 7.6 m (24 ft 11 in)
- Wingspan: 11.61 m (38 ft 1 in)
- Height: 1.97 m (6 ft 5.5 in)
- Wing area: 18 m^{2} (194 sq ft)
- Empty weight: 770 kg (1,698 lb)
- Gross weight: 1,220 kg (2,687 lb)
- Powerplant: 1 × Alfa-Romeo 115 6-cylinder air-cooled inverted inline , 149 kW (200 hp)

Performance

- Maximum speed: 250 km/h (155 mph, 135 kn)
- Cruise speed: 200 km/h (137 mph, 119 kn)
- Stall speed: 74 km/h (46 mph, 40 kn)
- Range: 850 km (528 mi, 459 nmi)
- Rate of climb: 5.55 m/s (1,093 ft/min) to 1,000 m
