= Nardi FN.310 =

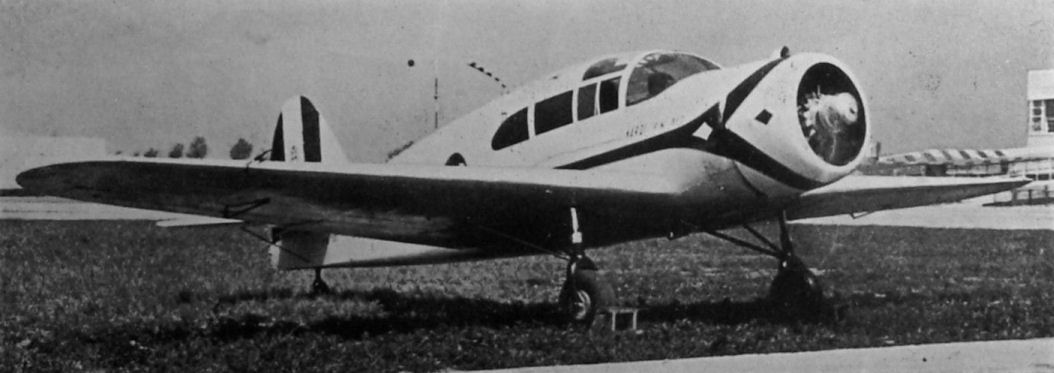

General information
- Type: Four-seat touring monoplane
- National origin: Italy
- Manufacturer: Fratelli Nardi

History
- First flight: 1936
- Developed from: Nardi FN.305

The Nardi FN.310 was an Italian four-seat touring monoplane similar but larger than the earlier Nardi FN.305 and produced by the Fratelli Nardi company.

== Development ==
First flown in 1936 the FN.310 was a four-seat touring monoplane powered by a single 200 hp (149 kW) Fiat A.70S radial engine. It had two pairs of side-by-side seats although an ambulance variant had room for stretcher instead of the rear seats.

== Specifications (FN.310) ==
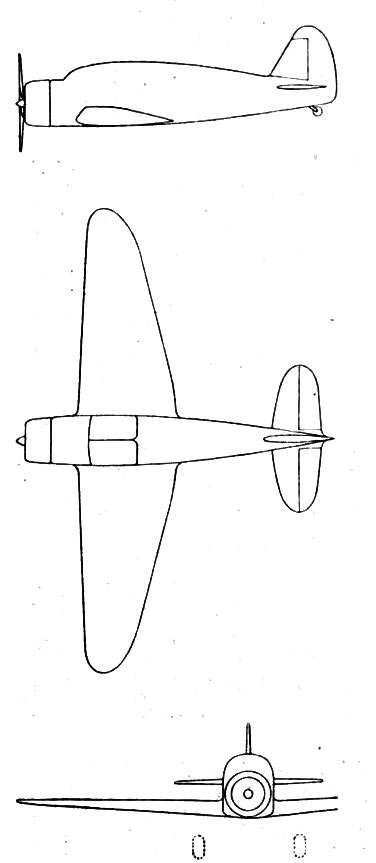
Nardi FN.310 3-view drawing from L'Aerophile July 1939

Data from Les Ailes 19 February 1939

General characteristics

- Crew: One
- Capacity: Three passengers
- Wingspan: 10 m (32 ft 10 in)
- Height: 2.20 m (7 ft 3 in)
- Wing area: 16 m^{2} (170 sq ft)
- Empty weight: 650 kg (1,433 lb)
- Gross weight: 1,150 kg (2,535 lb)
- Powerplant: 1 × Fiat A.70S 7-cylinder radial, 130 kW (180 hp)
- Propellers: 2-bladed , constant speed

Performance

- Maximum speed: 300 km/h (190 mph, 160 kn) at ground level
- Minimum control speed: 90 km/h (56 mph, 49 kn)
- Range: 1,400 km (870 mi, 760 nmi)
- Service ceiling: 6,000 m (20,000 ft)
- Time to altitude: 30 min to 5,000 m (16,000 ft)
- Take-off distance: 210 m (690 ft)
- Landing distance: 250 m (820 ft)
