= Fiat G.46 =

Italian military trainer aircraft family

G.46
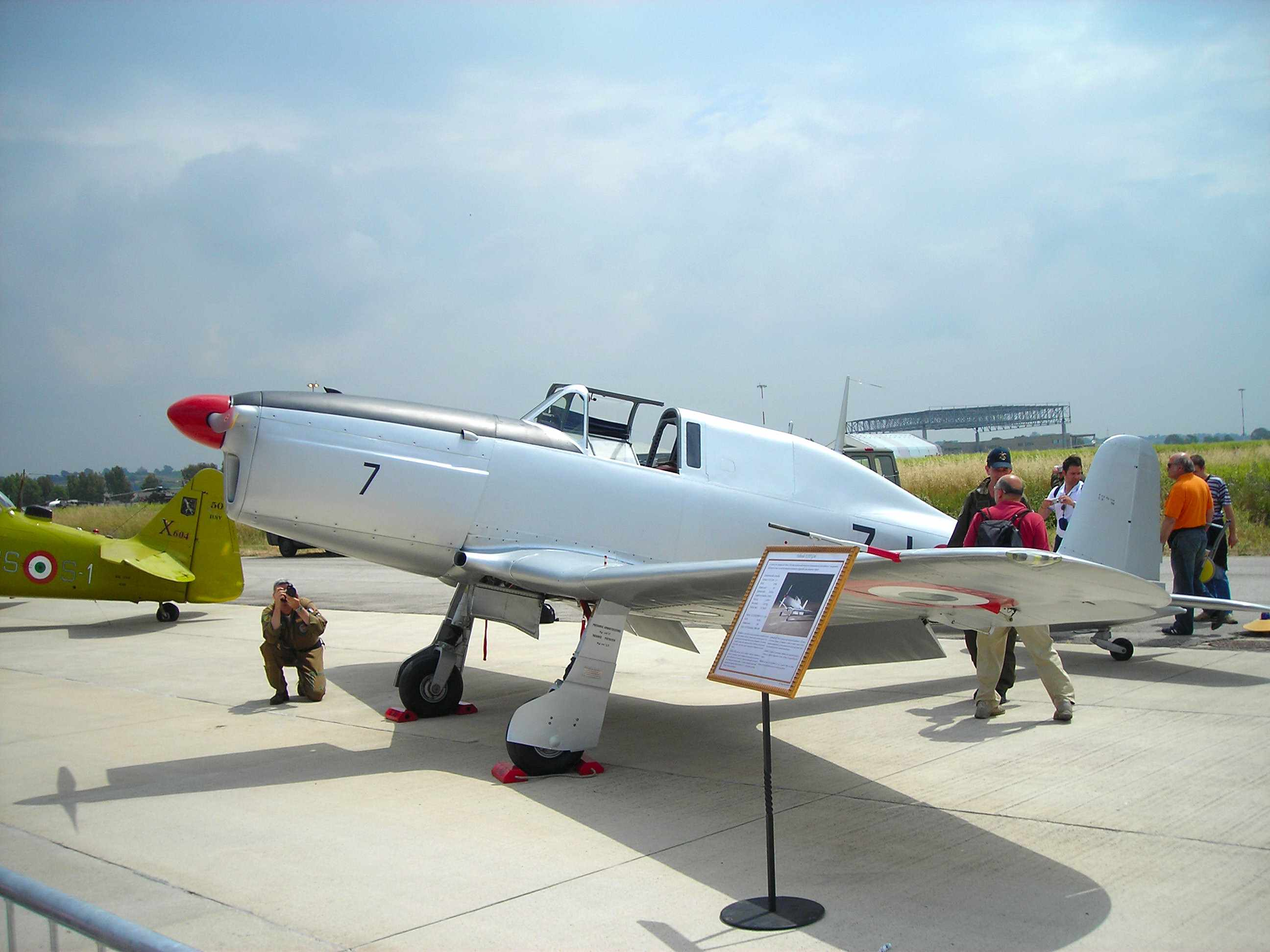

General information
- Type: Military trainer
- Manufacturer: Fiat
- Designer: Giuseppe Gabrielli
- Primary user: Aeronautica Militare
- Number built: 223

History
- First flight: 25 June 1947

The Fiat G.46 was a military trainer developed in Italy shortly after World War II.

== Design and development ==
The G.46 was a conventional, low-wing monoplane with tailwheel undercarriage, the main units of which retracted inwards. The pilot and instructor sat in tandem under a long canopy. The first prototype, powered by a 205 hp (153 kW) Alfa Romeo 115-Ibis engine, made its maiden flight on 25 June 1947.

Testing revealed excellent flying characteristics and suitability for aerobatics, and the type was ordered into production.

Apart from the 150 ordered by the Aeronautica Militare, 70 aircraft were exported, to Austria, Argentina and Syria.

== Variants ==
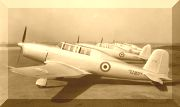

G.46-1B
two-seater with Alfa Romeo 115bis engine, one prototype and initial production of 25 for the Italian Air Force.
G.46-2B
two-seater with de Havilland Gipsy Queen engine for the Argentine Air Force, 70 built with an additional 12 for the Syrian Air Force.
G.46-3B
two-seater with Alfa Romeo 115ter engine for the Italian Air Force, 25 built.
G.46-4B
two-seater with Alfa Romeo 115ter engine for the Italian Air Force, 55 built.
G.46-5B
two-seat navigation trainer (prototype only)
G.46-4A
single-seater with Alfa Romeo 115ter engine for the Italian Air Force, 35 built.

== Operators ==
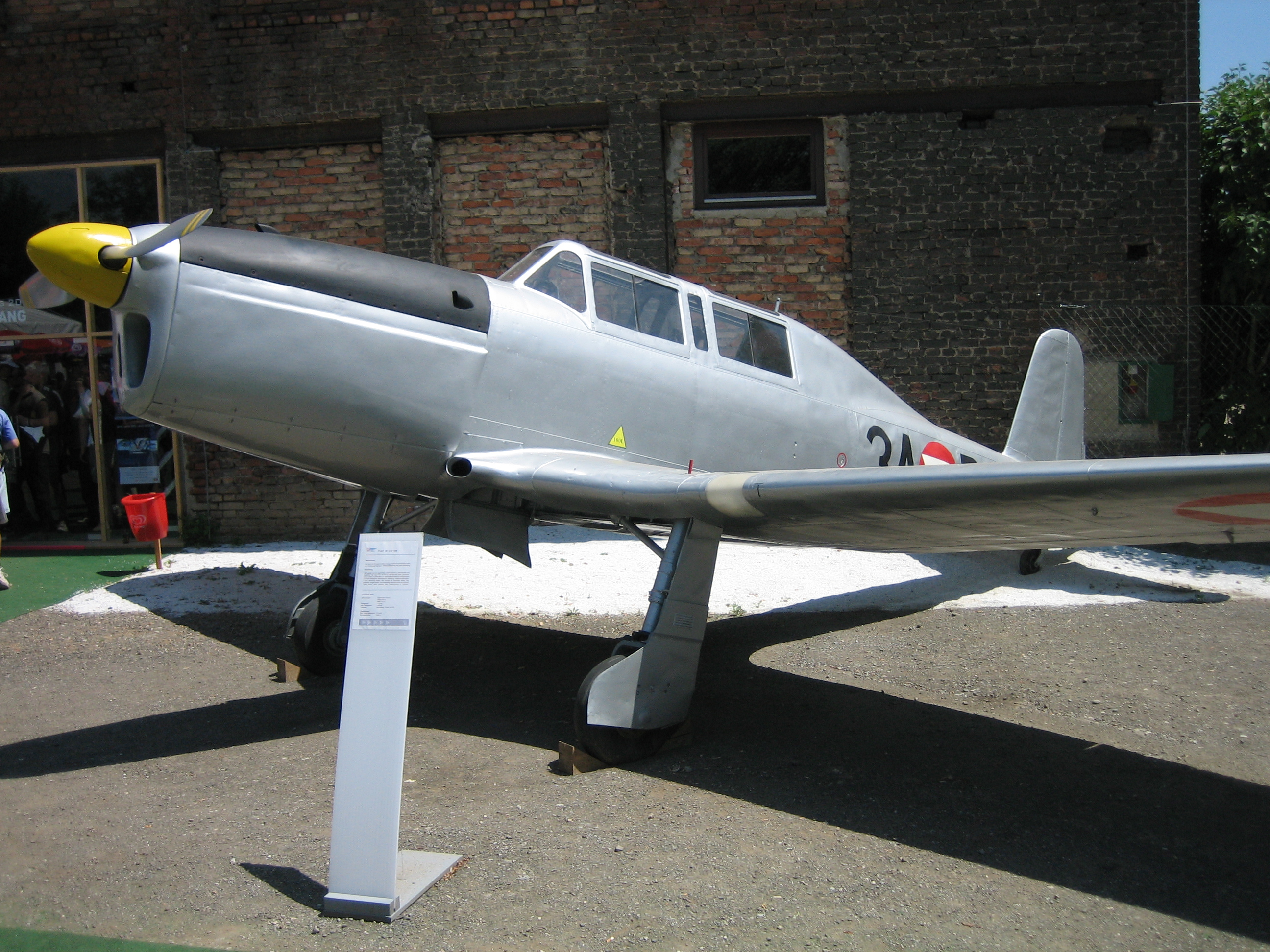
Austrian Fiat G.46

Argentina

- Argentine Air Force operated 70 Fiat G.46

Austria

- Austrian Air Force operated five former Italian Air Force G-46Bs.

Italy

- Italian Air Force operated 141 Fiat G.46 from 1949 until 1960

Syria

- Syrian Air Force operated 12 G.46-2B aircraft.

== Surviving aircraft ==
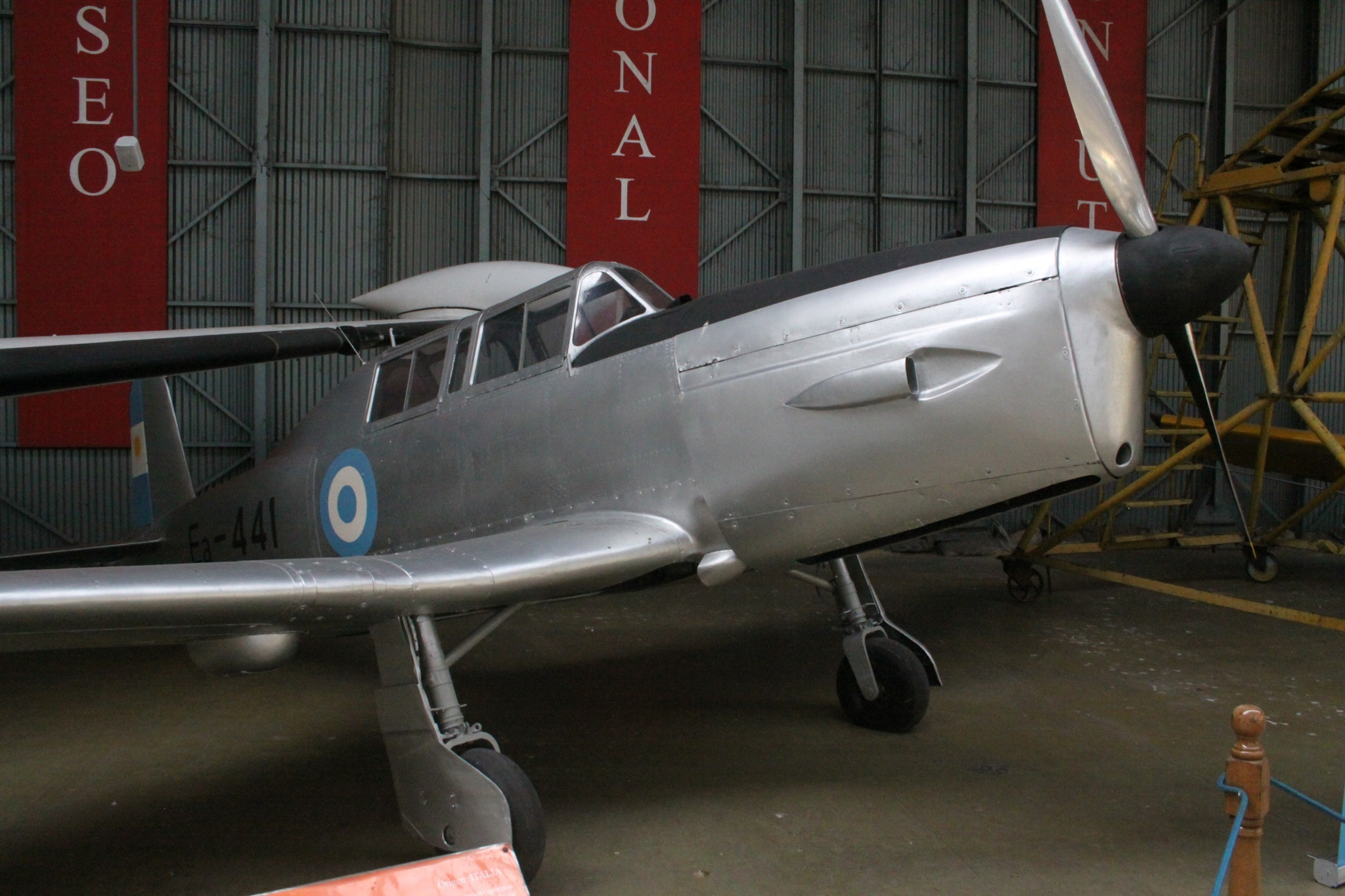
Ex-Argentine Air Force, Museo Nacional de Aeronautica, 2012

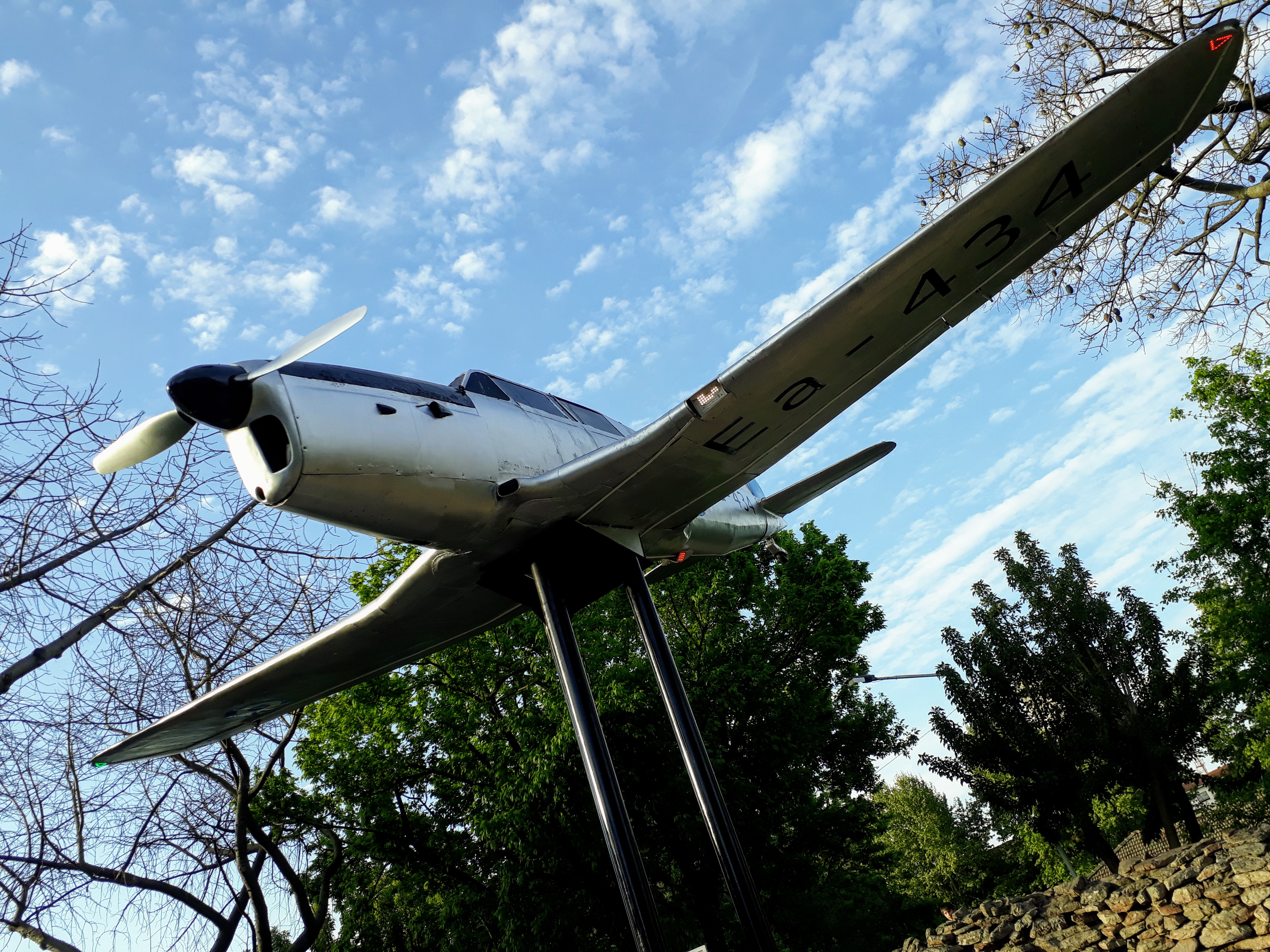
Ex-Argentine Air Force, in Ciudad Jardin Lomas del Palomar

- An ex-Argentine Air Force aircraft is displayed at the Museo Nacional de Aeronautica de Argentina.
- An ex-Argentine Air Force aircraft is displayed at the Plaza de los Aviadores (Aviators Square) in Ciudad Jardin Lomas del Palomar, Buenos Aires.
- A flightworthy G-46-3B which has been converted to a single-seat aircraft is on display at the Frasca Air Museum in Champaign, Illinois. The aircraft was originally in the service of the Italian air force.
- A G-46-3B is currently on display and undergoing restoration to airworthy at the Military Aviation Museum in Virginia Beach, Virginia.

== Specifications (G.46-4B) ==
Data from Jane's All The World's Aircraft 1953–54

General characteristics

- Crew: 2
- Length: 8.48 m (27 ft 10 in)
- Wingspan: 10.40 m (34 ft 1 in)
- Height: 2.40 m (7 ft 10 in)
- Wing area: 16.0 m^{2} (172 sq ft)
- Empty weight: 1,110 kg (2,447 lb)
- Gross weight: 1,410 kg (3,109 lb)
- Fuel capacity: 160 L (42 US gal; 35 imp gal)
- Powerplant: 1 × Alfa Romeo 115-1ter air-cooled 6-cylinder inline engine, 168 kW (225 hp)

Performance

- Maximum speed: 311 km/h (193 mph, 168 kn)
- Cruise speed: 263 km/h (163 mph, 142 kn) (80% power)
- Range: 900 km (560 mi, 490 nmi)
- Service ceiling: 5,300 m (17,400 ft)
- Rate of climb: 1.8 m/s (350 ft/min)
- Time to altitude:
  - 7 min 23 s to 2,000 m (6,600 ft)
  - 20 min 7 s to 4,000 m (13,000 ft)
