= Fiat A.70 =

1930s Italian piston aircraft engine

A.70
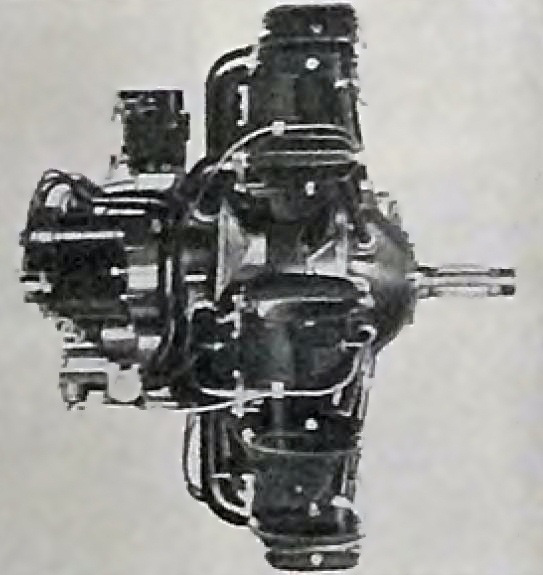
- Fiat A.70
- Type: Air cooled 7-cylinder radial aircraft engine
- National origin: Italy
- Manufacturer: Fiat Aviazione
- Designer: Tranquillo Zerbi
- First run: 1934

The Fiat A.70 was an air cooled radial engine with seven cylinders developed by the Italian engineering company Fiat Aviazione in the 1930s. The engine powered a number of Italian light competition and prototype aircraft.

== Design and development ==
The A.70 was developed by Fiat Aviazione, part of Fiat S.p.A., as one of a number of related small radial engines. It debuted at the Challenge International de Tourisme 1934, powering a number of the competitors. The engine had seven cylinders of square design, with a bore and stroke of 115 mm (4.5 in), arranged around a crankshaft in a single row. It was connected to the propeller by direct drive, often through a NACA cowling.

== Applications ==
- Breda Ba.42
- Caproni PS.1
- Fiat G.5
- Nardi FN.305
- Nardi FN.310

== Specifications (A.70S) ==
Data from NACA Technical Memorandum No.760.

=== General characteristics ===
- Type: 7-cylinder, single row, air cooled radial engine
- Bore: 115 mm (4.5 in)
- Stroke: 115 mm (4.5 in)
- Displacement: 9.35 L (571 in^{3})
- Dry weight: 168 kg (370 lb)

=== Components ===
- Valvetrain: Two valves per cylinder
- Fuel type: Gasoline
- Cooling system: Air-cooled
- Reduction gear: Direct drive

=== Performance ===
- Power output: 200 hp (149 kW) at 2,300 rpm (max); 180 hp (134 kW) at 2,100 rpm (rated)
- Compression ratio: 5.8:1
- Power-to-weight ratio: 0.81 kg (1.8 lb) per hp

== See also ==
Comparable engines

- Armstrong Siddeley Lynx
- Siemens-Halske Sh 14
- Warner Super Scarab

Related lists

- List of aircraft engines
