= Fiat A.60 =

1930s Italian piston aircraft engine

A.60
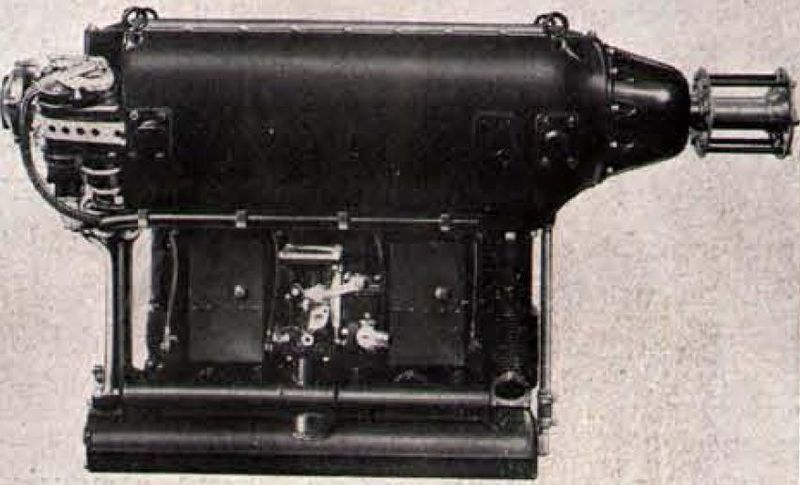
- Side view of A.60 140 hp version
- Type: Piston engine
- National origin: Italy
- Manufacturer: Fiat
- First run: 1932

The Fiat A.60 was a four-cylinder, air-cooled inline engine developed in Italy in the 1930s.

== Design ==
The A.60 had a valve control mechanism and the distribution shaft seal, which had a special cover ensuring uniform cooling of the cylinders. In addition to the basic A.60, an A.60-R version was developed which featured a front reduction unit, self-centered, and an output of 145 hp at 2,500 rpm, or 1,580 rpm per minute for the propeller.

== Variants ==
A.60
Standard version with direct drive, 135 hp (100.7 kW)
A.60 R.

Geared version : output 145 hp (108.1 kW) at 2,500 engine rpm driving a 0.632:1 reduction gear.

== Applications ==
- Fiat G.2
- Fiat G.5
- Caproni Ca.100

== Specifications ==
Data from

=== General characteristics ===
- Type: 4-cylinder air-cooled inline
- Bore: 120 mm (4.72 inches)
- Stroke: 145 mm (5.71 inches)
- Displacement: 6.560 L
- Dry weight: 135 kg (298 kg)

=== Components ===
- Cooling system: Air-cooled

=== Performance ===
- Power output: 135 hp (101 kW)
- Compression ratio: 5.75:1
- Power-to-weight ratio: 225 g/cv/h

== See also ==
Related lists

- List of aircraft engines
