= Chás Leão =

Brazilian brand of herbal tea drinks

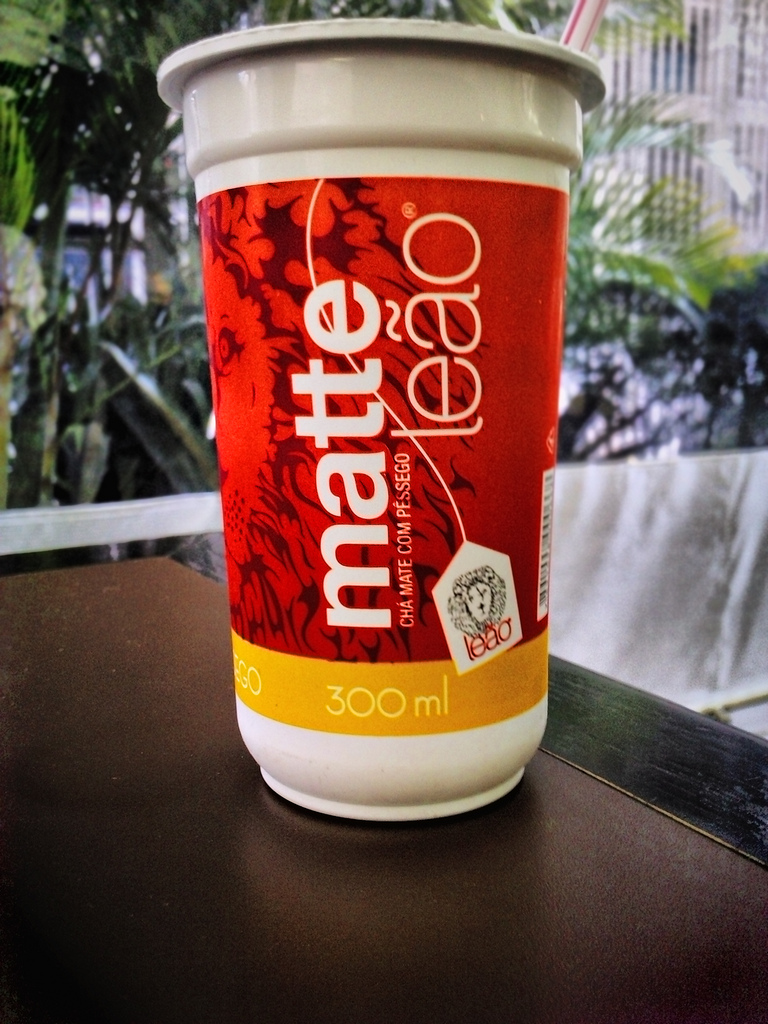
300ml cup of Matte Leão

Chás Leão (English: "Lion Teas") is a Brazilian infusion and tea brand, currently owned by The Coca-Cola Company. The spelling Matte is archaic, but preserved in the trademark; the currently correct Portuguese spelling for the herb and the derived beverage is mate. Matte Leão offers a range of over 100 types of infusions.

== History ==
The Guarani people were the first to use leaves and stems of Ilex paraguariensis, or yerba mate, which was native to southern Brazil. After the 17th century, the herb began to be popularly marketed. On May 8, 1901, in Paraná, along with natural herbal, Agostinho Ermelino de Leão Júnior founded St. Augustine Factory. At first, Leão Júnior was exported in the form of mate to Argentina, Uruguay and Chile. When Leão Júnior died in 1908, his wife, Maria Clara took over the business. A fire destroyed the factory in 1912 and the company moved to Curitiba. After a recovery period, the company's exports reached up to 5,000 tons per year in the early 1920s.

In 1926, when the Leão concluded the construction of facilities with a railway extension, a path to an enormous business growth resulted in the dispose of its own production to the port of Paranaguá, which was exported to Montevideo and Buenos Aires. Another fire in 1930 burned the new plant, which had its own generation of electricity, rail terminal and a standalone village-house for workers. Being innovative also in image processing, during 1930s Leo Junior & Co. prepares the first film to promote their products pushing them into the market. During these first three decades, the company diversified its business lines, venturing into the sectors of timber, coffee, wheat milling, livestock, mining, waterways, safe, and air transportation along with the creation of Aerolloyd Iguassu.

At the end of this decade, in 1938, the company realized the habit of people to add an iced infusion to drink, to consume it toasted, launched in the Brazilian infusion Matte Leão toast. Its introduction was as innovative as the product: at night, a lighted boat ran the beaches of Rio de Janeiro Botafogo in announcing the product with the slogan Já vem queimado use e abuse 'Already burned, use and abuse'. The company then focused its business to mate only. In 1950, in the scorching heat of the beaches of Rio de Janeiro, the most popular drink was a home-made iced infusion, sold by street vendors in drums on the beach. Noting this trend, the brand launched the Matte Leão iced infusion, the first ready-to-drink mate.

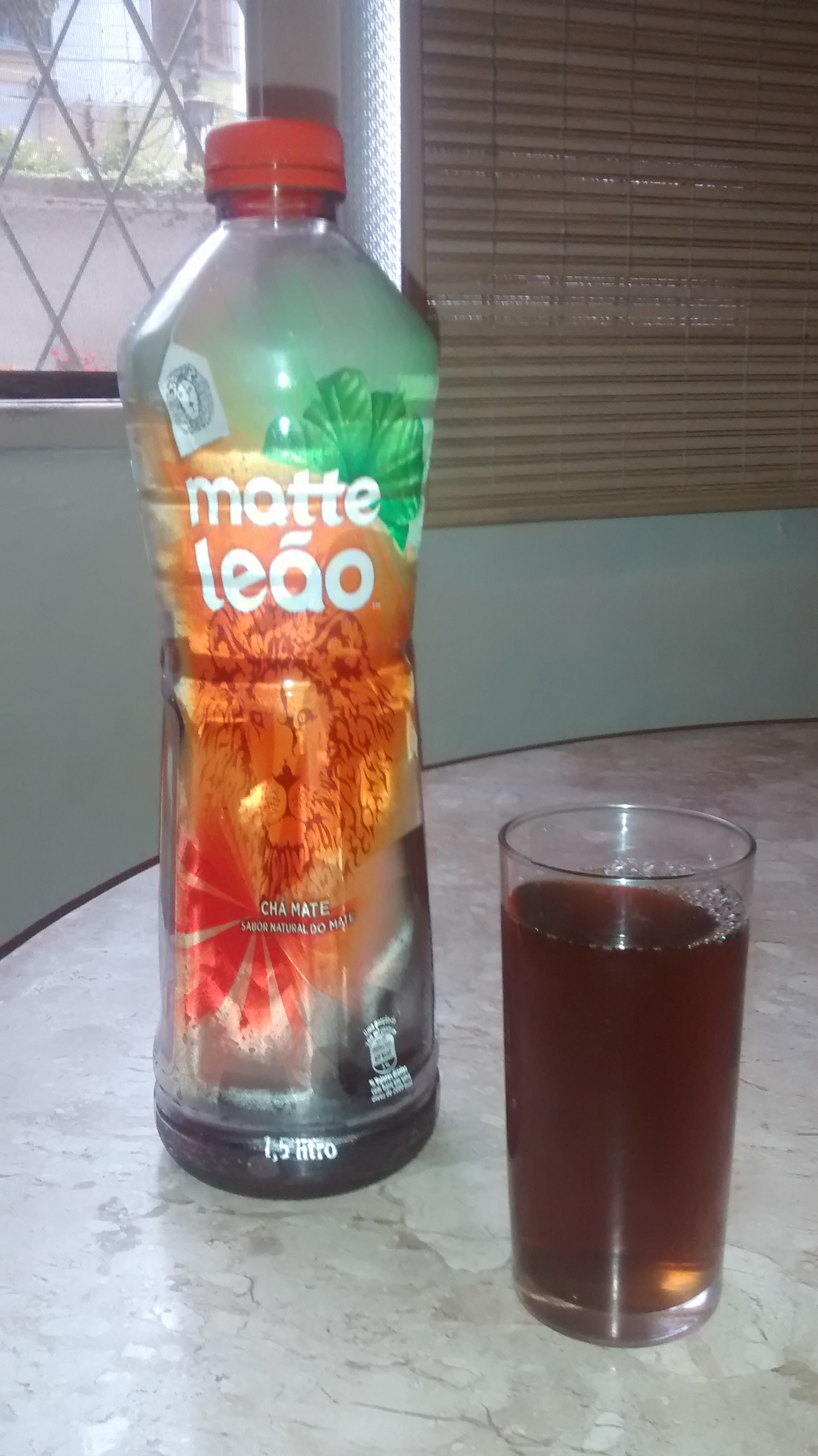
A bottle of Matte Leão sold as an iced tea.

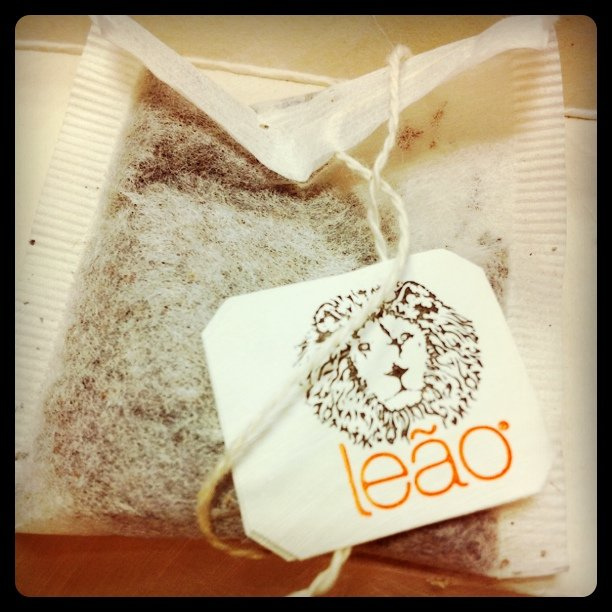
A bag of Matte Leão

Until 1969, the company completed its routine product release; powder with Matte Leão concentrated in a bottle, followed by creating the matte bag in 1973, which was initially featured as natural lemon and toasted mate flavors - instantly soluble by adding hot water or ice. In 1983, again anticipating the trends in consumption of natural herbal infusions launched, starting with the Chamomile, Lemon Grass, Grass Candy (produced by the selection of the fruits of the plant, guaranteeing the aniseed-flavor and taste particularly sweet infusion), Boldo and Mint flavors. In the summer of 1987, the launch of ready-to-drink infusion in cups of 300ml, initially focusing its sales targeting the beaches of Rio, saw its sales soar.

The production of multivariate dimensional packages for the iced infusion, namely 330ml, 500ml, 1.5 liters and the 300ml cups, took place in 2002, with a new factory opening in Rio de Janeiro. In 2004, Leão invested in functional infusions introducing a new line of infusions with mixed combinations of flavors and properties matching with various tailor-made herbs which had specific customer needs like "Boa Noite" (Good Night), with aroma and mild flavor being ideal for relaxation; "Silvestre", is the combination of aromas of strawberry, raspberry and black currant; "Orchard", a mixture of soft aromas of peach, apple, cherry and orange; and "Tropical", a delicate combination of flavors containing fruits like mango, pineapple, apple and banana. The expansion of this line brought innovations such as many choices of flavors: mate with lemon, peach, guaraná flavors.

In 2006, the company launched in Brazil the zero-calories Green Tea, product which is ready to drink. Flavors available in the dry line include: flavored green teas, black tea with cinnamon, and Winter Line with Mate Leão chocolate and caramel flavor. The success drew attention to The Coca-Cola Company, which bought the company in early 2007. In the same year the company introduced the Green Tea Spree, first green tea with lemon low calorie ready to drink lightly carbonated beverage in Brazil. The latest new brand, introduced in 2009, was the Lion Concentrate Matte with a home-made taste and made for those who have the habit of drinking mate at all times.
