= Fiat G.5 =

Italian two-seat aerobatic tourer or trainer

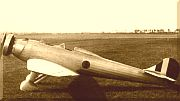

General information
- Type: Two-seat aerobatic tourer or trainer
- National origin: Italy
- Manufacturer: Fiat

History
- First flight: 1933

The Fiat G.5 was an Italian two-seat aerobatic tourer or trainer designed and built by Fiat Aviazione in small numbers.

== Development ==
Designed originally as a two-seat light aerobatic trainer the G.5 was a low-wing cantilever monoplane powered by a 135 hp (101 kW) Fiat A.70 radial piston engine. It had fixed tailwheel landing gear and tandem open cockpits for the instructor and pupil.

The type was built in small numbers and was followed by a prototype G.5/2 with an inverted inline 140 hp (104 kW) Fiat A.60. A small number was also built of the final variant G.5bis which was fitted with a higher output 200 hp (149 kW) Fiat A.70 engine.

== Later history and operations ==
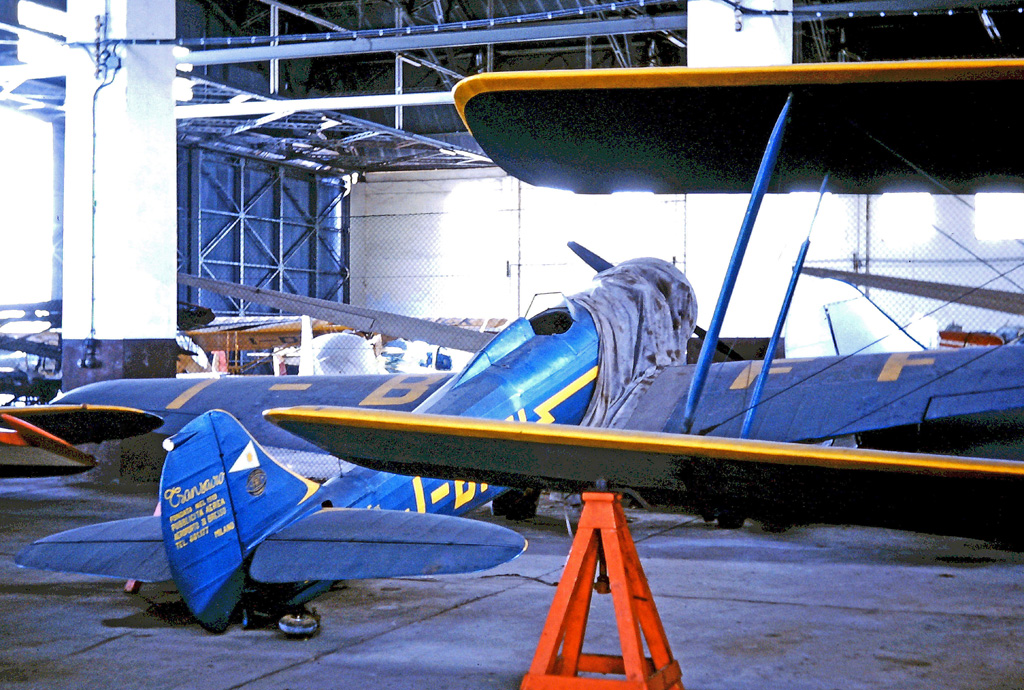
The surviving Fiat G.5 bis I-BFFI at Milan (Bresso) airfield in 1965

Some aircraft were later modified to single-seat configuration. One example of the G.5bis, registered I-BFFI, survived in civil ownership and operation until at least 1955 and is now preserved in a museum.

== Variants ==
G.5
Production variant with 135hp (101kW) Fiat A.70 radial engine.
G.5/2
Prototype with a 140hp (104kW) Fiat A.60 inline engine.
G.5bis
Improved variant with a 200hp (149kW) Fiat A.70 radial engine.

== Specifications (G.5bis) ==
Data from

General characteristics

- Crew: two
- Length: 7.93 m (26 ft 0 in)
- Wingspan: 10.46 m (34 ft 4 in)
- Height: 2.44 m (8 ft 0 in)
- Wing area: 17.18 m^{2} (184.9 sq ft)
- Empty weight: 630 kg (1,389 lb)
- Max takeoff weight: 850 kg (1,874 lb)
- Powerplant: 1 × Fiat A.70 7-cylinder radial piston engine, 150 kW (200 hp)

Performance

- Maximum speed: 265 km/h (165 mph, 143 kn)
- Range: 635 km (395 mi, 343 nmi)
- Service ceiling: 7,000 m (23,000 ft)
