= Nardi FN.316 =

Italian advanced fighter trainer monoplane

General information
- Type: Advanced fighter trainer
- Manufacturer: Fratelli Nardi
- Primary user: Italian Air Force
- Number built: 49

History
- Introduction date: 1942
- First flight: 1941
- Developed from: Nardi FN.305

The Nardi FN.316 was an Italian advanced fighter trainer monoplane developed by the Fratelli Nardi company from the Nardi FN.305.

== Development ==
The FN.316 was an improved version of the Nardi FN.305, designed as an advanced fighter trainer. The prototype first flew in late 1941. The FN.316 was a low-wing cantilever monoplane powered by a nose-mounted 270 hp (210 kW) Isotta Frashchini Beta RC 10 1Z. The engine had serious cooling problems and only an initial order for 50 aircraft was placed for the Italian Air Force. The production aircraft had modified tail units and the single-seater had an enclosed cockpit. Both single-seat (FN.316M) and two-seat (FN.316B) variants were produced.

== Operational service ==
The two-seat FN.316Bs entered service with Italian Air Force flying schools in January 1942, followed by the one-seat FN.316Ms in June 1943. After the armistice seven aircraft were flown by the German Luftwaffe in Northern Italy

== Variants ==
FN.316
Prototype, one built
FN.316B
Two-seater production variant, 19 built.
FN.316M
Single-seat production variant, 30 built.

== Operators ==
Germany

- Luftwaffe

Kingdom of Italy

- Regia Aeronautica

== Specifications (FN.316M) ==
General characteristics

- Crew: one
- Powerplant: 1 × Isotta Fraschini Beta RC 10 1Z , 210 kW (270 hp)

Performance

- Maximum speed: 330 km/h (205 mph, 178 kn)
- Range: 740 km (460 mi, 400 nmi)
- Service ceiling: 6,500 m (21,325 ft)

Armament

- 1 or 2 x 7.7mm (0.303in) synchronised machine-gun
