= CANT Z.1012 =

Monoplane built in Italy in the late 1930s

Z.1012

General information
- Type: light civil transport
- National origin: Italy
- Manufacturer: Cantieri Riuniti dell'Adriatico CANT
- Primary user: Italian government
- Number built: 5

History
- First flight: 17 November 1937
- Retired: c.1943

The CANT Z.1012 was a small three-engined monoplane built in Italy in the late 1930s to carry either three or five passengers depending on the engines. A small number were built for Italian diplomatic use.

== Design and development ==
In 1937 CANT (Cantieri Riuniti dell'Adriatico) won a contract to build an aircraft for the Italian diplomatic corps in their embassies abroad. The result was the CANT Z.1012.

It was a low wing cantilever monoplane with an aerodynamically clean wooden structure and plywood skin. The single spar wings were tapered, carrying balanced ailerons and slotted flaps inboard. The fuselage had an oval cross-section and was built on a keel with longitudinal members and transverse frames. The cabin, over the wing, was fully glazed and had a starboard side seat for one passenger alongside the pilot with a bench seat behind for two more. A third row could be included if a lower fuel load was carried. The back of the bench seat folded for access to a baggage compartment. The fin was integral with the fuselage and was quite tall, carrying the tailplane about halfway up. The tailplane was braced below to the fuselage. Both rudder and elevators were fabric covered and both mass and horn balanced.

The Z.1012 was powered by three inverted air-cooled inline engines, one mounted in the nose and the other two in long fairings on the wings. There were two engine options, either the 90 kW (120 hp) Alfa-Romeo 110, a four-cylinder unit, or its six-cylinder relative, the 138 kW (185 hp) Alfa-Romeo 115. The more powerful engines raised the top speed by 48 km/h (30 mph) . The main undercarriage units retracted into the engine fairings but the tail wheel was fixed.

The Z.1012 first flew on 13 November 1937 with the four-cylinder engines, appearing at the Belgrade air show that summer. This aircraft was used by the Italian Air Attaché in Washington. Two similar aircraft followed, the first bound for the Italian embassy in Brazil and the second owned by Bruno Mussolini. Two more were built with the bigger engines and were used by Air Marshall Italo Balbo and by General Giuseppe Valle.

== Specifications (Alfa-Romeo 110) ==
Data from Grey 1972, p. 177c

General characteristics

- Crew: 1
- Capacity: 3
- Length: 10.0 m (32 ft 10 in)
- Wingspan: 15.0 m (49 ft 2.5 in)
- Height: 3.63 m (11 ft 11 in)
- Wing area: 25 m^{2} (269 sq ft)
- Empty weight: 1,950 kg (4,299 lb)
- Gross weight: 2,750 kg (6,063 lb)
- Powerplant: 3 × Alfa-Romeo 110 4-cylinder air-cooled inverted inline , 90 kW (120 hp) each

Performance

- Maximum speed: 280 km/h (174 mph, 151 kn)
- Cruise speed: 240 km/h (149 mph, 129 kn)
- Range: 1,300 km (808 mi, 702 nmi)
- Service ceiling: 5,000 m (16,400 ft)
- Rate of climb: 2.38 m/s (469 ft/min) to 2,000 m (6,562 ft)
