= Nardi FN.315 =

Italian training monoplane

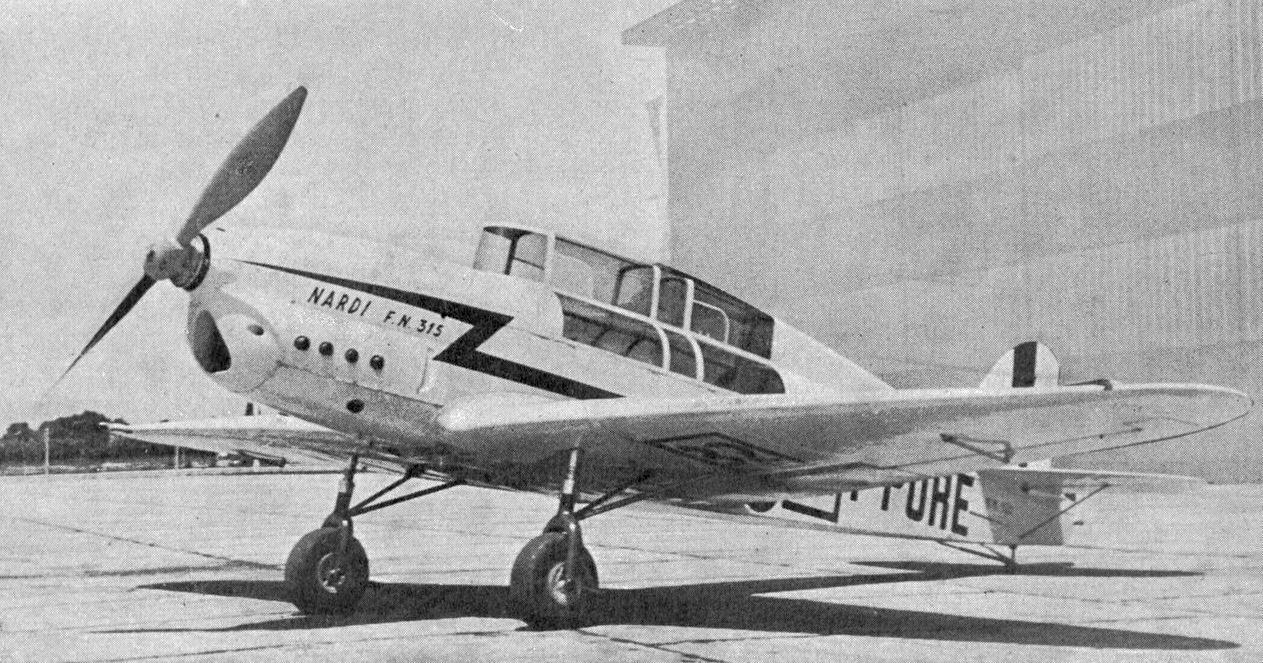

General information
- Type: Training monoplane
- Manufacturer: Fratelli Nardi
- Primary users: Italian Air Force Swiss Air Force
- Number built: 31 + 2 prototypes

History
- First flight: 1938
- Developed from: Nardi FN.305

The Nardi FN.315 was an Italian training monoplane developed from the earlier Nardi FN.305 and produced by the Fratelli Nardi company.

== Development ==
First flown on 10 July 1938 the FN.315 was an improved version of the FN.305. It had a revised tail unit, improved cockpit canopy and wing improvements. The FN.315 was a low-wing cantilever monoplane of mixed construction. It had tailskid landing gear, with the main gear retracting inwards, and room for two crew in tandem in an enclosed cockpit. It was powered by a nose-mounted inline piston engine and various engines were evaluated during flight trials, originally with a 205 hp (153 kW) Alfa-Romeo 115 and also a 200 hp (149 kW) Argus As 10E and a 230 hp (172 kW) Hirth HM.508.

The aircraft went into production and six Hirth-powered aircraft were produced, including two for the Swiss Air Force. A further 25 Alfa-Romeo powered aircraft were built for the Italian Air Force and were used as intermediate trainers.

== Operators ==
Kingdom of Italy

- Regia Aeronautica

Hungary

- Royal Hungarian Air Force

Romania

- Royal Romanian Air Force
- Romanian Air Force - Postwar.

Switzerland

- Swiss Air Force

== Specifications (FN.315 Alfa Romeo) ==
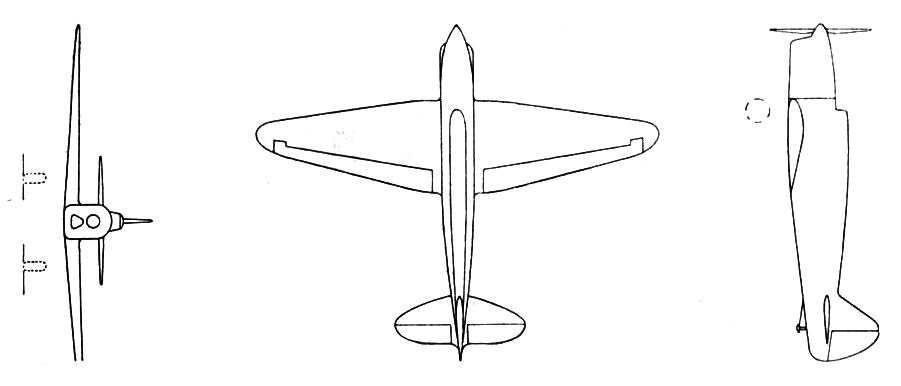
Nardi FN.315 3-view drawing from L'Aerophile June 1939

General characteristics

- Crew: 2
- Length: 6.98 m (22 ft 11 in)
- Wingspan: 8.47 m (27 ft 9.5 in)
- Height: 2.10 m (6 ft 11 in)
- Wing area: 12 m^{2} (130 sq ft)
- Gross weight: 1,045 kg (2,304 lb)
- Powerplant: 1 × Alfa Romeo 115-1 inline piston engine , 153 kW (205 hp)

Performance

- Maximum speed: 315 km/h (196 mph, 170 kn)
- Range: 620 km (390 mi, 330 nmi)
- Service ceiling: 6,000 m (20,000 ft)

== See also ==
Related lists

- List of Interwar military aircraft
- List of aircraft of World War II
