= Fratelli Nardi =

20th Century Italian Aircraft manufacturer

Fratelli Nardi was an Italian aircraft manufacturer formed in the early 1930s.

== History ==
The partnership Fratelli Nardi was formed by the brothers Euste, Elio and Luigi Nardi in Milan, Italy. They started building their first aircraft in 1934 and the FN.305 first flew in February 1935.

The company built a number of prototypes but due to the small size of their factory the series production of their aircraft was sub-contracted to other companies like Piaggio and Savoia-Marchetti.

== Aircraft ==
- Nardi FN.305 - 1935
- Nardi FN.310 - 1936
- Nardi FN.315 - 1938
- Nardi FN.316 - 1941
- Nardi FN.333 Riviera - 1952

== See also ==
- List of Italian companies
