= Klemm Kl 31 =

Type of aircraft

Kl 31

General information
- Type: Touring aircraft
- National origin: Germany
- Manufacturer: Klemm
- Designer: Robert Lusser

History
- First flight: 1931

The Klemm Kl 31 was a touring aircraft, developed in Germany in the early 1930s. It was a conventional, low-wing cantilever monoplane with four seats in an enclosed cabin. The fixed, tailskid undercarriage had divided mainwheel units. The fuselage was built from welded steel tube, while the wings were wooden. Some Kl 31s saw service with the Luftwaffe as training and liaison aircraft.

== Operators ==
Germany

- Luftwaffe

Hungary

- Royal Hungarian Air Force

== Specifications ==
General characteristics

- Crew: one pilot
- Capacity: three passengers
- Length: 8.50 m (27 ft 11 in)
- Wingspan: 13.50 m (44 ft 4 in)
- Height: 2.30 m (7 ft 7 in)
- Wing area: 20.8 m^{2} (224 sq ft)
- Empty weight: 690 kg (1,520 lb)
- Gross weight: 1,250 kg (2,750 lb)
- Powerplant: 1 × Bramo Sh 14a , 120 kW (160 hp)

Performance

- Maximum speed: 190 km/h (120 mph, 100 kn)
- Range: 735 km (460 mi, 400 nmi)
- Service ceiling: 3,800 m (12,500 ft)
- Rate of climb: 2.3 m/s (460 ft/min)
