= Nardis =

Nardis may refer to:

- Nardis (composition), a 1958 modal jazz composition by Miles Davis
- Nardis (album), a 1985 album by Jimmy Raney and Doug Raney featuring the Davis composition
- Nardis Records, a record company founded in 2003
- Cascate Nardis, a waterfall in Trentino, Italy

== See also ==
- Laura DeNardis (born 1966), American scholar of internet architecture and governance
- Lawrence J. DeNardis (1938–2018), American politician
