= Cascate Nardis =

Waterfall in Trentino, Italy

Coordinates: 46°10′07″N 10°42′53″E

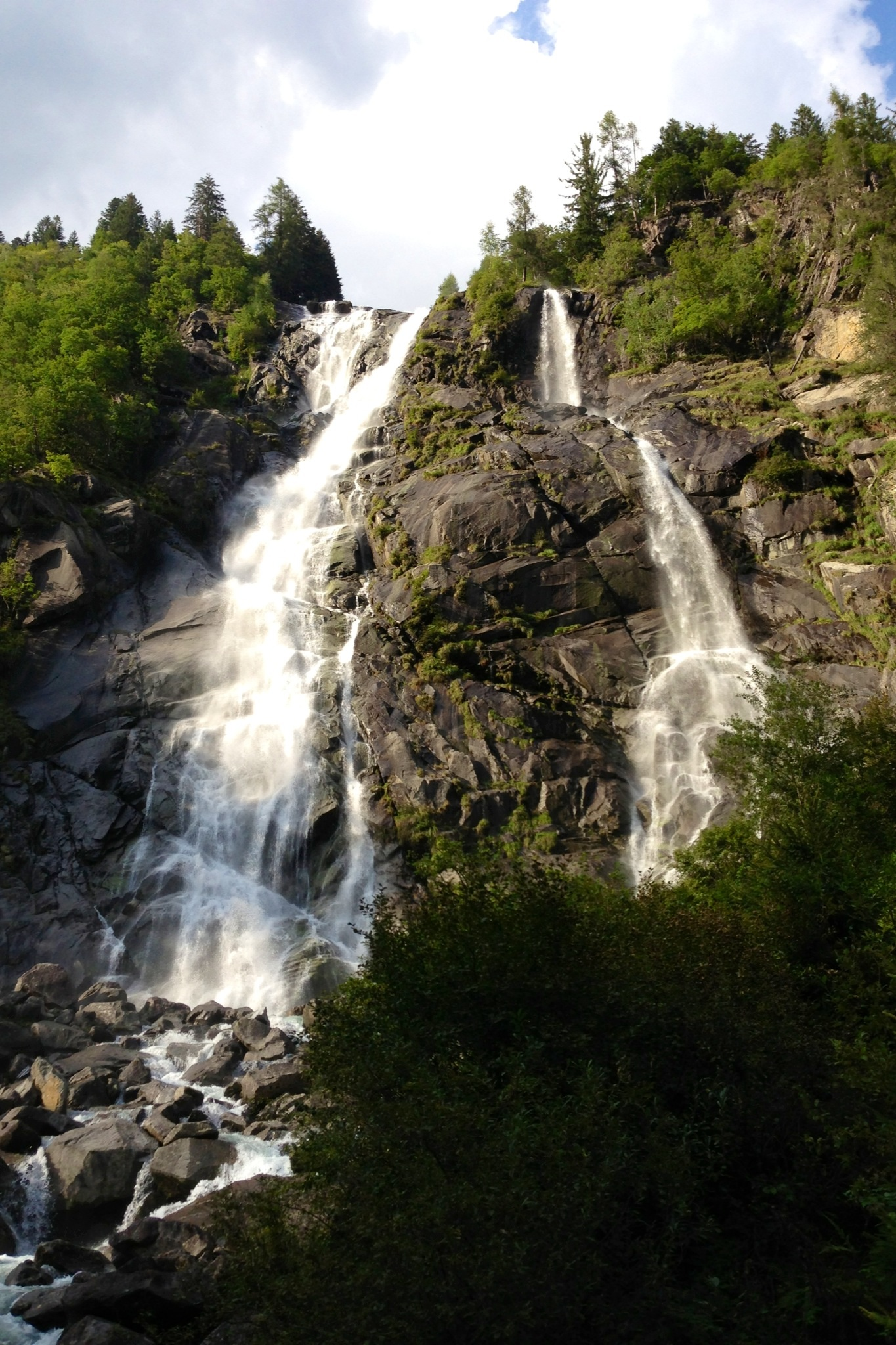
The Nardìs Waterfall

The Nardìs Waterfall is one of the waterfalls of Trentino in Val di Genova, a valley adjacent to Val Rendena. It descents from the Presanella glacier, falling into the valley to 921 m, with an enormous jump of more than 130 meters and the incline between 55° and 65°. The waterfall is surrounded by glacial valleys, and in the winter months it is not possible to visit the location due to the climate.

== Access ==
Arriving at town of Carisolo taking Strada Statale 239 di Campiglio and then take an adjacent road that leads to Val di Genova.

== See also ==
- List of waterfalls
