= Alfa Romeo 115 =

Air-cooled aircraft engine

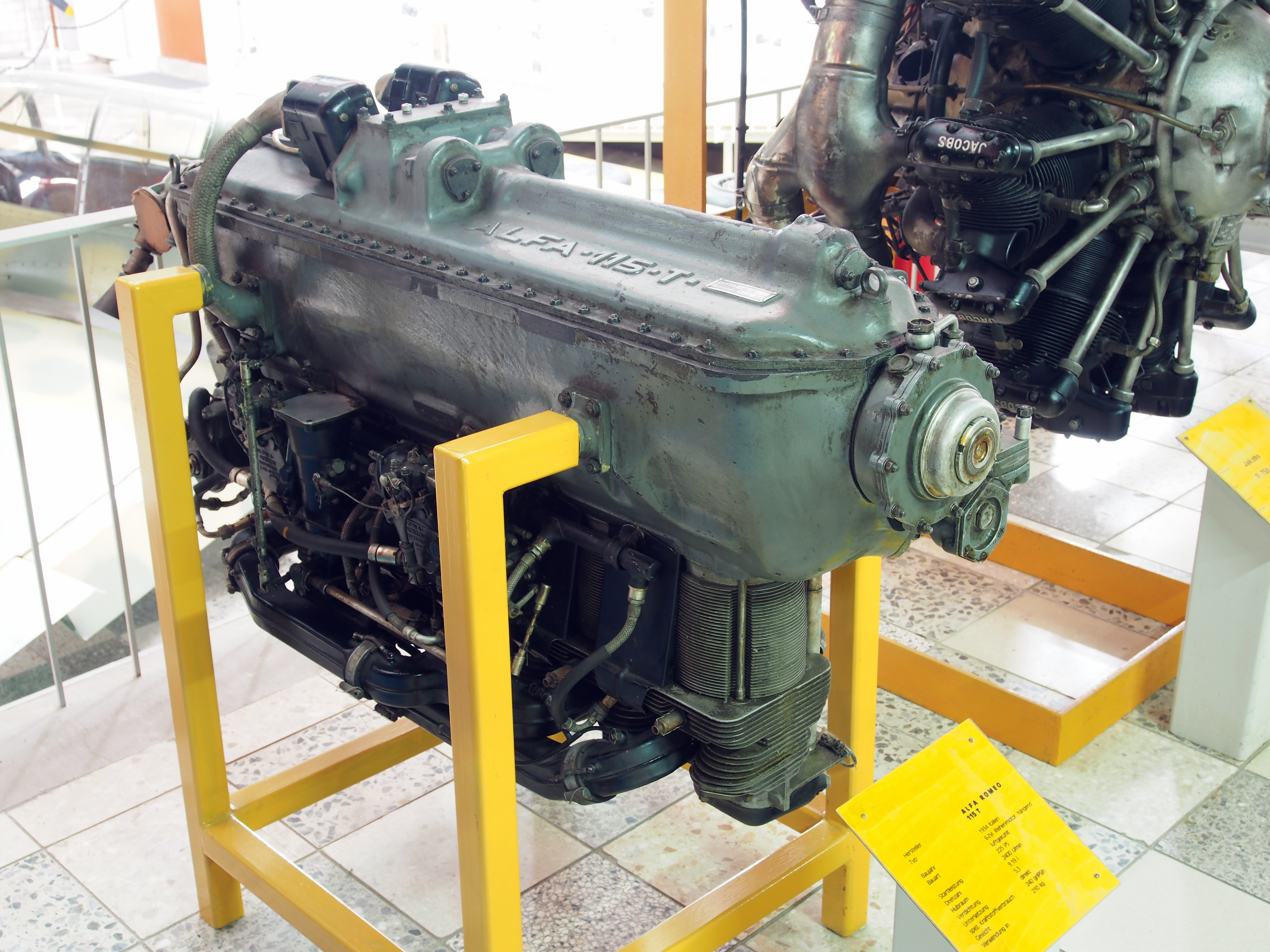
- Alfa Romeo 115
- Type: Piston aircraft engine
- Manufacturer: Alfa Romeo
- First run: 1930s
- Number built: 115 ~1,600

The Alfa Romeo 115 is an Italian six-cylinder air-cooled inverted inline engine for aircraft use, mainly for training and light planes, based on the de Havilland Gipsy Six engine. Production totalled approximately 1,600 units. Derivatives of the 115 include the -1, bis, ter and Alfa Romeo 116.

== Description ==
The Alfa Romeo 115 series of engines closely follows the original de Havilland Gipsy Six engines in having one-piece Elektron casting crankcases with cover plates, steel cylinders, finned for cooling, and detachable aluminium alloy cylinder heads. The six-throw one-piece counterbalanced crankshaft is carried in seven plain journal bearings and the propeller is driven directly by the crankshaft.

== Variants ==
110ter

4-cylinder version of the 115ter
115-1 (115-I)
115bis (115-2 / 115-II)
115ter (115-3 / 115-III)
116-1 (116-I)
The 115 bored out to 120 mm (4.72 in) developing 160 kW (220 hp) at 2,360 rpm, otherwise similar.

== Applications ==
- Ambrosini SAI.2S (115-1)
- Ambrosini SAI.3
- Ambrosini S.7 (115ter)
- Bestetti BN.1 (one prototype)
- Breda Ba.79S
- CANT Z.1012 (or 110)
- Caproni Ca.164
- Caproni Ca.309 Ghibli (115bis)
- Fiat G.46-1B (115bis)
- Fiat G.46-3B (115bis)
- Fiat G.46-4B (115bis)
- Fiat G.46-A (115ter)
- Fiat G.46-3A (115ter)
- Fiat G.46-4A (115ter)
- Nardi FN.305
- Nardi FN.315
- Saiman 200

== Specifications (115-1) ==
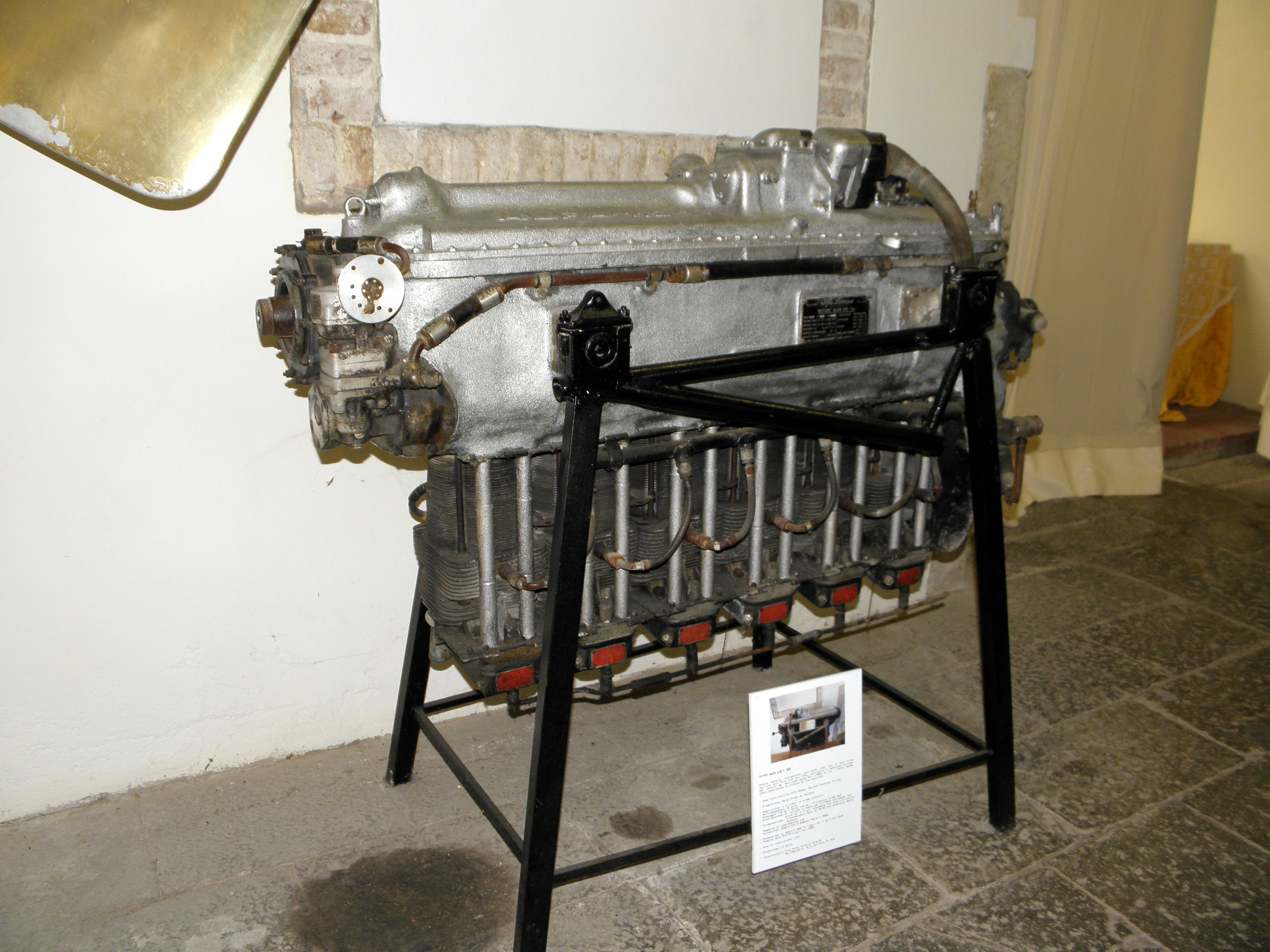
The Alfa 115ter displayed at Museo dell'aria e dello spazio of San Pelagio, Due Carrare, province of Padua, Italy

Data from Jane's All The World's Aircraft 1938, Italian Civil and Military aircraft 1930–1945, and Aircraft Engines of the World 1945

=== General characteristics ===
- Type: Six-cylinder inverted air-cooled inline engine
- Bore: 118 mm (4.65 in)
- Stroke: 140 mm (5.51 in)
- Displacement: 9.187 L (560.6 cu in)
- Length: 1,642 mm (64.65 in)
- Width: 498 mm (19.6 in)
- Height: 825 mm (32.5 in)
- Dry weight: 210 kg (463.0 lb)
- Frontal Area: 0.35 m^{2} (3.8 sq ft)

=== Components ===
- Valvetrain: Two valves per cylinder, sodium-cooled exhaust valves
- Fuel system: Two Mona-Hobson AI48D downdraught carburettors with mixture control
- Fuel type: 73 octane
- Oil system: 2.8–3.1 bar (40–45 psi), dry sump with one pressure and three scavenge pumps.
- Oil consumption: 0.01095 kg/(kW h) (0.018 lb/(hp h))
- Cooling system: Air-cooled
- Reduction gear: Direct drive
- Starter: Hand starter
- Ignition: 2 x Marelli magnetos, 2 x spark plugs per cylinder.

=== Performance ===
- Power output:

- Maximum power: 153 kW (205 hp) at 2,350 rpm
- Normal: 145 kW (195 hp) at 2,200 rpm
- Cruising: 100 kW (140 hp) at 1,500 rpm

- Compression ratio: 6.5:1
- Specific fuel consumption: 0.322 kg/(kW h) (0.53 lb/(hp h)) (take-off)
- Oil consumption: 0.011 kg/(kW h) (0.018 lb/(hp h))
- Power-to-weight ratio: 0.727 kW/kg (0.4425 hp/lb)

== See also ==
Comparable engines

- de Havilland Gipsy Six
- Hirth HM 506
- Menasco Buccaneer
- Ranger 6-440
- Walter Minor 6

Related lists

- List of aircraft engines
