= Nardi FN.305 =

Italian fighter trainer and liaison monoplane

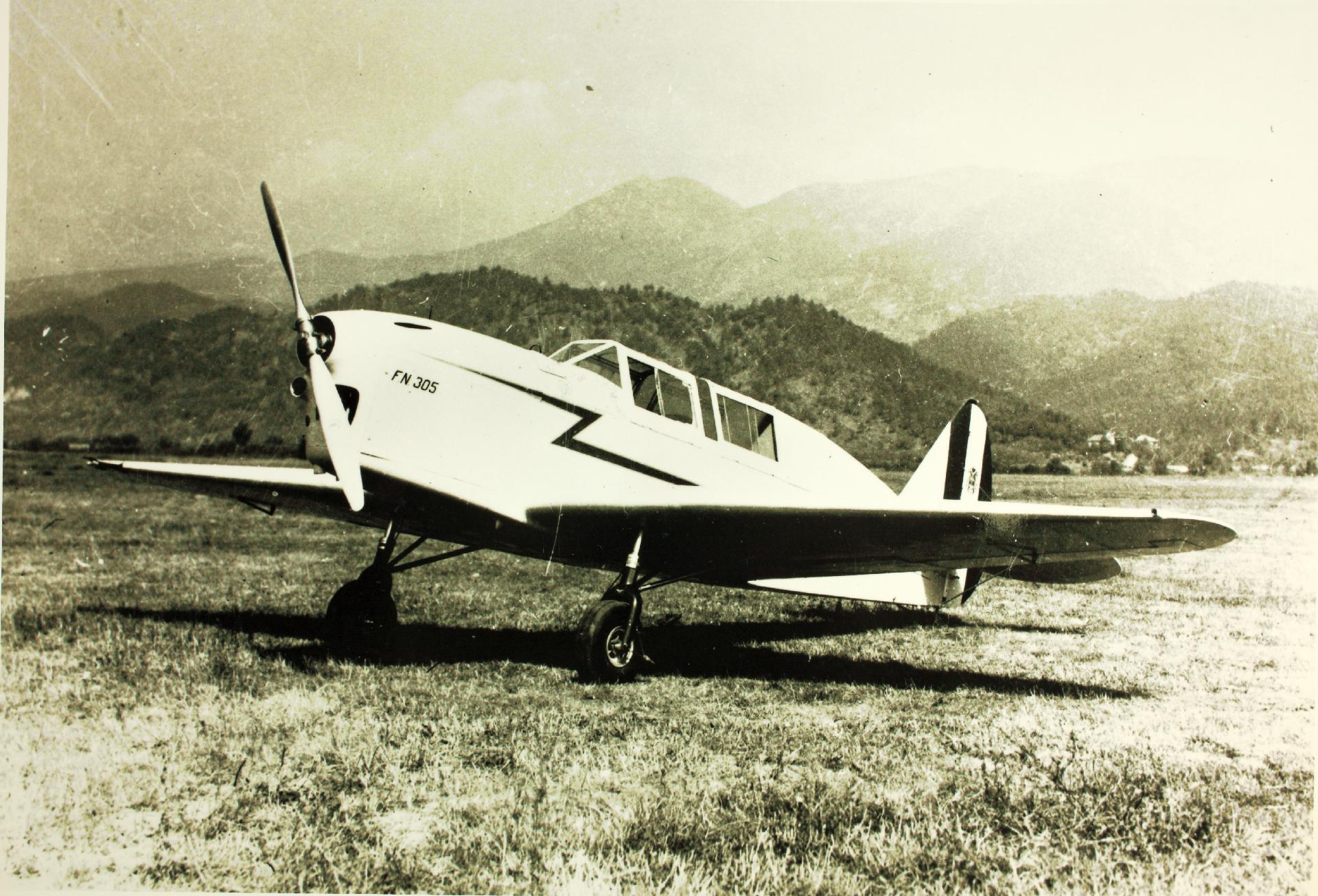
- Two-seat FN.305

General information
- Type: Fighter trainer and liaison monoplane
- Manufacturer: Fratelli Nardi
- Primary users: Italian Air Force Hungarian Air Force; Romanian Air Force
- Number built: 208 + 3 prototypes

History
- Manufactured: 1937-1943
- First flight: 19 February 1935
- Retired: 1948
- Variants: Nardi FN.315; Nardi FN.316

The Nardi FN.305 was an Italian fighter trainer and liaison monoplane developed by the Fratelli Nardi company.

== Development ==
The FN.305 was designed as a trainer and liaison aircraft and the prototype first flew on 19 January 1935. The FN.305 was a low-wing cantilever monoplane of mixed construction. It had tailskid landing gear, with the main gear retracting inwards. It was powered by a nose-mounted 200 hp (149 kW) Fiat A.70S inline piston engine. The prototype was a tandem two-seater with an enclosed cockpit. It was intended to produce both single-seat and two-seat variants and the next prototype was a single-seat fighter trainer followed by a two-seat basic trainer prototype which both had open cockpits.

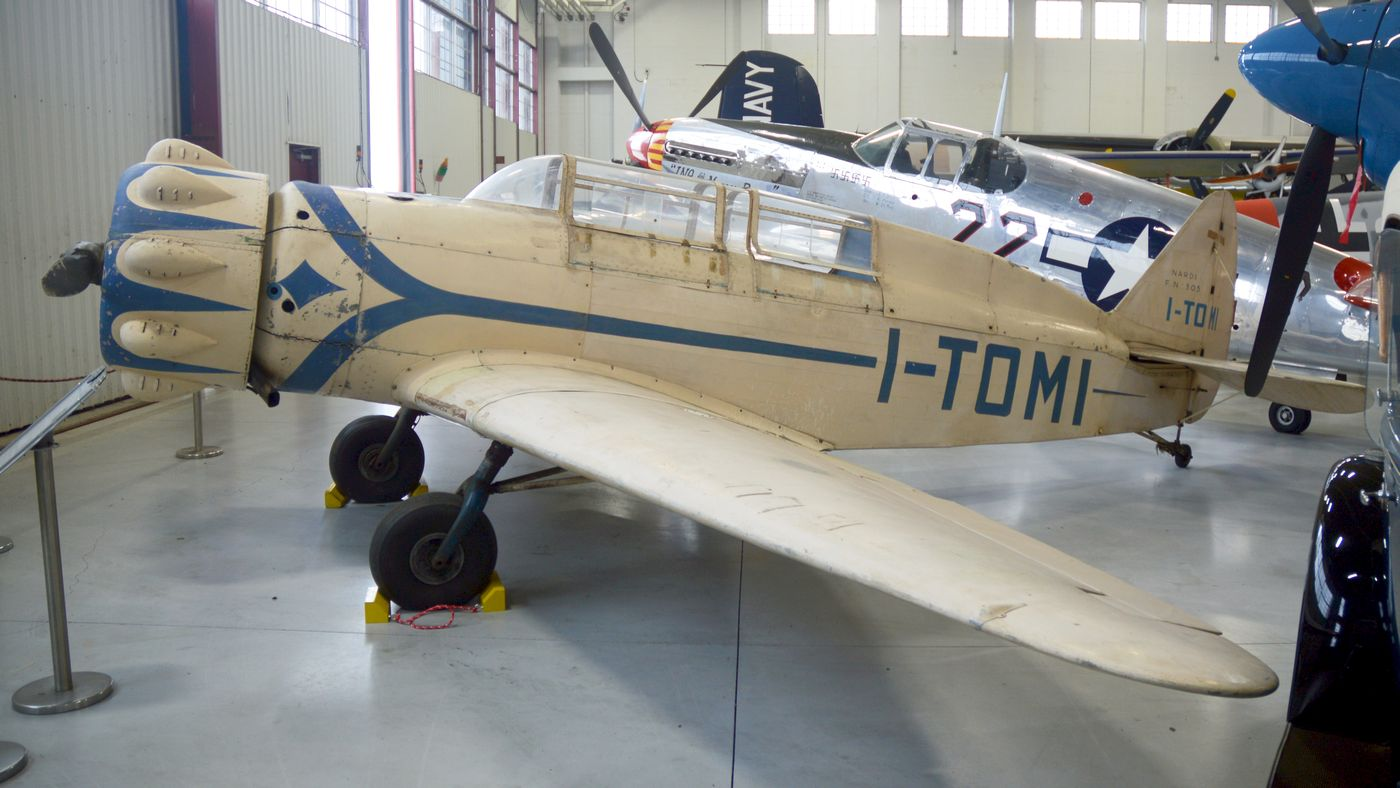
Nardi FN.305D two-seater I-TOMI at Fantasy of Flight, Polk City, Florida

Two long-range FN.305D variants were then produced powered by a 200 hp (149 kW) Walter Bora radial engine. The first FN.305D was a two-seater which was used on a record-breaking flight between Rome and Addis Ababa in March 1939 gaining a class record for covering the 4463.8 km (2,773,68 miles) at an average speed of 240 km/h (149 mph). The second FN.305D was a single-seater bought by Yugoslavia for an aborted attempt at a nonstop North Atlantic flight.

The prototype was re-engined with an Alfa Romeo 115 engine as the FN.305A which then entered production by Piaggio as the Nardi works were not large enough. The Italian Air Force had ordered 258 aircraft, most of them two-seat FN.305A fighter trainers and liaison aircraft. A few of the aircraft were completed as single-seat open-cockpit FN.305Cs and enclosed-cockpit FN.305Ds. Following the Italian order in 1938 nine aircraft were sold to Chile and 31 to Romania. Romania then built 124 aircraft under licence by SET. The largest export order came from France, which ordered 300 but only 41 had been delivered when Italy declared war on France in June 1940. They were used as liaison aircraft and fighter trainers. The final export customer was Hungary which ordered 50.

An improved version was developed as the Nardi FN.315.

== Variants ==
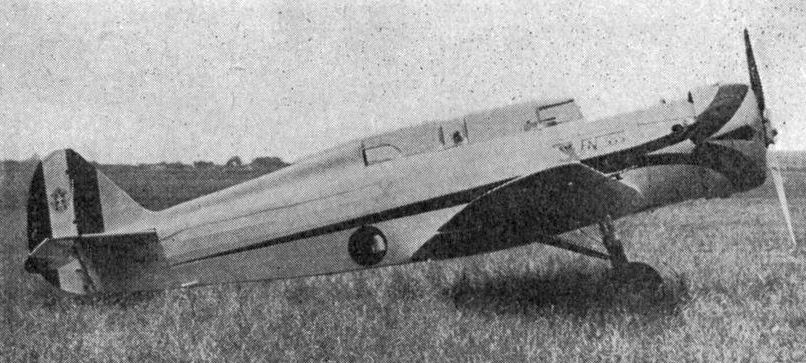
Nardi FN.305 photo from L'Aerophile March 1939

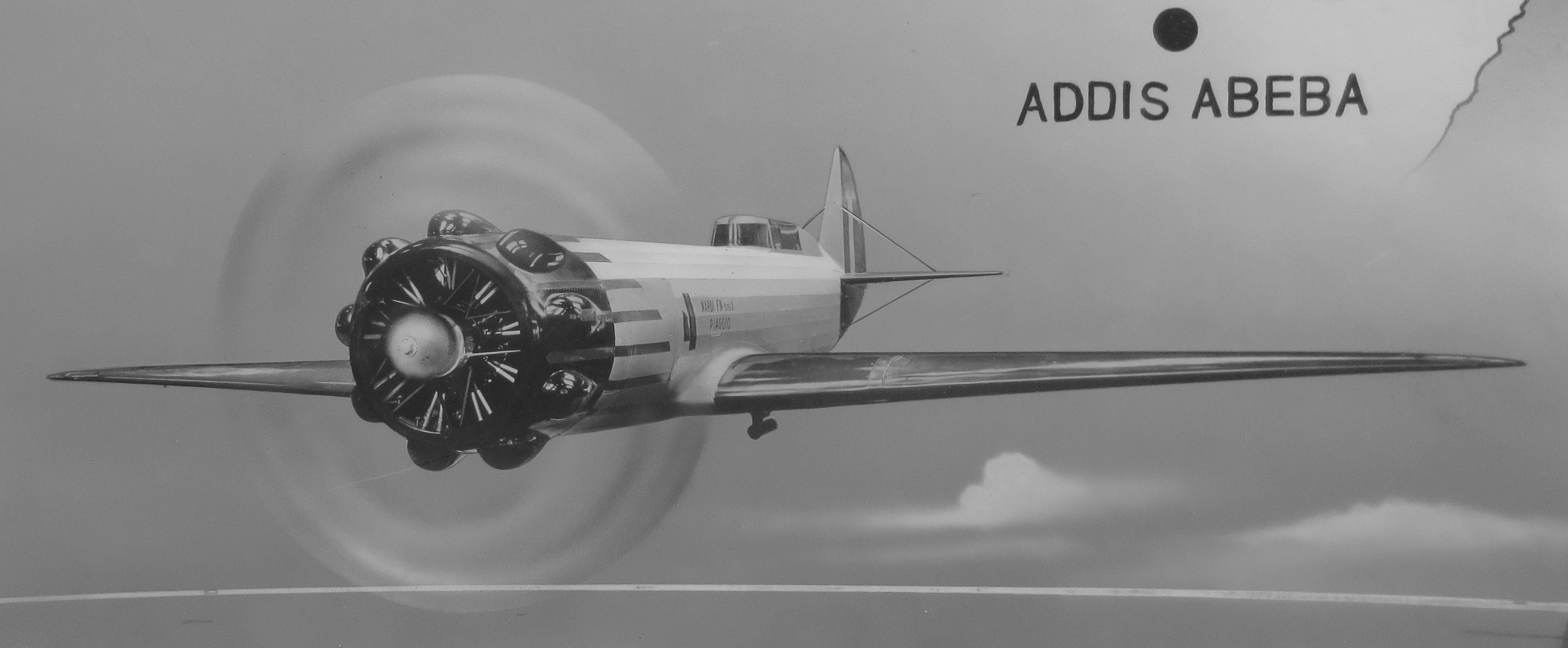
Nardi FN.305D with Walter Bora (1938)

FN.305
Prototype
FN.305A
Two-seater and main production variant.
FN.305B
Single-seat open cockpit variant.
FN.305C
Single-seat enclosed cockpit variant
FN.305D
Long-range variant with a 200hp (149kW) Walter Bora radial engine, two built, one single-seater and one two-seater.

== Operators ==
Bulgaria

- Bulgarian Air Force - one aircraft

France

- French Air Force - 41 aircraft

Hungary

- Royal Hungarian Air Force - 50 aircraft

Kingdom of Italy

- Regia Aeronautica - 285 aircraft
- Italian Co-Belligerent Air Force

Italy

- Aeronautica Militare Italiana operated 10 aircraft until 1948

Romania

- Royal Romanian Air Force - 31 aircraft

Chile

- Chilean Air Force - 9 aircraft

== Specifications (FN.305A) ==
Data from The Illustrated Encyclopedia of Aircraft (Part Work 1982-1985). Orbis Publishing. p. 2594.

General characteristics

- Crew: two
- Length: 6.98 m (22 ft 10.75 in)
- Wingspan: 8.47 m (27 ft 9.5 in)
- Height: 2.10 m (6 ft 10.75 in)
- Wing area: 12 m^{2} (129.17 sq ft)
- Empty weight: 704 kg (1,552 lb)
- Gross weight: 984 kg (2,169 lb)
- Powerplant: 1 × Alfa Romeo 115 inline piston engine , 138 kW (185 hp)

Performance

- Maximum speed: 300 km/h (186 mph, 162 kn)
- Range: 620 km (385 mi, 335 nmi)
- Service ceiling: 6,000 m (19,685 ft)

Armament

- 2 7.7 mm (0.303 in) Breda-SAFAT machine-guns.

== See also ==
Related lists

- List of Interwar military aircraft

== Bibliography ==
- Domange, Yves (February 1999). "Quand les démocraties occidentales achetaient des avions dans l'Italie fasciste... (1^{ère} partie: la France)" [When Western Democracies Bought Their Aircraft from Fascist Italy... (Part 1: France)]. Avions: Toute l'aéronautique et son histoire (in French) (71): 16–24. ISSN 1243-8650.
- Taylor, Michael J. H. (1989). Jane's Encyclopedia of Aviation. London: Studio Editions.
- The Illustrated Encyclopedia of Aircraft (Part Work 1982-1985). Orbis Publishing. pp. 2593–4.
