= Praga E-51 =

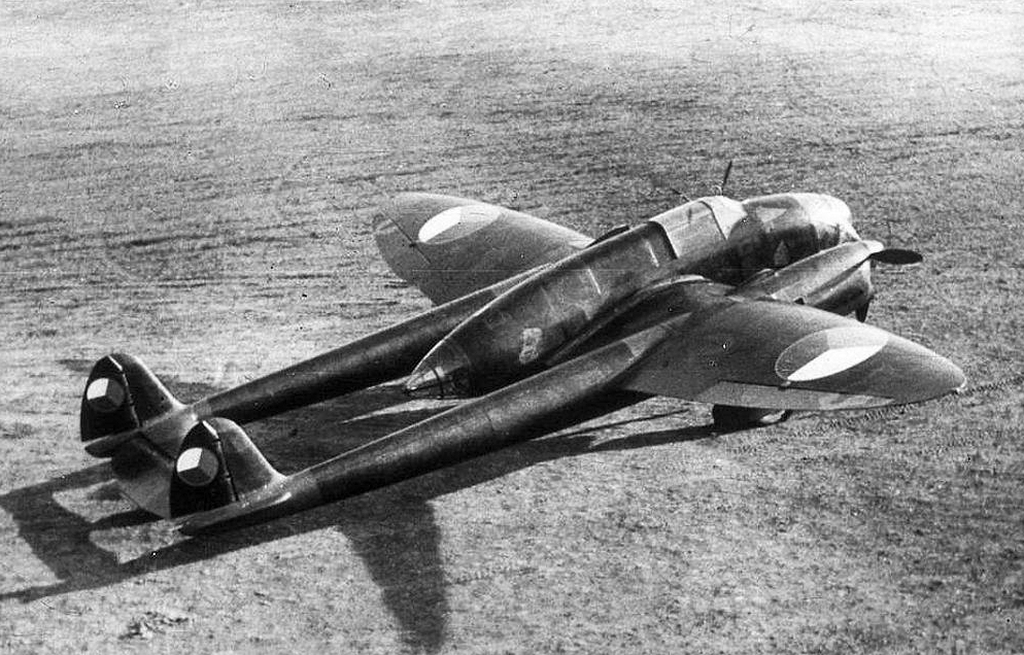

General information
- Type: reconnaissance and light bomber
- National origin: Czechoslovakia
- Manufacturer: Praga
- Designer: Jaroslav Šlechta
- Number built: 1 prototype

History
- First flight: 26 May 1938

The Praga E-51 is a Czechoslovak reconnaissance aircraft and light bomber built by Praga in the 1930s. Development was halted by the annexation of Czechoslovakia by Germany, after only one prototype had been built. The appearance of the construction is very reminiscent of the contemporary twin engined fighter, the Fokker G.I from the Netherlands.

== Design and development ==
The unconventional twin-boom airplane project under Jaroslav Šlechta began in 1936 as a response to a Ministry of National Defence specification which called for the design and construction of a new reconnaissance aircraft to operate over combat zones. The short-range reconnaissance three-seater was to be capable of monitoring activity behind enemy lines; the requirement highlighted the importance of good view from the cockpit as well as of placement of the on-board cameras, which were to be able to collect as many shots as possible at as wide an angle as possible in one flyover. The new aircraft was to replace the aging Letov Š-328 and Aero A.100. There were three entries to the tender: the Letov Š-50, the ČKD-Praga E-51 and the Aero A.304.

The E-51 was designed as a twin-boom twin-engine mid wing aircraft with a central nacelle housing the cockpit and armament; the booms were elongations of the engine nacelles and each carried a rudder, with the elevator placed between them. The E-51 was Šlechta's first design based on such a configuration. Because the reconnaissance airplane had to be able to escape enemy fighters, a high top speed was a number one priority, meaning a suitable engine had to be found. Šlechta considered three options: the inline Praga FR with an output of 456 kW/355 hp, the inverted V-12 Walter Sagitta with an output of 367-412 kW/500-600 hp, and the radial 9-cylinder Avia Rk.17 at 261 kW/355 hp. As Praga's FR had not been finished yet and the Rk.17 was not powerful enough, Šlechta opted for the Sagitta. It was the first and only implementation of the Czechoslovak engine by Walter Aircraft Engines in a Czechoslovak airplane.

The aircraft was made using Czechoslovakia-supplied material and fitted with Czechoslovak (with a few exceptions) armaments. The simple wood and welded steel-tubes frame made both assembly and maintenance easy, and operation as well. The durability of the skin allowed for outdoor storage while on duty. The design is said to precede that of the Fokker G.I, a more well-known example of the same design configuration, as the latter has, unlike the E-51, actually entered service.

The E-51 was the last design by Praga before World War II began.

== Gallery ==
Praga E-51
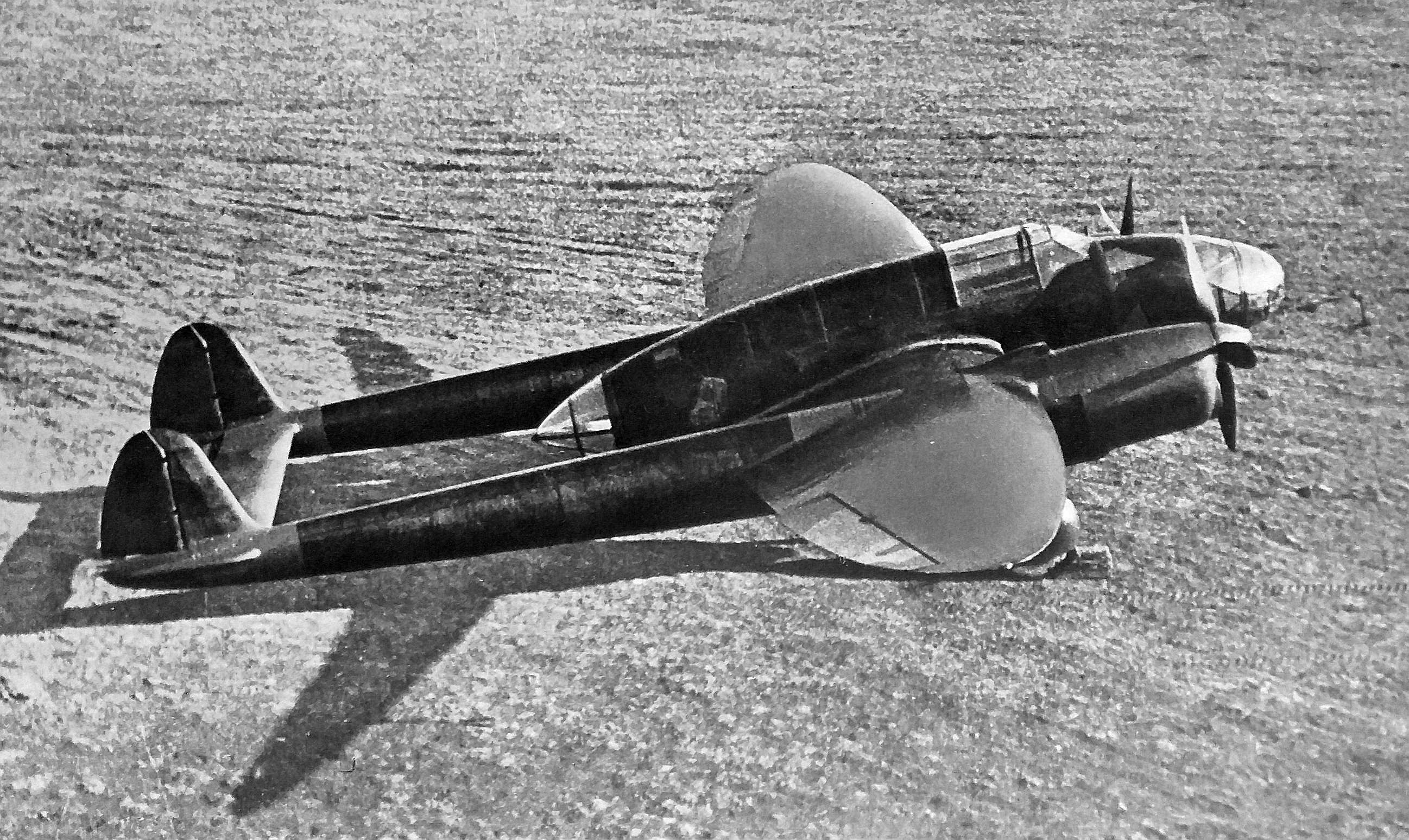
The E-51 side view

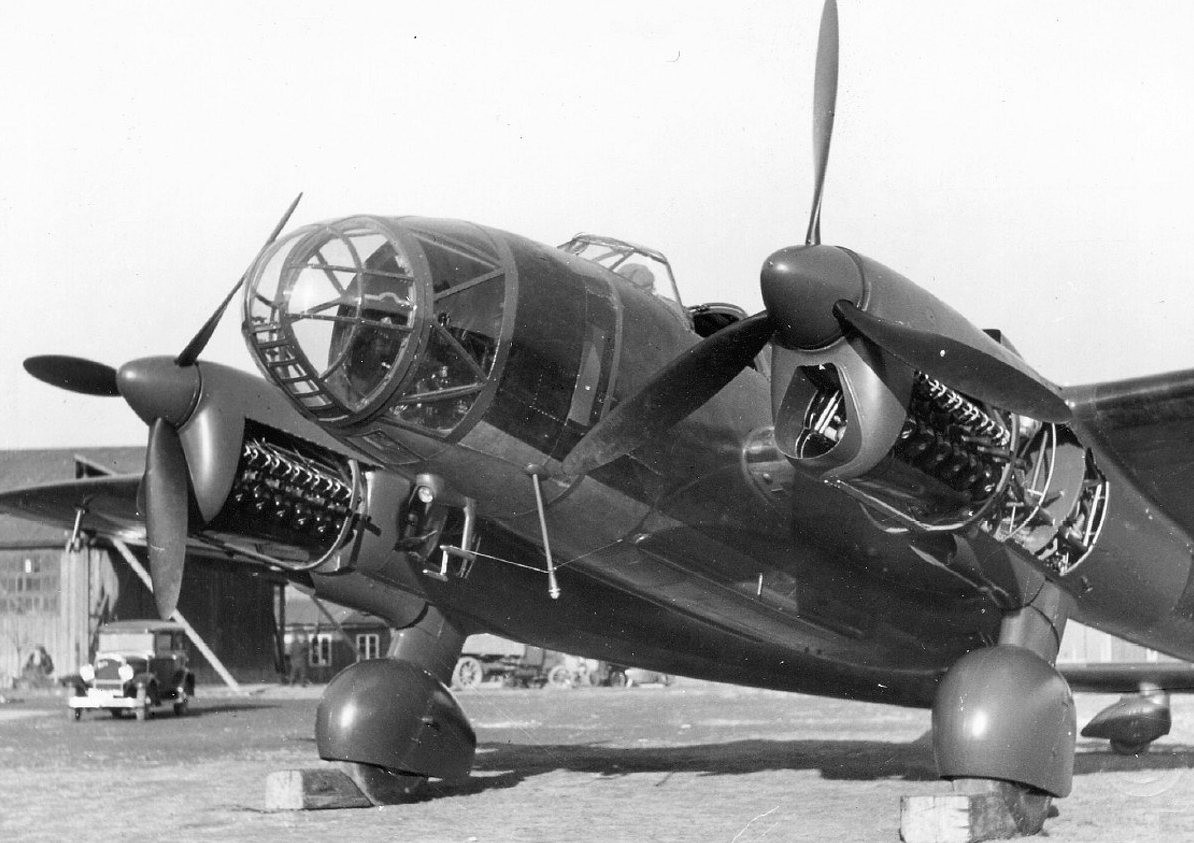
The E-51 with engine cowlings removed

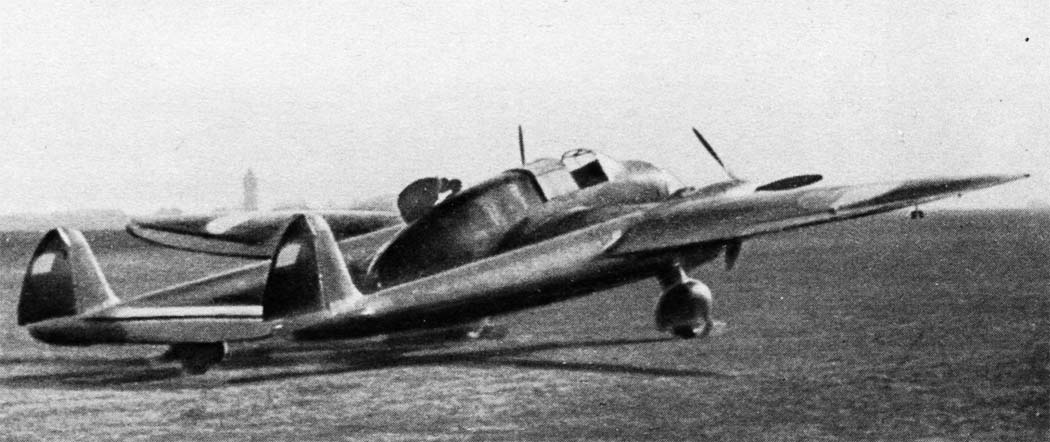
The E-51 rear quarter view

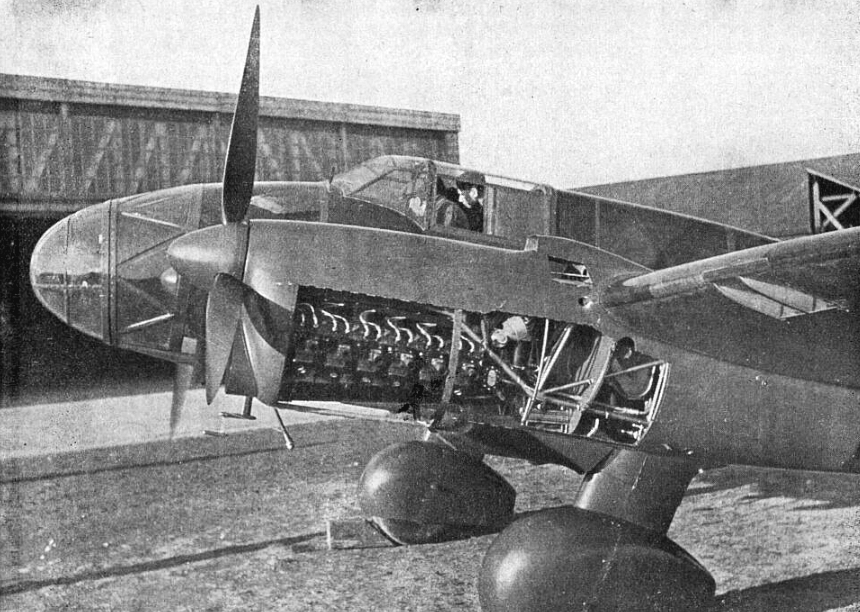
The E-51 with engine cowlings removed during ground runs

== Specifications (E-51) ==
Data from PRAGA E-51

General characteristics

- Crew: 3
- Length: 11.69 m (38 ft 4 in)
- Wingspan: 15.6 m (51 ft 2 in)
- Wing area: 35.44 m^{2} (381.5 sq ft)
- Empty weight: 3,102 kg (6,839 lb)
- Powerplant: 2 × Walter Sagitta I-MR V-12 inverted air-cooled piston engines, 404 kW (542 hp) each
- Propellers: 3-bladed variable-pitch propellers

Performance

- Maximum speed: 380 km/h (240 mph, 210 kn)
- Range: 1,250 km (780 mi, 670 nmi) ~
- Service ceiling: 7,000 m (23,000 ft)
- Rate of climb: 6.6 m/s (1,300 ft/min)

Armament

- Guns:

- 1 × forward-firing 7.92 mm Vz.30 machine gun
- 1 × 7.92 mm vz.30 in a flexible holder

- Bombs: Up to 500 kg (1,102 lb) of bombs
