= Junkers Jumo 210 =

V-12 piston aircraft engine family by Junkers

Jumo 210
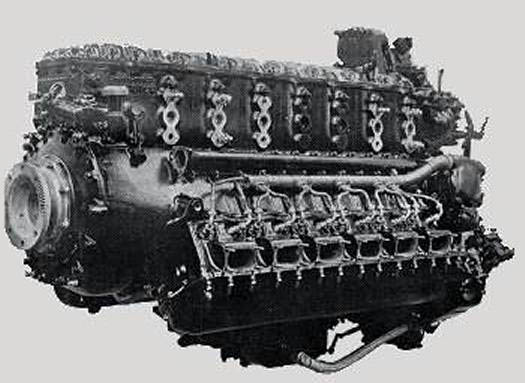
- Jumo 210
- Type: Inverted V12 aero-engine
- Manufacturer: Junkers
- First run: 1932
- Major applications: Messerschmitt Bf 109A-D; Junkers Ju 87A

The Jumo 210 was Junkers' first production inverted V12 gasoline aircraft engine, first produced in the early 1930s. Depending on the version it produced between 610 and 730 PS and can be considered a counterpart of the Rolls-Royce Kestrel in many ways. Although originally intended to be used in almost all pre-war designs, rapid progress in aircraft design quickly relegated it to the small end of the power scale by the late 1930s. Almost all aircraft designs switched to the much larger Daimler-Benz DB 600, so the 210 was produced only for a short time before Junkers responded with a larger engine of their own, the Junkers Jumo 211.

== Design and development ==
The first gasoline-burning aviation power plants that the Junkers Motorenwerke ever built were the L1 and L2 single overhead camshaft (SOHC) liquid-cooled inline-six aviation engines of the early and mid-1920s. Development of this line led up through the L8. All of these were developments of the BMW IIIa inline-six SOHC German World War I aviation engine, which BMW allowed as they were no longer interested in development of their WWI designs. The Junkers L55 engine, however, was the very first V12 layout aviation powerplant of any type created by the Junkers firm, using a pair of the earlier straight-six L5 engines as a basis for an "upright" liquid-cooled V12 aviation engine, as the contemporary BMW VI engine already was.

Development of the Jumo 210 itself started in 1931 under the designation L10. The L10 was Germany's first truly modern engine design, featuring three valves per cylinder, an inverted-V layout, a supercharger as standard equipment, and a cast cylinder block. The 210 was distinct in that the cylinders were machined into a block along with one side of the crankcase, two such parts being bolted together side-by-side to form the engine. Normal construction techniques used three parts, two cylinder blocks and a separate crankcase.

The L10 was first run in static tests on October 22, 1932. With the official formation of the RLM in 1933, numerical engine designations by manufacturer were rationalized with Junkers receiving the "200 block", the L10 becoming the 210. Type approval was achieved in March 1934, and it first flew on July 5, 1934 installed in a Junkers W33. The design had initially aimed for 700 PS, but the prototypes delivered only about 600 PS, so there was some disappointment in the industry. Nevertheless, almost all German aircraft designs of the era were based on the 210, which is why they were so small compared to other countries' efforts.

A Junkers W33 was flown with a 680 hp version of the Jumo 210 on 5 July 1934.

Initial production of the 610 PS (602 hp, 449 kW) Jumo 210A started in late 1934. Further development led in 1935 to the 640 PS (631 hp, 471 kW) 210B and 210C. Both added a new supercharger for improved performance, along with a dump valve to avoid overboost. The B model had its propeller geared at 1:1.55 (prop:engine rpm) for high-speed use, while the C model was geared at 1:1.63 for slower flying speeds. In 1936 the new 670 PS (661 hp, 493 kW) 210D and 210E were introduced, which had the same gearing as the B and C but used a new two-speed supercharger to increase takeoff power and altitude performance.

The Jumo 210G had a direct injection system developed by August Lichte. The Jumo system used a small pump piston positioned beside each of the main cylinders, driven off the crank shaft. The injector used a simple check valve to prevent internal pressure from blowing back into the fuel line, and the pump was timed to inject at the proper point in the intake cycle. Inclusion of the injection system increased takeoff performance by about 20 PS without increasing boost rates and it also reduced fuel consumption. For those reasons most newer German engine types were set up with fuel injection systems. The Jumo 210G was rated at 730 PS (720 hp, 534 kW) and was only available for fast aircraft like the Bf 109 and Bf 110 but not for slow aircraft like the Ju 87.

Further developments were planned as Jumo 210F and 210H, but never built. In 1935 the Jumo 210H, with twin exhaust valves for each cylinder, was used for development of the Jumo 211. The Jumo 210-S was a special development by the DVL with rotary disc valves, as used in KM-8 torpedo engine. Production of the Jumo 210 came to an end in about 1938.

== Applications ==
- Arado Ar 68 - only in Ar 68E
- Focke-Wulf Fw 159
- Focke-Wulf Fw 187
- Heinkel He 112
- Junkers Ju 87 - only in Ju 87A
- Messerschmitt Bf 109 - only in Bf 109 A-D
- Messerschmitt Bf 110 - only in Bf 110 A/B
- Messerschmitt Me 262 V1 - only in first test flight, prototype's BMW 003 axial-flow jet engines failed shortly after takeoff, aircraft brought around and back on the nose-mounted Jumo 210's power alone.

== Specifications (Jumo 210) ==
=== General characteristics ===
- Type: Twelve-cylinder supercharged liquid-cooled inverted vee aircraft engine
- Bore: 124 mm (4.88 in)
- Stroke: 136 mm (5.35 in)
- Displacement: 19.7 L (1,202 in³)
- Length: 1,478 mm (58.19 in)
- Width: 686 mm (27.01 in)
- Height: 960 mm (37.8 in)
- Dry weight: 442 kg (974 lb)

=== Components ===
- Valvetrain: Overhead camshaft, twin inlet and single exhaust valving
- Supercharger: Two-speed centrifugal type supercharger with automatic boost control
- Fuel system: Carburetor
- Fuel type: 87 octane rating gasoline
- Cooling system: Liquid-cooled, ethylene glycol
- Reduction gear: Spur, 1.75:1 or 1.59:1

=== Performance ===
- Power output:
- 508 kW (690 PS or 681 hp) at 2,700 rpm for takeoff
- 515 kW (700 PS or 690 hp) at 2,700 rpm at 1,500 m (4,920 ft), first supercharger speed
- 501 kW (680 PS or 671 hp) at 2,700 rpm at 3,700 m (12,140 ft), second supercharger speed
- Specific power: 26.14 kW/L (0.57 hp/in³)
- Compression ratio: 6.5:1
- Specific fuel consumption: 322-335 g/(kW•h) (0.53-0.55 lb/(hp•h))
- Power-to-weight ratio: 1.17 kW/kg (0.71 hp/lb)

== See also ==
Related development

- Junkers Jumo 211

Comparable engines

- Alfa Romeo 122
- Argus As 410
- de Havilland Gipsy Twelve
- Isotta Fraschini Gamma
- Ranger V-770
- Renault 12R
- Walter Sagitta

Related lists

- List of aircraft engines
- List of aircraft engines of Germany during World War II

== Bibliography ==
- Bingham, Victor (1998). Major Piston Aero Engines of World War II. Shrewsbury, UK: Airlife Publishing. ISBN 1-84037-012-2.
- Christopher, John (2013). The Race for Hitler's X-Planes: Britain's 1945 Mission to Capture Secret Luftwaffe Technology. Stroud, UK: History Press. ISBN 978-0-7524-6457-2.
- Gunston, Bill (2006). World Encyclopedia of Aero Engines: From the Pioneers to the Present Day (5th ed.). Stroud, UK: Sutton. ISBN 0-7509-4479-X.
- Kay, Antony (2004). Junkers Aircraft & Engines 1913–1945. London: Putnam Aeronautical Books. ISBN 0-85177-985-9.
- A History of Aircraft Piston Engines, Herschel Smith
- The Hugo Junkers Homepage-engines section on L-series engines
