= Aero A.304 =

Bomber aircraft by Aero Vodochody

A.304
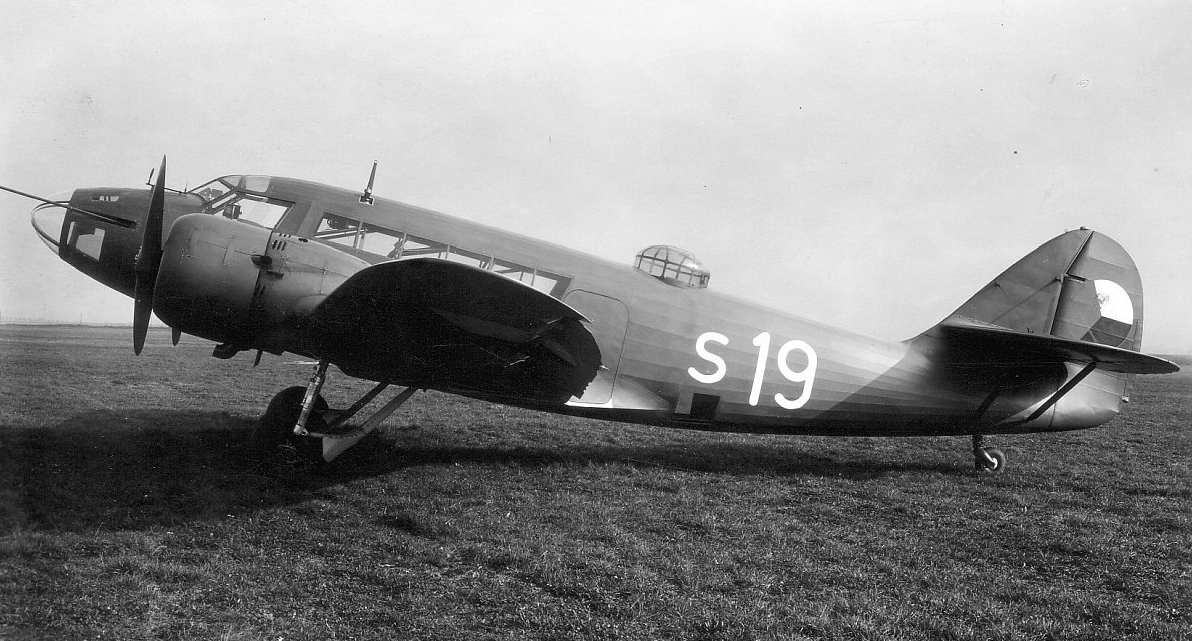

General information
- Type: Bomber
- Manufacturer: Aero Vodochody
- Primary users: Czechoslovak Air Force Germany, Bulgaria
- Number built: 19

History
- First flight: 1937
- Developed into: Aero A.300

The Aero A.304 was a Czechoslovak bomber aircraft that first flew in 1937. It had originally been developed as an airliner, the A.204, but when Aero could not find buyers for the design, it was militarised and successfully marketed to the Czechoslovak Air Force.

== Development ==
In 1936, the Ministry of National Defense (MNO) issued specifications for a new military aircraft, the type III. This mainly concerned the construction of a short-range three-seater reconnaissance and observation aircraft. Letov, Praga, and Aero entered the competition with the Letov Š-50, the Praga E-51 and the Aero A.304. Aero was slightly favored in this competition as the A-204 prototype was purchased by MNO and Aero was already working on MNO-supported projects. The result was that the Antonín Husník-designed 304 was chosen as the winner. The VTLÚ Institute (Military Technical and Aviation Institute) conducted tests with a 304 bearing the designation S 19.

== Description ==
The Aero A.304 was a three- to four-seat twin-engine low-wing aircraft of mixed design with a retractable tail landing gear. The retractable main landing gear had an oil-pneumatic suspension, a leading wheel, with a low-pressure tire, was rotatable about a vertical axis, while the rear wheel was fixed and covered by a fairing. The aircraft had an all-metal fuselage partially covered with canvas and duralumin sheets. The frame was welded from Cr-Mo steel tubes to which a wooden body was attached. The wing of the trapezoidal floor plan with an all-wood frame was covered with load-bearing plywood. The metal frame of the ailerons had a canvas covering. The glazed bow had a duralumin construction. Troops and bulkier objects could be transported in the main cabin of the aircraft which was equipped with full-length windows. Production models were painted a "khaki" color with Czechoslovak insignia on both wing surfaces and on the rudder.

Both Walter Super Castor I-MR engines were housed in engine nacelles and mounted flexibly on tubular steel bearings. These were fitted with all accessories (exhaust headers, NACA annular shrouds, oil coolers, ducts, fire walls) and formed separate, easily removable assemblies. The engines drove wooden propellers with a diameter of 295 cm. Engine starting was done with compressed air supplied from a Walter Garelli compressor. Three duralumin fuel tanks with a total volume of 925 liters were installed in the wings. Oil tanks were equipped with electric heaters and had adjustable circulation circuits.

The aircraft was used by the Czechoslovak Air Force as a reconnaissance/observation aircraft and was used for training bomber crews and for combat duty. It was armed with one 7.92 mm vz. 30 machine gun in the glass bow, one 7.92 mm vz. 30 machine gun in a rotating dorsal turret, and one 7.92 mm vz. 30 machine gun in the floor of the firing compartment. In the light bomber role, it carried 300 kg of bombs. The aircraft was equipped with vz. 26/34 and vz. 29 radios, and an AI-34 or A-II-30 camera.

== Operational history ==
The aircraft were to be delivered to the Czechoslovak Air Force in the amount of 15 pieces and would belong to its most modern machines. Romania and Greece also showed interest in them, but in the fall of 1938 negotiations were interrupted as a result of the Munich Agreement. The first serial A-304.2 aircraft was flown on February 23, 1939. MNO further expanded the original order to 19 units, but these were delivered only after March 15, 1939. The rest of the production models were gradually completed during 1939-40.

After the occupation of Bohemia, Moravia and Silesia by Nazi Germany in March 1939, the planes were captured by the Luftwaffe, which used them in Prostějov (Flugzeugführerschule A/B 71 - FFS A/B 71) for crew training as well as for transporting courier shipments and distinguished persons.A.304s used for transport were modified to seat 6-7 passengers. In 1941, one aircraft, named "Pelikan", was purchased by the Bulgarian Air Force for coastal patrol duty until 1943.

== Operators ==
Bulgaria

- Bulgarian Air Force – (One unit in service)

Czechoslovakia

- Czechoslovak Air Force

Germany

- Luftwaffe – (War plunder from Czechoslovak Air Force)

Slovakia

- Slovak Air Force (1939–1945)

== Specifications (A.304) ==
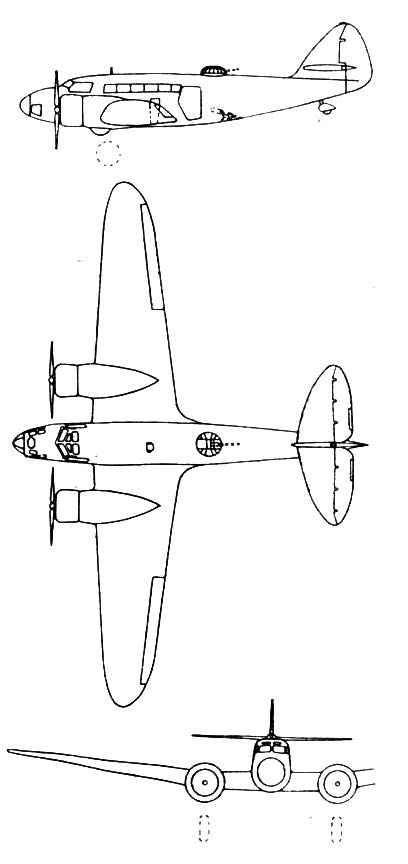
Aero A.304 3-view drawing from L'Aerophile February 1939

Data from War Planes of the Second World War: Volume Seven

General characteristics

- Crew: 3
- Length: 13.21 m (43 ft 4 in)
- Wingspan: 19.2 m (63 ft 0 in)
- Height: 3.4 m (11 ft 2 in)
- Wing area: 45.3 m^{2} (488 sq ft)
- Empty weight: 3,006 kg (6,627 lb)
- Gross weight: 4,364 kg (9,621 lb)
- Powerplant: 2 × Walter Super Castor IMR 9-cyl. air-cooled radial piston engine, 343 kW (460 hp) each

Performance

- Maximum speed: 322 km/h (200 mph, 174 kn) at 1,750 m (5,741 ft)
- Cruise speed: 290 km/h (180 mph, 160 kn)
- Range: 1,199 km (745 mi, 647 nmi)
- Service ceiling: 5,800 m (19,000 ft)
- Rate of climb: 6.75 m/s (1,329 ft/min)

Armament

- Guns:
- 1 × fixed forward-firing 7.92 mm vz-30 machine gun
- 1 × 7.92 mm vz-30 machine gun in dorsal turret
- 1 × 7.92 mm vz-30 machine gun in rearward firing ventral position
- Bombs: Up to 300 kg (660 lb) of bombs

== See also ==
Related development

- Aero A.204
- Aero A.300

Aircraft of comparable role, configuration, and era

- Caproni Ca.311

Related lists

- List of aircraft of World War II
