= Argus As 410 =

1930s German piston aircraft engine

As 410
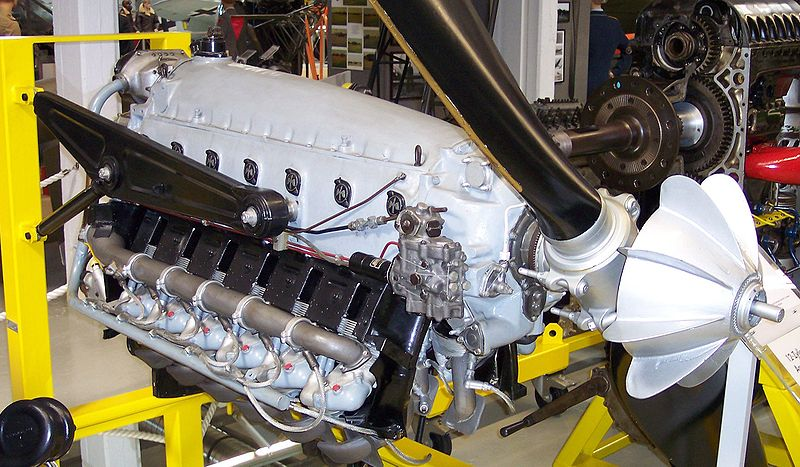
- Preserved Argus As 410
- Type: Piston aircraft engine
- Manufacturer: Argus Motoren
- First run: 1937
- Major applications: Arado Ar 96; Focke-Wulf Fw 189
- Number built: c.28,700
- Developed into: Argus As 411

The Argus As 410 was a German air-cooled inverted V-12 aircraft engine that was first produced by Argus Motoren in 1938.

== Design and development ==
The engine marked a departure from earlier Argus engines in that it had new construction techniques which gave the engine greater operating speeds and power. The engine featured smaller 105 mm × 115 mm cylinders with deep finned steel cooling slots, aluminum heads, geared supercharger, a steel alloy crankshaft and a magnesium alloy crank case. The engine weighed approximately 315 kilograms (694 lb) and produced 465 metric horsepower (459 hp) (342 kW) at 3,100 rpm. Approximately 28,700 engines were produced. A distinctive feature is the finned spinner ahead of the propeller. This is driven by the airflow as a windmill, and used to power the actuator of the variable-pitch propeller. The more powerful and refined Argus As 411 was developed from it.

== Applications ==
- Arado Ar 96
- Argus Fernfeuer
- Focke-Wulf Fw 189
- Henschel Hs 129A
- Pilatus P-2
- Siebel Si 204

== Specifications (Argus 410A) ==
Data from Flugzeug-Typenbuch. Handbuch der deutschen Luftfahrt- und Zubehör-Industrie 1944

=== General characteristics ===
- Type: 12-cylinder air-cooled inverted 60° V engine
- Bore: 105 mm (4.13 in)
- Stroke: 115 mm (4.53 in)
- Displacement: 11.949 L (729.2 cu in)
- Length: 1,585 mm (62.40 in)
- Width: 660 mm (25.98 in)
- Height: 970 mm (38.19 in)
- Dry weight: 315 kg (694 lb) dry, unequipped

336 kg (741 lb) wet, equipped

=== Components ===
- Valvetrain: single exhaust and inlet overhead valves driven by push rods and rockers
- Supercharger: supercharger driven at 8.73:1, rated to 3,000 m (9,800 ft)
- Fuel system: Carburetor
- Fuel type: 80 Octane / 87 Octane at 0.25 bar (4 psi)
- Oil system: pressure fed at 2.5–10 bar (36–145 psi) with a 5 L (1.3 US gal; 1.1 imp gal) capacity
- Cooling system: air

=== Performance ===
- Power output:

- 465 PS (459 hp; 342 kW) for takeoff at 3,100 rpm (1 minute) at sea level
- 355 PS (350 hp; 261 kW) at 2,820 rpm (5 minutes) at sea level
- 330 PS (325 hp; 243 kW) at 2,820 rpm (30 minutes) at sea level
- 315 PS (311 hp; 232 kW) at 2,820 rpm (max. continuous / cruise) at sea level

- Specific power: 38.75 PS/L (0.63 hp/cu in; 28.50 kW/L)
- Compression ratio: 6.4:1
- Specific fuel consumption: 0.2 kg/PSh (0.447 lb/(hp⋅h); 0.272 kg/kWh) at max continuous
- Oil consumption: 0.007 kg/PSh (0.016 lb/(hp⋅h); 0.010 kg/kWh) at max continuous
- Power-to-weight ratio: 1.47 PS/kg (0.66 hp/lb; 1.08 kW/kg)
- B.M.E.P.: 8 atm (8.1 bar; 120 psi)
- Reduction gear 0.66:1

== See also ==
Comparable engines

- Alfa Romeo 122
- de Havilland Gipsy Twelve
- Isotta Fraschini Gamma
- Junkers Jumo 210
- Ranger V-770
- Renault 12R
- Walter Sagitta

Related lists

- List of aircraft engines
