= Avia B-158 =

Avia B.158
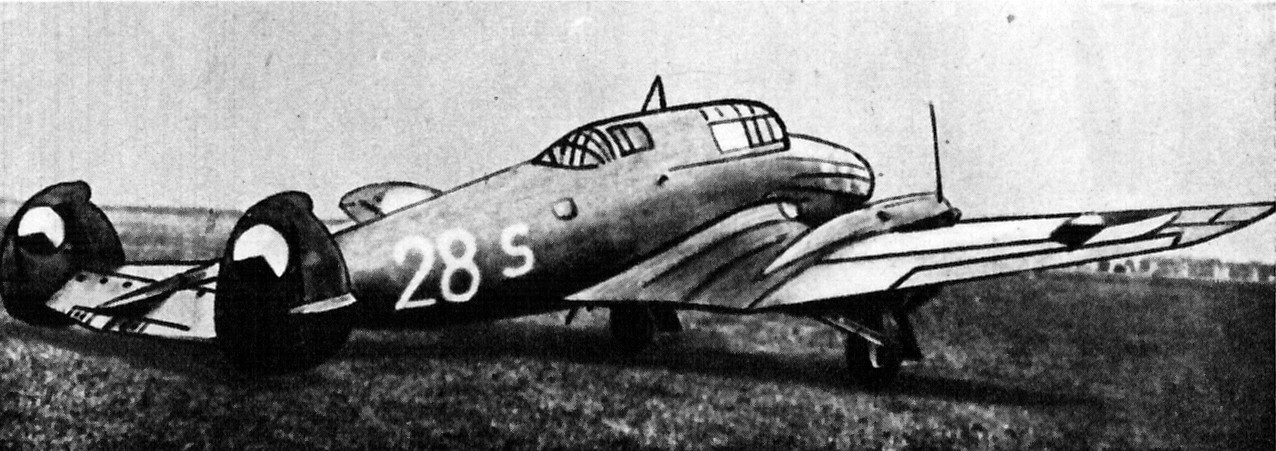

General information
- Type: light bomber
- National origin: Czechoslovakia
- Manufacturer: Avia
- Number built: 1

History
- First flight: 1938

The Avia B.158 was a prototype Czechoslovak twin-engined light bomber aircraft of the 1930s. Only a single example was built and it was abandoned, following the German occupation of Czechoslovakia in March 1939.

== Development and design ==
In 1935, the Czech aircraft company Avia produced the B-58 design for a small twin-engined bomber with a fixed undercarriage, powered by two 313 kW (420 hp) Avia Rk.17 radial engines. This design was abandoned in 1936 and replaced by a more powerful and advanced derivative, the Avia B.158, which was designed to meet a requirement from the Czechoslovak Ministry of National Defense (MNO) for a high performance medium bomber, capable of operation during both day and night, and competing against Aero Vodochody's A.300.

In 1937, Avia started to build a single prototype of the B-158, a three-seat low-winged monoplane with inverted gull-wings, a retractable tailwheel undercarriage and 634 kW (850 hp) Avia (Hispano-Suiza) 12Ydrs engines, making its maiden flight in mid-1938. It was fitted with a twin-tail to give a better field of fire for the dorsal gun position.

While the competing Aero A.300 gave superior performance, neither had entered into production by the time Germany completed its conquest of Czechoslovakia. After testing by the Luftwaffe at their test centre at Rechlin, the prototype B-158 was scrapped in 1940.

== Specifications (B.158) ==
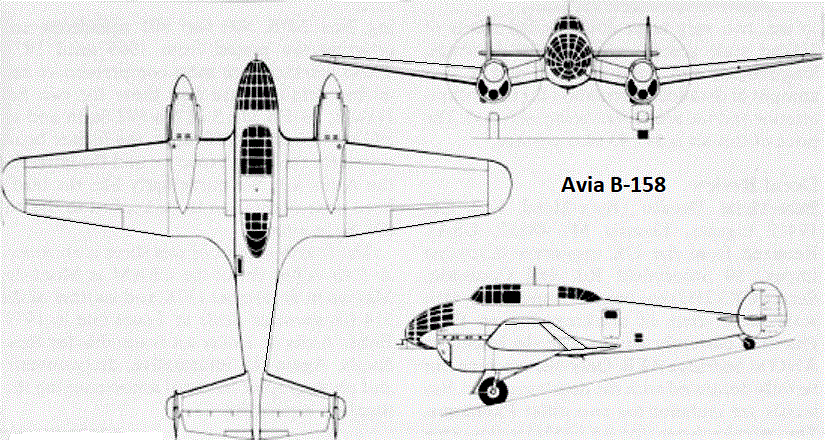
Orthographic line drawing of Avia B-158

Data from Plane Facts:One-off Czech

General characteristics

- Crew: three
- Length: 12.00 m (39 ft 4 in)
- Wingspan: 16.00 m (52 ft 6 in)
- Height: 5.20 m (17 ft 1 in)
- Wing area: 43.00 m^{2} (462.8 sq ft)
- Empty weight: 4,300 kg (9,480 lb)
- Gross weight: 6,600 kg (14,551 lb)
- Max takeoff weight: 7,260 kg (16,006 lb)
- Powerplant: 2 × Avia (Hispano-Suiza) 12Ydrs liquid-cooled V12 engine, 630 kW (850 hp) each

Performance

- Maximum speed: 435 km/h (270 mph, 235 kn)
- Cruise speed: 365 km/h (227 mph, 197 kn)
- Range: 1,100 km (680 mi, 590 nmi)
- Service ceiling: 8,500 m (27,900 ft)
- Rate of climb: 7.00 m/s (1,378 ft/min)

Armament

- Guns: 3×7.92 mm vz.30 (Česká zbrojovka Strakonice) machine guns in nose, dorsal and ventral positions
- Bombs: 1,000 kg (2,200 lb)

== See also ==
Aircraft of comparable role, configuration, and era

- Aero A.300
