= Renault 12R =

1930s French piston aircraft engine

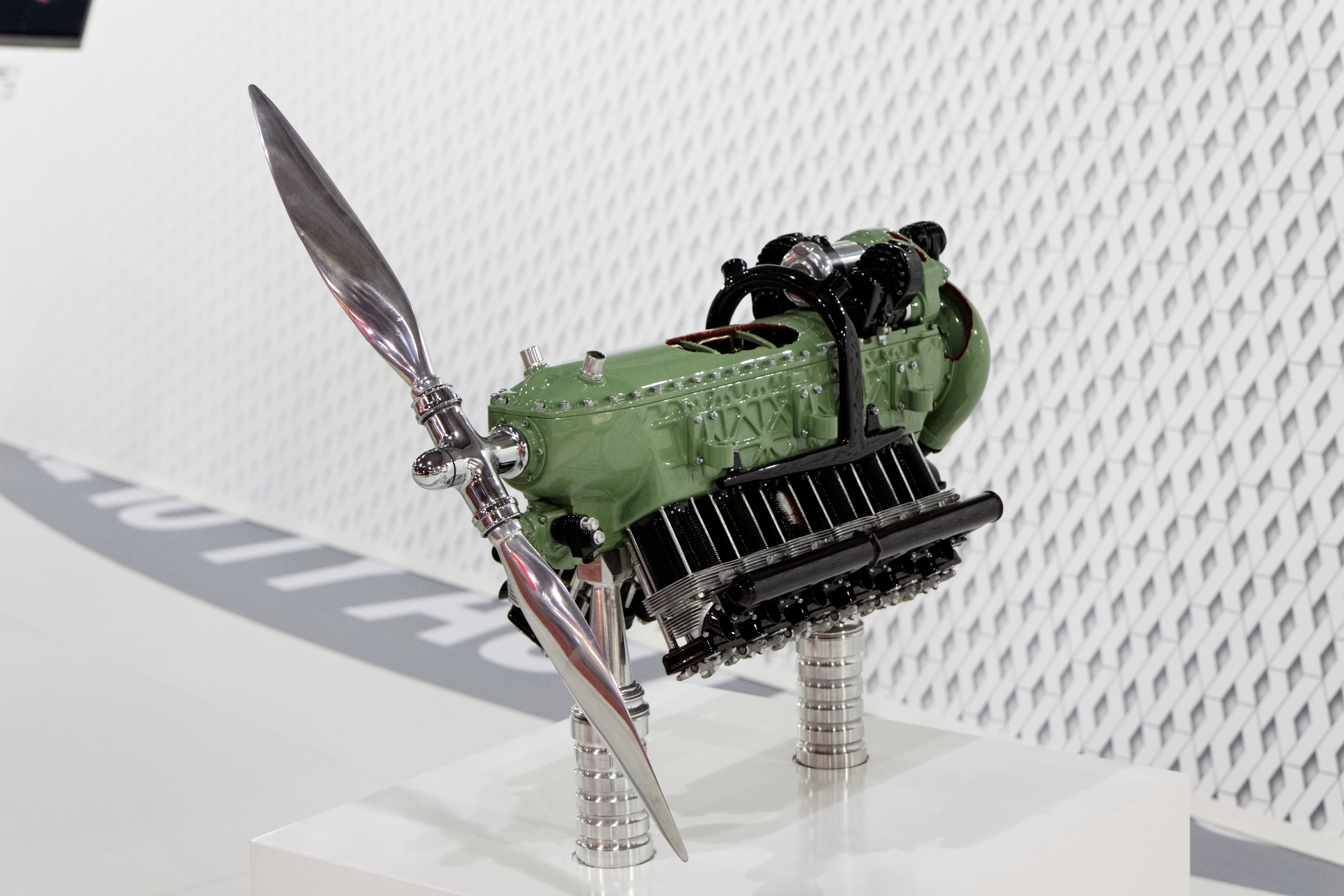
- 12R at Retromobile in 2012
- Type: Air cooled in-line
- National origin: France
- Manufacturer: Renault
- First run: 1935
- Major applications: Caudron C.714
- Number built: 325

The Renault 12R was an air-cooled inverted V12 aircraft engine developed by the French engineering company Renault in the 1930s. The design was based on mounting two 6Q six-cylinder engines on a single crankshaft. In production, the engine was rated between 450 and 500 hp (340 and 370 kW), although a high performance version built for the sole Caudron C.712 racing special produced 730 hp (540 kW). More than one third of production went to power the Caudron C.714 light fighter that fought in the early stages of World War II for the French and Polish Air Forces.

== Design and development ==
The 12R was developed by Renault in the 1930s. The design was derived from the successful Renault Bengali, using the same construction techniques and being of essentially steel construction. It was based on the 4.46, a test engine developed by mounting two 6Q six-cylinder engines on the same crankshaft. The engine retained the bore and stroke of the smaller engine. The cylinders and pistons were made of forged steel and connected in pairs to an eight bearing crankshaft. The crankcase was made of aluminium alloy coated with magnesium. A centrifugal supercharger was mounted to the rear. The engine was produced in both right handed and left handed versions, the difference being the direction of propeller rotation.

Designed to be fitted to a range of aircraft, both civil and military, the engine was originally rated at 450 horsepower (340 kW) when first introduced in 1935. However, the majority manufactured, 290 out of a total production of 325, were the 500 hp (370 kW) 12Rc introduced in 1939. Of these, 120 powered the Caudron C.714 light fighter which served in World War II. In addition to examples of the aircraft ordered the French Air Force, thirty-five were delivered to the Polish Air Force in France and a further six to the Finnish Air Force, although the latter were not used in combat. The most powerful version was the 12R Spécial of 1937 which produced 730 hp (540 kW) at 3250 rpm and powered the single C.712 racing aircraft derived from the fighter.

== Variants ==
Renault 12R
450 hp (340 kW)
Renault 12Rb
470–480 hp (350–360 kW)
Renault 12Rc
500 hp (370 kW)
Renault 12Rm
480 hp (360 kW)
Renault 12Ro
450 hp (340 kW)
Renault 12R-00
500 hp (370 kW) LH rotation
Renault 12R-01
500 hp (370 kW) RH rotation
Renault 12R-02
500 hp (370 kW)
Renault 12R-03
500 hp (370 kW)
Renault 12R-09
500 hp (370 kW)
Renault 12R Spécial
730 hp (540 kW)

== Applications ==
- Caudron C-446
- Caudron C.560
- Caudron C.581
- Caudron C.710
- Caudron C.712
- Caudron C.714
- Caudron C.870
- Dewoitine D.720
- Dewoitine D.750
- Hanriot H.220 (prototype only)
- Romano R.110

== Specifications (12R-00) ==
Data from Aircraft Engines of the World

=== General characteristics ===
- Type: 12-cylinder, air cooled V12 engine
- Bore: 120 mm (4.7 in)
- Stroke: 140 mm (5.5 in)
- Displacement: 19 L (1,159 in^{3})
- Length: 2,072 mm (81.6 in)
- Width: 680 mm (27 in)
- Height: 929 mm (36.6 in)
- Dry weight: 439 kg (968 lb)

=== Components ===
- Valvetrain: 2 x overhead valves per cylinder operated by pushrods
- Supercharger: Single speed centrifugal compressor
- Fuel type: 87 Octane petrol
- Cooling system: Air-cooled

=== Performance ===
- Power output:
  - Take-off: 500 hp (373 kW) at 2,500 rpm
  - Cruise: 300 hp (224 kW) at 2,500 rpm at 4,000 m (13,000 ft)
  - Military: 450 hp (336 kW) at 2,100 rpm at 4,000 m (13,000 ft)
- Compression ratio: 6.4:1
- Fuel consumption: 225 g/(hp•h) (0.50 lb/(hp•h))
- Oil consumption: 10 g/(hp•h) (0.022 lb/(hp•h))

== See also ==
Related development

- Renault 4P
- Renault 6Q

Comparable engines

- Alfa Romeo 122
- Argus As 410
- de Havilland Gipsy Twelve
- Isotta Fraschini Gamma
- Junkers Jumo 210
- Ranger V-770
- Walter Sagitta

Related lists

- List of aircraft engines
