= Aero A.300 =

A.300
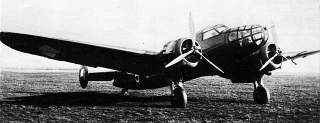
- Aero A.300 in 1938

General information
- Type: Bomber
- Manufacturer: Aero Vodochody
- Primary user: Czechoslovak Air Force

History
- First flight: April 1938
- Developed from: Aero A.304

The Aero A.300 was a Czechoslovak bomber aircraft that first flew in 1938 as a much refined development of the A.304. It was designed by Aero to meet a requirement for a bomber-reconnaissance aircraft for the Czechoslovak Air Force, the Aero A-304 transport/bomber formed the basis for its design. It was a four-seat aircraft powered by two Bristol Mercury IX radial engines . The A-300 was faster than any other Czechoslovak aircraft in the inventory except for the Avia B-35 fighter. Despite showing much promise, development and production of the aircraft was stopped by the German occupation of Czechoslovakia.

== Development and design ==
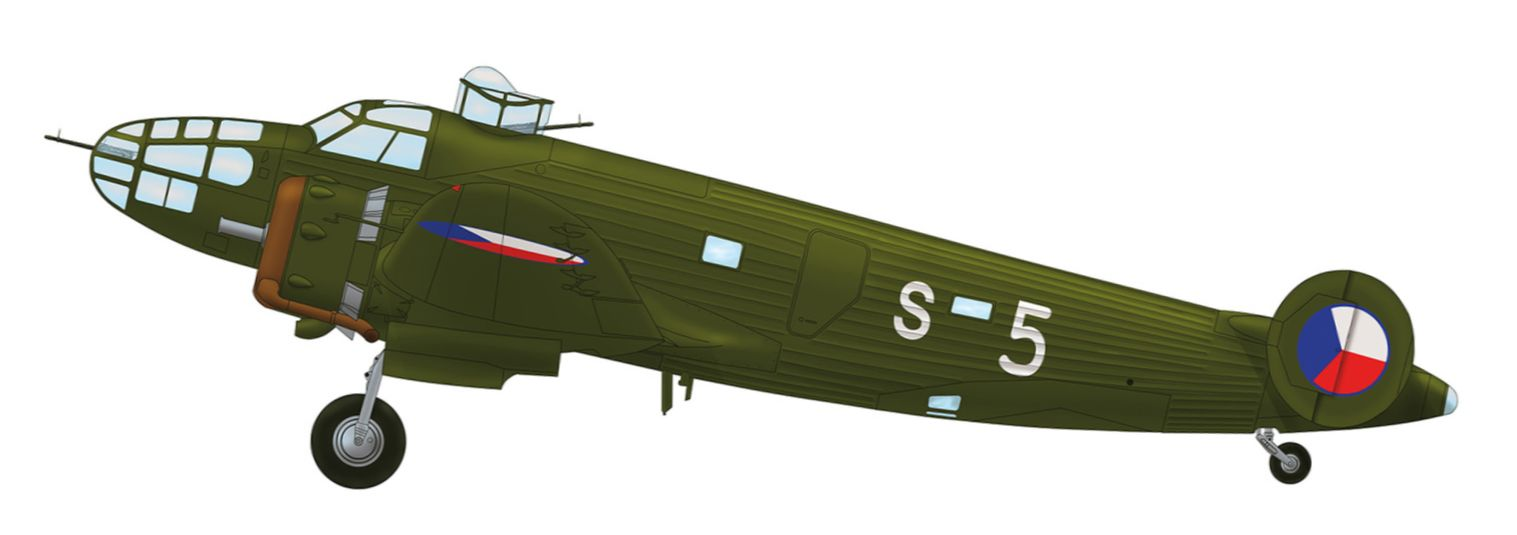
Aero A.300.1, prototype, Summer 1938

In July 1936, the Czech aircraft manufacturer Aero Vodochody offered a concept design for an aircraft to meet a specification issued by the Czechoslovak Ministry of Defence earlier that year. Aero's proposed design, the Aero A-300, was derived from the earlier Aero A.304 bomber-trainer (itself based on the A.204 airliner), and resulted in an order to continue development being placed in 1937, with work beginning on construction of a prototype that year.

The A-300 was a twin-engined, low-wing monoplane of mixed wood and metal construction, with a retractable tailwheel undercarriage, that was intended to carry out both bombing and reconnaissance missions. The wings were of wooden construction, while the fuselage had a chrome-molybdenum steel-tube structure, with a duralumin and wood frame covered by sheet metal making the outer shape of the aircraft. The aircraft was powered by two Bristol Mercury IX radial engines driving three-bladed propellers and rated at 610 kW (820 hp) at 4,400 m (14,400 ft). The aircraft had a crew of four, with a bomb-aimer/observer/gunner sitting in the nose, a single pilot in an enclosed cockpit, a gunner operating a dorsal turret behind the cockpit and a gunner/radio operator in the rear fuselage. Defensive armament consisted of three vz.30 machine guns, (Note: These were improved Czech derivatives of the Vickers Class E aircraft machine guns, themselves an export version of the Vickers Machine Gun.) one in the nose, one in the dorsal turret and one in the rear fuselage. A bombload of 1,000 kg (2,200 lb) could be carried in vertical cells in the fuselage.

Completion of the prototype was slowed by technical problems, and in particular problems with the aircraft's retractable undercarriage. Other issues included that the British-built Mercury engines were not cleared to use the standard Czechoslovak "Bi-bo-li" aircraft fuel (a mixture of 50% gasoline, 20% benzine and 30% ethanol) and had to use imported 87 octane fuel. The prototype made its first flight at Prague–Kbely Airport in April 1938.

The prototype was transferred to the VTLU, the military technical aviation institute, for further testing in August 1938. This was generally successful, and in November that year, the aircraft was declared to have passed testing, and it was decided to order an initial batch of 10–15 aircraft, to be powered by license-built Mercury engines, under the designation B-72. Development was stopped, however, by the German Occupation of Czechoslovakia in March 1939. The prototype was seized by the Germans and was taken to Bremen for study by Focke-Wulf before being scrapped.

== Specifications (A.300) ==
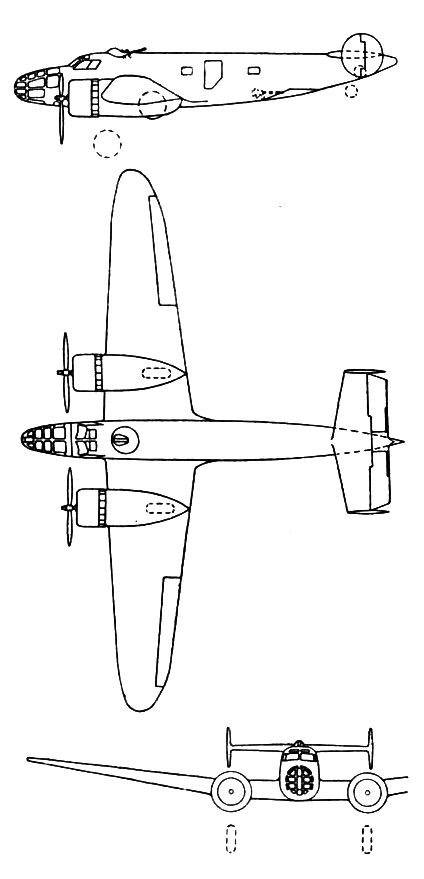
Aero A.300 3-view drawing from L'Aerophile February 1939

Data from Monografie: Aero A-300: Čast II

General characteristics

- Crew: 4
- Length: 13.50 m (44 ft 3 in)
- Wingspan: 19.05 m (62 ft 6 in)
- Height: 3.80 m (12 ft 6 in)
- Wing area: 45.5 m^{2} (490 sq ft)
- Empty weight: 4,337 kg (9,561 lb)
- Gross weight: 6,040 kg (13,316 lb)
- Powerplant: 2 × Bristol Mercury IX 9-cylinder air-cooled radial engines, 610 kW (820 hp) each
- Propellers: 3-bladed, 3.28 m (10 ft 9 in) diameter

Performance

- Maximum speed: 456 km/h (283 mph, 246 kn) at 5,960 m (19,550 ft)
- Range: 2,200 km (1,400 mi, 1,200 nmi) (reconnaissance operations, 5% overload)
- Service ceiling: 9,400 m (30,800 ft)
- Rate of climb: 9.50 m/s (1,870 ft/min) at 4,000 m (13,000 ft)
- Time to altitude: 11 min 35 s to 6,000 m (20,000 ft)

Armament

- Guns:
- 1 × forward-firing 7.92 mm vz.30 (Česká zbrojovka Strakonice) machine gun
- 1 × 7.92 mm vz.30 machine gun in dorsal turret
- 1 × 7.92 mm vz.30 machine gun in rearward-firing ventral position
- Bombs: Up to 1,000 kg (2,200 lb) of bombs

== See also ==
Related development

- Aero A.204
- Aero A.304

Aircraft of comparable role, configuration, and era

- Avia B-158
