= Fokker D.XXIII =

Dutch fighter prototype

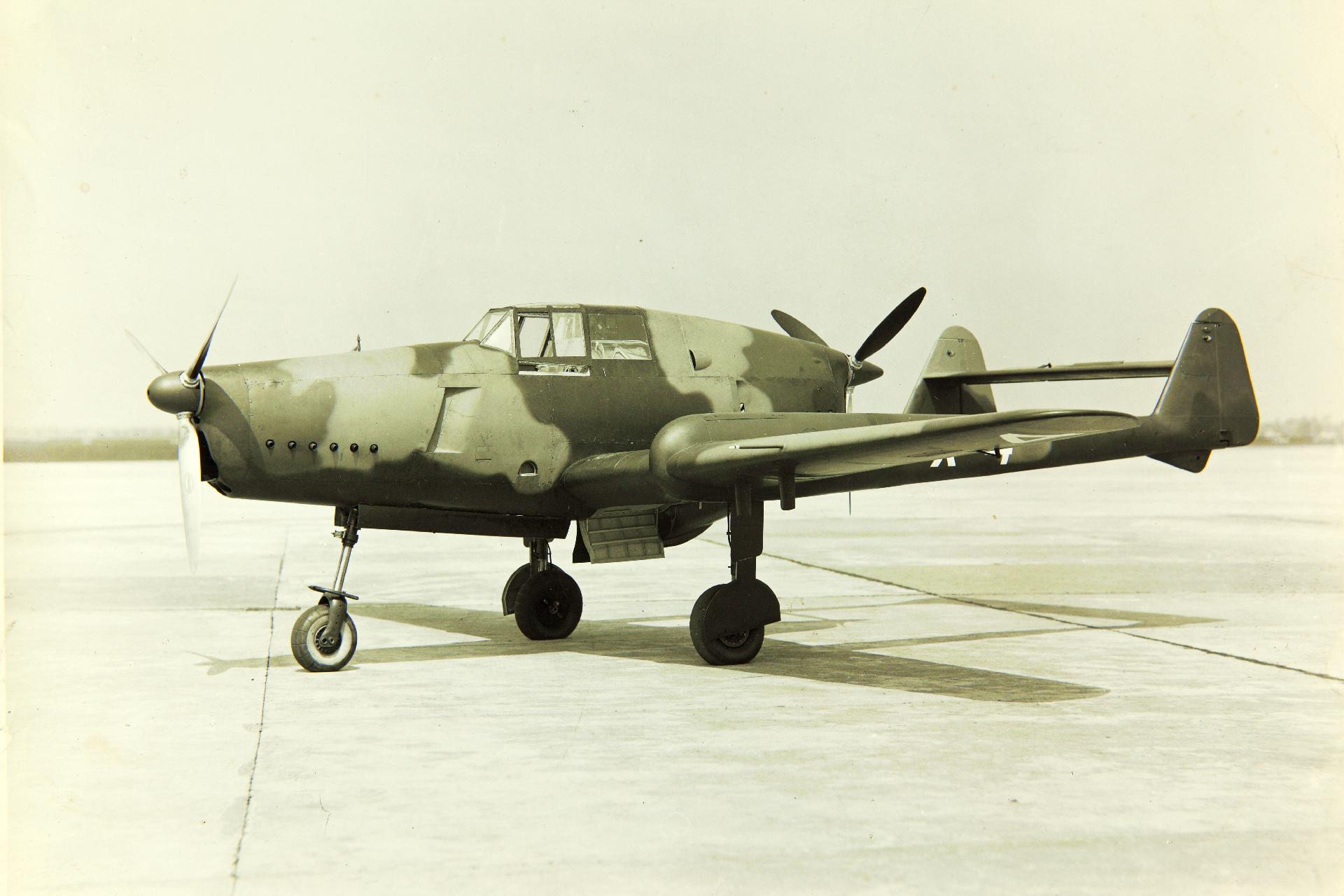

General information
- Type: Single-seat fighter
- National origin: Netherlands
- Manufacturer: Fokker
- Designer: Marius Beeling
- Number built: 1

History
- First flight: 30 May 1939

The Fokker D.XXIII was a Dutch single-seat fighter designed and built by Fokker. Only one aircraft was flown before the country was invaded by the Germans in May 1940.

== Development ==
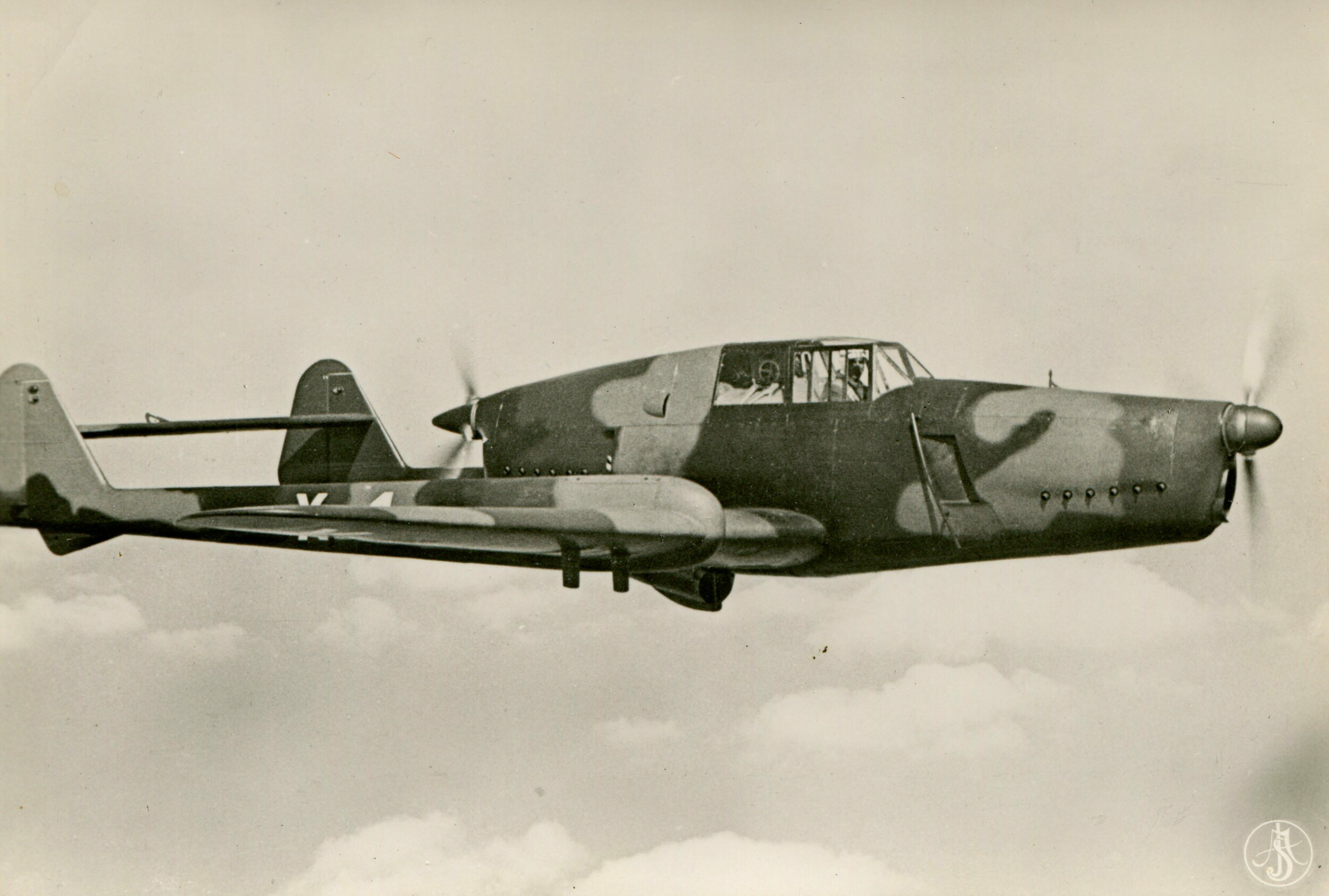
In flight, 1939–1940.

The Fokker D.XXIII was designed as a twin-engined single-seat aircraft. To overcome the problems of asymmetric flight it had a tractor engine at the front and a pusher engine at the rear. The D.XXIII was a cantilever monoplane with the twin tail units on booms. The pilot had an enclosed cockpit in between the tractor and pusher engines and it had a retractable tricycle landing gear.

The prototype first flew on 30 May 1939 powered by two Walter Sagitta I-SR air cooled vee piston engines. The trial flights identified problems with the cooling of the rear engine and general engine performance. It was proposed to use Rolls-Royce or Daimler-Benz engines in the production aircraft. Concerns were also raised about the pilot clearing the rear propeller if he had to bail out and an ejector seat was studied. As a provisional solution, rails were put on both sides of the forward fuselage for the Fokker test pilot, Gerben Sonderman, to use to bail out in an emergency. The aircraft was flown 11 times for a total flight time of less than four hours. The rear fuselage paneling was modified significantly before the last few flights in an attempt to address chronic rear engine cooling problems. On the 11th flight in April, the undercarriage was damaged, and the programme was abandoned in May 1940 when the German forces invaded the Netherlands.

== Specifications ==
Fokker DXXIII

Data from

General characteristics

- Crew: 1
- Length: 10.2 m (33 ft 6 in)
- Wingspan: 11.5 m (37 ft 9 in)
- Height: 3.8 m (12 ft 6 in)
- Wing area: 18.5 m^{2} (199 sq ft)
- Empty weight: 2,180 kg (4,806 lb) equipped
- Max takeoff weight: 2,950 kg (6,504 lb)
- Powerplant: 2 × Walter Sagitta I-SR air-cooled 12-cylinder Vee piston engine, 400 kW (530 hp) each

Performance

- Maximum speed: 525 km/h (326 mph, 283 kn) estimated
- Range: 840 km (520 mi, 450 nmi)
- Service ceiling: 9,000 m (30,000 ft)

Armament

- Guns: two 7.9 mm (0.31in) FN-Browning machine guns and two 13.2 mm (0.52in) FN-Browning machine-guns (not fitted to prototype)

== See also ==
Aircraft of comparable role, configuration, and era

- Dornier Do 335
- Lockheed P-38 Lightning
- Saab 21
- Moskalyev SAM-13
