= De Havilland Gipsy Twelve =

1930s British piston aircraft engine

Gipsy Twelve/Gipsy King
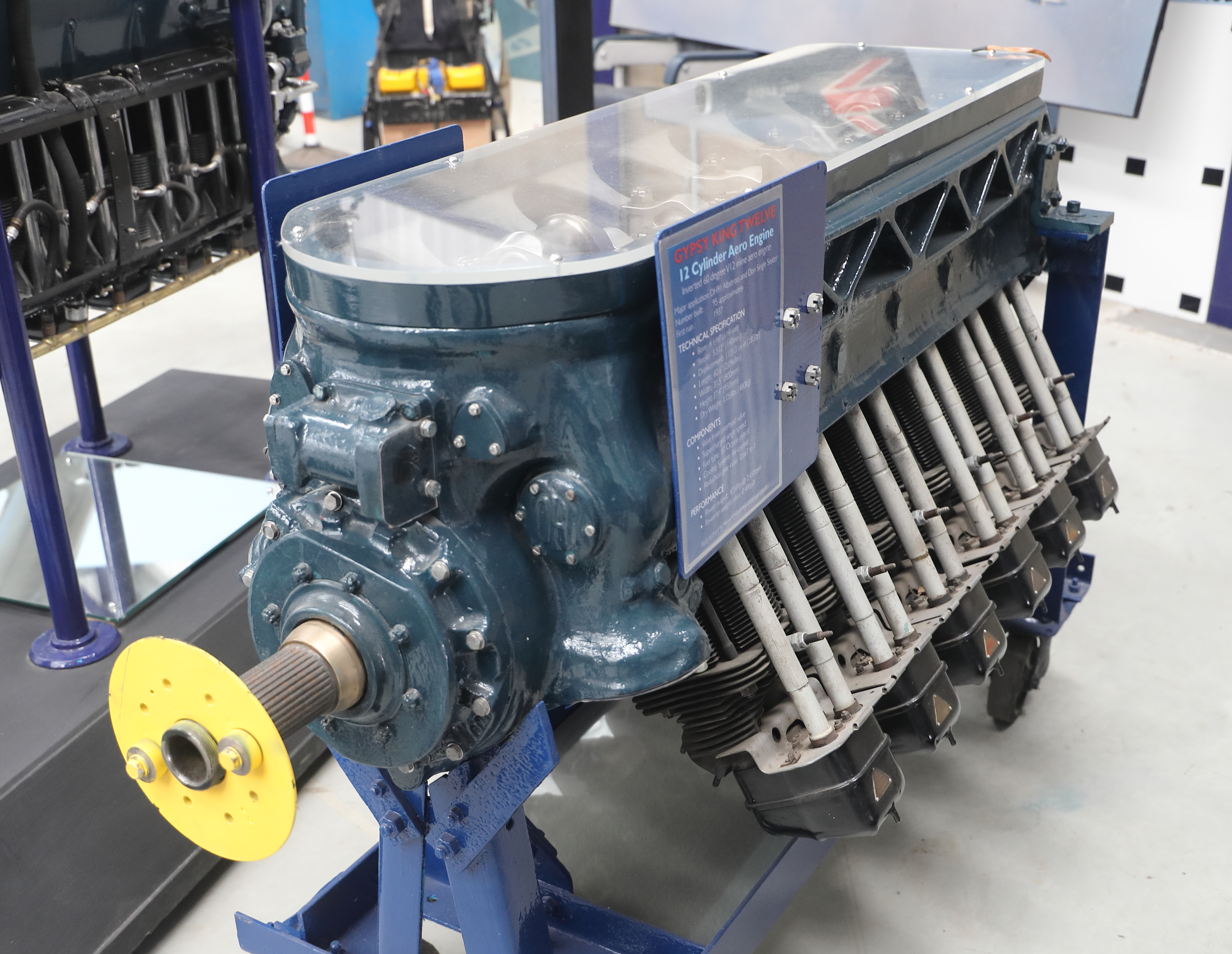
- de Havilland Gipsy King on display at the de Havilland Aircraft Museum
- Type: Piston V-12 inline aero-engine
- Manufacturer: de Havilland Engine Company
- First run: 1937
- Major applications: de Havilland Don de Havilland Albatross
- Number built: 50

The de Havilland Gipsy Twelve was a British aero engine developed by the de Havilland Engine Company in 1937. Approximately 50 were manufactured. It was known as the Gipsy King in Royal Air Force service.

== Applications ==
- de Havilland DH.91 Albatross
- de Havilland DH.93 Don

== Engines on display ==
Preserved de Havilland Gipsy Twelve engines are on public display at the following museums:

- de Havilland Aircraft Museum
- London Science Museum.

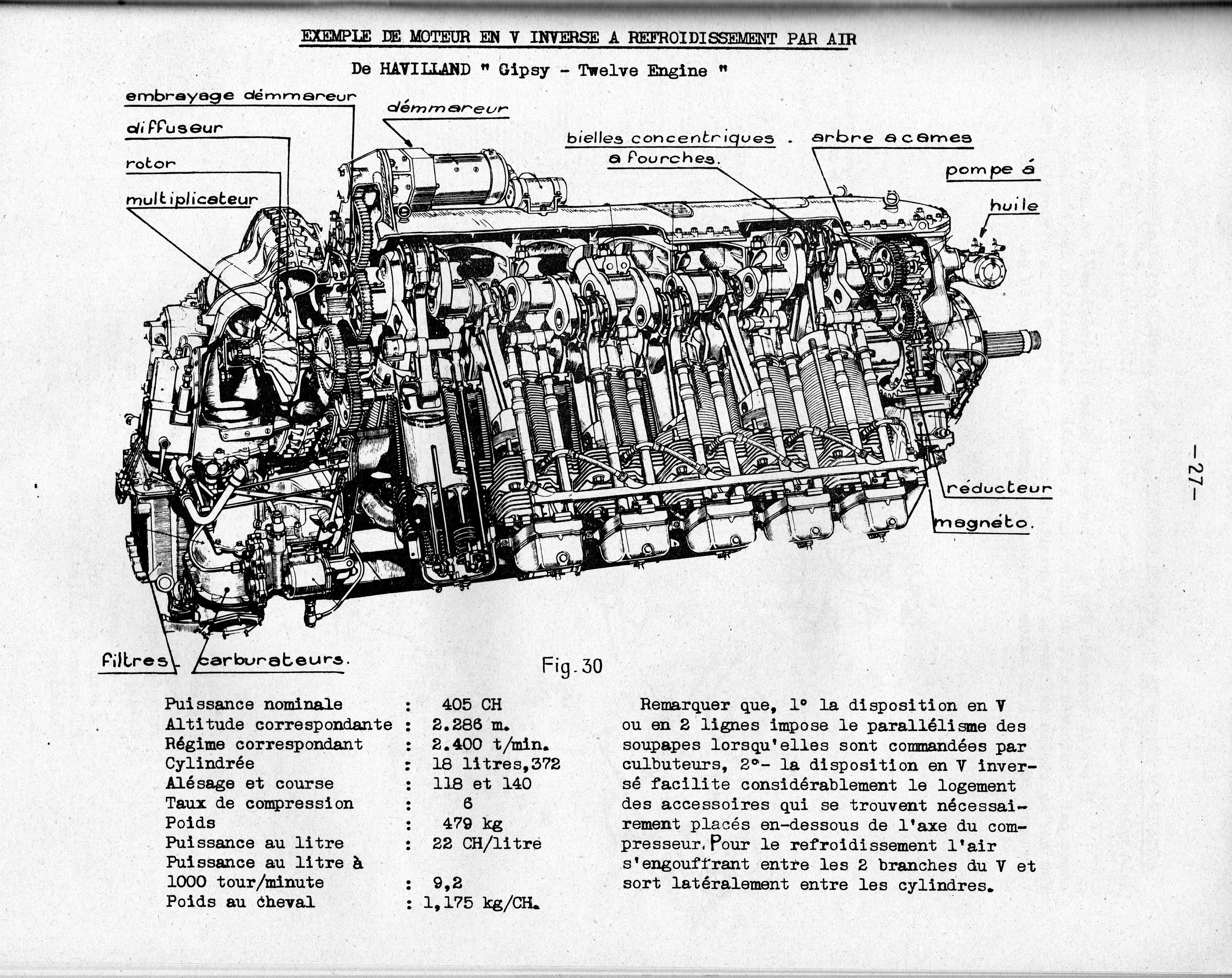

== Specifications (Gipsy King I) ==
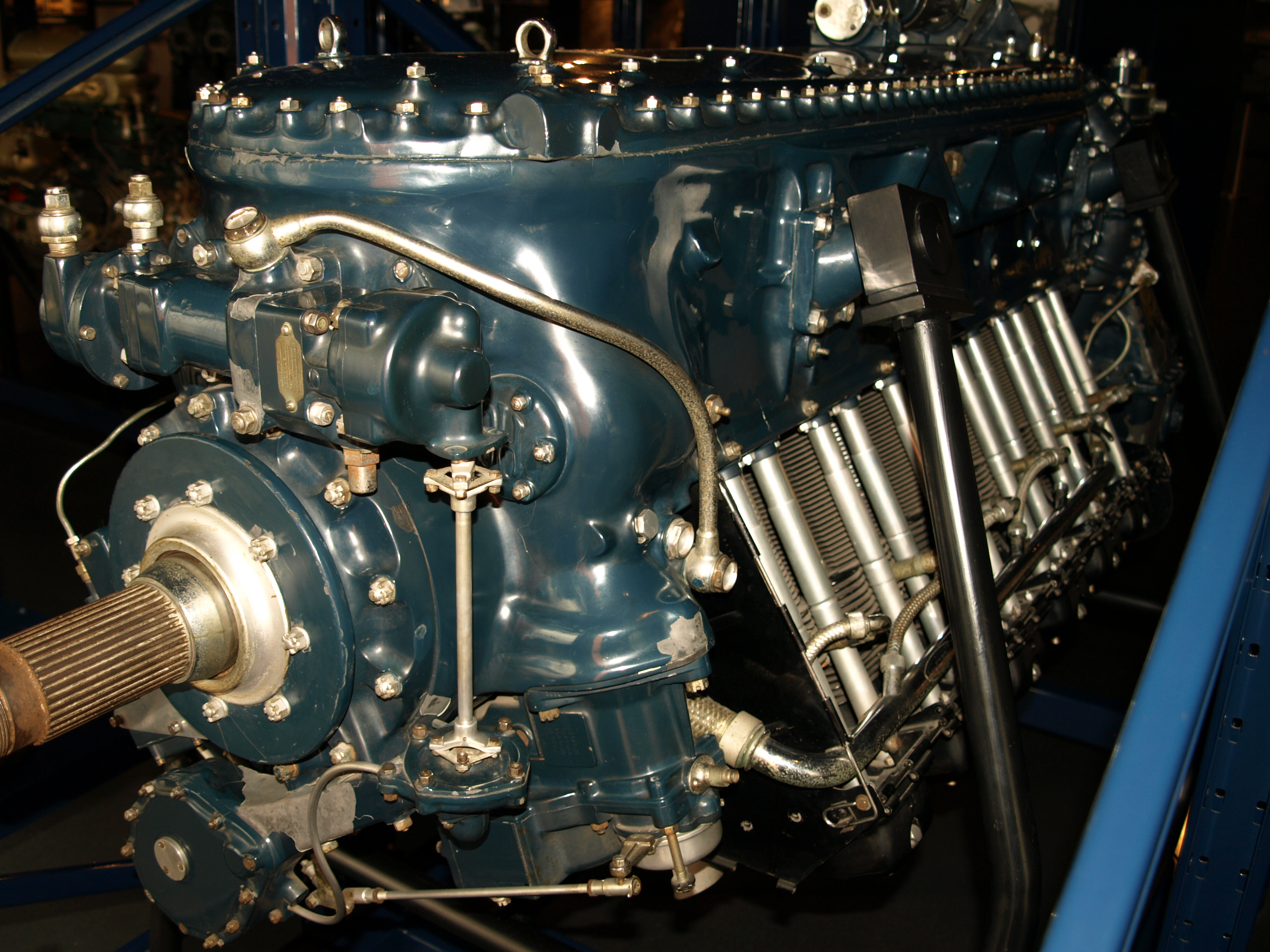
de Havilland Gipsy Twelve at the Science Museum (London)

Data from Lumsden

=== General characteristics ===
- Type: Inverted 60 degree V-12 piston engine
- Bore: 4.646 in (118 mm)
- Stroke: 5.512 in (140 mm)
- Displacement: 1121.3 cu in (18.4 L)
- Length: 82.6 in (2,098 mm)
- Width: 31.5 in (800 mm)
- Height: 37.4 in (950 mm)
- Dry weight: 1,058 lb (480 kg)

=== Components ===
- Valvetrain: Overhead valve
- Supercharger: Single speed
- Fuel type: 87 Octane petrol
- Cooling system: Air cooled
- Reduction gear: Spur geared, reduction ratio 0.667:1

=== Performance ===
- Power output: 425 hp at 2,450 rpm at 0 psi boost (five minutes maximum)
- Compression ratio: 6:1
- Power-to-weight ratio: 0.4 hp/lb

== See also ==
Comparable engines

- Alfa Romeo 122
- Argus As 410
- Isotta Fraschini Gamma
- Junkers Jumo 210
- Ranger V-770
- Renault 12R
- Walter Sagitta

Related lists

- List of aircraft engines
