= Moskalyev SAM-13 =

Military aircraft

SAM-13
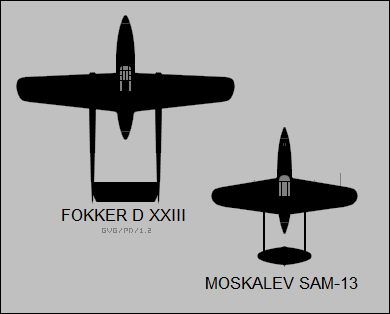

General information
- Type: Twin-engined fighter
- Manufacturer: Voronezhskoye Aktsionernoye Samolyotostroitelnoye Obshchestvo, Voronezh
- Designer: Aleksandr Sergeevich Moskalyev
- Number built: 1

History
- First flight: 1940

The Moskalyev SAM-13 (Russian: Москалев САМ-13) was a prototype twin-engined single-seat low-wing fighter built in the Soviet Union in the 1930s.

== Design and development ==
The design of the SAM-13 followed similar principles to that of the Fokker D.XXIII: to build a lightweight twin-engined fighter with benign single-engined flying characteristics. Moskalyev's design could well have been influenced directly by the D.XXIII, which had been exhibited at the 1938 Paris Salon, differing mainly in size.

The SAM-13 was built largely from wood, with steel fittings in high stress areas and welded steel-tube engine mounts. It was powered by two 220 hp (160 kW) Voronezh MV-6 6-cylinder, air-cooled, inverted in-line engines mounted at the front and rear of the fuselage nacelle, driving 2-bladed, variable pitch propellers.

The sharply tapered wings supported tail-booms which in turn supported the tailplane, elevators, single centrally mounted fin and rudder. The wings also housed the retractable main undercarriage units which retracted inwards. The nose undercarriage was attached to the front engine mounting and retracted rearwards.

Armament of the SAM-13 was intended to be 4x 7.62 mm (0.30 in) ShKAS machine-guns: two in the fuselage top decking firing through the propeller disc, and one at each end of the wing centre-section.

== Operational history ==
First flown in 1940 by Nikolay D Fikson, the SAM-13 proved difficult to handle, requiring long runs to take off and land, with poor climb performance and low ceiling.

After the first flight and subsequent tests, the poor flying qualities of the SAM-13 were being addressed when the Germans invaded during Operation Barbarossa. By Spring 1941 the SAM-13 was undergoing tests at LII, piloted by Mark L Gallai, even being entered for a summer air race. All flying ceased after the German invasion, which prompted destruction of the aircraft.

== Specifications (SAM-13) ==
Data from Soviet X-Planes

General characteristics

- Crew: 1
- Length: 7.85 m (25 ft 9 in)
- Wingspan: 7.3 m (23 ft 11 in)
- Wing area: 9 m^{2} (97 sq ft)
- Empty weight: 754 kg (1,662 lb)
- Gross weight: 1,183 kg (2,608 lb)
- Powerplant: 2 × Voronezh MV-6 6-cylinder air-cooled inverted in-line engines, 160 kW (220 hp) each
- Propellers: 2-bladed variable-pitch propellers, 2.2 m (7 ft 3 in) diameter

Performance

- Maximum speed: 463 km/h (288 mph, 250 kn) at sea level; 680 km/h (420 mph; 370 kn) at 4,000 m (13,000 ft) (estimated)
- Landing speed: 125 km/h (78 mph; 67 kn)
- Range: 1,370 km (850 mi, 740 nmi) estimated
- Service ceiling: 10,000 m (33,000 ft) estimated
- Wing loading: 131 kg/m^{2} (27 lb/sq ft)
- Power/mass: 0.37 kW/kg (0.169 hp/lb)

Armament

- 4x 7.62 mm (0.300 in) ShKAS machine-guns
