= Alfa Romeo 122 =

- Type: Piston aircraft engine
- Manufacturer: Alfa Romeo
- First run: 1941
- Developed from: Walter Sagitta

The Alfa Romeo 122 was a 12-cylinder inverted-V aircraft engine produced in 1941 by Alfa Romeo Milano as a licence-built Czechoslovak Walter Sagitta, featuring a single-speed supercharger. The 122 R.C.38 major production variant had a reduction gearbox, single stage supercharger and rated altitude of 3,800 m (12,500 ft).

== Specifications ==
=== General characteristics ===
- Type: 60° 12-cylinder inverted V12 air-cooled engine
- Bore: 118 mm (4.6 in)
- Stroke: 140 mm (5.5 in)
- Displacement: 18.6 L (1,135.04 cu in)
- Length: 1,790 mm (70.5 in)
- Width: 725 mm (28.5 in)
- Height: 781 mm (30.7 in)

=== Components ===
- Supercharger: Centrifugal compressor, diameter 210 mm (8.3 in)
- Cooling system: Air cooling

=== Performance ===
- Power output: 368 kW (493 hp) at 3,800 m (12,500 ft)

== See also ==
Related development

- Walter Sagitta

Comparable engines

- Argus As 410
- Argus As 411
- de Havilland Gipsy Twelve
- Isotta Fraschini Gamma
- Junkers Jumo 210
- Ranger V-770
- Renault 12R
- Walter Sagitta

Related lists

- List of aircraft engines

== Bibliography ==
- Archivio Storico Alfa Romeo - Volume II. Torino, novembre 1998.
