= Avia 51 =

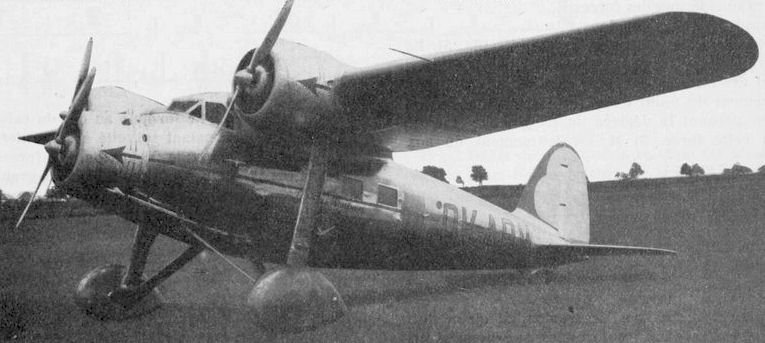

General information
- Type: Passenger commercial transport
- National origin: Czechoslovakia
- Manufacturer: Avia
- Designer: Robert Nebesář
- Primary user: CLS
- Number built: 3

History
- First flight: 1933

The Avia 51 was a trimotor monoplane commercial transport. It was designed by Robert Nebesář and built by the Czechoslovak aircraft manufacturer Avia. The type proved to be uneconomical in use and thus only three aircraft were ever built.

The Avia 51 was designed for the Czech national airlines Československé státní aerolinie (ČSA). It was built to carry up to six passenger within its cabin and was operated by a crew of two from its cockpit. The aircraft was furnished with a high-mounted cantilever wing and a fixed tailwheel landing gear arrangement. While the type did enter use on the Berlin-Prague-Vienna route, but the Avia 51 was found to be uneconomical due to its small passenger capacity. One of these was subsequently operated for a time by the Spanish Republican Air Force during the Spanish Civil War.

== Design ==
The Avia 51 was a trimotor monoplane transport aircraft of a relatively conventional appearance. The aircraft's construction was entirely composed of either metal or fabric, except for some of the decorative fittings present in the cabin. Specifically, duralumin and high-tensile steel were the primary metals used; various protective measures to prevent or minimise corrosion were used, including cadmium plating, painting, and lacquering. The aircraft possessed a relatively high wing loading (19.3 lb./sq.ft.) and thus also had a somewhat high landing speed; a factor that was aggravated by its lack of air brakes.

It was equipped with a cantilever wing that used conventional twin-spar construction. These spars, which were composed of duralumin, worked in combination with a series of booms and ties to form an N-shaped girder. These spar booms comprised a U-shaped strip that had a corrugated covering strip to close off its open side. The rounded side of the booms faced inwards rather than outwards, despite this arrangement placing the rivets closer to the area subjected to the maximum amount of stress, but made the attachment of the ties potentially easier. The wing ribs were also composed of duralumin. Prise-type ailerons were present, the framework for which comprised duralumin tubes; various other elements, including the pin, rudder, stabilizer, and elevator, also used duralumin construction. The hinges for both the rudder and elevator used the setback Handley Page style.

The fuselage of the aircraft was streamlined, which contributed to the aircraft achieving a relatively low minimum drag coefficient for a trimotor. This fuselage featured duraluminium semi-monocoque construction. The support areas were relatively small, comprising six primary longerons with intermediate stringers, while closely spaced double-walled bulkheads were present with lighter formers positioned between them. The fuselage had an oval-shaped cross-section. The exterior covering was composed of sheet duralumin, which was riveted to the longerons, stringers and double-walled bulkheads, but not to the intermediate formers.

A divided type of undercarriage was typically fitted. It possessed lengthy telescopic legs with an oleo-pneumatic arrangement that ran to the forward spar of the wing. These elongated legs gave the aircraft that a favourable ground angle while also permitting a lengthy range of travel for the wheels. The undercarriage had a relatively wide wheel track, and the wheels were outfitted with brakes. Alternatively, the Avia 51 was designed so that it could be fitted with floats if so desired by the operator.

It was powered by a total of three Avia Rk.12 radial engines, each of which were rated to produce up to 200 hp. Two of these engines were faired into the leading edges of the wing while the last one was centrally positioned on the aircraft's nose. All three engines were completely enclosed in cowlings. Each engine was mounted upon on structures composed of welded steel tubing and could be easily detached as complete units; rubber bushes were interposed to absorb vibrations from the engines. Two of these engines could provide sufficient power for the aircraft to maintain level flight, reducing the likelihood of a forced landing in the event of a single engine failure. Each engine drove a metal twin-bladed variable-pitch propeller. Compressed air was used to start the engines; an onboard compressor was driven by the central engine. Fuel was carried in two tanks, each accommodating up to 16.5 gallons, that were constructed of soldered brass and located within the wing between the spars. Fuel was supplied to the engines via engine-driven pumps. The oil tanks, which a capacity of 5 gallons each, supplied the adjustable oil coolers.

The passenger cabin could be outfitted with relatively luxurious fittings, although it lacked sufficient height to permit a person of average height to stand up straight (5 ft 1in). Comfortable seats, with headrests and deep cushions, could seat up to five passengers. Adjustable ventilators were present at each seat; these were supplied with air drawn from the wingroot via ducting. Cabin heating was drawn from the Exhaust manifold of the central engine. Other features included the presence of a separate lavatory compartment along with a total of three compartments (one forward, one within the cabin, and one aft) for the stowage of both luggage and air mail. A door in the front wall of the cabin joined with the cockpit, which was typically operated by a crew of two; the chief pilot occupied the left seat while the second pilot, who was also the radio operator, sat in the right seat. The side windows of the cockpit could be opened while a skylight and mirror were present to improve upwards and rearwards visibility. Relatively conventional instrumentation was provided as standard; specialist apparatus could be fitted if the operator sought to conduct either night flying or blind flying.

== Operational history ==
During the test flight programme, the Avia 51 reportedly fulfilled all of the design team's estimates across all categories.

The Avia 51 entered service on the Berlin-Prague-Vienna route, but the type quickly proved to be uneconomical to operate as a consequence of its relatively small passenger capacity. During 1937, all three aircraft were sold to the Estonian government. One subsequently appeared to have been operated by the Spanish Republican Air Force during the Spanish Civil War. It was further alleged that the other two aircraft had also been intended for Spanish service, but had been lost at sea as a result of the freighter carrying them to Bilbao being sunk.

== Operators ==
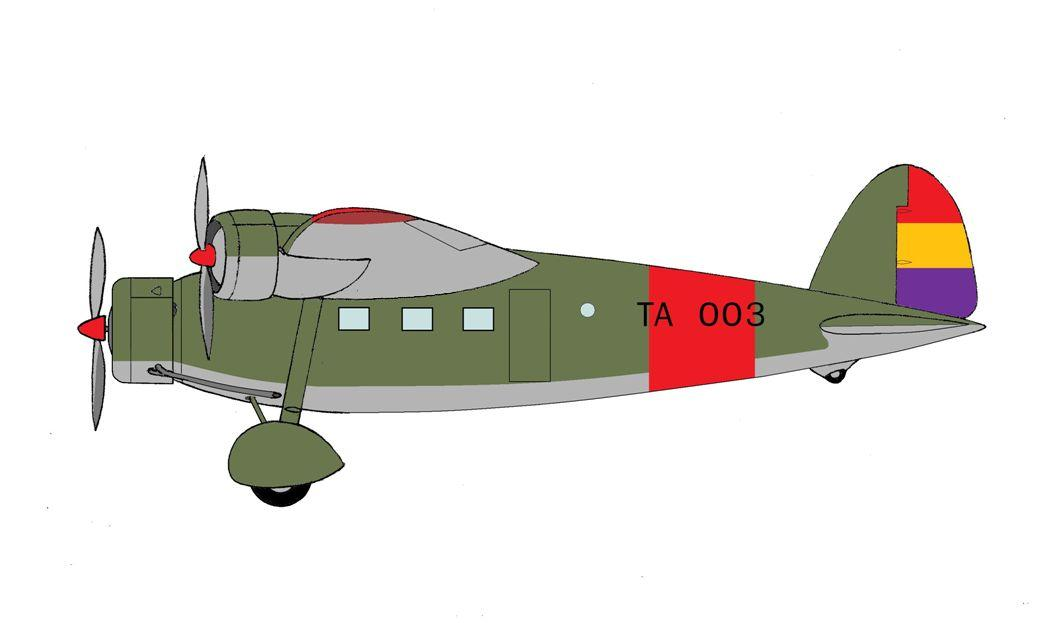
Avia 51 of the Spanish Republican Air Force

Spain

- Spanish Republican Air Force

== Specifications ==
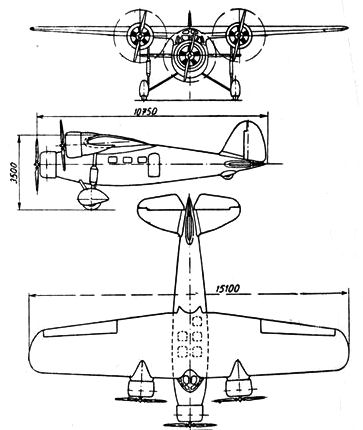
Avia 51 3-view drawing from L'Aerophile December 1933

Data from The Illustrated Encyclopedia of Aircraft (Part Work 1982-1985), The Avia 51 - The Czech high-performance passenger plane

General characteristics

- Crew: two
- Capacity: six
- Length: 10.75 m (35 ft 3 in)
- Wingspan: 15.10 m (49 ft 6 in)
- Height: 3.50 m (11 ft 6 in)
- Wing area: 38.00 m^{2} (409.0 sq ft)
- Empty weight: 2,990 kg (6,592 lb)
- Max takeoff weight: 3,750 kg (8,267 lb)
- Powerplant: 3 × Avia Rk.12 seven-cylinder air-cooled radial engine, 150 kW (200 hp) each

Performance

- Maximum speed: 264 km/h (164 mph, 143 kn)
- Cruise speed: 230 km/h (140 mph, 120 kn)
- Range: 780 km (480 mi, 420 nmi)
- Service ceiling: 4,000 m (13,000 ft)
- Rate of climb: 4.2 m/s (820 ft/min)
- Lift-to-drag: 10.2
- Wing loading: 94 kg/m^{2} (19.3 lb/sq ft)

== See also ==
Related lists

- List of aircraft of the Spanish Republican Air Force
