= Caudron C.560 =

1930s French aircraft

C.560 Rafale II

General information
- Type: Racing and sports aircraft
- National origin: France
- Manufacturer: Société des Avions Caudron
- Designer: Marcel Riffard

History
- First flight: 1935

The Caudron C.560 Rafale II (transl. Gust) was a French competition aircraft built in the mid-1930s. It was intended to participate in the Coupe Deutsch de la Meurthe race of 1935 and was powered by a 450 hp (340 kW) Renault 12R inverted V-12.
