= Aero A.204 =

General information
- Type: Airliner
- Manufacturer: Aero Vodochody
- Designer: A. Husnick
- Status: Did not enter production
- Primary user: Czech Airlines

History
- First flight: 1936

The Aero A.204 was a Czechoslovak airliner that flew in prototype form in 1936. It was developed specifically for ČSA, but much to Aero's surprise and disappointment, the national airline selected a British product instead, the Airspeed Envoy. Unable to find a customer, Aero began to develop a military version instead, as the A.304.

Whilst Czechoslovakia was under occupation by Nazi Germany, Aero manufactured the Siebel Si 204 under licence. Similar in configuration to the A.204, these two aircraft are occasionally confused, but the correct Czech designation for the Siebel product is C-3.

== Specifications ==
Data from Les Ailes December 1936

General characteristics

- Crew: Two
- Capacity: Eight passenger
- Length: 13 m (42 ft 8 in)
- Wingspan: 19 m (62 ft 4 in)
- Height: 3 m (9 ft 10 in)
- Wing area: 46 m^{2} (500 sq ft)
- Empty weight: 2,850 kg (6,283 lb)
- Gross weight: 4,300 kg (9,480 lb)
- Fuel capacity: 630 L (140 imp gal; 170 US gal)
- Powerplant: 2 × Walter Pollux IIR-2 9-cylinder radial, 270 kW (360 hp) each geared down 2:3
- Propellers: 2-bladed wood

Performance

- Maximum speed: 320 km/h (200 mph, 170 kn) at 1,400 m (4,600 ft)
- Cruise speed: 286 km/h (178 mph, 154 kn) at 1,400 m (4,600 ft)
- Range: 900 km (560 mi, 490 nmi)
- Service ceiling: 5,800 m (19,000 ft) practical
- Take-off distance: 145 m (476 ft)
- Landing distance: 240 m (790 ft)

== See also ==
Related development

- Aero A.304
- Aero A.300

Aircraft of comparable role, configuration, and era

- Airspeed Envoy

Related lists

- List of airliners
