= Isotta Fraschini Gamma =

Air cooled aircraft engine developed in the 1930s

Gamma
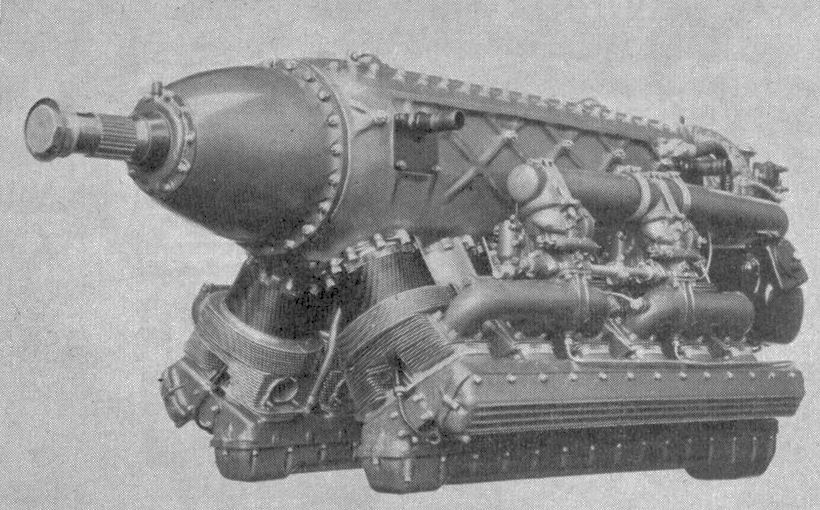
- Isotta Fraschini Gamma R.C.35
- Type: Air cooled V12 aircraft engine
- National origin: Italy
- Manufacturer: Isotta Fraschini

The Isotta Fraschini Gamma was an air cooled aircraft engine developed by the Italian engineering company Isotta Fraschini in the 1930s. It was an inverted V12 rated at over 500 hp (373 kW). Produced in small numbers for one-off aircraft, including the Ambrosini SAI.107 and Caproni Vizzola F.5 Gamma fighter trainer prototypes, it was developed into the more powerful and more numerous Delta.

== Design and development ==
The Gamma was an air cooled inverted V engine with 12 cylinders arranged in two banks, each cylinder of bore 125 mm (4.9 in) and stroke 130 mm (5.1 in). Isotta Fraschini produced the Gamma in small numbers during World War II at a rating of about 500 hp (373 kW).

The engine formed the basis for a number of other aircraft engines produced by the company. The more powerful Delta was developed as a larger complement to the Gamma. While the Beta straight-six engine was essentially one half of the engine, the Zeta mated two Gamma engines to a common crankshaft to create an X24 engine. The larger engines shared with the Gamma a problem cooling the rearmost cylinders which impeded development.

In 1942, there was speculation in the UK about a powerful Italian engine called the Isotta Fraschini Gamma that produced 1,700 hp (1,268 kW) at 2200 rpm for take-off and had a displacement of 55.562 L (3,391 in^{3}) with a bore of 195 mm (7.7 in) and stroke of 192.5 mm (7.58 in).

== Variants ==
Gamma R.C.15
540 hp (403 kW) at 1,500 m (4,921 ft)
Gamma R.C.35
515 hp (384 kW) at 3,500 m (11,483 ft)

== Applications ==
- Ambrosini SAI.107
- Caproni Vizzola F.5 Gamma
- Savoia-Marchetti SM.86

== Specifications ==
Data from Pearce, 2017 and Wilkinson, 1945

=== General characteristics ===
- Type: 12-cylinder air cooled 60° inverted V aircraft piston engine
- Bore: 125 mm (4.9 in)
- Stroke: 130 mm (5.1 in)
- Displacement: 19.1 L (1,166 in^{3})

=== Components ===
- Valvetrain: Two valves per cylinder with dual overhead camshafts
- Supercharger: Single stage, 10.34:1
- Fuel type: 87 octane petrol
- Cooling system: Air-cooled

=== Performance ===
- Power output:
  - (Take-off) 550 hp (410 kW) at 2200 rpm
  - (Military) 580 hp (433 kW) at 2730 rpm at 4,000 m (13,000 ft)
- Specific power: 21.5 kW/L (0.47 hp/in³)
- Compression ratio: 6.5:1

== See also ==
Related development

- Isotta Fraschini Beta
- Isotta Fraschini Delta
- Isotta Fraschini Zeta

Comparable engines

- Alfa Romeo 122
- Argus As 410
- de Havilland Gipsy Twelve
- Junkers Jumo 210
- Ranger V-770
- Renault 12R
- Walter Sagitta

Related lists

- List of aircraft engines
