= Savoia-Marchetti SM.85 =

Italian monoplane dive bomber

SM.85

General information
- Type: Dive-bomber
- Manufacturer: Savoia-Marchetti
- Primary user: Regia Aeronautica
- Number built: 34

History
- First flight: 19 December 1936
- Retired: 1940

The Savoia-Marchetti SM.85 was an Italian monoplane dive bomber and ground-attack aircraft that served in small numbers in the Regia Aeronautica at the beginning of World War II. They were soon replaced in service by the Junkers Ju 87.

== Design and development ==
The SM.85 was part of a programme by the Regia Aeronautica to produce a twin-engine monoplane dive bomber based on the theories developed over the previous 20 years by the American General Billy Mitchell, that were enthusiastically adopted by Colonel Amedeo Mecozzi (who also developed the Breda Ba.64 and its derivatives) for attack aircraft.

The resulting aircraft, constructed of wood, had a wing set in an upper-middle configuration, a rectangular cross-section fuselage, retractable undercarriage and a fixed tail wheel, and was powered by two Piaggio P.VII C.35 engines. The wings, made totally of wood, had three longerons, with fabric covering. The aircraft was designed to give the pilot the best possible forward view, with a transparent panel built into the cockpit floor.'

The SM.85's useful payload was 1,150 kg (2,540 lb), including the possibility of fitting a 12.7 mm (0.5 in) machine gun with 300-500 rounds. The aircraft was capable of also using its flaps as airbrakes for diving attacks, a notable characteristic of this aircraft. The bomb load was carried in a parallelogram-shaped section mounted under the fuselage. The SM.85 was capable of carrying a 500 kg/1,100 lb bomb (or an 800 kg/1,760 lb bomb, the heaviest weapon in the Italian aviation arsenal, but only on very short range missions).

At maximum payload, with a 4,000 kg (8,820 lb) takeoff weight, the climb rate was 20 min to 5,000 m (16,400 ft), but freshly started engines did not produce their theoretical maximum power and the aircraft was usually much slower than this. The takeoff needed 433 m (1,421 ft), and the landing 415 m (1,362 ft). Ceiling was 6,000-6,500 m (19,690-21,330 ft) and 756–827 km (470-514 mi) range. Maximum speed was 367 km/h (288 mph) at 4,000 m (13,123 ft). The fuel capacity was 1,078 L (285 US gal), contained in four self-sealing fuel tanks. At the maximum payload with a 500 kg (1,100 lb) bomb, it was incapable of taking off with a full fuel load (around 730 kg/1,610 lb), so this was used only on ferrying missions.

The first prototype was tested in December 1936, and in spite of its insufficient speed and the disappointing rates of climb, the Regia Aeronautica felt there was sufficient room for development and ordered the SM.85 into production. Despite some improvements, critical deficiencies continued to be experienced during test flights by the Reparto Sperimentale Volo a Tuffo. These revised aircraft were disappointing as dive bombers in almost every aspect, with the most serious problems encountered being frequent uncontrollable spins, extremely slow climb rate after a dive, and instability during the dive.

Production of the aircraft was halted, and the 34 produced up to that time were organised as 96° Gruppo Tuffatori (96th Independent Dive-Bomber Group).

Although the SM.85 programme could be viewed as Savoia-Marchetti's worst mistake in wartime, this dive bomber was considered a threat by the British. They considered the possibility of suicide missions made with this aircraft against their ships, having mistaken the meaning of tuffatori.

The SM.85 was essentially made into a "training dive-bomber" as it was never really suited to being an operational machine. Its engines were not powerful enough to achieve a satisfactory performance, and even when the SM.86 was developed, with much improved engines, it was too late. One SM.85 was modified into a two-seat trainer version. This was developed within a programme that lead to the advanced SM.93, another interesting and unusual aircraft, with high-speed performance and a prone pilot position. Development began too late to be put into production, as with almost all other Savoia-Marchetti "series 90s" projects. In retrospect, the SM dive bombers were a failure.

== Operational history ==
In June 1940, 96° Gruppo Tuffatori was relocated to Pantelleria, a small island off Sicily, in anticipation of attacks on Malta and the British Mediterranean fleet. The commander of the group, Maggiore Ercolano Ercolani, made it clear to the General Staff that in combat the performance of the aircraft was such that it would result in 100% losses. In order to prove his assertion, Ercolani volunteered to fly the aircraft himself. These aircraft still didn't suffer any losses until the transfer to Pantelleria, when one of them crashed to a wall, killing the pilot. The others carried out a few missions over the Mediterranean until the end of July, but were never involved in real combat.

The aircraft was soon withdrawn from service and scrapped, and the Regia Aeronautica was obliged to acquire Junkers Ju 87s from Germany which were rapidly introduced into service by the end of summer 1940. The differences in speed and other characteristics between the two aircraft was not great, apart from the availability of a rear gunner, but the Ju 87 was much more effective as a combat aircraft.

In any case, this new aircraft didn't compare well with the Ju 87's capabilities, even with a new set of airbrakes, flaps and other improvements (but also hampered by the addition of a new cockpit that provided poor rear and side vision for the pilot). The only marginal advantage compared to the Ju 87 was the twin-engine configuration, but the limited power of each engine was not enough to assure a return home if one of these was disabled. The air-cooled design allowed for the elimination of radiators and their vulnerability (with an improvement on aerodynamics, cost and weight), but at low speed and with a limited airflow, overheating was always an issue for this type of engine. The SM.86 was 32 km/h (20 mph) faster than the Junkers Ju 87B and even 2 km/h (1.2 mph) faster than the Ju 87D, but these differences, when compared to opposing fighter's speeds, were minimal. Without a good field of view all-around, and without the second crewmember in the cockpit armed with a defensive machine gun (nor a forward-firing weapon), the SM.86 was clearly more vulnerable to enemy fighters than the Junkers.

== Variants ==
SM.85
34 production aircraft (including prototypes). There were two prototypes, 10 of the B version (with smaller engine cowling rings) built in March 1939, and 22 model Cs, fitted with a "San Giorgio" reflector gunsight and with provision for a 7.7 mm (0.303 in) or 12.7 mm (0.5 in) machine gun. They were built in July–December 1939 (MM 21689-21707 and 21847-21849). The limited production resulted in a curtailing of further type development.

SM.86

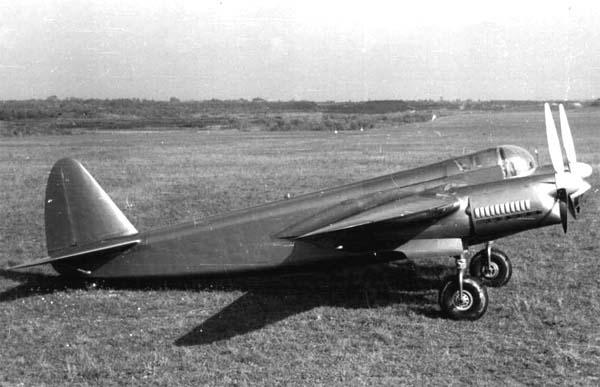
Savoia-Marchetti SM.86

Derived from the SM.85, it first flew on 8 April 1939 fitted with 447 kW (600 hp) Walter Sagitta inline engines of Czechoslovak manufacture. This was a totally new aircraft, only marginally similar to the previous SM.85. The specifications included: wing area 30.8 m^{2} (331.5 ft^{2}), length 10.9 m (36 ft), height 3.35 m (11 ft), wingspan 14 m (46 ft), weight 3,300 kg (7,275 lb) empty, and payload of 1,720 kg (3,790 lb), which was around 50% higher than the SM.85 and enough to carry all the fuel and bombs together. The performances of the SM.86 included a speed of 412 km/h (256 mph) at 4,000 m (13,120 ft), 336 km/h (209 mph) cruise speed at 5,000 m (16,400 ft), climb to 4,000 m (13,120 ft) in 14 min 17 sec.

The SM.86 was remarkably similar to the Henschel Hs 129 in appearance, weight, and performance; their roles were different, the SM.86 having neither heavy armour nor cannon for ground attack (there were some similarities to the de Havilland Mosquito in that the SM.86 also used a small forward cockpit, inline engines, high mounted wing, and wooden construction).

The SM.86 was evaluated at Guidonia in 1939, but in April 1940, an order for 97 of them was cancelled, despite the necessity to equip a wing with dive bombers. Although the SM.86 showed an overall improvement in performance, only one was eventually built. It was used over Malta and Greece, because Savoia-Marchetti hoped to receive a contract for this new aircraft. Even though the test aircraft was downed (by a Ju 87), the aircraft project was continued despite the lack of any official interest until 1941, when it was terminated. A second prototype powered by 403 kW (540 hp) Isotta Fraschini Gamma engines flew in August 1941. The development of the aircraft was abandoned soon after.

== Operators ==
Kingdom of Italy

- Regia Aeronautica
  - 96° Gruppo Tuffatori

== Specifications (SM.85) ==
Data from The Encyclopedia of World Aircraft

General characteristics

- Crew: 1
- Length: 10.4 m (34 ft 1 in)
- Wingspan: 14 m (45 ft 11 in)
- Height: 3.3 m (10 ft 10 in)
- Wing area: 25.8 m^{2} (278 sq ft)
- Empty weight: 2,950 kg (6,504 lb)
- Max takeoff weight: 4,190 kg (9,237 lb)
- Powerplant: 2 × Piaggio Stella P.VII C.35 9-cylinder air-cooled radial piston engine, 343 kW (460 hp) each
- Propellers: 3-bladed variable-pitch propeller

Performance

- Maximum speed: 368 km/h (229 mph, 199 kn)
- Range: 870 km (540 mi, 470 nmi)
- Service ceiling: 6,500 m (21,300 ft)

Armament

- Guns: 1 × fixed forward 12.7 mm (.5 in) or 7.7 mm (.303 in) machine gun
- Bombs: 1 × 800 kg (1,764 lb) bomb
