= Caudron C.870 =

Training aircraft

C.870

General information
- Type: Trainer
- Manufacturer: Caudron
- Number built: 2

History
- First flight: January 1940

The Caudron C.870 was a training aircraft built by Caudron in the early 1940s.

It was a low-wing monoplane of all-metal construction. Although two prototypes were built, the C.870 was not put into series production.

== Specifications ==
Data from

General characteristics

- Crew: 2
- Length: 9.98 m (32 ft 9 in)
- Wingspan: 10.2 m (33 ft 6 in)
- Wing area: 16.8 m^{2} (181 sq ft)
- Powerplant: 1 × Renault 12R-09 V-12 inverted air-cooled piston engine, 270 kW (360 hp)
- Propellers: 3-bladed constant-speed propeller

Performance

- Maximum speed: 400 km/h (250 mph, 220 kn)
