= Dewoitine D.720 =

D.720

General information
- Type: Reconnaissance / Army co-operation
- National origin: France
- Manufacturer: Dewoitine / Société Nationale de Constructions Aéronautiques du Midi
- Number built: 1

History
- First flight: 10 July 1939

The Dewoitine D.720 T3 was a French reconnaissance/cooperation aircraft built by Dewoitine in the late 1930s.

== Design and development ==
In 1937 the Service Technique de l'Aéronautique (STAe) issued a specification for a three-seat reconnaissance / Army co-operation, T3-(Triplace de Travail), aircraft, to fulfil several roles, including tactical reconnaissance, army co-operation, light bomber and crew trainer.

Development was started at Dewoitine, but the company was soon absorbed into the nationalised Société Nationale de Constructions Aéronautiques du Midi, where development continued. The design of the first aircraft, designated D.700 T3, began in January 1938 and construction was started in May 1938. The STAe altered the requirements soon after assembly began, stipulating that the observer be moved from a ventral gondola to the nose of the aircraft. The engines were also changed from two 220 hp (160 kW) Renault 6Q engines to two 500 hp (370 kW) Renault 12R-00 V-12 engines and the new aircraft was re-designated D.720 T3.

The D.720 was constructed largely of wood with fabric and ply-wood veneer skinning, with a rectangular section fuselage housing the crew in two glazed cockpits. The observer sat in the nose under extensive glazing, the pilot and co-pilot sat in tandem behind the observer in a separate glazed cockpit. Provision was made in the centre fuselage, behind the co-pilots position, for an oblique F30 of F50 or ventral F70 camera, or a Type F and two Type J racks for light bombs. The shoulder mounted wings were also built from wood with mostly ply skinning, supporting the two engine nacelles which housed the retractable main undercarriage and the two 500 hp (370 kW) Renault 12R engines, driving 3-bladed variable-pitch propellers. The tail unit had a cantilever tailplane with end-plate fins.

Defensive armament, specified in the revised requirement to fulfill the crew training role, consisted of four hand trained MAC 34 machine guns, one each in nose and ventral positions, with two in a SAMMA B33 dorsal turret.

== Operational history ==
The prototype was first flown on 10 July 1939, at Toulouse-Francazals, by Marcel Doret and after the manufacturer's flight tests, was flown to the Centre d'Essais du Matériel Aérien (CEMA) at Orléans-Bricy on 25 September 1939. Deliveries of the Potez 630 were ramping up by this time and the Potez 63.16 T3 crew trainer, was going to be available in a much shorter time-frame, leading to abandonment of the D.730.

== Variants ==
D.700
The aircraft as originally specified by the STAe, powered by 220 hp (160 kW) Renault 6Q engines, with a ventral gondola for the observer; not built.
D.720
The first prototype to the up-dated specification, powered by 500 hp (370 kW) Renault 12R-00 engines, with the observer moved to the nose; one bult.

== Specifications (D.720) ==
Data from Aviafrance : Dewoitine D.720, Airwar : Dewoitine D.720

General characteristics

- Crew: 3
- Length: 10.5 m (34 ft 5 in)
- Wingspan: 14.9 m (48 ft 11 in)
- Height: 3.71 m (12 ft 2 in)
- Wing area: 32.4 m^{2} (349 sq ft)
- Empty weight: 2,617 kg (5,769 lb)
- Gross weight: 3,822 kg (8,426 lb)
- Powerplant: 2 × Renault 12R-00 V-12 inverted air-cooled piston engines, 370 kW (500 hp) each

Performance

- Maximum speed: 360 km/h (220 mph, 190 kn) at 3,600 m (11,800 ft)
- Range: 1,530 km (950 mi, 830 nmi)
- Service ceiling: 8,400 m (27,600 ft)
- Time to altitude: 4,000 m (13,000 ft) in 10 minutes

Armament

- Guns: 1x fixed forward firing 7.5 mm (0.30 in) MAC 34 machine gun, plus one each in dorsal and ventral turrets
- Bombs: 220 kg (490 lb) of bombs (up to 22 x 10 kg (22 lb) bombs)
