= Avia Rk.12 =

Rk.12
- Type: Seven-cylinder air-cooled radial
- National origin: Czechoslovakia
- Manufacturer: Avia (Avia akciova spolecnost pro prumysl letecky), Prague

One of Avia's own designs, the 1930s Avia Rk.12 was a seven-cylinder radial engine with a rated output of 150 kW (200 hp), built in Czechoslovakia.

== Design and development ==
As well as producing aircraft and building Hispano-Suiza and Lorraine aero-engines under licence, Avia also designed and built their radial engines. Their Rk.12 was a seven-cylinder supercharged model, rated at 200 hp.

It was a conventional air-cooled radial: nitrided steel barrels with integral fins were screwed into heat-treated Y alloy heads. The pistons were also of heat-treated Y alloy. The crankcase was cast from aluminium alloy, with some minor parts using magnesium alloy. The single-throw, two-piece crankshaft was linked to the pistons with an I-section Y alloy master rod, with a single-piece big end, which carried the other six piston rods.

== Applications ==
- Avia 51

== Specifications ==
Data from Jane's All the World's Aircraft 1938

=== General characteristics ===
- Type: Seven-cylinder air-cooled radial
- Bore: 130 mm (5.12 in)
- Stroke: 130 mm (5.12 in)
- Displacement: 12.08 L (737 cu in)
- Length: 1,047.5 mm (41.24 in)
- Diameter: 1,110 mm (43.7 in
- Dry weight: dry, with ancillaries, without propeller hub 215.5 kg (475 lb)

=== Components ===
- Valvetrain: one inlet and one exhaust valve per cylinder, operated by push rods via rocker gear. Six cam push rod disc drive.
- Supercharger: impeller drive ratio 10.7:1
- Fuel system: single barrel Zenith 70P or Stromberg NAR68 carburettor
- Ignition system: Scintilla magnetos, automatic advance
- Fuel type: petrol, 74 Octane
- Oil system: dry sump, with one pressure and one scavenging pump
- Cooling system: air-cooled
- Reduction gear: direct drive

=== Performance ===
- Power output: rated, maintained to 3,000 m (9,840 ft), at 2,200 rpm: 150 kW (200 hp)
- Power output: maximum continuous 195 kW (260 hp)
- Power output: take-off 210 kW (280 hp)
- Compression ratio: 5.3:1
- Fuel consumption: 62 L/hr (13.64 Imp gal/h, 16.4 US gal/h)
- Oil consumption: at cruising speed, 2 kg/h (4.4 lbs/h)
