= Avia Rk.17 =

Rk.17
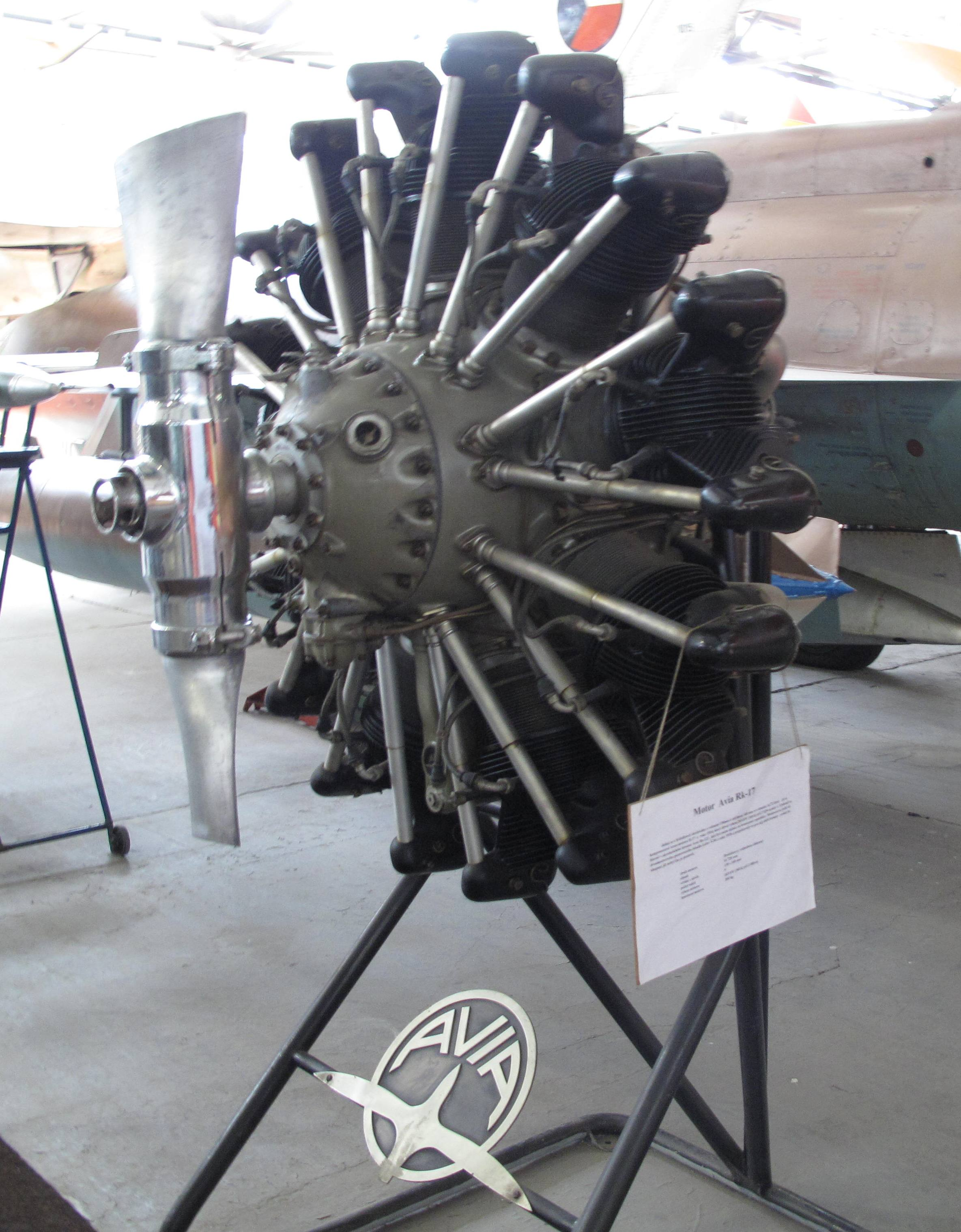
- Rk.17 in Letecké muzeum Kbely, Prague
- Type: 9-cylinder air-cooled radial
- National origin: Czechoslovakia
- Manufacturer: Avia (Avia akciova spolecnost pro prumysl letecky), Prague

The Avia Rk.17 was a 9-cylinder radial aircraft engine, developed from the 7-cylinder Avia Rk.12, with a rated output of 270 kW (360 hp). The Rk.17 was one of Avia's own designs and was built in Czechoslovakia in the 1930s.

== Design and development ==
As well as producing aircraft and building Hispano-Suiza and Lorraine aero-engines under licence, Avia also designed and built their own radial engines. The Rk.17 was a 9-cylinder supercharged model, rated at 360 hp. It was a nine-cylinder version of their Rk.12.

It was a conventional air-cooled radial: nitrided steel barrels with integral fins were screwed into heat treated Y alloy heads. The pistons were also of heat treated Y alloy. The crankcase was cast from heat treated silumin alloy, with some minor parts using magnesium alloy. The single throw two piece crankshaft was linked to the pistons with an I-section Y alloy master rod, with a single piece big end, which carried the other eight piston rods.

== Applications ==
- Avia Ba.122
- Letov Š-50

== Specifications ==
Data from Jane's All the World's Aircraft 1938

=== General characteristics ===
- Type: 9-cylinder air-cooled radial
- Bore: 130 mm (5.12 in)
- Stroke: 140 mm (5.51 in)
- Displacement: 16.72 L (1,020 cu in)
- Length: 1,065 mm (41.93 in)
- Diameter: 1,184 mm (46.61 in)
- Dry weight: 260 kg (573 lb) with ancillaries, without propeller hub

=== Components ===
- Valvetrain: one inlet and one exhaust valve per cylinder, operated by push-rods via rocker gear. Eight cam push-rod disc drive.
- Supercharger: impeller drive ratio 10.7:1
- Fuel system: single barrel Stromberg NAR80G carburettor
- Ignition system: Scintilla magnetos, automatic advance
- Fuel type: petrol, 85 Octane
- Oil system: dry sump, with one pressure and one scavenging pump
- Cooling system: air-cooled
- Reduction gear: direct drive

=== Performance ===
- Power output: rated maintained up to 2,750 m (9,000 ft), at 2,200 rpm 270 kW (360 hp)
- Power output: maximum continuous at 2,200 rpm 300 kW (400 hp)
- Power output: take-off at 2,020 rpm 330 kW (440 hp)
- Compression ratio: 6.4:1
- Specific fuel consumption: 255 g/(kW.h) (0.562 lb/(hp.h))
- Oil consumption: 8.7 g/(kW.h) (0.23 oz/(hp.h))
