= Letov Š-50 =

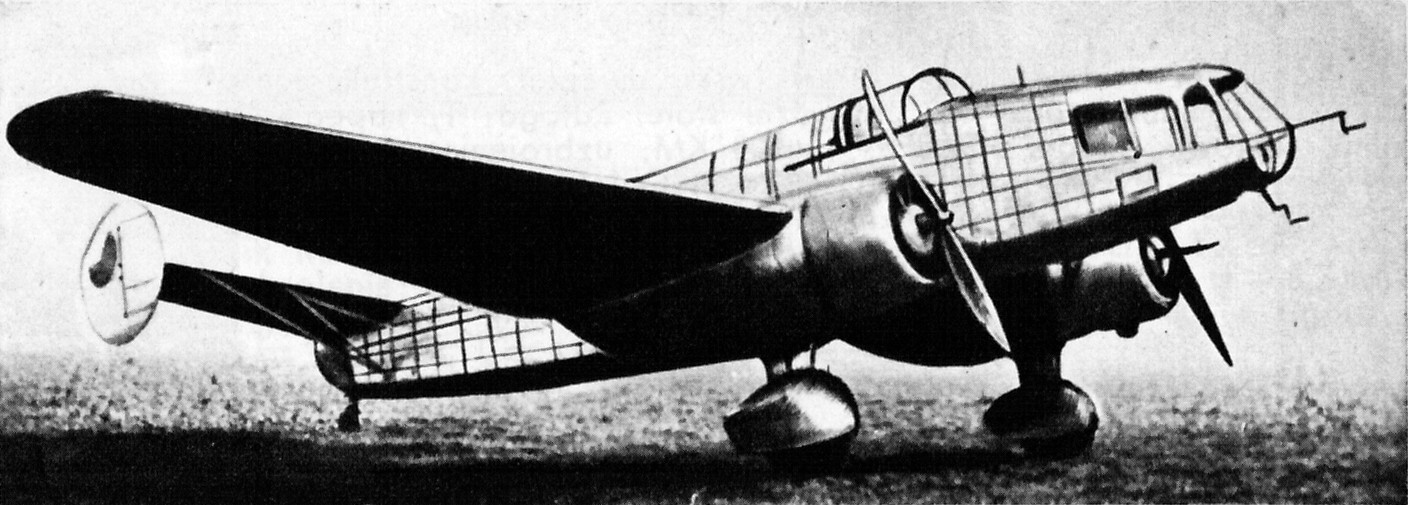

General information
- Type: General-utility monoplane
- National origin: Czechoslovakia
- Manufacturer: Letov
- Number built: 1

History
- First flight: 1938

The Letov Š-50 was a 1930s prototype Czechoslovak military general-purpose monoplane, designed and built by Letov.

== Development ==
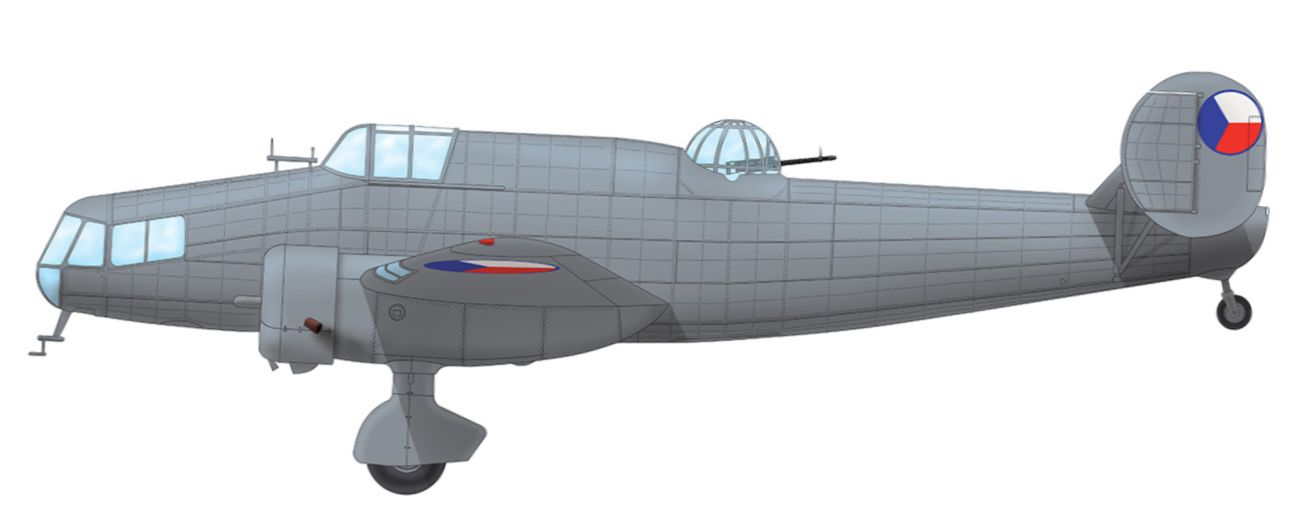
Letov Š.50.1, prototype, autumn 1938

The Š-50 was an all-metal twin-engined low mid-wing monoplane that first flew in 1938. It was powered by two 420 hp (313 kW) Avia Rk.17 radial engines. It had a fixed landing gear and twin fins and rudders. Following the German occupation, development was stopped.

== Specifications ==
Data from Les Ailes, 1 December 1938

General characteristics

- Crew: three: observer/radio operator/bombaimer/nose gunner, pilot and dorsal gunner
- Length: 12.60 m (41 ft 4 in)
- Wingspan: 17.30 m (56 ft 9 in)
- Height: 3.80 m (12 ft 6 in)
- Wing area: 43 m^{2} (460 sq ft)
- Empty weight: 2,475 kg (5,456 lb)
- Gross weight: 4,093 kg (9,024 lb) in bomber configuration
- Fuel capacity: 920 L (200 imp gal; 240 US gal)
- Powerplant: 2 × Avia Rk.17 nine-cylinder radial piston engine, 310 kW (420 hp) each
- Propellers: 2-bladed Hamilton Standard metal, constant speed

Performance

- Maximum speed: 305 km/h (190 mph, 165 kn)
- Cruise speed: 270 km/h (170 mph, 150 kn) at 1,000 m (3,300 ft)
- Range: 1,200 km (750 mi, 650 nmi) at crise spee, bomber configuration
- Service ceiling: 7,200 m (23,600 ft) practical
- Time to altitude: 7.5 min to 3,000 m (9,800 ft)
- Take-off and landing distances: 140 m (460 ft)

Armament

- 1 × fixed ZB vz.30
- 2 × flexible ZB vz.30
- up to 600 kg bombs
