= Walter Sagitta =

1930s Czech piston aircraft engine

Sagitta
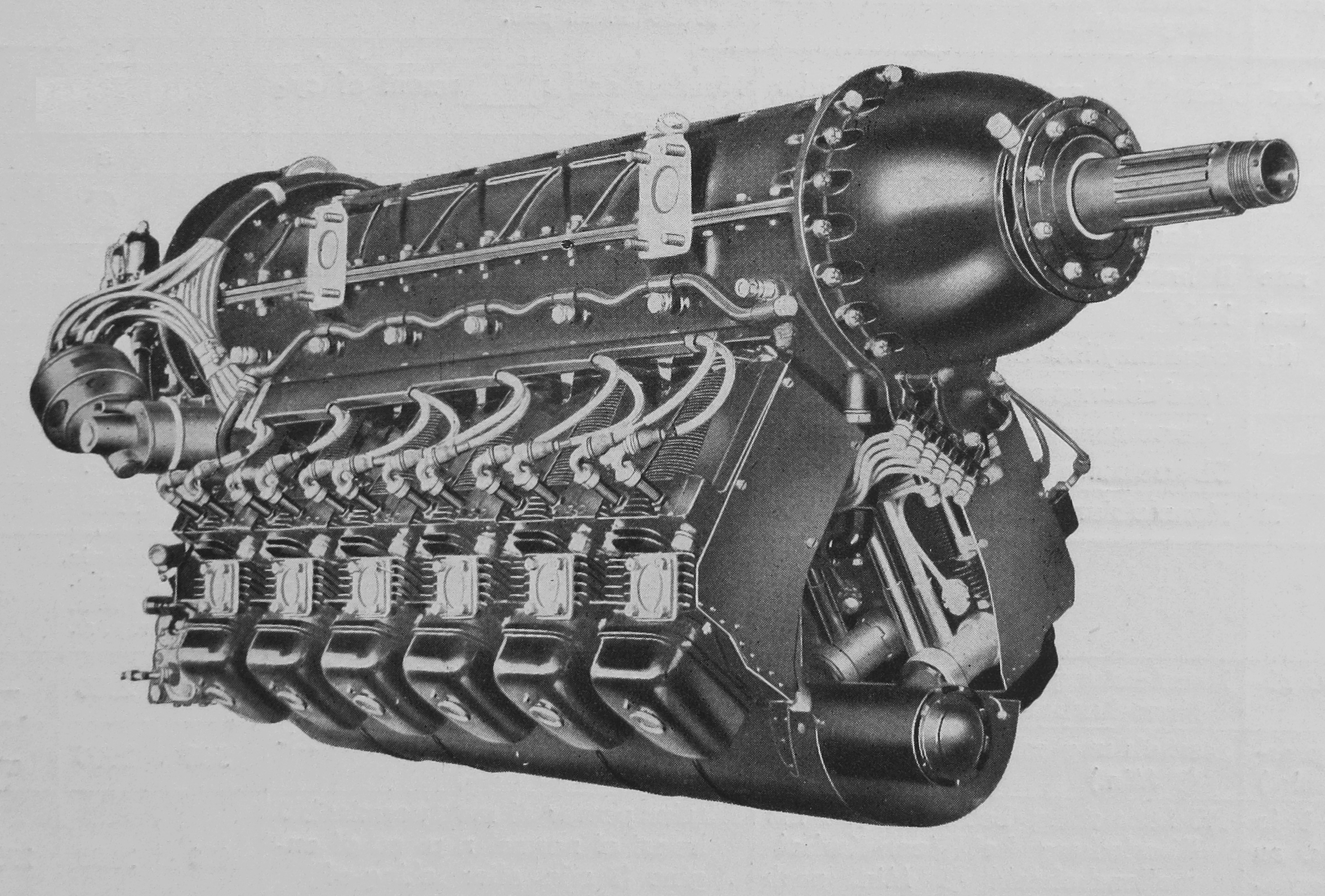
- Type: Piston aero engine
- National origin: Czechoslovakia
- Manufacturer: Walter Aircraft Engines
- First run: 1937

The Walter Sagitta was a Czechoslovak, air-cooled, inverted V-12 engine that first ran in 1937. This was one of several smaller, low-mass medium power pre-war V-12 engines produced. With a displacement of 18.4 liters (1,123 cu in), it produced up to 373 kW (550 hp) at 2,500 rpm.

== Variants ==
Sagitta I-MR
410 kW (550 hp) at 2,500rpm at 2,500 m (8,200 ft) - rated height

Sagitta I-SR
400 kW (535 hp) at 2,500rpm at 3,800 m (12,500 ft) - rated height

Sagitta II R.C.
388 kW (520 hp), fully supercharged.

Alfa Romeo 122

Licensed production.

== Applications ==
- Fokker D.XXIII
- Praga E-51
- Rogožarski R-313
- Savoia-Marchetti SM.86
- VEF I-16

== Specifications (Sagitta I-MR) ==
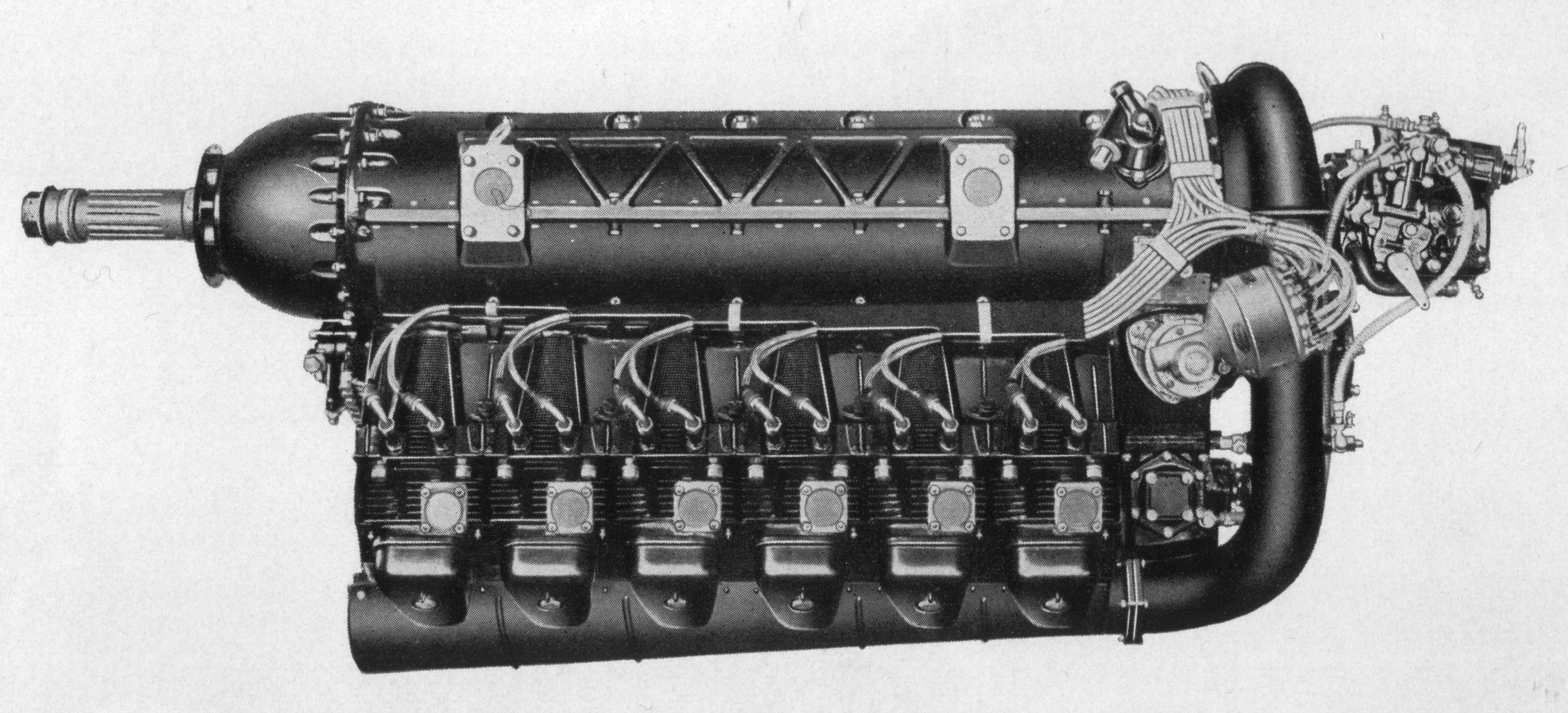
Left side view

Data from Jane's.

=== General characteristics ===
- Type: 12-cylinder inverted vee piston engine
- Bore: 118 mm (4.65 in)
- Stroke: 140 mm (5.51 in)
- Displacement: 18.372 L (1,121.1 cu in)
- Length: 1,914 mm (75.35 in)
- Width: 725 mm (28.54 in)
- Height: 796 mm (31.34 in)
- Dry weight: 372 kg (820 lb)

=== Components ===
- Valvetrain: Enclosed push-rod operated rockers, two valves per cylinder closed by triple springs
- Supercharger: 8.7 times crankshaft speed
- Fuel system: Automatic boost and mixture control by a horizontal carburettor
- Fuel type: 85 Octane petrol
- Oil system: Dry sump, one pressure pump and two scavenge pumps
- Cooling system: Air-cooled

=== Performance ===
- Power output:
  - Take-off: 418 kW (560 hp) at 2,500 rpm
  - Rated power: 410 kW (550 hp) at 2,500 rpm at 2,300 m (7,500 ft)
  - Maximum power: 447 kW (600 hp) at 2,500 rpm at 1,750 m (5,740 ft)
- Specific power: 24.29 kW/L (0.534 hp/(cu in))
- Compression ratio: 6.25:1
- Specific fuel consumption: 0.315 - 0.328 kg/(kW h) (0.525 - 0.548 lb/(hp h))
- Oil consumption: 0.004 - 0.0067 kg/(kW h) (0.0067 - 0.11 lb/(hp h))
- Power-to-weight ratio: 1.046 kW/kg (0.636 hp/lb)

== See also ==
Comparable engines

- Alfa Romeo 122
- Argus As 411
- de Havilland Gipsy Twelve
- Isotta Fraschini Gamma
- Ranger V-770

Related lists

- List of aircraft engines
