= CA-113 =

CA-113 may refer to:

- California State Route 113, a highway in the US state of California
- Caproni Ca.113, an experimental aircraft
