= Caproni Ca.313 =

Reconnaissance bomber developed by Caproni in Italy prior to World War II

Ca.313
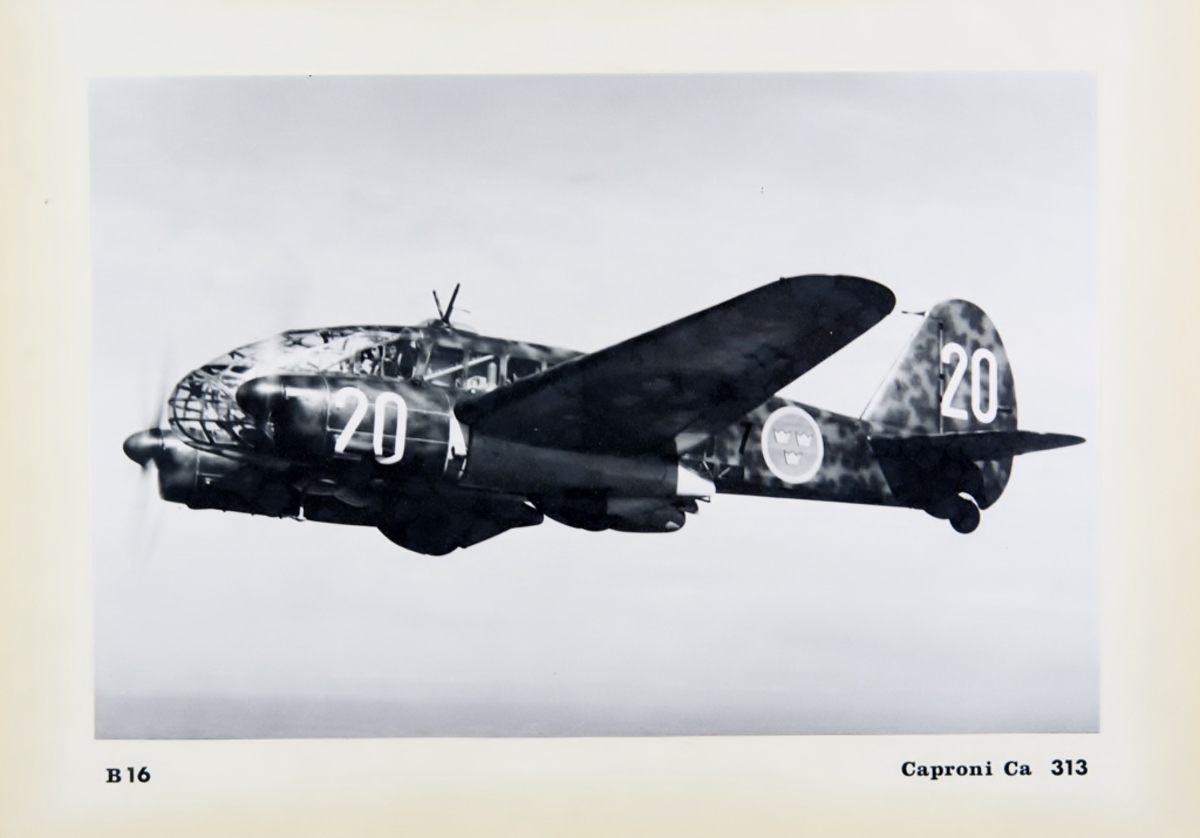
- A Caproni Ca.313 in Swedish service

General information
- Type: Reconnaissance aircraft and light bomber
- Manufacturer: Caproni
- Designer: Cesare Pallavicino
- Primary users: Regia Aeronautica Swedish Air Force
- Number built: 271

History
- First flight: 22 December 1939
- Developed from: Caproni Ca.310

The Caproni Ca.313 was an Italian twin-engine reconnaissance bomber of the late-1930s. It was a development of the Ca.310. Its variants were exported to several other countries.

== Design and development ==
The Caproni Aeronautica Bergamasca, a subsidiary of the large Italian aviation conglomerate Caproni, developed a series of twin-engined light monoplanes in the 1930s and 1940s, ultimately derived from the all-wooden Caproni Ca.308 Borea airliner, which first flew in 1935. The Caproni Ca.309 Ghibli colonial general purpose aircraft flew in 1936, and the more powerful Caproni Ca.310, fitted with a retractable undercarriage, and powered by 460 hp (340 kW) Piaggio P.VII radial engines, in 1937. The Ca.310 was purchased in small numbers by the Regia Aeronautica (Italian Air Force), and by several export customers, including Peru, Hungary and Norway. The Ca.310 proved unable to meet it guaranteed performance, however, and in order to meet Norwegian requirements, Caproni developed the Ca.312, a Ca.310 re-engined with 650 hp (480 kW) Piaggio P.XVI R.C. 35 radials, which first flew on 7 December 1938. The Ca.312 was accepted by Norway as a replacement for the remainder of its Ca.310s (only four of which had been delivered), while 24 more were ordered by Belgium for service in the Belgian Congo.

Caproni had meanwhile developed the Caproni Ca.311, based on the Ca.310 with a revised nose, which was adopted by the Regia Aeronautica as a reconnaissance-bomber and observation aircraft. The Ca.313 was a further development of the Ca.311 with more powerful Isotta-Fraschini air-cooled engines inverted V-12 engines, which promised greatly improved performance. The prototype, a converted Ca.310, powered by two 770 hp (570 kW) Isotta-Fraschini A.120 I.R.C.C.40 engines, first flew on 22 December 1939.

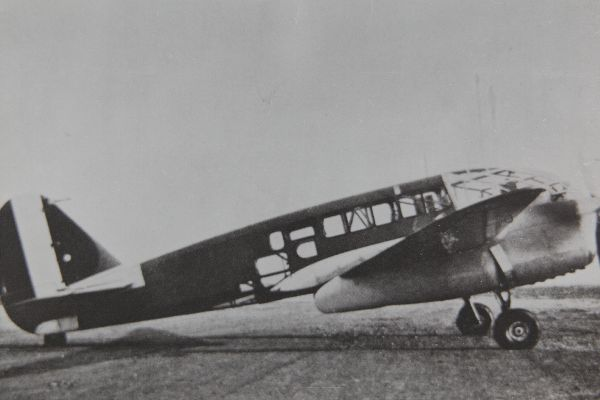

The Ca.313's fuselage had a steel-tube structure, with fabric covering, while the wing was of wooden construction (initially using Spruce and later Fir) with plywood covering. The aircraft's tail surfaces were of fabric and plywood covered metal construction. The aircraft had a retractable tailwheel undercarriage, with the mainwheels retracting into the engine nacelles. Production aircraft were powered by Isotta-Fraschini Delta R.C.35 I-D.S. engines rated at 730 hp (540 kW) driving three-bladed propellers. Two 520 L (110 imp gal; 140 US gal) aluminium fuel tanks were situated in the centre-section of the wings, with provision for additional tanks in the fuselage.

The aircraft had a crew of three, with a pilot and co-pilot sitting side-by-side. The co-pilot also had the duties of observer/bomb-aimer (with a station in the aircraft's nose) and manning the dorsal gun turret. The third crew member was the radio operator, who sat aft and also operated the aircraft's ventral gun. Initial production Ca.313s, including the orders from France, Britain and Sweden, were known as the Ca.313 R.P.B.1, and had a glazed, unstepped nose, while later aircraft (Ca.313 R.P.B.2) had a stepped nose, with a separate cockpit. Up to 400 kg (880 lb) of bombs could be carried in a bomb bay, while Swedish bombers could carry a 250 kg (550 lb) bomb on an external rack. Defensive armament consisted of a single machine gun in a dorsal turret, one in a ventral position, and one or two machine guns in the wing roots. The machine guns used varied between users; French aircraft used 7.5 mm machine guns, with Swedish aircraft using 8 mm machine guns, and Italian aircraft using 12.7 mm guns.

France ordered 200 Ca.313s on 26 September 1939, before the first flight of the type, while Great Britain ordered 300 aircraft (together with 100 Ca.311s for use as trainers) on 26 January 1940. Sweden ordered 84 Ca.313s from 20 August 1940, with undelivered aircraft from the French order used to fulfil the order. The Regia Aeronautica (Italian Air Force) placed large orders for the Ca.313, with two new versions ordered, the R.P.B.2 with a stepped nose and the Ca.313 R.A. with a strengthened structure allowing a higher all-up weight, but the Ca. 313 .R.A. was later redesignated the Caproni Ca.314. In 1942, Germany ordered 905 Ca.905G, based on the R.P.B.2 but with more powerful engines, for use as crew trainers for bombers.

== Operational history ==
None of the Norwegian or Belgian Ca.312s were delivered before the German invasions of Norway and Belgium, with the Ca.312s being used by the Regia Aeronautica as transports and liaison aircraft. France only received five of its Ca.313s before the Italian declaration of War with France on 10 June 1940 stopped deliveries. At least one of the five aircraft remained in use by Vichy France in late 1942. Undelivered aircraft from the French order were incorporated into orders for Sweden and Italy. In April 1940, Italian sales of military material, including the Capronis, was suspended by the Italian government, but Caproni made a secret agreement with Britain to supply the aircraft via a Portuguese intermediary, but the Italian declaration of war stopped the deal for good.

The aircraft served mainly with Italy, in the light transport, trainer and maritime reconnaissance roles. Swedish Air Force designations were B 16, S 16, T 16, and Tp 16.

In the late 1930s, Sweden had an urgent requirement to build up its airforce, with one of the required types a twin engined bomber to act as an interim replacement for the obsolete Junkers Ju 86 (built by Sweden as the B 3) while the Saab 18 could be developed. The outbreak of war greatly hindered attempts to buy an aircraft to meet this requirement, with an order for 16 Bréguet 694s being cancelled at the start of the war, and an attempt to buy Dornier Do 215s from Germany also failing. With other opportunities closed off, Sweden agreed to purchase the Caproni Ca.313, with a contract for 54 aircraft being placed on 20 August 1940, with subsequent orders increased the total brought to 84 aircraft, at a cost of more than 39,900,000 Swedish kronor. Orders were also placed for the Fiat CR.42 and Reggiane Re.2000 fighters over the same period. The aircraft were ferried to Sweden between 1940 and 1941.

Between 1940 and 1943, there were 23 fatal accidents at the three air force bases (F 3, F 7 and F 11) that operated them. Three more were shot down by German fighters, on 18 and 23 May 1944. 41 crewmen died in these 'flying coffins'. The Ca.313 suffered many engine fires; this situation was not helped by the special fuel called Bentol, containing alcohol, that was used due to fuel shortage in Sweden because of the war. This fuel often dissolved the coating of the floats made of cork and also corroded the fuel tanks, causing leaks which would result in the fuel spilling onto the hot engines.

Other accidents occurred when the aircraft was used in a role for which it was not suited, such as dive bombing. For example, on 10 June 1942, one aircraft crashed following a wing failure. Many parts were not made to the correct standard. When it was realized that Sweden did not have the same accident problem, a modification programme was introduced and the rate of accidents dropped. For many years this machine, with its ten-hour endurance, was the only one capable of patrolling around Sweden. By all standards, it was obsolete by 1940. It was removed from service soon after the end of the war.

The Luftwaffe eventually ordered 905 machines called the CA.313G to be used for training purposes and other secondary employment, but only 117 planes were delivered. They had a different nose from the standard model. Two series of Ca.313 had this nose difference and were called 'Ca.313 R.P.B.1 and 2.

In 1942, Croatia received ten Caproni Ca 311M bombers which had been ordered and paid for by the former Royal Yugoslav government.

== Variants ==
- Ca.312 An enhanced Ca.310 with inline engines. Sold to Norway.
- Ca.313 Prototype A Ca.310 airframe with inline engines in place of previous radial engines.
- Ca.313 Production Improved derivative of Ca.310 with inline engines.
- Ca.313S Production Export model Ca.313 for Sweden with 84 aircraft made and delivered in three batches.

=== Swedish variants ===
Swedish Ca.313s were armed with one 13.2mm m/39 cannon in each wingroot and had 8mm m/22s in the turret and for the ventral gunner.

- B 16A Bomber variant. Had an internal bomb capacity of 500 kg and external bomb capacity of 400 kg with a total capacity of 800 kg. It was used as a dive bomber.
- S 16A Reconnaissance variant.
- T 16A Torpedo variant. Due to bad craftsmanship they were never used as torpedo bombers but were converted to reconnaissance planes.
- S 16B Designation for T 16s converted to reconnaissance planes.
- TP 16 Transport aircraft.

== Operators ==
Croatia

- Air Force of the Independent State of Croatia

France

- French Air Force - Five Ca 313F aircraft

Germany

- Luftwaffe

Kingdom of Italy

- Regia Aeronautica

Italy

- Italian Air Force

Norway

- Norwegian Army Air Service

Sweden

- Swedish Air Force

Planned
Belgium

- Belgian Air Force 24 Ca.312 were ordered in 1940, none could be delivered before the Fall of Belgium.

UK

- Royal Air Force 300 Ca 313s and 300 Re 2000s were ordered in January 1940, but the orders were cancelled when Italy entered the war in June 1940.

== Surviving aircraft ==
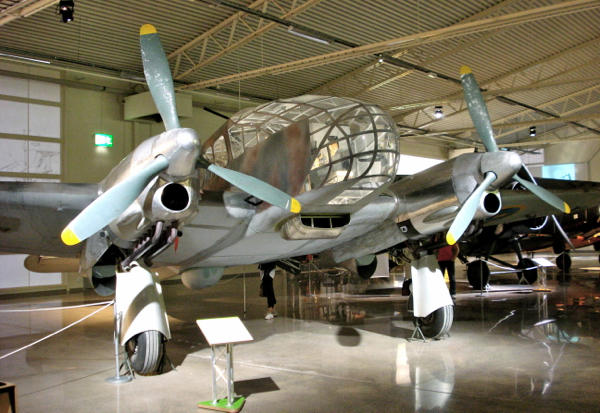
S 16 replica at Flygvapenmuseum

There are no original Ca.313 survivors. A full size replica built in Sweden for a TV miniseries using some original parts was put in the Flygvapenmuseum, Linköping after filming was completed. It can still be seen in that location.

== Specifications (Ca.313 R.P.B.2) ==
Data from The Caproni that Nearly Joined the RAF

General characteristics

- Crew: three
- Length: 11.80 m (38 ft 9 in)
- Wingspan: 16.65 m (54 ft 8 in)
- Height: 3.70 m (12 ft 2 in)
- Wing area: 38.90 m^{2} (418.7 sq ft)
- Empty weight: 4,300 kg (9,480 lb)
- Gross weight: 5,900 kg (13,007 lb)
- Powerplant: 2 × Isotta Fraschini Delta R.C.35 I-DS air-cooled inverted V12 engines, 540 kW (730 hp) each (take-off power)

Performance

- Maximum speed: 436 km/h (271 mph, 235 kn) at 3,500 m (11,500 ft)
- Cruise speed: 350 km/h (220 mph, 190 kn) (70% power, at 3,500 m (11,500 ft))
- Range: 1,200 km (750 mi, 650 nmi)
- Service ceiling: 7,300 m (24,000 ft)
- Time to altitude: 11 min 30 s to 4,000 m (13,000 ft)
- Take-off distance: 350 m (1,150 ft)
- Landing distance: 380 m (1,250 ft)

Armament

- Guns: 3 × 12.7 mm Scotti–Isotta Fraschini machine guns (1 in wing root, 1 in dorsal turret and 1 in ventral step)
- Bombs:
  - 4 × 100 kg (220 lb) or
  - 8 × 50 kg (110 lb) bombs or
  - 16 × 15 kg (33 lb) bombs or
  - 32 × 12 kg (26 lb) bombs
