= Caproni Ca.335 =

Italian fighter-bomber prototype

Ca.335 Maestrale/SABCA S.47
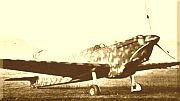

General information
- Type: Fighter-bomber/reconnaissance aircraft
- National origin: Italy/Belgium
- Manufacturer: Caproni/SABCA
- Designer: Cesare Pallavicino
- Number built: 1

History
- First flight: 16 February 1939
- Developed from: Caproni A.P.1
- Variant: Caproni Ca.355

The Caproni Ca.335 Maestrale (Mistral) was an Italian single-engined two-seat fighter-bomber/reconnaissance aircraft of the 1930s.

== Development and design ==
In October 1937, the Belgian aircraft manufacturer Société Anonyme Belge de Constructions Aéronautiques (SABCA) made a marketing agreement with the Italian company Caproni, with SABCA selling some of Caproni's military aircraft in certain markets, including the Caproni Ca.135, Ca.310 and the Ca.312, which were to be designated SABCA S.45bis, S.46 and S.48 respectively. As part of this agreement, Caproni were to develop a replacement for the Belgium Air Force's Fairey Fox biplanes, which were used as two-seat fighters and reconnaissance aircraft, but were obsolete.

The task of designing the new type for SABCA, the Caproni Ca.335 Maestrale, was given to Chief Engineer Cesare Pallavicino, who based the design on his earlier A.P.1 attack aircraft. It was a low-winged cantilever monoplane of mixed construction, with a metal skinned steel-tube fuselage and wood and fabric wings, powered by a single Hispano-Suiza 12Ycrs V12 engine. It had a hydraulically actuated retractable tailwheel undercarriage, with the mainwheels retracting backwards into the wing. The pilot and observer were provided with individual, widely separated cockpits, with the observer having defensive armament of a single machine gun, and the pilot firing a Hispano-Suiza HS.404 moteur-canon firing through the propeller hub and two wing mounted machine guns, a small bomb bay housing two 50 kg (110 lb) bombs, while a further ten 50 kg (22 lb) bombs could be carried under the wings.

The Ca.335 prototype was built at Caproni's Ponte San Pietro factory, making its maiden flight there on 16 February 1939. It was then dismantled and sent to SABCA's factory at Brussels by train. After reassembly, it flew again on 19 September 1939. Initial testing was successful, resulting in SABCA purchasing a license for manufacture of the Ca.335, and demonstrating it, now designated SABCA S.47, to officials of the Belgian Ministry of Defence and representatives of a number of other nations. While the Belgian Air Force were impressed by the S.47, and had a requirement for 24 of them, SABCA's factory was busy with orders for 41 Breguet 693s for the Belgian Air Force and for France, and 10 Koolhoven F.K.58s for France, delaying a formal order being placed.

On 14 March 1940, the prototype was being demonstrated to the French Armee de l'Air at Orléans when it was damaged in a minor landing accident. It had not been repaired when the Germans invaded France and the Low Countries, stopping SABCA's production plans. The prototype S.47 was captured by the advancing German forces on 13 June 1940. Attempts by Caproni to reclaim the S.47 were unsuccessful, it remaining in France until 1943, eventually being scrapped.

== Specifications (S.47) ==
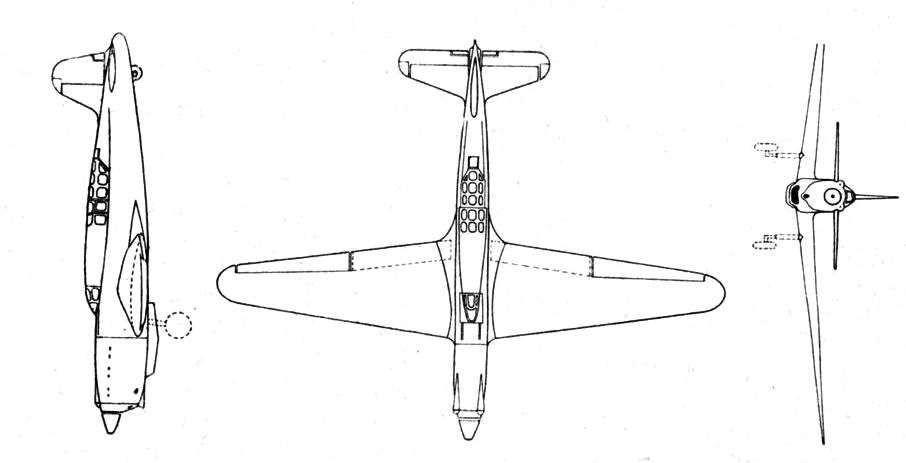
SABCA S.47 3-view drawing from L'Aerophile March 1940

Data from War Planes of the Second World War: Volume Seven Bombers and Reconnaissance Aircraft

General characteristics

- Crew: two
- Length: 10.60 m (34 ft 9 1/4 in)
- Wingspan: 13.20 m (43 ft 3 3/4 in)
- Height: 3.20 m (10 ft 6 in)
- Wing area: 23.80 m^{2} (256.2 sq ft)
- Empty weight: 2,250 kg (4,960 lb)
- Gross weight: 3,240 kg (7,143 lb) (reconnaissance mission)
- Max takeoff weight: 3,350 kg (7,385 lb)
- Powerplant: 1 × Hispano-Suiza 12Ycrs liquid-cooled V12 engine, 640 kW (860 hp) (take-off power)
- Propellers: 3-bladed bladed constant speed

Performance

- Maximum speed: 501 km/h (311 mph, 270 kn) at 4,200 m (13,780 ft)
- Range: 1,576 km (979 mi, 851 nmi) at 4,000 m (13,120 ft) (reconnaissance mission)
- Endurance: 4 h 30 s
- Service ceiling: 9,500 m (31,170 ft)
- Time to altitude:
  - 2,000 m (6,650 ft) in 3 min 30 s
  - 6,000 m (19,685 ft) in 15 min 20 s

Armament

- Guns:
  - 1× 20 mm Hispano-Suiza HS.404 firing through propeller hub and two 7.62 mm FN Browning machine guns in wing
  - 1× FN Browning machine gun in rear cockpit
- Bombs: 200 kg (440 lb) under wings and fuselage

== See also ==
Aircraft of comparable role, configuration, and era

- Fairey P.4/34

== Sources ==
- Domange, Yves (March 1999). "Quand les démocraties occidentales achetaient des avions dans l'Italie fasciste... (2^{ème} partie: la Belgique et l'Angleterre)" [When Western Democracies Bought Their Aircraft from Fascist Italy... (Part 2: Belgium and England)]. Avions: Toute l'aéronautique et son histoire (in French) (72): 40–47. ISSN 1243-8650.
- Green, William. War Planes of the Second World War: Volume Seven Bombers and Reconnaissance Aircraft. London:Macdonald, 1967.
