= Cesare Pallavicino =

Italian aircraft designer

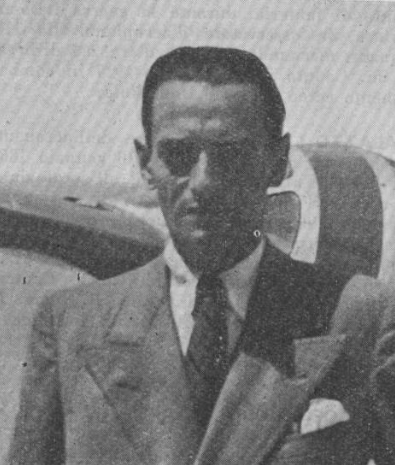
- Cesare Pallavicino (before 1936)
- Born: 1893; Rome, Italy
- Died: 1976 (aged 82–83); Bergamo, Italy
- Education: Politecnico di Torino
- Engineering career
- Projects: Ernesto Breda; Caproni

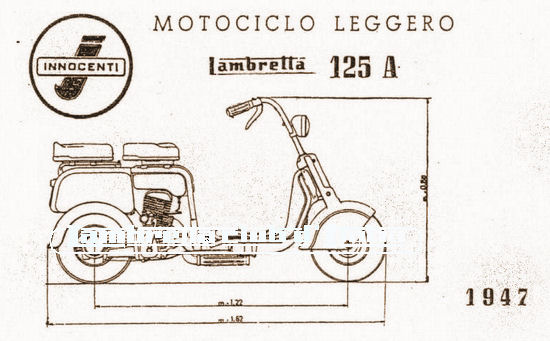
Lambretta 125 del 1947 Design by Cesare Pallavicino

Cesare Pallavicino (Rome, 1893 – Bergamo, 1976) was an Italian aeronautical engineer, heading the design department at Caproni from 1935 to 1941. He designed several important Italian aircraft, including the Breda Ba.15, Breda Ba.18, Breda Ba.19, Breda Ba.27, Breda Ba.35 and Breda Ba.39; and Caproni Ca.135, Caproni Ca.309, Caproni Ca.311, Caproni Ca.312, Caproni Ca.313, Caproni Ca.314 and Caproni Ca.315. He also designed the Caproni Ca.355, SABCA S 47, Caproni Ca.335, Caproni Ca.350 and Caproni Ca.380 aircraft of World War II.

== Life ==
Eng. Pallavicino graduated in 1922, aircraft manufacturers at the Politecnico di Torino in 1927 and joined Società Italiana Ernesto Breda as a design engineer, where he designed several aircraft such as the Ba.15, Ba.18 Ba.19, Ba.27 Ba.35 and Ba.39. In 1935 he moved to Caproni as chief designer, saw the light and several of his designs such as the famous Caproni AP.1,Caproni Ca.135, Caproni Ca.309, Caproni Ca.311, Caproni Ca.312 Caproni Ca.313 Caproni Ca.314 Caproni Ca.315 to the pre-war Caproni Ca.331, Caproni Ca.355, SABCA S 47 Caproni Ca .335, Caproni Ca.350, Caproni Ca.380. In 1946, shortly before emigrating to Argentina, dedicated to the design of the Lambretta the most famous Italian scooter along with Piaggio Vespa.

== See also ==
- FMA I.Ae. 27 Pulqui I
- FMA I.Ae. 30 Ñancú
