= Caproni Ca.350 =

Italian fighter-bomber project

General information
- Type: Fighter-bomber/reconnaissance aircraft
- National origin: Italy
- Manufacturer: Caproni
- Designer: Cesare Pallavicino

The Caproni Ca.350 was an Italian single-engined project for a two-seat fighter-bomber/reconnaissance aircraft of the 1930s. Designed by Cesare Pallavicino to meet a requirement of the Regia Aeronautica, it was an innovative and fast design, to have been powered by an Isotta Fraschini Zeta R.C.42, but no aircraft were built.

== Specifications ==
Data from

General characteristics

- Crew: two
- Length: 10.62 m (34 ft 10 in)
- Wingspan: 13.28 m (43 ft 7 in)
- Height: 3.2 m (10 ft 6 in)
- Wing area: 23.8 m^{2} (256 sq ft)
- Empty weight: 2,250 kg (4,960 lb)
- Gross weight: 3,240 kg (7,143 lb) (reconnaissance mission)
- Max takeoff weight: 4,399 kg (9,698 lb)
- Powerplant: 1 × Isotta Fraschini Zeta R.C.42 air-cooled X-24 piston engine, 930 kW (1,250 hp) (take-off power)
- Propellers: 3-bladed bladed constant speed

Performance

- Maximum speed: 647 km/h (402 mph, 349 kn) at 4,200 m (13,800 ft)
- Range: 1,448 km (900 mi, 782 nmi) at 4,000 m (13,000 ft) (reconnaissance mission)
- Endurance: 4 hr 30 min
- Service ceiling: 9,501 m (31,171 ft)

Armament

- Guns: *1x 20 mm (0.787 in) cannon firing through propeller hub
- 2x 7.62 mm (0.300 in) machine-guns in the wings
- 1x 7.62 mm (0.300 in) machine gun in rear cockpit
- Bombs: 200 kg (440 lb) bombs under wings and fuselage

== See also ==
Aircraft of comparable role, configuration, and era

- Fairey P.4/34
- Caproni Ca.335
