= Carina Massone Negrone =

Italian aviation pioneer (1911–1991)

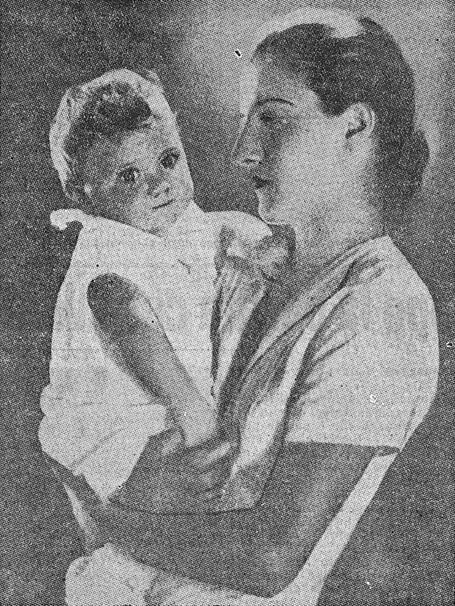
- Carina Massone Negrone with her son Vittorio
- Born: 20 June 1911; Bogliasco, Kingdom of Italy (1861-1946)
- Died: 19 March 1991 (aged 79); Bogliasco, Italy
- Occupation: Aviator
- Title: Marchesa

The marchioness Carina Massone Negrone (20 June 1911 in Bogliasco – 19 March 1991 in Bogliasco) was an Italian aviator. She is considered to be one of the first heroines of the sky.

== Biography ==
Married to the marquis Ambrogio Negrone (with whom she had a son, Vittorio), she was the first Italian woman to obtain (in 1933) a pilot's license from the Reale Unione Nazionale Aeronautica (RUNA).

A keen sportswoman (swimming, ski, tennis), she preferred flying, an activity that at the time was mainly practised by men, the intended interpreters of the manly dynamism encouraged by Futurism and Fascism.

On 5 May 1934, she established her first personal record by flying at an altitude of 5,544 metres with a Class C seaplane. Following this achievement and with the support of her friend Italo Balbo, she decided to attempt to beat Maryse Hilsz's world record of 11,289 metres. As preparation, she trained as an air force pilot at Guidonia Montecelio airport.

On 20 June 1935, Carina took off from the Guidonia Montecelio base on a Caproni biplane equipped with a Pegasus 1110 engine, taking with her a heated jacket and oxygen cylinder.

Due to air rarefaction and low temperature at high altitude (down to -35 °C), her medical staff did not expect her to fly beyond an altitude of 11,000 metres. However, despite a state of daze (that she referred to as euphoria), through sheer determination she reached 12,043 metres (39,402 feet), thus beating Hilsz's record by 754 metres.

Her record still stands for that category of propeller-powered planes.

She went on to achieve 7 additional flying world records, the last of which was on 19 June 1954, flying from Brescia to Luxor (Egypt) - 2,987 km in 13 hours 34 minutes, at an average speed of 299 km per hour.

In 1951 she took part in an aerial tour of Algeria alongside Ada Marchelli on a Macchi monoplane. She took part in various international competitions and she eventually founded a pilot school.

A commemorative stamp with a face value of L. 750 was issued in her honour by Poste Italiane in 1996. A square has been dedicated to Carina Negrone in her home town.

== See also ==
- Maryse Hilsz
- Italo Balbo

== Bibliography ==
- Massimo Zamorani, Nel cielo di Genova: due secoli di voli, Ecig, Genova 1986 (in Italian)
- Massimo Zamorani, Vola Genova. Cento anni di volo, De Ferrari, Genova 1997 ISBN 8871721039 (in Italian)
