= Breda Ba.19 =

Ba.19
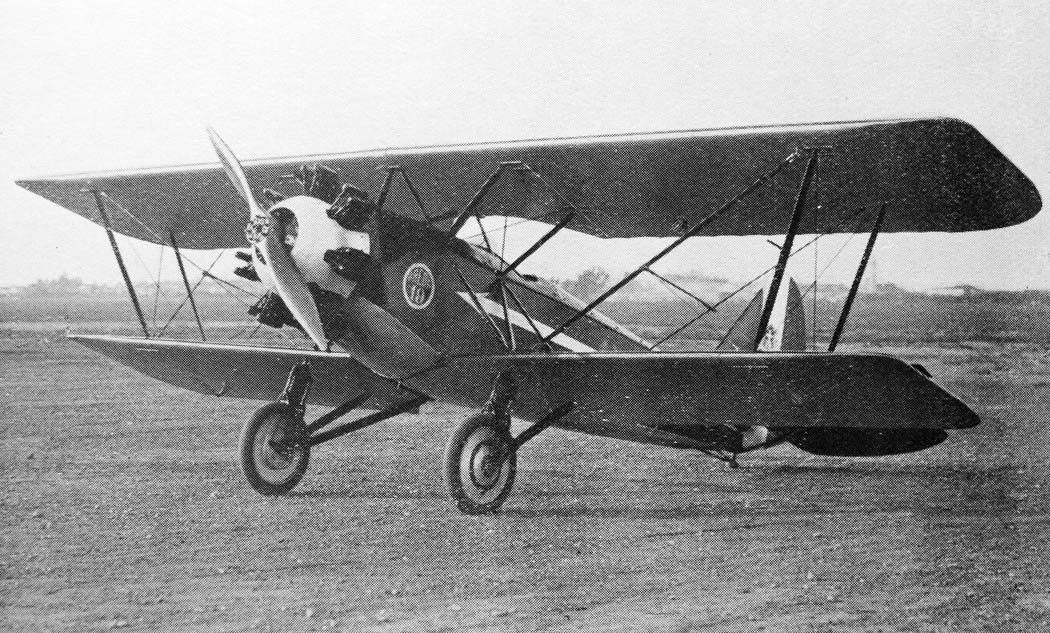

General information
- Type: Military aerobatic trainer
- Manufacturer: Breda
- Designer: Cesare Pallavicino
- Primary user: Regia Aeronautica
- Number built: 42

History
- Introduction date: 1931
- First flight: 1928

A Ba.19 under the wing of the Breda CC.20 heavy bomber prototype.

The Breda Ba.19 was an Italian single-seat aerobatic biplane aircraft developed as an air force trainer in 1928.

== Design and development ==
The Breda Ba.19 was a single-bay, unequal-span, unstaggered biplane of conventional configuration which seated its pilot in an open cockpit. A few Ba.19s were produced as two-seaters with a second open cockpit in tandem with the first.

== Operational history ==
The Ba.19s were used throughout the 1930s for display flights by the Squadriglia di Alta Acrobazia Aerea, performing formation aerobatics.

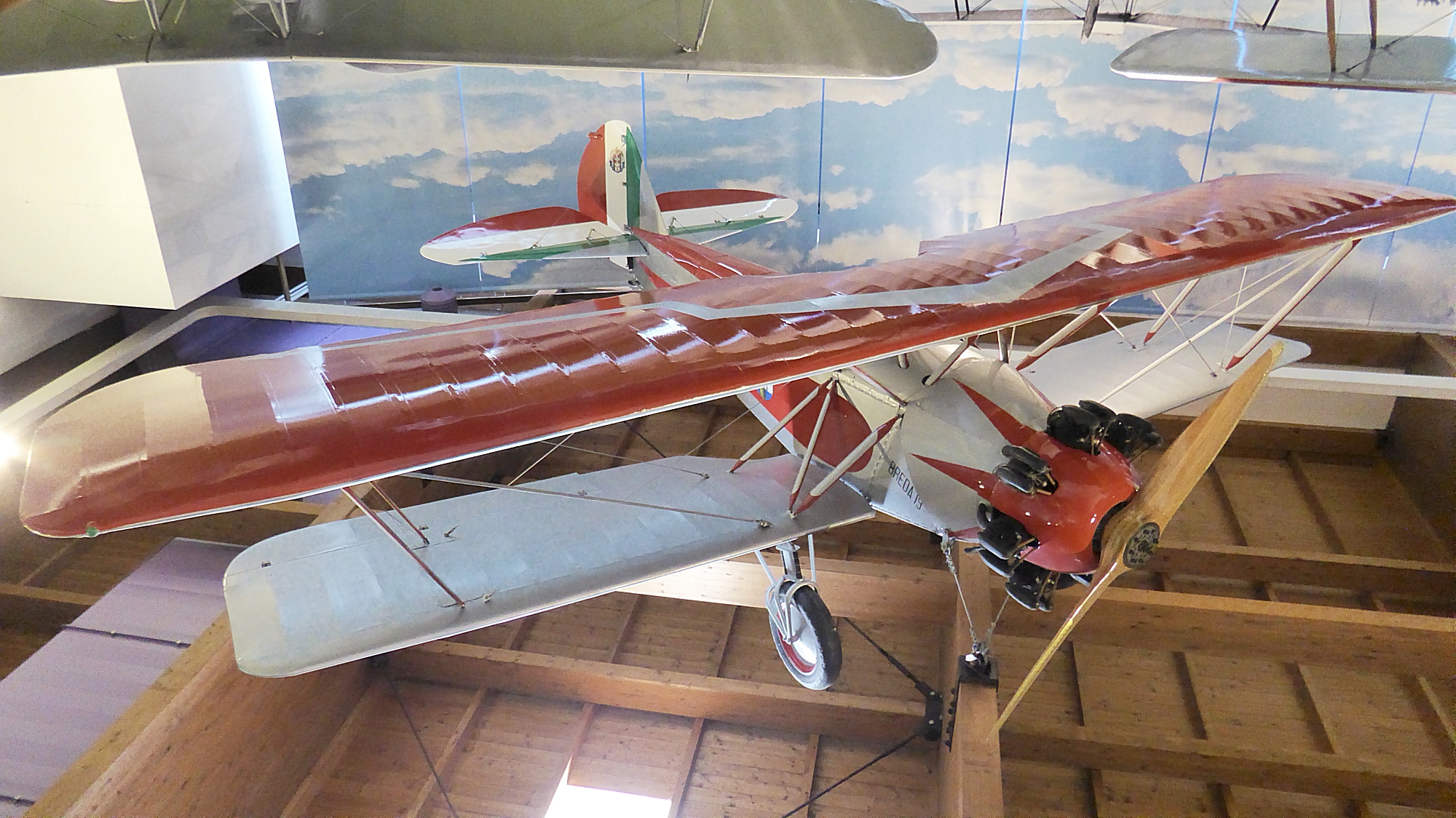
The sole surviving Breda Ba.19, at the Caproni Museum, Trento, Italy.

== Operators ==
Kingdom of Italy

- Regia Aeronautica
  - Squadriglia di Alta Acrobazia Aerea

== Specifications ==
General characteristics

- Crew: 1, pilot
- Length: 6.60 m (21 ft 8 in)
- Wingspan: 9.00 m (29 ft 6 in)
- Height: 2.20 m (7 ft 3 in)
- Wing area: 25.0 m^{2} (269 sq ft)
- Empty weight: 735 kg (1,620 lb)
- Powerplant: 1 × Alfa Romeo licence-built Armstrong Siddeley Lynx radial , 149 kW (200 hp)

Performance

- Maximum speed: 210 km/h (131 mph, 114 kn)
- Range: 840 km (522 mi, 454 nmi)
- Service ceiling: 7,000 m (22,960 ft)

== See also ==
Related lists

- List of aerobatic aircraft
