= Flyhistorisk Museum, Sola =

Aviation museum in Sola, Norway

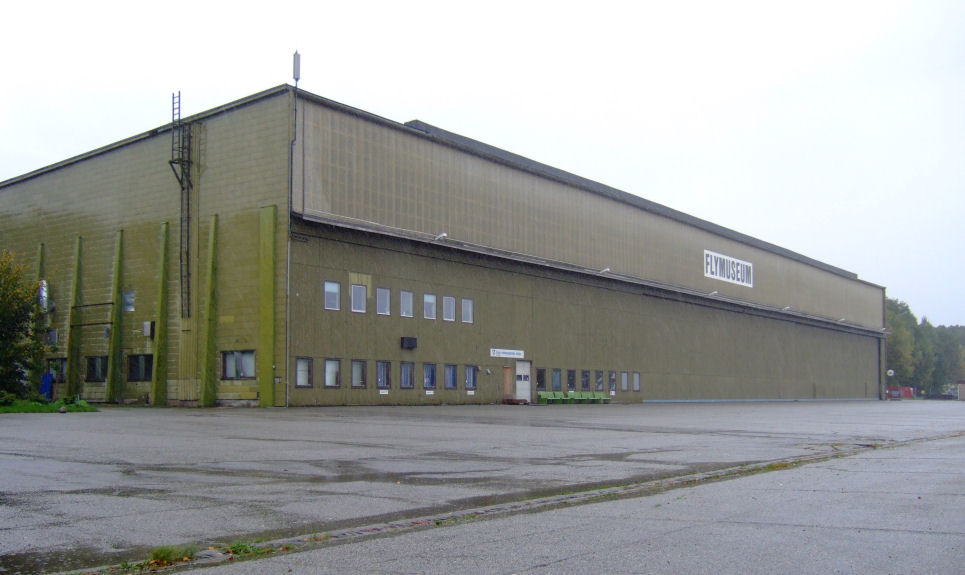

- Location within Norway
- Location: Sola, Rogaland
- Coordinates: 58.8979°N 5.6314°E
- Type: Aviation museum
- Website: www.flymuseum-sola.no

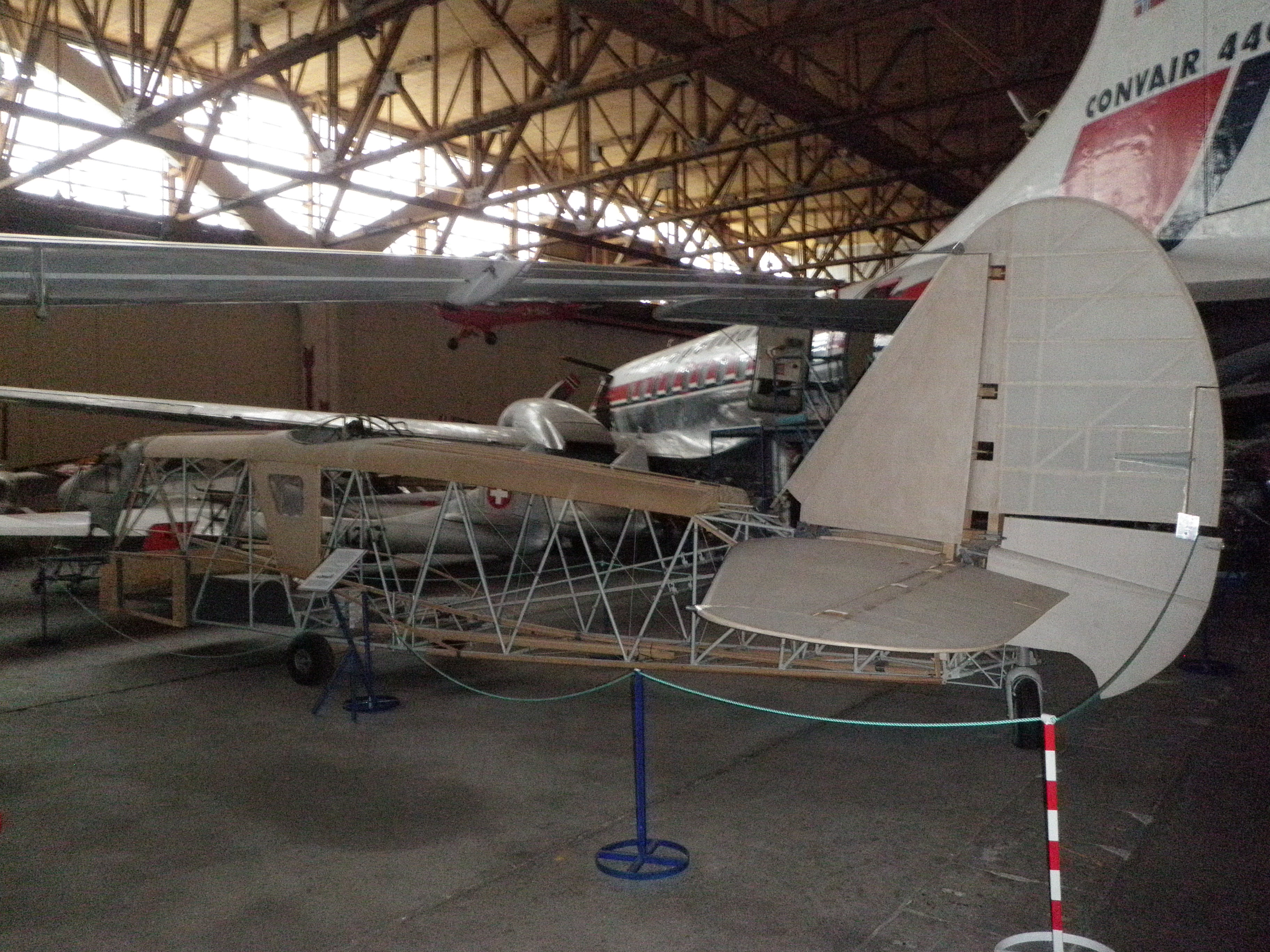
This partially restored Caproni Ca.310 bomber is displayed at the museum.

The Flyhistorisk Museum ("Aviation Museum") is located at the seaplane base near Stavanger Airport, Sola in Rogaland, and is part of the Jærmuseet regional museum. The facility is a hangar built by the Germans during World War II. After the war, the Royal Norwegian Air Force took over the hangar for the maintenance of military aviation equipment. The museum was founded in 1984, initially occupying just a corner of the hangar. Over time, the museum has expanded to take over two-thirds of the building, which it currently shares with the aviation mechanics program of Sola Upper Secondary School.

The museum chronicles Norwegian aviation history, with a special focus on the Cold War and World War II, often through a local lens. Several of the aircraft on display are the only surviving examples of their type in the world, such as the museum's Caproni Ca. 310 and Heinkel He 115. For other aircraft on display, only a couple or very few surviving examples exist worldwide.

In addition to the aircraft, the exhibition features a variety of wreckage remains, as well as weapons, models, and other artifacts. The aviation museum also has an active friends association (volunteer association).

== Aircraft on display ==
=== Military aircraft ===
- Arado Ar 96B-1
- Arado Ar 196
- Caproni Ca.310 CA-310
- Consolidated PBY Catalina
- de Havilland DH 82 Tiger Moth 151
- Fairchild PT-26 Cornell
- Fieseler Fi 156 Storch (in World War II Luftwaffe colors)
- Heinkel He 115
- Messerschmitt Bf 109
- Saab Safirc/n 91336

=== Civilian ===
- Aero Grand Commander 680, formerly used by the Norwegian Environmental Protection Agency (Statens Forurensingstilsyn)
- Aerodyne Vector 610
- Convair CV-440 Metropolitan, LN-KLK in the colors of Norsk Metropolitan Klubb. Used by SAS and Norfly
- De Havilland DH-114 Heron 1B, in the colors of Braathens S.A.F.E. ex. Garuda Indonesia PH-GHB and BUIA G-AOXL
- DFS Olympia Meise LN-SCA ex.LZ+ET
- DFS 38 Schulgleider 610
- Eon Baby Type 8 (glider) c/n 018 LN-GBI
- Fokker F.27 Friendship 100, LN-SUF, used by Braathens S.A.F.E and Busy Bee
- Hols`s der Teufel, "Mehank II"
- Noorduyn Norseman, c/n 92 LN-BDR used by RNoAF and Fjellfly!
- Piel CP.301 Emmeraude
- Piper PA-38 Tomahawk
- Scheibe Bergfalke (glider) c/n 202 LN-GBH

=== Helicopter ===
- Aérospatiale SA 332 Super Puma LN-OMC
- Bell 47, in the colours of Helikopter Service
- Bell UH-1B 61-0688
- Westland Sea King WA746, 060

=== Outdoor exhibitions ===
- Canadair CF-104 Starfighter
- Douglas DC-6, LN-SUB, used by Braathens S.A.F.E. ex. N151 with Everts Air Cargo
- Funkmessortungsgerät FuMo 214 «Würzburg-Riese»
- NM-116
- Saab RF-35 Draken
