= Caproni Ca.355 =

Italian WWII dive bomber

Ca.355 Tuffo
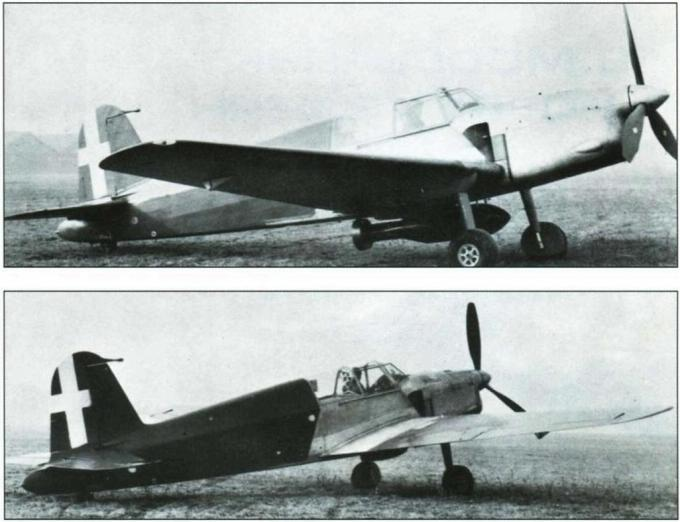
- Two views of the Caproni Ca.355, note the bomb mounted under the centerline

General information
- Type: Dive bomber
- National origin: Italy
- Manufacturer: Caproni
- Designer: Cesare Pallavicino
- Number built: 1

History
- First flight: 14 January 1941
- Developed from: Caproni Ca.335

The Caproni Ca.355 Tuffo was a low-wing single-engine dive bomber, designed and built by the Italian Caproni company in 1941, which never proceeded beyond a single prototype. Derived from Ca.335 Mistral, the Ca.355 was proposed to equip the Regia Aeronautica, but it was found to offer little advantage over the German Junkers Ju 87 "Stuka" and the project was abandoned.

== Development ==
In 1939 the Ministry of Aeronautics issued a specification for the supply of an aircraft of the same class as the Junkers Ju 87 to be allocated to the bomber divisions of the Regia Aeronautica.

Caproni chose to participate with a project entrusted to engineer Cesare Pallavicino and developed by his subsidiary, Cantieri Aeronautici Bergamaschi (CAB). Pallavicino exploited the experience gained in the development of the previous Ca.335 Maestrale, proposing a simplified development with slightly smaller dimensions and with minor modifications to make it suitable for the new role.

The fuselage was reduced in diameter and the second cockpit was eliminated as being unnecessary, leaving only a single enclosed cockpit with a rearward sliding canopy. Air brakes were added to the wing and, as with the Stuka, a tubular trapeze was included to hold the bomb and ensure it cleared the propeller when dropped during a vertical dive. The Isotta Fraschini Delta engine developed by another company in the Caproni group was chosen to power it.

The prototype, serial MM.470 and now designated Ca.355 Tuffo, was flown by test pilot Ettore Wengi on 14 January 1941 from the company airfield at Ponte San Pietro. After initial trials in which no major problems were found, it was delivered to the Regia Aeronautica. While satisfying the original requirements, the military were not satisfied with its performance and it only carried out a few test flights. The Regia Aeronautica chose to continue operating the Junkers Ju 87 "Stuka", in addition to converting obsolete fighters such as the Fiat CR.42, Fiat G.50 Freccia and the Macchi MC.200 to the dive bombing role. The fate of the sole Ca.355 built is unknown.

== Variants ==
Ca.355

Main variant, one prototype built.

Ca.355 Twin-tail

A proposed variant with two engines in a push-pull configuration, the rear engine mounted between twin tail booms. The Daimler-Benz DB 601 or Isotta Fraschini Delta were proposed as powerplants.

Caproni Ca.357

Proposed variant with Daimler-Benz DB601 engine

Caproni Ca.358

Proposed variant with Isotta Fraschini Zeta engine

== Specifications ==
Data from Airwar.ru

General characteristics

- Crew: two
- Length: 9.93 m (32 ft 7 in)
- Wingspan: 12.96 m (42 ft 6 in)
- Empty weight: 1,980 kg (4,365 lb)
- Gross weight: 3,050 kg (6,724 lb)
- Powerplant: 1 × Isotta Fraschini Delta IV R.C.35 liquid-cooled V12 engine, 625 kW (850 hp) take-off power
- Propellers: 3-bladed bladed constant speed

Performance

- Maximum speed: 490 km/h (300 mph, 260 kn) at 7,400 m
- Cruise speed: 380 km/h (240 mph, 210 kn)
- Range: 1,025 km (637 mi, 553 nmi)

Armament

- Guns:
  - 2× 7.7 mm or 12.7 mm Breda-SAFAT machine guns in the wings (planned)
  - 1× 7.7 mm Breda-SAFAT machine gun in the dorsal pannier (planned)
- Bombs: 400 kg (800 lb) under wings and fuselage
