= Heinkel He 115 =

1937 multi-role floatplane family by Heinkel

He 115
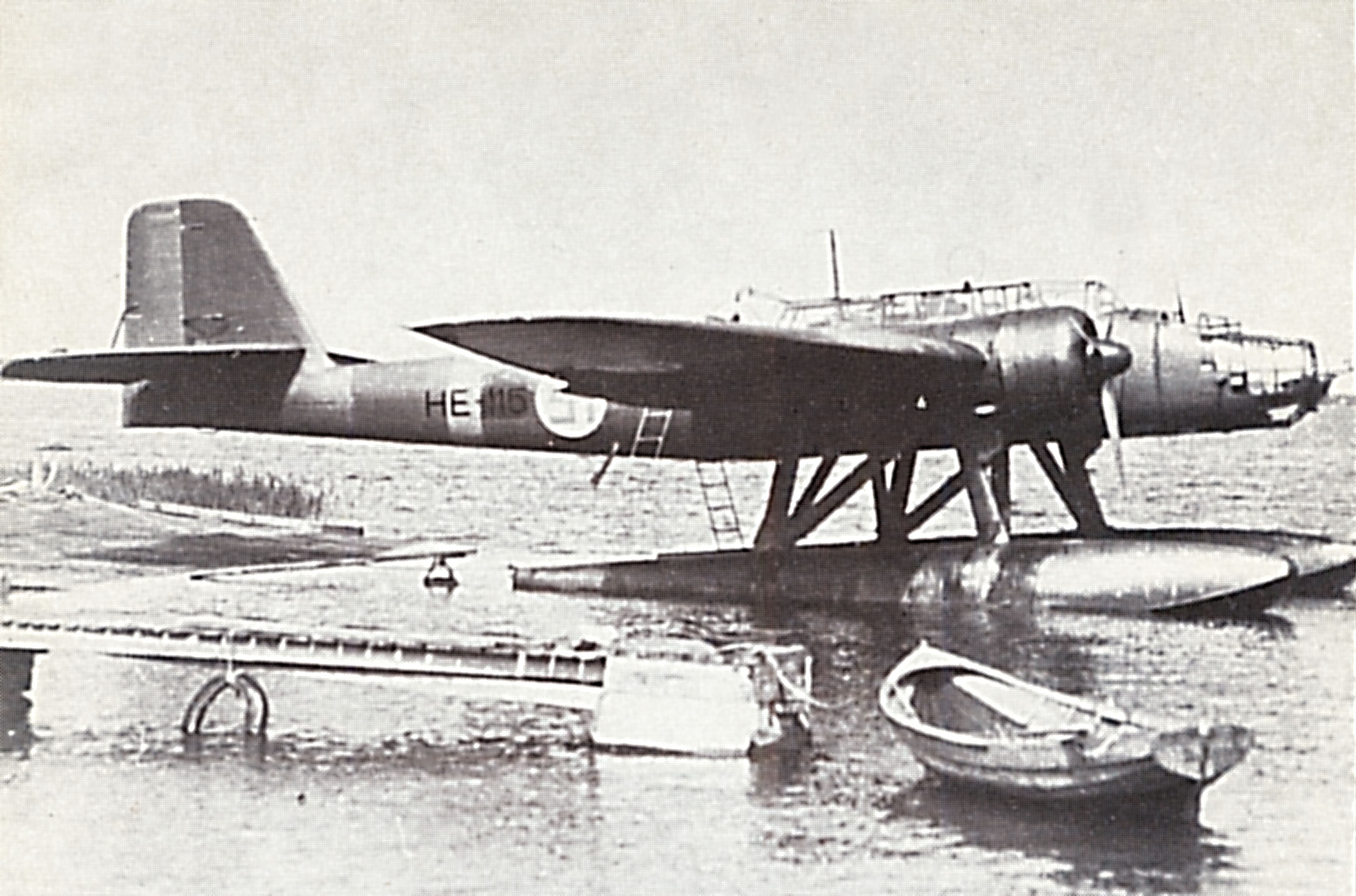
- Finnish Air Force He 115 N

General information
- Type: Torpedo bomber seaplane
- Manufacturer: Heinkel
- Status: Retired
- Primary users: Luftwaffe Royal Norwegian Navy Air Service; Swedish Air Force; Royal Air Force; Finnish Air Force
- Number built: 138

History
- Introduction date: 1939
- First flight: August 1937

The Heinkel He 115 was an all-metal twin-engined military seaplane designed and produced by the German aircraft manufacturer Heinkel. Early on its flying history, the He 115 established several new international records for floatplanes.

The He 115 was developed during the latter half of the 1930s in response to a requirement issued by the German Reichsluftfahrtministerium (RLM). Heinkel opted to design a three-seat seaplane that could function as a torpedo bomber, reconnaissance aircraft and minelayer. The initial model of the aircraft, the first prototype of which performed its maiden flight in August 1937, was powered by a pair of 960 PS (947 hp, 720 kW) BMW 132K nine-cylinder air-cooled radial engines. Subsequent models varied in several respects, such as being equipped with different engines or alternative armament arrangements, increased fuel capacity or payload, and some He 115s could even accommodate an additional crew member.

The He 115 saw active combat with multiple operators, particularly during its service with the Luftwaffe during the Second World War. Early on in the conflict, German He 115s frequently deployed mines within British waters. It proved itself to be a capable anti-shipping platform, particularly against Arctic supply convoys. Other nations flew the He 115, the majority being Scandinavian. The Royal Norwegian Navy Air Service operated a number that flew missions against the German invasion of Norway; several survivors escaped the occupation by flying to the UK, where they continued to be flown against the Germans until they were lost. By the twenty-first century, while a few airframes have survived, none are currently on display to the public and none are flightworthy.

== Development and design ==
The origins of the He 115 can be traced back to 1935 and the issuing of a requirement by the German Reichsluftfahrtministerium (RLM) that called for a twin engined general purpose floatplane, suitable for maritime patrol and anti-shipping strikes with both bombs and torpedoes. Numerous aircraft manufacturers responded with their own proposals, including Heinkel Flugzeugwerke and the Blohm & Voss aircraft subsidiary Hamburger Flugzeugbau. On 1 November 1935, orders were placed with both Heinkel and Hamburger Flugzeugbau to produce three prototypes of their prospective designs, designated the He 115 and the Ha 140 respectively.

In terms of its general configuration, the He 115 was an all-metal mid-wing monoplane with a monocoque fuselage. It was equipped with a pair of floats, each of which was attached to the underside of the engine nacelles via a large strut. The twin-spar wing was built in three sections. It featured a stepped cockpit along with a rear-facing observation compartment. Initially, the He 115's armament consisted of two 7.92 mm (.312 in) MG 15 machine guns, one in the nose and one in the dorsal position. On later-build He 115s, the typical armament fitted included a fixed forward-firing 15 mm or 20 mm MG 151 cannon and two rearward-firing 7.92 mm (.312 in) MG 17 machine guns in the engine nacelles. Furthermore, some variants carried LTF 5 or LTF 6b torpedoes and SD 500 500 kg (1,100 lb) or SC 250 250 kg (550 lb) bombs, while others carried LMB III or LMA mines.

During August 1937, the first prototype He 115 performed its maiden flight. Flight testing went relatively smoothly, the type's flight characteristics proving to be quite favourable. In early 1938, the He 115 was selected over the rival Ha 140, thus securing a second order for another prototype and 10 pre-production aircraft. According to aviation historian Hans Amtmann, Hamburger Flugzeugbau did not have enough spare manufacturing capacity for series production and declined the order, leading to Heinkel's selection instead. During March of that year, the first prototype was used to establish a series of international records for floatplanes over 1,000 km (620 mi) and 2,000 km (1,200 mi) closed circuits at a speed of 328 km/h (204 mph). Prior to these records being set, the prototype had been modified to achieve greater aerodynamic performance, such as the deletion of the angular glazed nose and the rear compartment, which were replaced by fairings.

The third and fourth prototypes including a continuous glazed canopy (between the windshield and the rear position) and angled bracing struts between the vertical struts attached to the floats respectively. In 1937, ten pre-production He 115s were completed; deliveries of production standard aircraft to the Luftwaffe commenced one year later. The He 115A-3 was the first variant to be produced in quantity, it differed from earlier models by having a revised bomb bay and radio apparatus. During 1939, the improved HE 115B-1, which featured a more than 50 percent increase in fuel capacity, was introduced.

While production came to an end during the first half of the Second World War, the He 115 was highly regarded, to the extent that production was resumed in 1943, despite an increasingly large proportion of German's aircraft manufacturing capacity being allocated to defensive fighter aircraft instead.

== Operational history ==
=== Luftwaffe ===
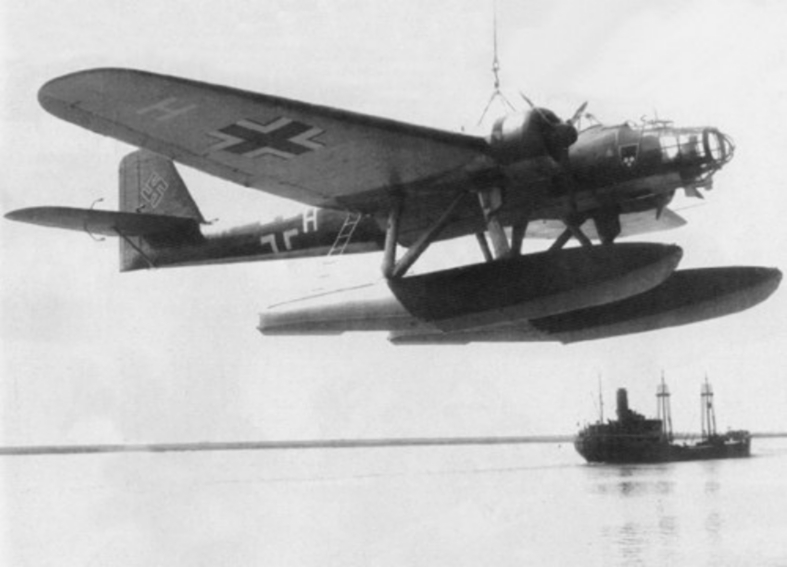
A German Heinkel He 115B of 1./Küstenfliegergruppe 206 on a crane.

Throughout the Second World War, the primary mission of the Luftwaffe's He 115s was to conduct minelaying, typically during night time to lower the likelihood of interception. Following the first such mission on 20 November 1939, the He 115 was frequently used for dropping (typically via parachute) magnetic mines in British waters, normally aiming for narrow passages close to busy ports on the English south coast; the River Thames was also a prime target. These mining efforts supplemented the efforts of the Kriegsmarine. The island of Sylt was used as a base for He 115s performing these missions; in response, it became a target for Allied bombing missions.

Perhaps the most effective missions performed by the He 115 were its anti-shipping operations against Arctic convoys, for which it operated out of bases in occupied northern Norway. Due to early convoys lacking any air cover, the slow and lightly armed He 115 was less vulnerable during these attacks than it was when operating near to the English coast. Following the appearance of carriers and escort carriers, coupled with the arrival of new Soviet heavy fighters like the Petlyakov Pe-3bis, Luftwaffe air superiority over the convoys was challenged and losses increased.

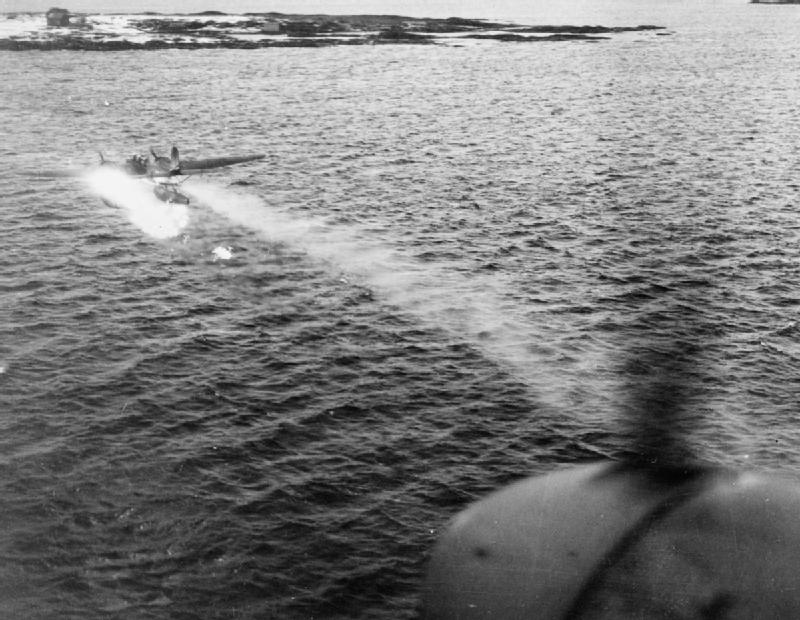
He 115 shot down by de Havilland Mosquito.

Apart from its use as a minelayer and torpedo bomber, the He 115 was used for coastal reconnaissance and by KG 200 to drop agents behind enemy lines.

=== Royal Norwegian Navy Air Service ===
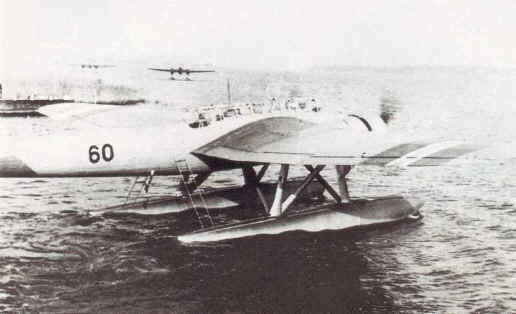
Norwegian He 115Ns in 1939–1940.

In response to the rising tensions in Europe, the Norwegian Ministry of Defence had ordered six He 115Ns for the Royal Norwegian Navy Air Service (RNoNAS) on 28 August 1939 and the aircraft were delivered from 14 July – 13 November 1939. The He 115N order was intended to replace the RNoNAS fleet of 1920s vintage Douglas DT torpedo bombers and the obsolescent Marinens Flyvebaatfabrikk M.F.11, which was the mainstay of the RNoNAS in 1940. The Norwegians signed another order of six He 115Ns in December 1939, with delivery expected in March/April 1940 but this was forestalled by Operation Weserübung, the German invasion of Norway of 9 April 1940. At the outbreak of hostilities, the RNoNAS had six He 115Ns in service (F.50, F.52, F.54, F.56, F.58 and F.60) spread along the coast from the naval air stations at Sola and Flatøy in the south to the one at Skattøra Naval Air Station outside Tromsø in the north. At the beginning of the German invasion, the aircraft at the seaplane base at Hafrsfjord near Stavanger (F.60) was captured by the Germans, but two Luftwaffe He 115s (given the codes F.62 and F.64 in Norwegian service) were seized by an improvised militia unit of Norwegian riflemen at Ørnes in Glomfjord, Nordland and by police officers at Brønnøysund, Nordland. The two aircraft were seized after they ran out of fuel and had to make emergency landings on 10 April. Manned by Norwegian aircrews, they served against their former owners for the duration of the campaign.

Seven Norwegian He 115s, five of them He 115Ns, were employed against German and German-controlled ships (see: HNoMS Uller), as well as providing ground support to the Norwegian Army offensive on the Narvik Front. On 14 April 1940, three Norwegian He 115s made a successful attack on German Ju 52s at Gullesfjordbotn. Four of the Norwegian aircraft (F.52, F.56, F.58 and F.64) made the journey to the United Kingdom shortly before the 10 June 1940 surrender, a fifth (F.50) escaping to Finland, landing on Lake Salmijärvi in Petsamo. A sixth He 115 (F.54) also tried to make the journey to Britain but was lost over the North Sea. The last of the Norwegian He 115s, F.62 (one of the two captured German aircraft), was unserviceable at the time of the evacuation and was abandoned at Skattøra, later being repaired and flown by the Germans.

=== Royal Air Force ===
The four escaped aircraft were reformed into the Norwegian Helensburgh Group under Commander Bugge. The exiled Norwegian Cabinet Nygaardsvold made plans shortly after arriving in Britain to use the four He 115s to perform leaflet dropping missions over Norway. This leaflet mission was to deliver a declaration to the Norwegian people, stating the Norwegian authorities were re-established in the UK and rejected any Nazi German overtures for a German–Norwegian peace deal. All four Norwegian He 115s were ordered from Helensburgh to Scapa Flow on 3 July 1940 to carry out the mission, although one had to return to Helensburgh due to engine problems. The three He 115s assembled at Scapa Flow were ordered to fly to Norway and drop the declaration over the cities of Oslo, Bergen and Trondheim. Shortly before the mission was to get under way, the British Air Ministry intervened and stopped the expedition, insisting that such an undertaking would be suicidal to attempt with the slow flying He 115s. Three days later, the aircraft returned to Helensburgh.

Three of the Norwegian He 115s (F.56, F.58 and F.64) were subsequently used in covert operations off Norway and in the Mediterranean Sea with Norwegian crews. In British service, the three received new serial numbers, BV184, BV185 and BV187. BV184 was attacked and damaged by two Polish Spitfire fighters over the Bay of Biscay in the spring of 1942, while co-operating with French fishing boats and later lost in a refuelling fire in the UK. BV185 was destroyed in an Italian air raid on Kalafrana, Malta after flying just one clandestine operation to North Africa. BV187 flew several missions on the North African coast from its base in Malta before being destroyed by a pair of German Bf 109s.

=== Finnish Air Force ===
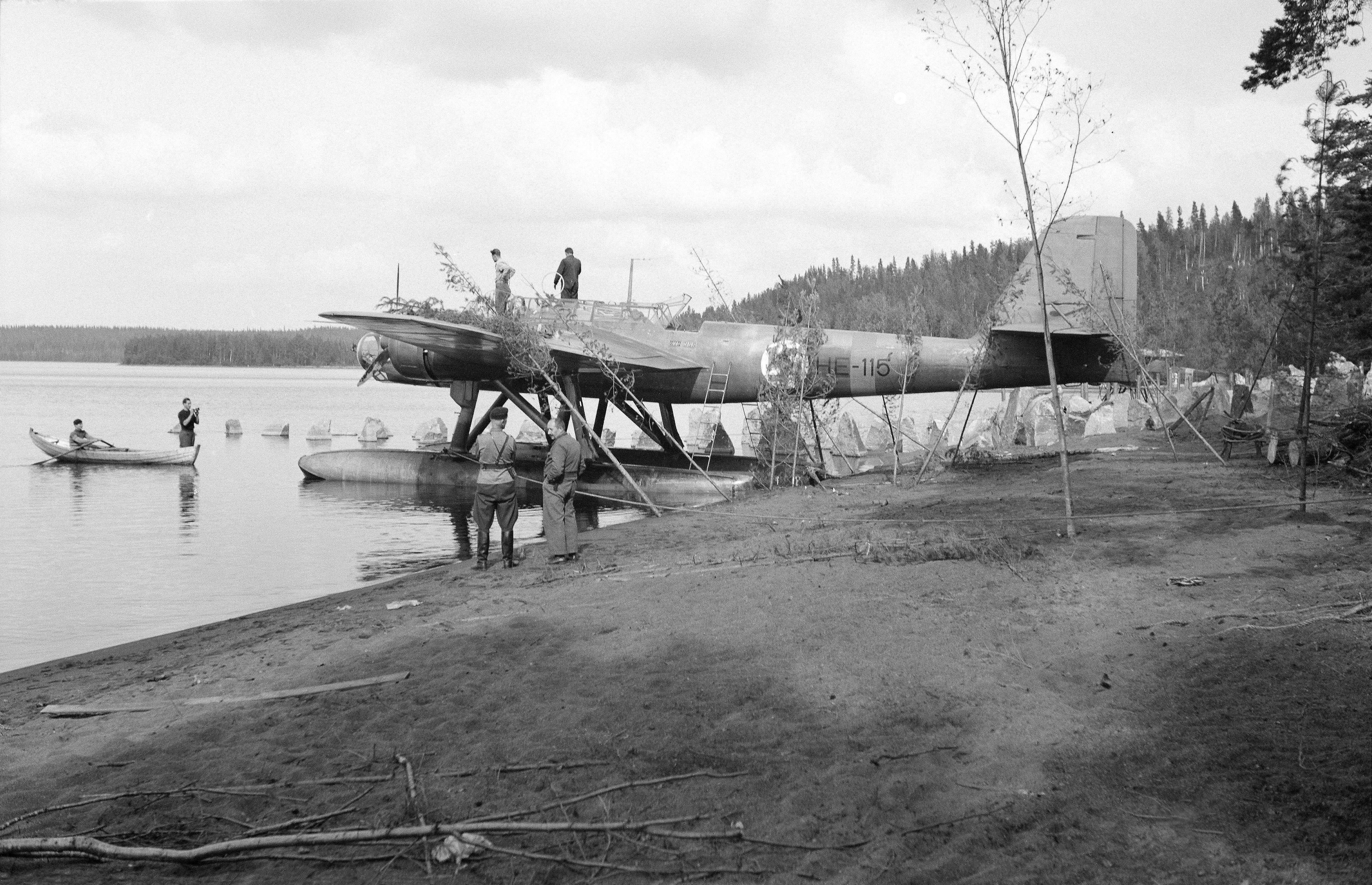
Heinkel He 115A of LeLv 15 on lake Höytiäinen. August 1941.

On 8 June 1940, the day after Norwegian forces were ordered to cease hostilities, one He 115 (F.50, deemed technically unfit to be flown to the UK), was flown to Finland posing as a civilian aircraft LN-MAB. The floatplane was interned but the pilot, experienced line captain and naval lieutenant Helge Dahl and crew were free to leave Finland. From Summer 1941, it was used by the LLv.14 of the Finnish Air Force code HE-115 and named "Jenny", to ferry Sissi troops behind Soviet lines. In this role, it proved valuable in a terrain with numerous secluded lakes. It served in this role until ambushed in East Karelia on 4 July 1943. Jenny took off but soon had to ditch and the crew was taken prisoner. Two days later the floating HE-115 was strafed by Finnish Morane-Saulnier MS.406 fighters. There are reports that the Soviets salvaged the wreck for evaluation. A pair of Luftwaffe He 115 C were borrowed for similar operations in 1943–44 and operated with German markings by Finnish crew. One was returned in 1944 but the other was surrendered to the Soviets after the signing of the Moscow Armistice.

=== Swedish Air Force ===
The Swedish Air Force operated 12 He 115A-2s under the local designation T 2, with Air Force numbers 101–112. Another six aircraft were ordered but never delivered due to the outbreak of the Second World War. They were sturdy and well liked by their crews and were not taken out of use until 1952. The Swedish T 2s were kept on duty throughout the Second World War and made a valuable contribution to protecting and enforcing Swedish neutrality. The T 2s replaced the outdated T 1s (Heinkel HD 16s) as torpedo bombers and also served as regular bombers, for smoke screening and for long-range reconnaissance missions. Five of the 12 T 2s were lost in accidents during their service with the Swedish Air Force.

== Variants ==
=== Prototypes ===
Five prototypes were used in the development of the aircraft,

- He 115 V1 August 1937, set eight payload/speed records
- He 115 V2 November 1937, similar to V1
- He 115 V3 March 1938, introduced glassed cockpit, which became standard
- He 115 V4 May 1938, production prototype, introduced struts in place of wires between the fuselage and floats
- He 115 V5 1939

=== Production ===
The basic design of the aircraft remained unchanged during the type's career. The main differences, with a few notable exceptions, were changes in armament and avionics. Also to note is that the 'new' 'E' version, launched when production restarted in 1941, is in fact similar to the 'C'-series, again with the exception of armament changes.

- He 115 A-0 10 pre-production examples, armed with a single machine gun
- He 115 A-1 added a nose-mounted machine gun.
- He 115 A-2 similar to A-1, exported to Norway and Sweden
- He 115 A-3 modified weapons bay and changes to the radio equipment
- He 115 B-0 the 'B'-series introduced the ability to trade fuel and bomb load, as well as the possibility to carry a 1,000 kg (2,200 lb) magnetic mine
- He 115 B-1 added increased fuel capacity
  - He 115 B-1/R1
  - He 115 B-1/R2
  - He 115 B-1/R3
- He 115 B-2 had reinforced floats for operation from ice or snow
- He 115 C-1 introduced additional armament
  - He 115 C-1/R1
  - He 115 C-1/R2
  - He 115 C-1/R3
  - He 115 C-1/R4
- He 115 C-2 reinforced floats in same manner as B-2
- He 115 C-3 minelayer version.
- He 115 C-4 torpedo bomber version.
- He 115 D one aircraft fitted with BMW 801C engines rated at 1,147 kW (1,560 PS) each.
- He 115 E-1 similar to the 'C'-series, but with revised armament.

== Operators ==
Finland

- Ilmavoimat

(Nazi Germany) Germany

- Luftwaffe

Norway

- Royal Norwegian Navy Air Service

Spanish State

- Aviación Nacional

Sweden

- Svenska flygvapnet

United Kingdom

- Royal Air Force

== Surviving aircraft ==
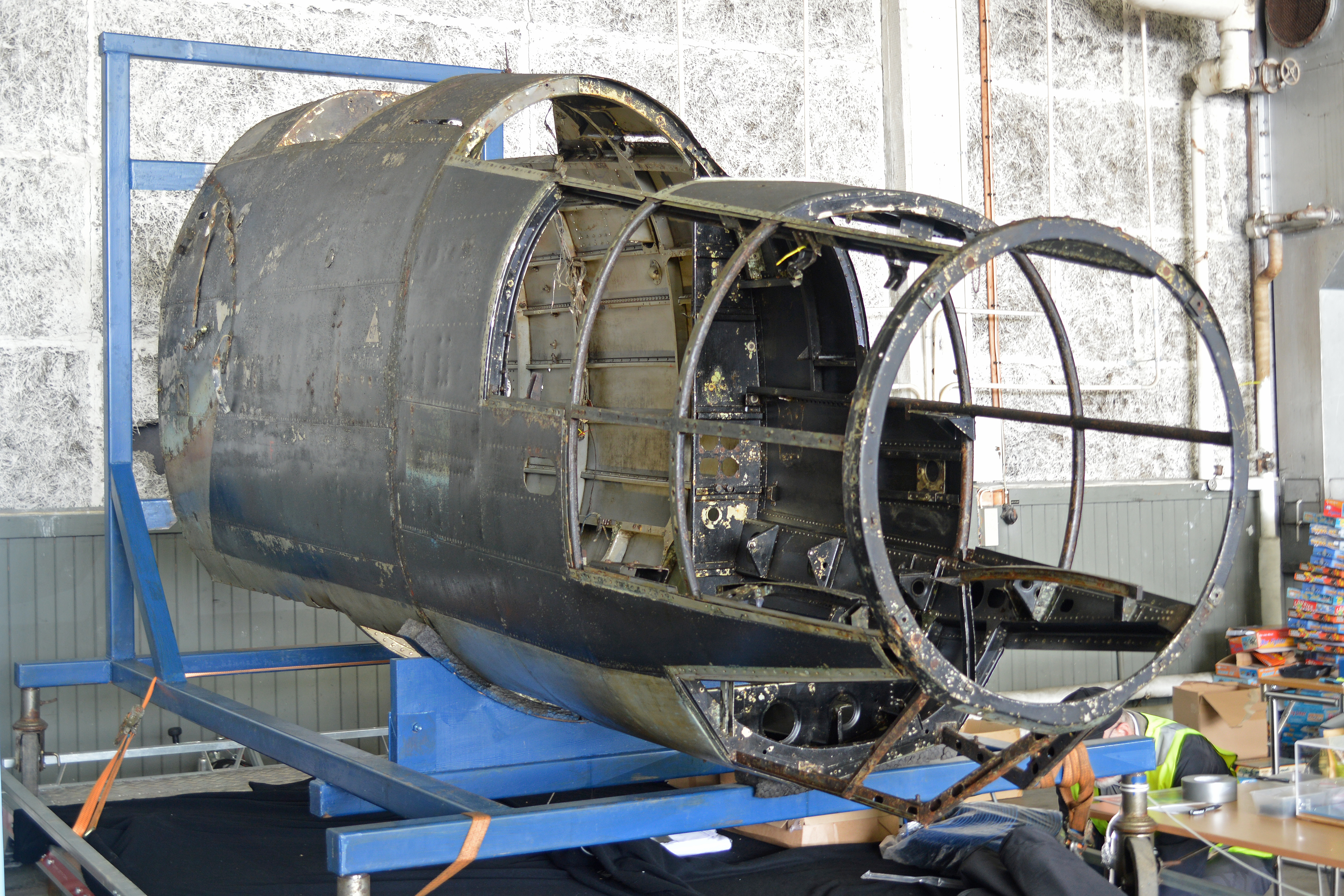
Heinkel He 115 in restoration at the Flyhistorisk Museum, Sola.

- He 115 A-2 Werknr. 3043? Recovered from Russia, now in storage with private owner in France.
- He 115 B/C Werknr. 2398 sunk to the bottom of a fjord on 26 December 1942 and was recovered from Hafrsfjord in Norway on 2 June 2012. It was part of 1 Staffel, Seefernaufklärungsgruppe 906 (No. 1 Squadron, 906 Maritime Reconnaissance Group), known until February 1941 as Küstenfliegergruppe 906 (906 Coastal Aviation Group), Luftflotte 5. In July 2012, the aircraft was in storage awaiting restoration at the Flyhistorisk Museum, Sola near Stavanger.
- The wreck of a He 115 was located at the bottom of the lake Limingen in Nord-Trøndelag, Norway in 2013.

== Specifications (He 115 B-1) ==
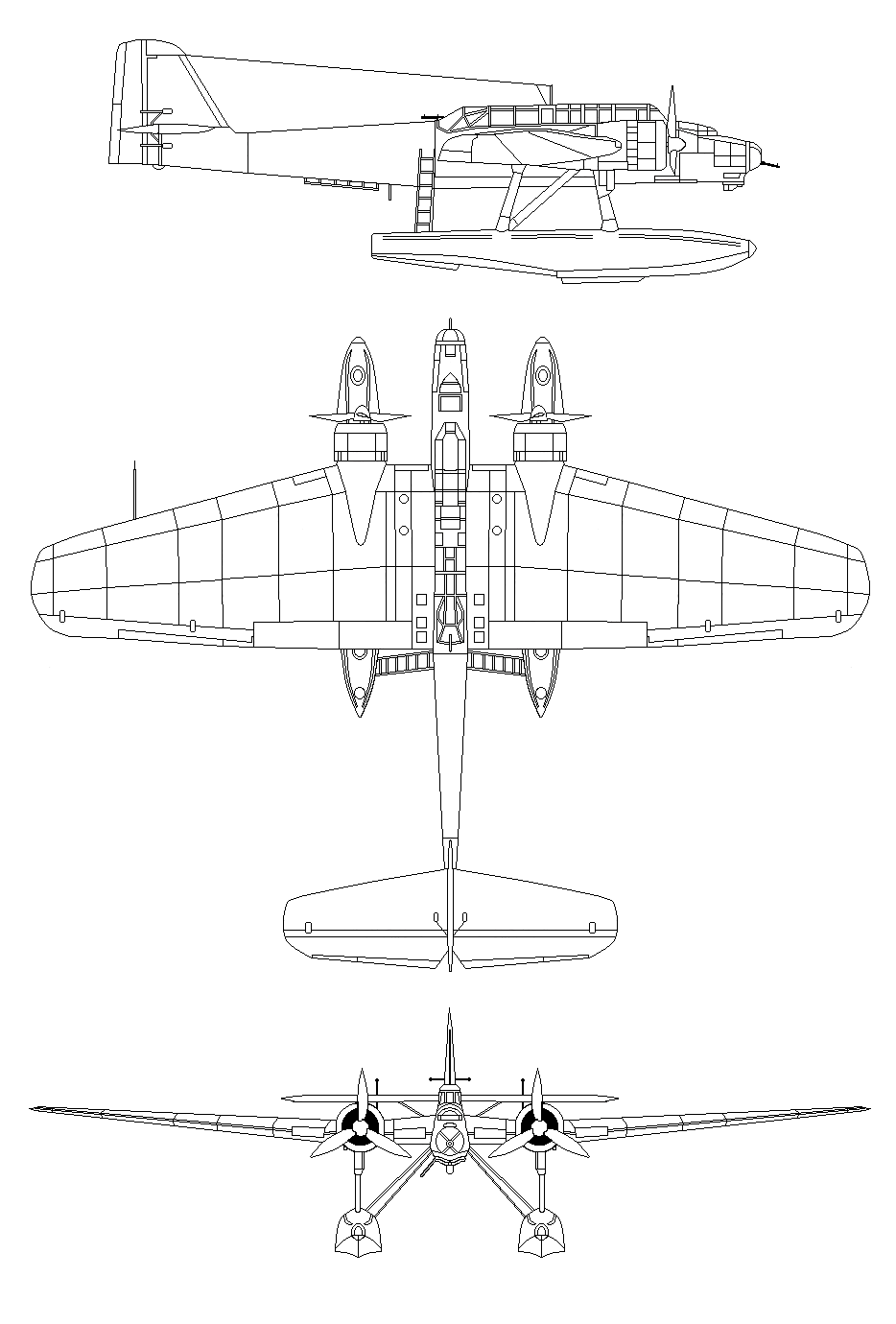
He 115

Data from Fighters and Bombers of World War II

General characteristics

- Crew: three
- Length: 17.3 m (56 ft 9 in)
- Wingspan: 22.28 m (73 ft 1 in)
- Height: 6.6 m (21 ft 8 in)
- Wing area: 87.5 m^{2} (942 sq ft)
- Airfoil: root: NACA 2221
- Empty weight: 5,290 kg (11,662 lb)
- Gross weight: 10,400 kg (22,928 lb)
- Powerplant: 2 × BMW 132K nine-cylinder air-cooled radial piston engines 960 PS (950 hp; 710 kW)
- Propellers: 3-bladed variable-pitch propellers

Performance

- Maximum speed: 327 km/h (203 mph, 177 kn)
- Combat range: 2,100 km (1,300 mi, 1,100 nmi)
- Service ceiling: 5,200 m (17,100 ft)
- Wing loading: 103.8 kg/m^{2} (21.3 lb/sq ft)
- Power/mass: 0.139 kW/kg (0.085 hp/lb)

Armament

- 1 × fixed 7.92 mm (.312 in) MG 17 machine gun and 1 × flexible 7.92 mm (.312 in) MG 15 machine gun in dorsal and nose positions
- Five × 250 kg (550 lb) bombs or two such bombs and one torpedo of 800 kg (1,800 lb)
- One 920 kg (2,030 lb) sea mine.

== See also ==
Aircraft of comparable role, configuration, and era

- Fiat RS.14
- CANT Z.506
- Consolidated PBY Catalina
- Blohm & Voss Ha 140
- Hall XPTBH
- Fokker T.VIII

Related lists

- List of aircraft of World War II
- List of military aircraft of Germany
- List of military aircraft of Sweden
- List of military aircraft of Norway
- List of aircraft of the Royal Air Force
