= Caproni Ca.113 =

Military airplane

Ca.113
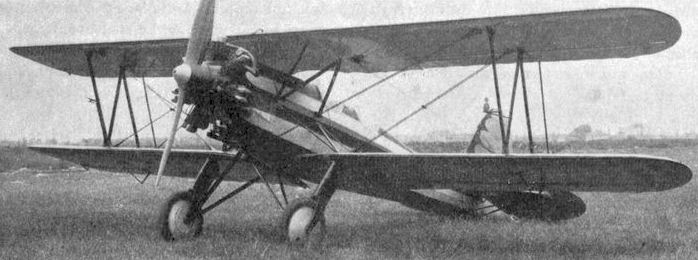

General information
- Type: Civil trainer aircraft
- Manufacturer: Caproni, Kaproni Bulgarski

History
- First flight: 1931

The Caproni Ca.113 was an advanced training biplane produced in Italy and Bulgaria in the early 1930s. Designed as a follow-on to the Ca.100, it was a more powerful and robust aircraft capable of aerobatics. It was a conventional design with two cockpits in tandem, single-bay staggered wings of equal span, and mainwheels covered by large spats.

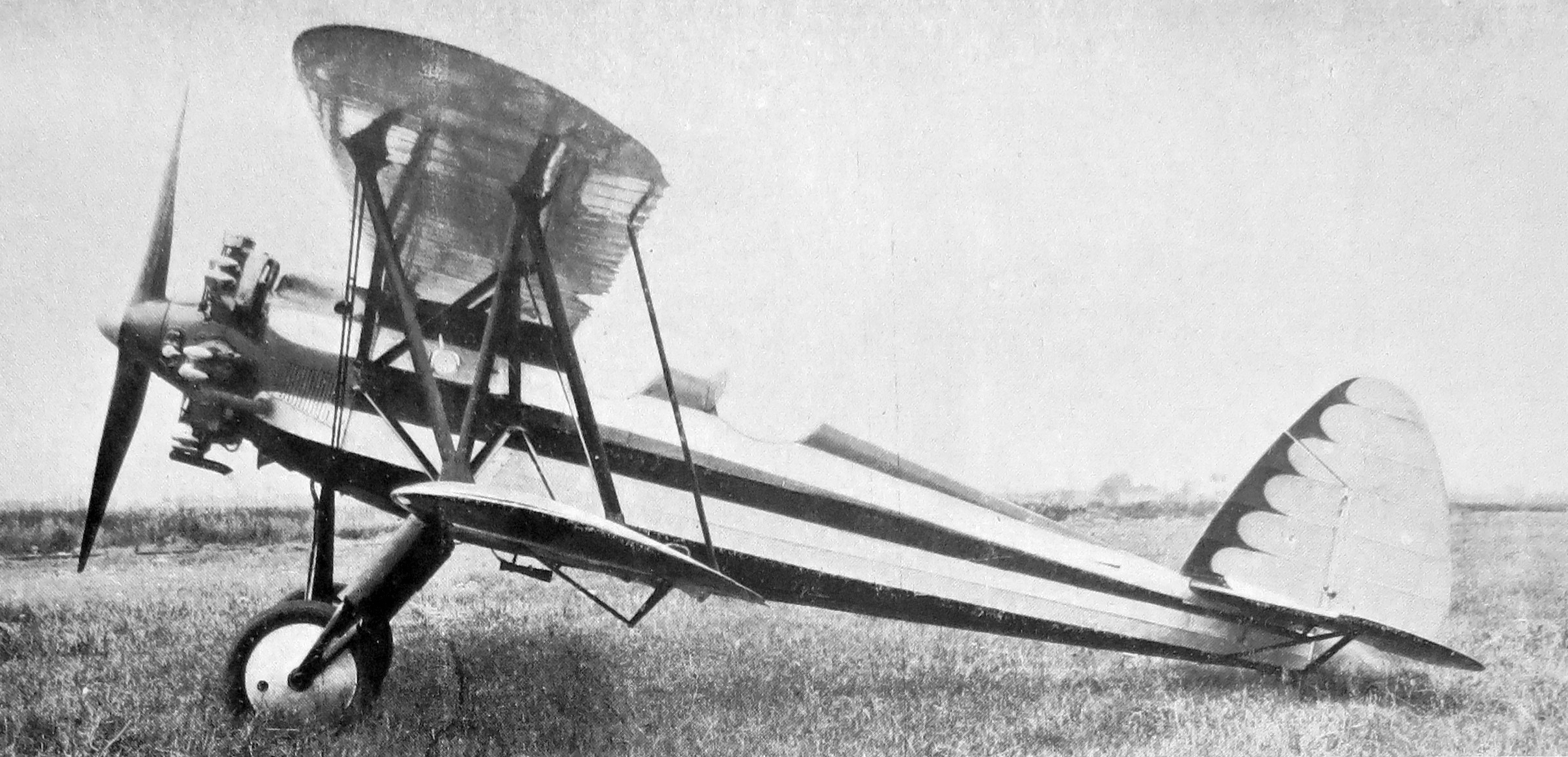
Caproni Ca.113 with Walter Castor engine, Cleveland (September 1931)

== Design and development ==
The Ca.113's capabilities were demonstrated by Mario De Bernardi's win of the aerobatic trophy at the 1931 Cleveland Air Races with a Walter Castor engine and its use in setting a number of aerial records, most importantly a world altitude record of 14,433 m (47,352 ft) set by Renato Donati on 11 April 1934 using a modified Ca.113 with longer wingspan and powered by a supercharged Alfa-Romeo-built Bristol Pegasus engine. Other records included a women's world altitude record of 12,010 m (39,400 ft) set by Contessa Carina Negrone in 1935, and world endurance records for inverted flight. These latter records were set by Tito Falconi at the US 1933 National Air Races, who flew inverted from Los Angeles to San Diego and after the race meet, made an inverted flight from St. Louis to Chicago.

Caproni Ca.113 AQ altitude record aircraft

The Ca.113 was also produced in quantity by the subsidiary that Caproni established in Kazanlak, Bulgaria. Here, it was known as the Chuchuliga ("Skylark") and was produced in a number of versions designated KB-2, KB-3, KB-4 and KB-5 in 1938–1939, some of which were armed. 107 of these aircraft were produced, most going to the Bulgarian Royal Air Force, where they saw service until the country was overrun by the Soviet Union in 1944.

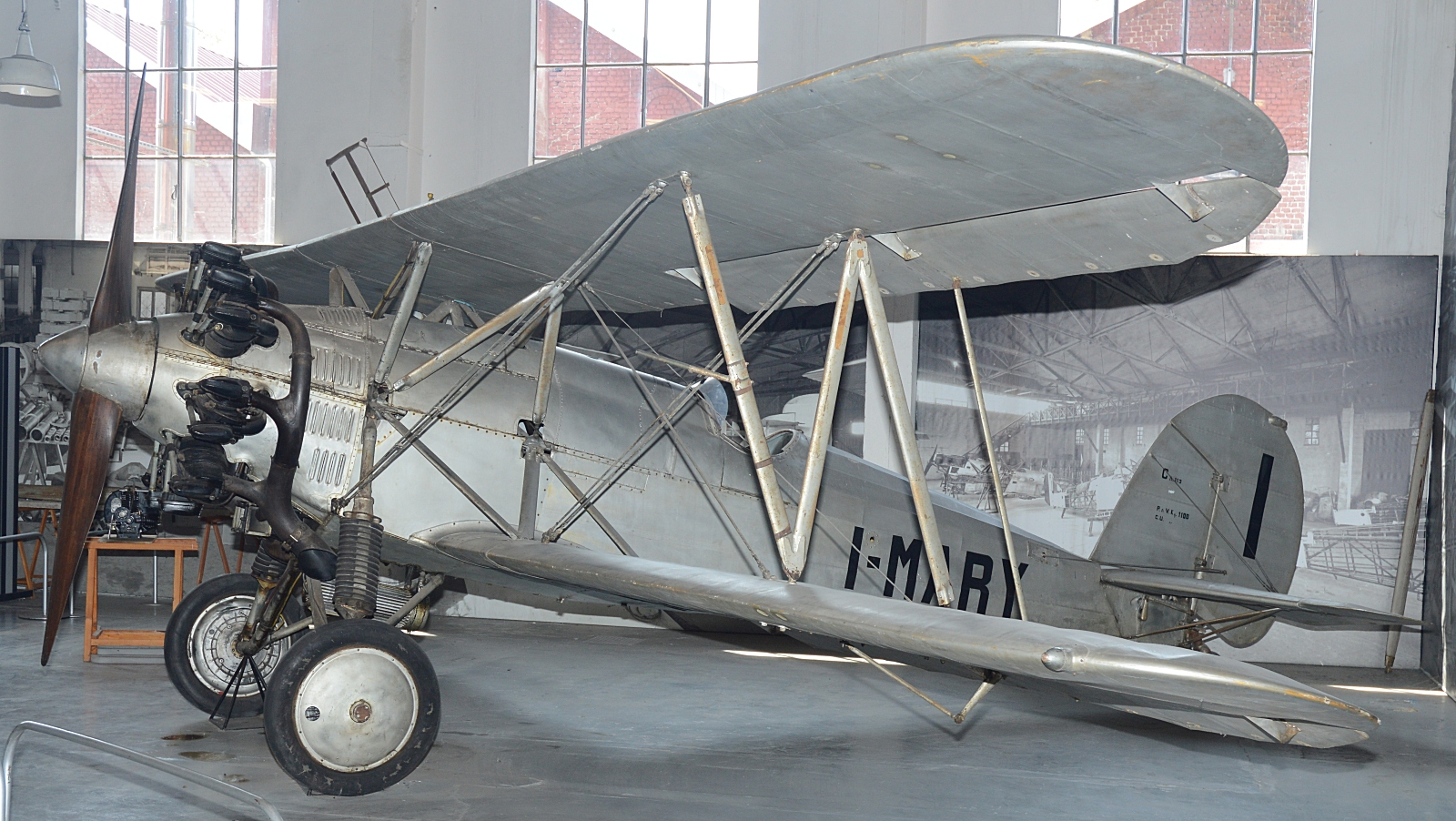
The sole surviving Ca.113, at Volandia Park and Aviation Museum, Milan Malpensa Airport, Italy

== Variants ==
KB-2UT
Bulgarian training version of Ca.113, with increased dimensions and powered by BMW IV, Junkers L2 or Hispano-Suiza engine. Italian designation of Ca.113/32. Eight built 1933–1935.
KB-2A Chuchuliga
Revised derivative of KB-2UT, powered by 260 hp (190 kW) Walter Castor radial engine. Italian designation of Ca.113/35. Six built 1936.
KB-3 Chuchuliga I
Improved trainer based on KB-2A, with lightened structure and 340 hp (250 kW) Walter Castor II engine. Italian designation Ca.113/36. Twenty built 1937.
KB-4 Chuchuliga II
Armed reconnaissance/liaison aircraft, powered by 365 hp (272 kW) Wright R-975 E-2 Whirlwind. Italian designation Ca.113/39. 28 built 1938–1939.
KB-5 Chuchuliga III
Reconnaissance/light bomber for Bulgarian Air Force. Prototype powered by 455 hp (339 kW) Piaggio P.VII C.I engine, with production aircraft powered by 450 hp (340 kW) Walter Pollux II engine. Italian designation Ca.113/40. 45 built 1939–1940.

== Operators ==
Bulgaria

- Bulgarian Air Force

Peru

- Peruvian Air Force

Portugal

- Portuguese Air Force - One aircraft

== Specifications ==
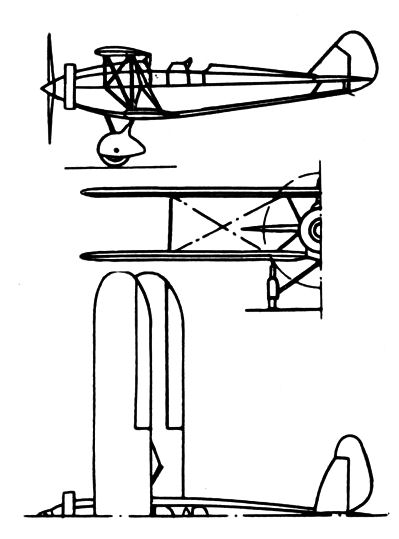
Caproni Ca.113 3-view drawing from L'Aerophile Salon 1932

Data from Jane's All the World's Aircraft 1938

General characteristics

- Crew: two, pilot and instructor
- Length: 7.30 m (23 ft 11 in)
- Wingspan: 10.50 m (34 ft 5 in)
- Height: 2.75 m (9 ft 0 in)
- Wing area: 27.0 m^{2} (291 sq ft)
- Empty weight: 850 kg (1,874 lb)
- Gross weight: 1,100 kg (2,425 lb)
- Powerplant: 1 × Piaggio Stella P.VII C.35 , 280 kW (370 hp)

Performance

- Maximum speed: 250 km/h (160 mph, 130 kn)
- Stall speed: 80 km/h (50 mph, 43 kn)
- Range: 300 km (190 mi, 160 nmi)
- Service ceiling: 7,500 m (24,600 ft)
- Time to altitude: 11 min 15 s to 5,000 m (16,000 ft)

== See also ==
Related lists

- List of Interwar military aircraft

== Bibliography ==
- Andreev, Jordan (March 1999). "Les avions Kaproni-Bulgarski (I)" [The Kaproni-Bulgarski Aircraft]. Avions: Toute l'aéronautique et son histoire (in French) (72): 48–50. ISSN 1243-8650.
- Andreev, Jordan (April 1999). "Les avions Kaproni-Bulgarski (fin)" [Kaproni-Bulgarski Aircraft]. Avions: Toute l'aéronautique et son histoire (in French) (73): 45–52. ISSN 1243-8650.
- Bernád, Dénes (November–December 1996). "Balkan Birds: Thirty-Five Years of Bulgarian Aircraft Production: Part 2". Air Enthusiast. No. 96. pp. 10–17. ISSN 0143-5450.
- Grey, C. G.; Bridgman, Leonard, eds. (1938). Jane's All the World's Aircraft 1938. London: Sampson Low, Marston & Company, Ltd.
- Taylor, Michael J. H. (1989). Jane's Encyclopedia of Aviation. London: Studio Editions. p. 234.
- Thompson, Jonathon P. (1963). Italian Civil and Military Aircraft 1930–1945. Aero Publishers, Inc. ISBN 0-8168-6500-0.
- Tincopa, Amaru; Rivas, Santiago (2016). Axis Aircraft in Latin America. Manchester, UK: Crécy Publishing. ISBN 978-1-90210-949-7.
- World Aircraft Information Files. London: Bright Star Publishing. pp. File 891 Sheet 10.
