= Piaggio Stella P.VII =

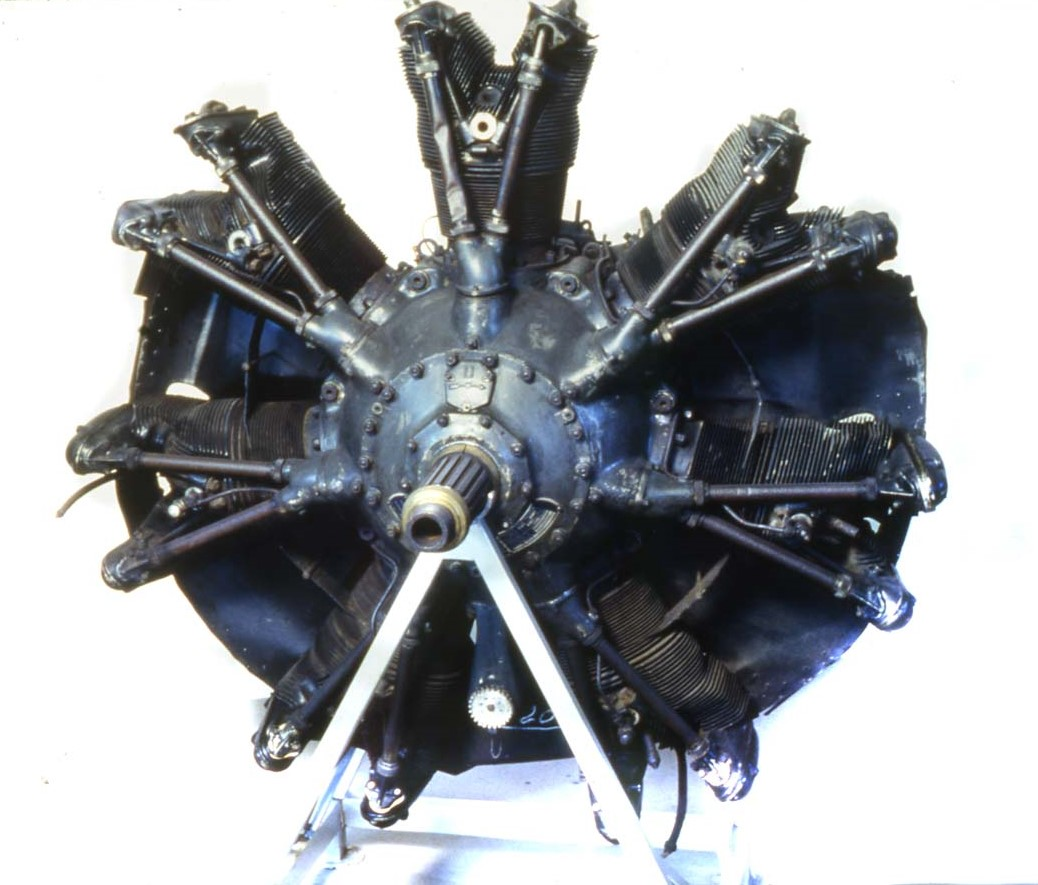
- Type: Air cooled radial
- National origin: Italy
- Manufacturer: Piaggio
- Designer: Renzo Spolti
- First run: 1933
- Major applications: Caproni Ca.113; Caproni Ca.133; Caproni Ca.310

The Piaggio Stella P.VII was the first P series aircraft engine produced by Rinaldo Piaggio S.p.A. Based on its experience license-producing the Gnome-Rhône 7K, Piaggio sold the engine to be used on a wide range of Italian aircraft before and during World War II, including the record-breaking Caproni Ca.133.

== Development ==
Having built engines under licence from Gnome et Rhône, Piaggio designed a seven-cylinder radial using the same principles. The engine, named P.VII for its seven cylinders, was one in a series of radial engines produced by Piaggio initially named Stella, meaning star. The engine was first run in 1933 and was produced in many models. One notable version was the P.VII Z which was fitted with a floatless Piaggio AS80 carburettor for aerobatic flight. It powered the Caproni Ca.133 flown by Renato Donati that, in 1933, broke the record for the longest duration in inverted flight.

== Variants ==
P.VII C.15
Supercharged, rated at 331 kW (444 hp) at 1,500 m (4,900 ft); first flew 1933
P.VII C.16
Supercharged, rated at 338 kW (453 hp) at 1,600 m (5,200 ft); first flew 1934
P.VII C.16/35
P.VII C.35
Supercharged, rated at 338 kW (453 hp) at 3,500 m (11,500 ft); first flew 1935
P.VII C.40
Supercharged, rated at 287 kW (385 hp) at 4,000 m (13,000 ft); first flew 1935
P.VII C.45 / 2v
Two speed supercharged, rated at 287 kW (385 hp) at 4,500 m (14,800 ft); first flew 1935
P.VII R.C.10
Supercharged and geared, rated at 1,000 m (3,300 ft).
P.VII R.C.35
Supercharged and geared, rated at 368 kW (493 hp) at 3,500 m (11,500 ft); first flew 1938
P.VII R.C.45
Supercharged and geared, rated at 287 kW (385 hp) at 4,500 m (14,800 ft) first flew 1935
P.VII Z
Normally aspirated, designed for acrobatic aircraft, rated at 272 kW (365 hp), first flew 1933

== Applications ==
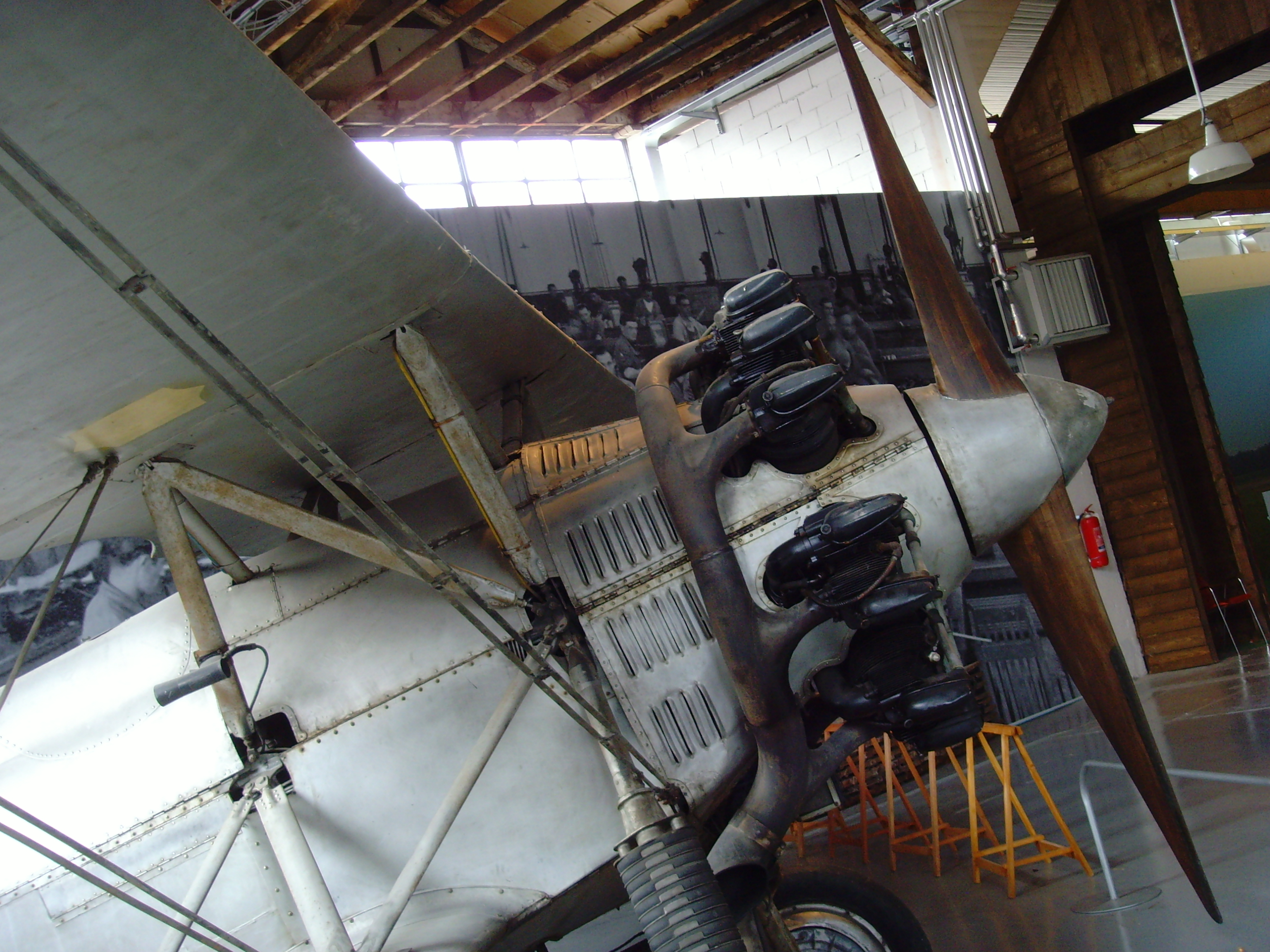
P.VII mounted on the Caproni Ca.113 in Volandia

- Breda Ba.28
- Caproni Ca.101
- Caproni Ca.113
- Caproni Ca.133
- Caproni Ca.148
- Caproni Ca.310
- Caproni Ca.311
- Caproni Ca.316
- Hispano HS-42
- IMAM Ro.41
- North American Sk.14A
- Savoia-Marchetti S.71
- Savoia-Marchetti SM.85

== Specifications (C.35) ==
Data from S.A. Piaggio e.C. (1939). Instruzione per l’uso del motore P VII C 35 – D P VII C 35 – S. Rome: Ministero dell’Aeronautica.

=== General characteristics ===
- Type: 7-cylinder, single row, air cooled radial engine
- Bore: 146 mm (5.7 in)
- Stroke: 165 mm (6.5 in)
- Displacement: 19.337 L (1,180 in^{3})
- Length: 1,050 mm (41 in)
- Diameter: 1,235 mm (48.6 in)
- Dry weight: 295 kg (650 lb)

=== Components ===
- Valvetrain: 2 x overhead valves per cylinder operated by rockers and pushrods
- Supercharger: Centrifugal compressor
- Fuel type: 87 Octane petrol
- Cooling system: Air-cooled

=== Performance ===
- Power output:
  - Take-off: 368 kW (493 hp) at 2100 rpm
  - Cruise: 338 kW (453 hp) at 2100 rpm at 3,500 m (11,483 ft)
- Compression ratio: 5.5:1
- Specific fuel consumption: 292 g/(kW•h) (0.48 lb/(hp•h)) at 1900 rpm
- Oil consumption: 9.5 g/(kW•h) (0.015 lb/(hp•h)) at 1900 rpm

== See also ==
Comparable engines

- Armstrong Siddeley Cheetah
- Avia Rk.17
- Bristol Neptune
- Gnome-Rhône 7K
- Jacobs R-915

Related lists

- List of aircraft engines
