= Caproni Ca.310 =

Italian reconnaissance aircraft used in World War II

Ca.310
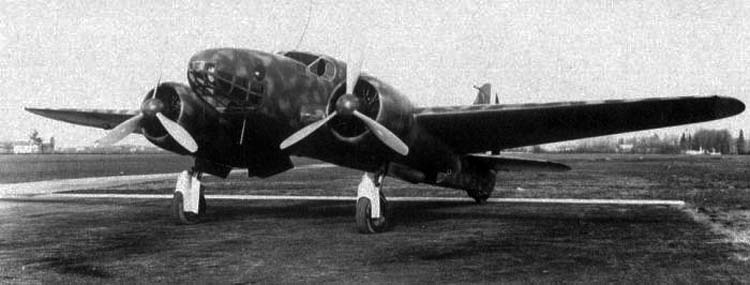
- Caproni-Begamaschi Ca.310

General information
- Type: Reconnaissance
- Manufacturer: Caproni
- Designer: Cesare Pallavicino
- Primary users: Regia Aeronautica Hungarian Air Force; Royal Norwegian Air Force; Air Force of Peru
- Number built: 312

History
- Introduction date: 1938
- First flight: 20 February 1937
- Retired: 1948
- Variants: Caproni Ca.313; Caproni Ca.311

The Caproni Ca.310 Libeccio (Italian: southwest wind) was an Italian monoplane, twin-engine reconnaissance aircraft used in World War II. Derived from the similar Ca.309, it had its combat debut during the Spanish Civil War and took part in the earlier phases of World War II in Libya. Some were used in attack groups as a temporary replacement for the unsatisfactory Breda Ba.65. The last Ca.310 was retired by the Italian Air Force in 1948.

== Design and development ==
The Ca.310 was designed as a low-wing monoplane reconnaissance/bomber, being essentially a version of the semi-military Ca.309 with retractable landing gear and uprated engines. The fuselage was of welded steel tube construction with a covering of light alloy panels and fabric, while the empennage/tail unit was of wooden construction with plywood skin on its fixed portions and fabric covering on control surfaces.

Above the fuselage, mounted in line with the wing trailing edges was a manually operated dorsal turret armed with a single 7.7 mm (0.303 in) Breda-SAFAT machine gun.

== Operational history ==
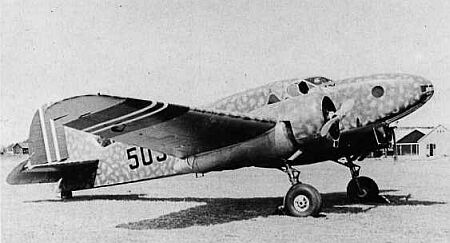
One of the four Norwegian Caproni Ca.310s c. 1939

Caproni pinned great hopes on the Ca. 310's effectiveness as a combat aircraft, only to be dashed when its performance fell short of expectations. This lack of performance resulted in both Norway and Hungary being disappointed with the export models they received in 1938. The Ca.310 had been evaluated by the Regia Aeronautica (Italian Air Force) which ordered a small batch. A unit of 16 aircraft was sent to Spain in July 1938 for operational trials as a reconnaissance/bomber by the Italian expeditionary force operating alongside the Nationalist insurgents in the Spanish Civil War.

The Norwegian aircraft were acquired as part of a dried and salted cod (Klippfisk) barter deal between Norway and Italy. The original order, including options, was for 24 aircraft, but after seeing that the aircraft did not perform well, the Norwegian authorities refused to accept any further Ca.310s. Instead, a delivery of 12 Caproni Ca.312s with upgraded engines and improved performance was substituted, but not delivered before the German invasion of Norway on 9 April 1940. A similar scenario occurred with other export contracts, especially with a hoped-for Royal Air Force order for bomber trainers being curtailed during negotiations with Caproni when Italy entered the war as an Axis power.

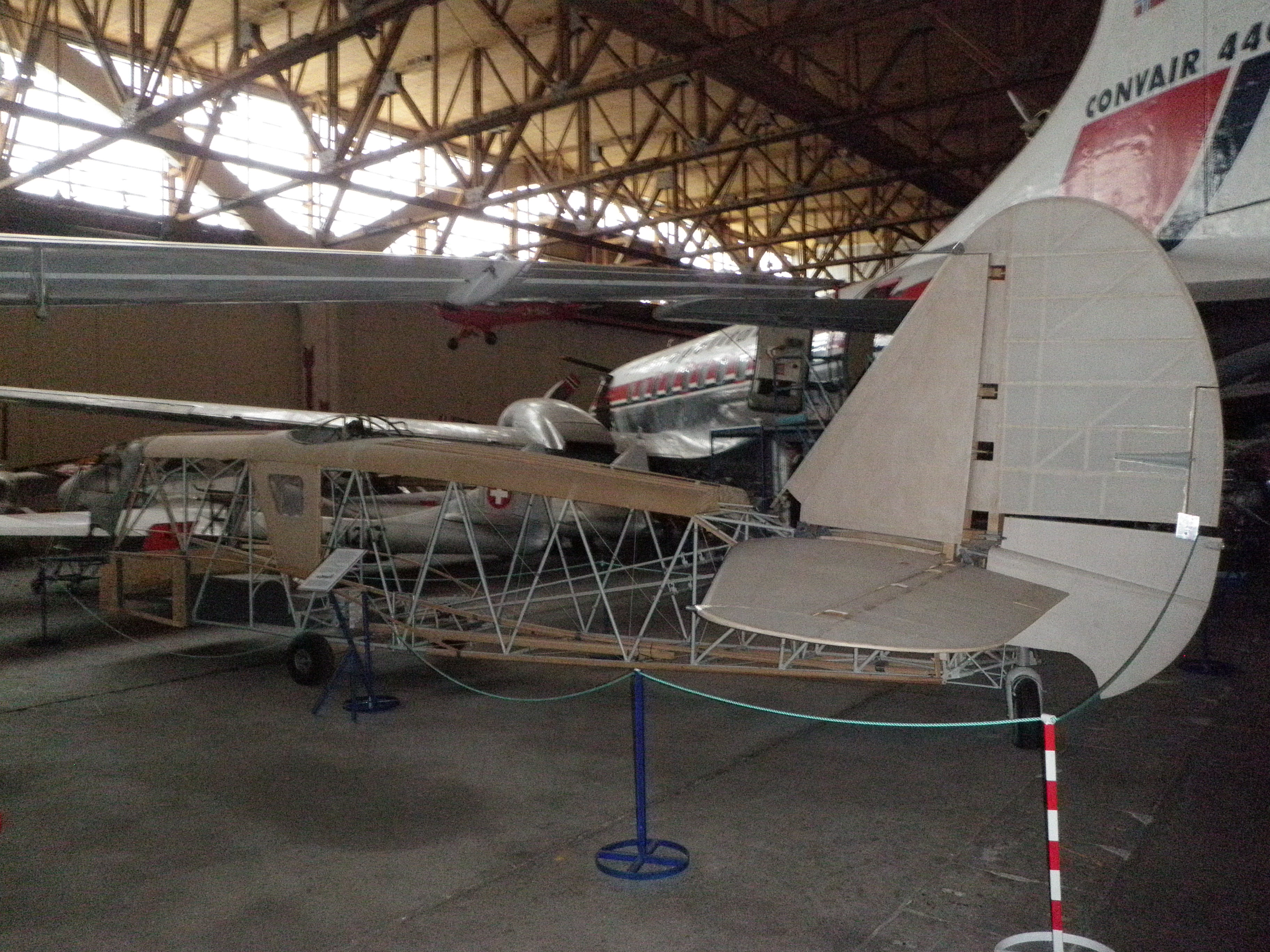
Partially restored Caproni Ca.310 bomber, Sola Aviation Museum

A series of 12 Ca.310bis were produced for Yugoslavia. This variant differed mainly in having an unstepped, glazed nose. The prototype Ca.310bis served as the development for the Caproni Ca.311.

The Hungarian Air Force considered the aircraft a promising idea, but its maneuverability was sluggish even compared to their other bombers, its small bomb load made it unsuitable for independent bombing missions, and its low speed made it unsuitable for reconnaissance. The MKLE therefore wanted to use the 310 as a training aircraft. However, due to the series of accidents and technical defects, a committee was convened to thoroughly inspect each aircraft individually.

According to the committee, the aircraft was only capable of a speed of 286 km/h in practice, the manufacturer's claims about max. speed were completely false. Its maneuverability was poor, and it was a very unreliable construction from a technical point of view. Not only were the engines of poor quality, but the propellers, the steering gears, the tail wheel assembly and the airframe itself were also manufactured so inaccurately that it made operation dangerous. The engines were very difficult to coordinate due to the string regulator system, so the machine often made even 80° turns due to changing torques, which caused several accidents. Thus, the aircraft was completely unsuitable for training purposes and the stock was returned to the Caproni company, which, acknowledging the defective production, refunded the costs.

The 33 Hungarian Ca.310s returned to Italy were refurbished by Caproni and reissued to the 50˚ Stormo d’Assalto. The Ca.310 was not considered an effective combat aircraft and when it saw service during World War II, it was as a reconnaissance aircraft and as a light bomber in areas where no serious opposition was expected.

Peruvian Aeronautical Corps Ca.310s took part in the July 1941 Ecuadorian–Peruvian War. Together with North American NA.50s, the Peruvian Ca.310s flew bombing missions against Ecuadorian cities and supported Army of Peru ground forces.

== Variants ==
Ca.310
Twin-engined reconnaissance aircraft, powered by two Piaggio Stella P.VII C.16/35 seven-cylinder radial piston engines.
Ca.310 Idro
Twin-float seaplane version.
Ca.310bis
Effectively the prototype of the Caproni Ca.311 with the unstepped all-glazed nose and two Piaggio Stella P.VII C.35 engines
Ca.318
Proposed derivative powered by two Gnome-Rhône 14K engines
A.3
Spanish Air Force designation for the Ca.310.

== Operators ==
Independent State of Croatia

- Zrakoplovstvo Nezavisne Države Hrvatske operated seven captured ex-Yugoslav aircraft.

Hungary

- Royal Hungarian Air Force ordered 36 examples in 1938, but returned the surviving 33 in 1940 after being unhappy with type's performance.

Kingdom of Italy

- Regia Aeronautica 193 aircraft
- Aviazione Legionaria 16 aircraft
- Italian Co-Belligerent Air Force

Italy Postwar

- Aeronautica Militare Italiana

Norway

- Norwegian Army Air Service operated four Ca.310s. Serial: 501, 503, 505 and 507

Peru

- Cuerpo de Aviación del Perú purchased 16 aircraft in 1938. 15 of them were delivered by ship in May 1938, and the last one was lost during the ferry flight from Italy to Peru on August 2, 1939, killing Capt. Pedro Canga Rodríguez and one of his crew members - their deaths being immortalized in the song "Alas Peruanas" by Los Morochucos.

Spanish State

- Aviación Nacional -16 aircraft

Yugoslavia

- Royal Yugoslav Air Force purchased 12 aircraft in 1938.

Yugoslavia

- SFR Yugoslav Air Force - Postwar.

== Surviving aircraft ==
One Norwegian example is being restored and is displayed at Sola Aviation Museum.

== Specifications (Ca.310) ==

Data from Caproni Ca.310 Overview and Specifications

General characteristics

- Crew: 3
- Length: 12.2 m (40 ft 0 in)
- Wingspan: 16.2 m (53 ft 2 in)
- Height: 3.52 m (11 ft 7 in)
- Wing area: 38.7 m^{2} (417 sq ft)
- Empty weight: 3,040 kg (6,702 lb)
- Max takeoff weight: 4,650 kg (10,251 lb)
- Powerplant: 2 × Piaggio Stella P.VII C.16/35 7-cylinder air-cooled radial piston engine, 350 kW (470 hp) each
- Propellers: 3-bladed variable-pitch ptropellers

Performance

- Maximum speed: 365 km/h (227 mph, 197 kn) Based on Hungarian tests, only 286 km/h was possible with a fully equipped plane.
- Cruise speed: 285–312 km/h (177–194 mph, 154–168 kn)
- Range: 1,690 km (1,050 mi, 910 nmi)
- Service ceiling: 7,000 m (23,000 ft)

Armament

- Guns:

- 3 × 7.7 mm (0.303 in) Breda-SAFAT machine guns (2 fixed forward firing mounted in the wing roots; 1 in a dorsal turret)

- Bombs: up to 450 kg (992 lb)

== See also ==
Related lists

- List of Interwar military aircraft
- List of Regia Aeronautica aircraft used in World War II

== Bibliography ==
- Lucchini, Carlo (April 1999). "Le meeting saharien de 1938" [The 1938 Sahara Air Meeting]. Avions: Toute l'aéronautique et son histoire (in French) (73): 53–57. ISSN 1243-8650.
