= Caproni Ca.311 =

1939 reconnaissance aircraft model

Ca.311
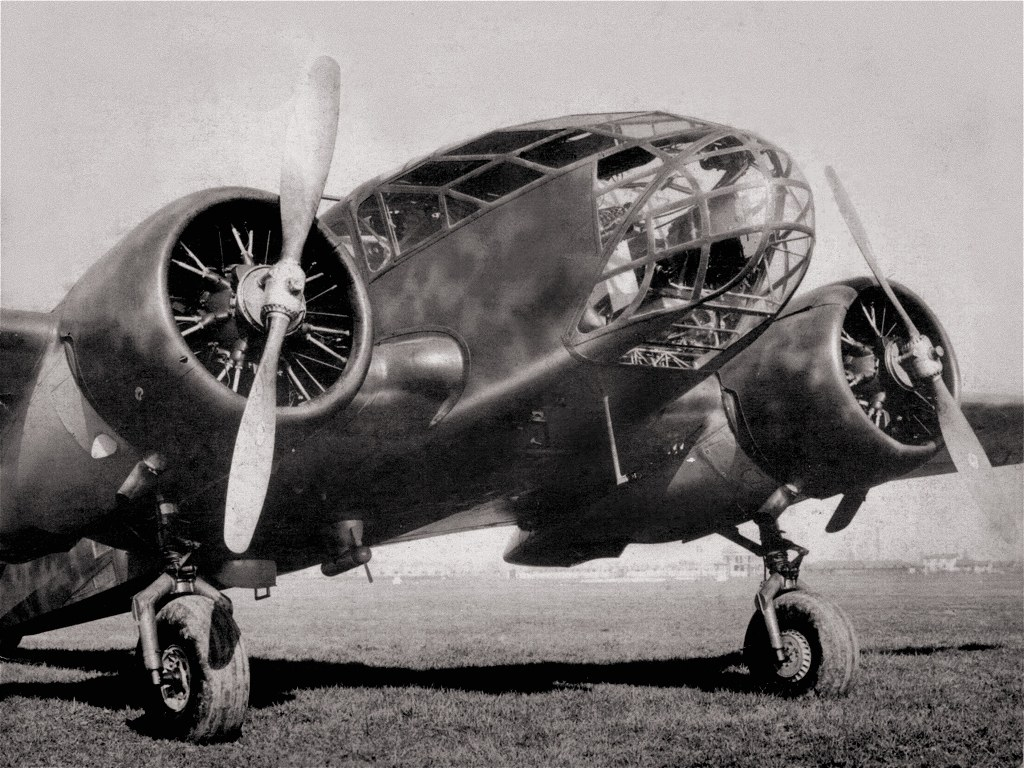

General information
- Type: Reconnaissance bomber
- Manufacturer: Caproni
- Primary user: Regia Aeronautica
- Number built: 335

History
- First flight: 1 April 1939

The Caproni Ca.311 was a light bomber-reconnaissance aircraft produced in Italy prior to and during World War II.

== Design ==
The Ca.311 was a member of the large family of Caproni designs derived from the Ca.306 airliner prototype of 1935, and more directly a modification of the Ca.310 bomber. As with other related types, it was a low-wing cantilever monoplane of conventional design. This particular design incorporated the Ca.310's retractable main undercarriage, as well as the heavily glazed nose that had been tested on the Ca.310bis prototype. New features included a relocation of the dorsal turret to a position immediately aft of the cockpit, and additional glazing throughout the fuselage.

From 1940, this aircraft began to replace the IMAM Ro.37 in service, completing this process the following year.

== Variants ==
- Ca.311 – twin-engined reconnaissance bomber aircraft.
- Ca.311M (Modificato – "Modified") – version with less glazing

== Operators ==
Independent State of Croatia

- Zrakoplovstvo Nezavisne Države Hrvatske

Kingdom of Italy

- Regia Aeronautica - 284 aircraft

Kingdom of Yugoslavia

- Yugoslav Royal Air Force

Yugoslavia

- SFR Yugoslav Air Force – postwar

== Specifications (Ca.311) ==
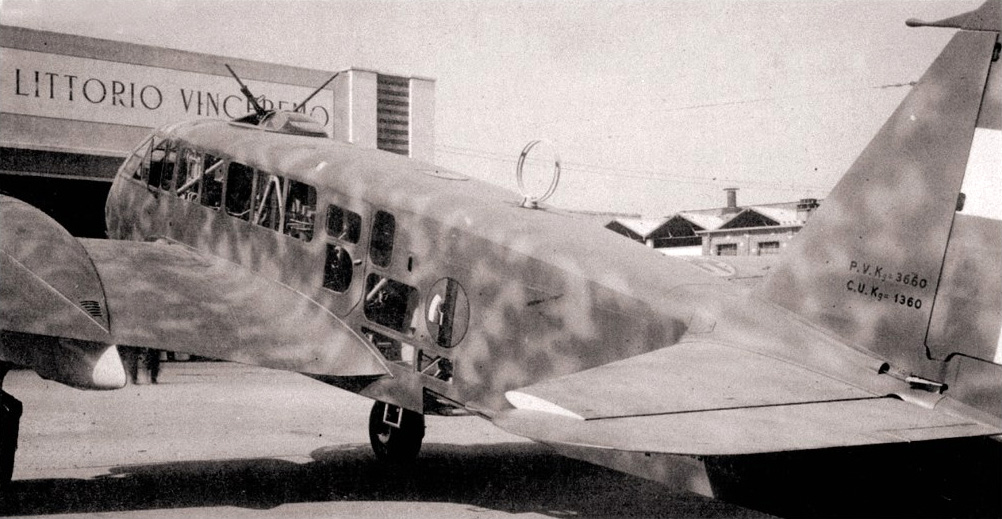
Aft view

General characteristics

- Crew: 3
- Length: 11.74 m (38 ft 6 in)
- Wingspan: 16.20 m (53 ft 2 in)
- Height: 3.69 m (12 ft 1 in)
- Wing area: 38.4 m^{2} (413 sq ft)
- Empty weight: 3,460 kg (7,630 lb)
- Gross weight: 4,822 kg (10,630 lb)
- Powerplant: 2 × Piaggio Stella P.VII C.35 7 cylinder radial engines , 350 kW (470 hp) each

Performance

- Maximum speed: 307 km/h (191 mph, 166 kn)
- Range: 1,600 km (1,000 mi, 870 nmi)
- Service ceiling: 7,400 m (24,300 ft)

Armament

- 1 × fixed, forward-firing 7.7 mm (.303 in) Breda-SAFAT machine gun in port wing
- 1 × 7.7 mm (.303 in) Breda-SAFAT machine gun in dorsal turret
- 1 × flexible, rearward-firing 7.7 mm (.303 in) Breda-SAFAT machine gun in ventral hatch
- 400 kg (880 lb) of bombs

== Sources ==
- Domange, Yves (March 1999). "Quand les démocraties occidentales achetaient des avions dans l'Italie fasciste... (2^{ème} partie: la Belgique et l'Angleterre)" [When Western Democracies Bought Their Aircraft from Fascist Italy... (Part 2: Belgium and England)]. Avions: Toute l'aéronautique et son histoire (in French) (72): 40–47. ISSN 1243-8650.
- Taylor, Michael J. H. (1989). Jane's Encyclopedia of Aviation. London: Studio Editions. p. 237.
- World Aircraft Information Files. London: Bright Star Publishing. pp. File 891 Sheet 11.
- Уголок неба
