= Gianni Caproni Museum of Aeronautics =

- Museo dell'Aeronautica Gianni Caproni
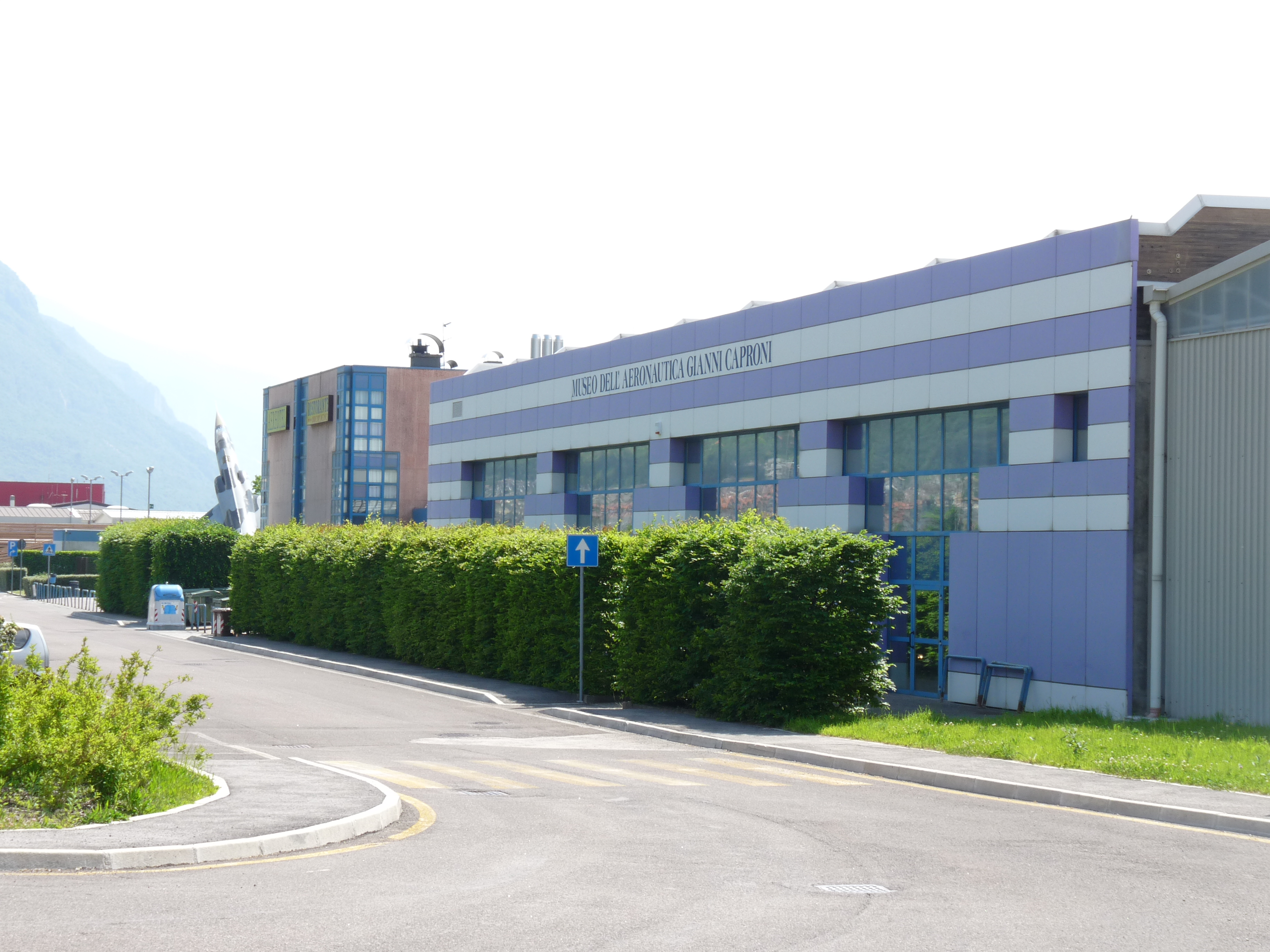

- Location within Italy
- Established: 1927
- Location: Via Lidorno, 3; 38100 Trento; Italy
- Coordinates: 46.020474°N 11.12683°E
- Type: Aviation museum
- Collection size: 26 aircraft on display several hundred historically significant artifacts
- Curator: Michele Lanzinger
- Parking: On site (no charge)
- Website: www.museocaproni.it
- Area: 1,400 m^{2} (15,000 sq ft) (main hangar only)

The Gianni Caproni Museum of Aeronautics (Italian: Museo dell'Aeronautica Gianni Caproni) is Italy's oldest aviation museum, as well as the country's oldest corporate museum. It was established in 1927 as the Caproni Museum (Museo Caproni) by Italian aviation pioneer and aeronautical engineer, Giovanni Battista "Gianni" Caproni and his wife, Timina Guasti Caproni.

The museum was originally located in Taliedo, in the suburbs of Milan. The aircraft in the collection were moved to Venegono Superiore during World War II, and the exhibition was reopened in Vizzola Ticino (in the province of Varese) in the 1960s. At the end of the 1980s, the museum moved to its present location. The current museum building, 5 kilometres (3.1 mi) south of Trento and adjacent to the Trento Airport (itself dedicated to the memory of Gianni Caproni), was opened on 3 October 1992.

== History ==
=== Origins ===
Giovanni Battista Caproni, better known as Gianni Caproni was a civil and electrical engineer from Trentino, a region of northern Italy, who was renowned for his designing and flying several pioneering aircraft between 1910 and 1913. Small, single-engine aircraft, like the Caproni Ca.1, Ca.6 and Ca.12 were important milestones in the early development of Italian aviation. During World War I, Caproni became one of the most important Allied aircraft manufacturers, responsible for the design and manufacture of large, multi-engine long-range bombers like the three-engined Caproni Ca.32, Ca.33, Ca.36 and Ca.40. These bombers were some of the most significant examples of the time, in the field of heavy aircraft. During the interwar period, with the strategic bombing theories of Giulio Douhet being debated, the operational use of Caproni bombers was seen as an important landmark in the history of aviation.

Gianni Caproni (left) in the early 20th century.

By the end of the war the Caproni company was well established, but the decrease in military orders that followed the end of the conflict compelled the firm to start producing civil aircraft to keep its business running. Some of the wartime bombers were converted to the airliner or cargo role. New models were developed as well, being specifically designed as airliners – among them the Caproni Ca.48, Ca.59 and the Ca. 60 Transaereo (the latter being tested unsuccessfully).

Besides his talent for engineering, Gianni Caproni was convinced of the importance of preserving and honouring the historical heritage related to the birth and early development of Italian aviation in general, and to the Caproni firm in particular. He began to gather an expansive collection not only of aircraft and aviation-related technologies, but also collecting related documents and memorabilia. From an early period, Caproni also collaborated and supported artists, as well as assembling a collection of paintings and other pieces of art. His wife, Timina Guasti Caproni, was of like mind and both had a strong artistic sensibility. Their collections reflected not only a love for aviation history but also art history. In the second half of the 1920s, the Capronis decided to open a museum meant to house a display of all the material they had collected. Recounting the origins of the institution, Michele Lanzinger, the director of the Tridentine Museum of Natural Sciences (Museo Tridentino di Scienze Naturali), to whose network of scientific museums the Gianni Caproni Museum of Aeronautics has belonged since 1999, said:

While the aircraft designer and manufacturer collected the most notable flying machines he had created, among whom we today count several unique specimens – that were thereby saved from assured destruction – his wife gathered documents, relics and, most importantly, artwork related to flight.

In 1927, the Caproni Museum was established in Taliedo, not far from Milan, by provisions of the joint will of Gianni and Timina Guasti Caproni. It was Italy's first museum to be entirely dedicated to the topic of aviation, as well as the nation's first corporate museum. The museum's original goal was to preserve the items of historical interest about the development of the Caproni aircraft manufacturing company, but its scope soon came to include every aspect of the history of human flight as well as those facets of art and other disciplines that had an aviation connection.

Between June and October 1934, the Italian Aeronautics Exhibition (Esposizione dell'Aeronautica Italiana) was held in Milan. It was organized by a committee (Direttorio ordinatore) with whom Gianni Caproni collaborated by sending four aircraft, displayed at the exhibition's pavilion at the Art Palace (Palazzo dell'Arte); they were the experimental biplanes: Caproni Ca.1 (the first aircraft flown by Caproni) and Ca.6 (exhibited without the fabric covering of its unusual double-cambered wing), the monoplane, Ca.18 military reconnaissance aircraft and the three-engine biplane Ca.36M bomber.

The exposition, also featuring an innovative and eye-catching exhibition design, devised by some of the most prominent Italian artists of the time, (among them, the architect Giuseppe Pagano) was a great success. At its closing, Benito Mussolini ordered that the official Regia Aeronautica museum (Museo storico dell'Accademia Aeronautica), which at the time was located in the Palace of Caserta in southern Italy, was to be moved to Milan and merge with the Caproni Museum, becoming the National Aeronautical Museum (Museo Nazionale Aeronautico).

The prospect of a unified Italian aviation museum was farsighted, however, it did not materialize. Since the Caproni Museum retained its status as the most important institution of its kind in Italy, it started to evolve towards becoming a general aviation museum in which all types of materials of general aeronautical interest (Note: The museum collection features both civil and military artifacts representing any historical period or location.) were to be collected. The museum also undertook the responsibility to preserve and properly display such materials. Additionally, the Caproni Museum started its publishing activity in this period; among the volumes published in the 1930s were: Gli aeroplani Caproni, Studi, progetti, realizzazioni 1908–1935 (Caproni aircraft, projects, studies and achievements 1908–1935), Francesco Zambeccari aeronauta (Francesco Zambeccari, aeronaut) and L'aeronautica italiana nell'immagine 1487–1875 (Italian aeronautics in pictures 1487–1875).

The Caproni Museum retained its original location just outside Milan, near the company's plants in Taliedo, until after the outbreak of World War II. However, during the first half of the 1930s, the collection had been kept stored in the plants themselves, in locations not environmentally suitable for their preservation and display of the artifacts. After 1935, the necessity of building a permanent, purpose-made exhibition hall became evident; subsequently, one of the large hangars of the Taliedo Airport, close to the factory, was converted to this purpose so that the now rich and important collection of the Caproni Museum could be properly housed. When this new exhibition hall was opened in 1940, the following aircraft were on display:

- An Ansaldo S.V.A. 5
- A Caproni Bristol
- The Caproni Ca.1
- The Caproni Ca.6
- A Caproni Ca.18
- The Caproni Ca.20
- The Caproni Ca.22
- A Caproni Ca.36M
- A Caproni Ca.42
- The Caproni Ca.53
- Some parts of the Caproni Ca.60 Transaereo
- The C.N.A. Eta
- The fuselage of a Fokker D.VIII
- A Gabardini land monoplane
- A Gabardini monoplane seaplane
- A Gabardini G.51bis biplane
- The fuselage of a Macchi-Nieuport 29
- The fuselage of a Roland VIb
- A part of a Siemens-Schuckert D.IV
- Three airship gondolas
- A Leonardo da Vinci glider replica

In addition to the cited aircraft, a massive, but unquantifiable number of model aircraft, aircraft engines, propellers, aviation-related artwork and other items was also part of the collection.

=== From World War II to the 1980s ===
Starting from 1942, it became necessary to move some of the Caproni Museum's aircraft away from Milan to prevent them from being damaged or destroyed by Allied bombing. In spite of the precautions that were taken, however, some aircraft were destroyed (this was the case with the only existing Ca.42, which was destroyed in a fire) or lost (as it happened to the C.N.A. Eta and to the parts of the Macchi-Nieuport 29 and Roland VIb). Nonetheless, most of the museum's holdings, including not only the aircraft but also the library and the archives, survived the war.

At the end of the war, the Caproni Museum's aircraft were gathered in Venegono Superiore, a little town in the province of Varese; the institution's documentary collection, instead, was kept in Rome. Even though lacking a museum building suitable for housing the exhibition and allowing to keep the collection visible to the public, the Caproni Museum remained an important institution in the field of preserving aviation-related historical heritage. The museum continued to participate in aviation events and in acquiring or being gifted new items for the collection. Between the 1940s and the 1950s, the museum's operations were furthered due to the work of the co-founder, Timina Caproni.

In the 1960s, finally, a new exhibition pavilion was opened in the old Caproni factory in Vizzola Ticino, still in the province of Varese and close to the location in which the Malpensa Airport would later be built. The Caproni Museum was once again open to the public and kept on increasing its collection. The presence of a 600 metres (1,969 ft) grass runway, very close to the museum's buildings, allowed some of the new acquisitions to get to the museum by air, thus ideally ending their operational career and also guaranteeing the best possible state of conservation at the time of their accession. This was the case with the Avia FL.3 and the Macchi MB.308 aircraft that flew to the museum, and are still on display at the museum in Trento.

Some of the aircraft in the Caproni Museum underwent important restoration and conservation at this time. Those aircraft that were in good condition were on display in the representative hangars, dating from World War I. The others were stored in the Caproni family villa at Venegono Superiore. When the founders died, (Note: Gianni Caproni died in 1957, Timina Guasti in 1991.) their children, Giovanni and Contessa Maria Fede Caproni, took their place in managing the institution. The work of the founders' offspring allowed the museum to maintain its level of importance on a national and international scale, with the collection being constantly enriched by new acquisitions.

In the 1980s, the financial decline of the aeronautical works company which Gianni Caproni had started long before, forced the museum in Vizzola Ticino to close. However, due to the generous intervention of Martino Aichner, (Note: Italian pilot Martino Aichner was the recipient of a Medaglia d'oro al Valor Militare during World War II.) an agreement was signed in August 1988 between the Caproni family and the Trentino; in such agreement, the latter, the autonomous province of Trento, agreed to restore the collection and to provide an exhibition building to be constructed in a location close to the Trento Airport; the museum was to be named Gianni Caproni Museum of Aeronautics (in Italian, Museo dell'Aeronautica Gianni Caproni).

=== From the 1990s on ===
In April 1989, aircraft restoration began under the supervision of the Masterfly company of Rovereto. On 2 December of the same year, the construction of the museum's central exhibition building was started. The new exhibition pavilion featured a 1,400-square-metre (15,069 sq ft) hall that initially housed 17 aircraft in controlled environmental humidity and temperature conditions. The main building of the new facility was opened on 3 October 1992.

In spring 1999, the Gianni Caproni Museum of Aeronautics became a territorial section (sezione territoriale) (Note: A sezione territoriale is a section of a public institution which is detached from the institution's headquarters but is still overseen by the same local government arm; in the case of the Gianni Caproni Museum of Aeronautics, the autonomous province of Trento.) of the Tridentine Museum of Natural Sciences (Museo Tridentino di Scienze Naturali), thereby becoming a part of a network of 18 scientific and historical museums which are ultimately overseen by the province of Trento. Among others, the museums in the Tridentine Museum of Natural Sciences group include the Alpine Botanical Garden at Viote on Mount Bondone, Lake Dwelling Museum at Molina di Ledro, Arboretum of Arco Climatology Observatory at Roncafort and "Julius Payer" Glaciology Centre at Mandron (Adamello).

In April 2011, a new hangar, adjacent to the northern wall of the main exhibition hall, was opened. The display of the aircraft that were already housed in the museum was reorganized and some additional aircraft, previously stored in the museum's warehouse, could be put on display.

The opening of the new northern hangar occurred during an event called "The Challenge of Flight" (La sfida del volo). An Ansaldo A.1 Balilla, the Caproni Ca.53 and the surviving components of the Caproni Ca.60 were moved from the warehouse north of Trento to the main hall of the museum, thus becoming a part of the permanent exhibition. An Agusta Bell AB 47G, Minzolini Libellula II and North American T-6 Texan were added to the collection and located in the new hangar, along with a Bücker Bü 131, Caproni Ca.193, Macchi MB.308 and Saiman 202M that had previously been on display in the museum's main hangar. The new hangar, the opening of which was the first expansion of the museum since 1992, was a temporary solution – as a sort of preview of a further, permanent and more consistent enlarging of the exhibits, due to the construction of a larger hangar with more suitable accommodation for the preservation of aircraft. In autumn 2011, the northern hangar was closed to allow the start of the new revitalization project.

In summer 2011, the following aircraft were on display in the museum's main hall and secondary hangar:

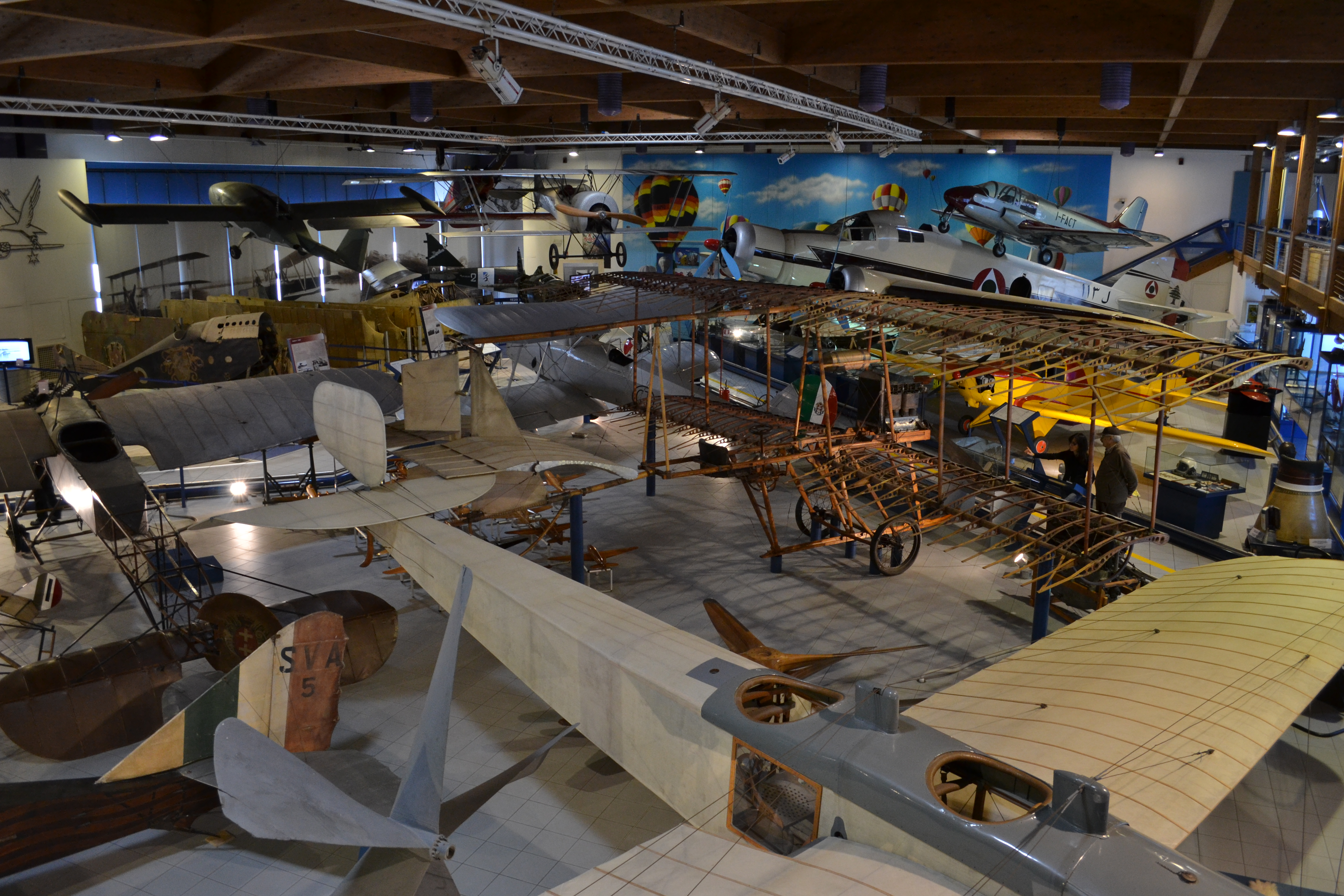
A panoramic view of the main exhibition hall of the museum.

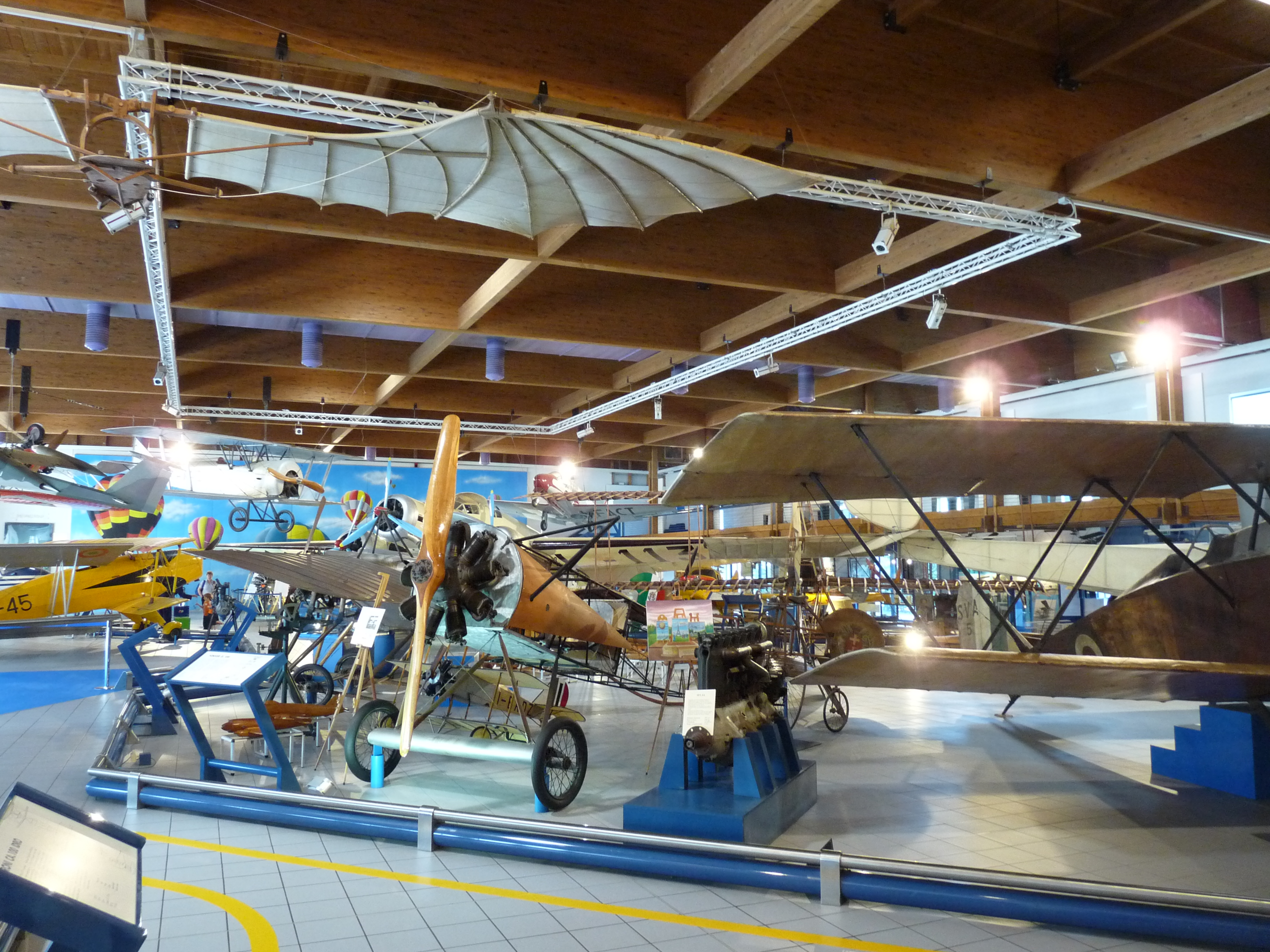
Another view of the main hangar: on the left foreground, the only surviving fuselage of a Fokker D.VIII.

- An Agusta Bell AB 47G
- The unassembled fuselage and wings of an Ansaldo A.1
- An Ansaldo S.V.A. 5
- An Avia FL.3
- A Breda Ba.19
- A Bücker Bü 131
- A Caproni Bristol
- The Caproni Ca.6
- A Caproni Ca.9
- A Caproni Ca.100 floatplane
- The Caproni Ca.163
- The Caproni Ca.193
- The Caproni Trento F.5
- A Caproni Vizzola C-22J
- The unassembled fuselage and wings of the Caproni Ca.53
- Some parts of the Caproni Ca.60 Transaereo
- The fuselage of the Fokker D.VIII
- A Gabardini G.51bis
- A Macchi M.20
- A Macchi MB.308
- Some parts of a Macchi M.C.200
- A Manzolini Libellula II
- A North American T-6 Texan
- Some parts of a Reggiane Re.2005
- A Saiman 202M
- A Savoia-Marchetti S.79

Just outside the museum and airport, a Lockheed F-104G Starfighter is pointed to the sky, and stands as a gate guardian. Its presence is dedicated to the memory of Aeronautica Militare (Italian Air Force) general Licio Giorgieri.

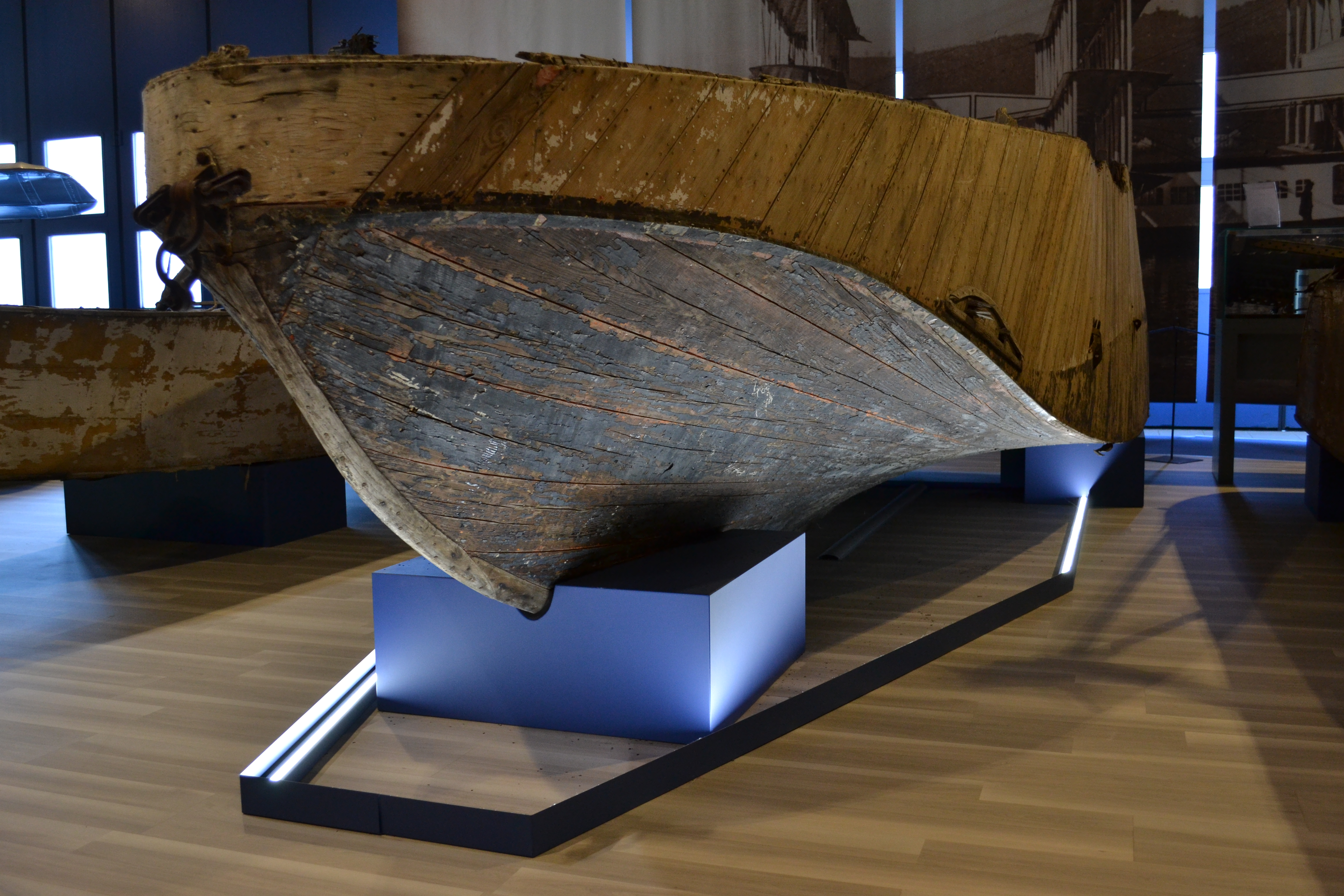
The front section of the main hull of the Caproni Ca.60 Transaereo, tested in 1921, is on display at the Gianni Caproni Museum of Aeronautics along with the other few surviving parts of this remarkable aircraft.

Since the beginning of the 1990s, when the museum moved to its ultimate location, more attention has been placed at identifying the cultural heritage and importance of artifacts on display. The most recent phases of the restoration programme and the enrichment of the exhibition by means of recovering some aircraft from the warehouse and moving them to the new hangar, involved the collaboration and supervision by several cultural institutions of the province of Trento, including the Assessorato alla cultura, the Soprintendenza per i beni storico-artistici and the Soprintendenza per i beni librari, archivistici ed archeologici. Great importance was given to the philologic and authentic restoration of the aircraft's original appearance and internal mechanical structure, to the reconstruction of their history and to their conservation, according to the most advanced theories of cultural heritage preservation and management.

== Collection ==
=== Aircraft ===
Agusta Bell AB 47G
The Agusta Bell AB 47G on display at the Gianni Caproni Museum of Aeronautics is one of the 1,000 built by Italian company Agusta. In 1946, the Bell 47 became the first helicopter to be certified for civilian use; it was then produced in great numbers and was operated worldwide as a multirole helicopter, besides being built under licence in several countries. The helicopter was donated to the museum in 1988.

Ansaldo A.1
The Ansaldo A.1 Balilla was an Italian fighter biplane which was introduced in the final weeks of World War I. The aircraft on display at the museum belonged to Captain Natale Palli, the pilot who had previously flown Gabriele d'Annunzio over Vienna in a two-seater S.V.A. during the famous propaganda raid. It is one of the two surviving Ansaldo A.1s, and the only one whose original silk fabric was preserved undamaged; notably, the image of Saint George killing the Dragon is painted on the right side of the fuselage.

Ansaldo S.V.A. 5
Ansaldo S.V.A. is the name of a family of Italian fighter and reconnaissance biplanes developed in 1916–1917 and best known for d'Annunzio's flight over Vienna on 9 August 1918. The S.V.A. 5 on display at the Gianni Caproni Museum of Aeronautics took part in this raid, piloted by Gino Allegri.

Avia FL.3
The Avia FL.3, designed in Italy in the late 1930s, is a single-engine monoplane training aircraft. It featured a very simple design that afforded great ease of maintenance and was easy to fly. A great number of flying schools before, during and after World War II, operated examples. The exhibited aircraft was built in 1947 and belonged to several owners before coming to the Caproni Museum at the time when the institution was based in Vizzola Ticino. It was restored in 1989 and still features the original engine.

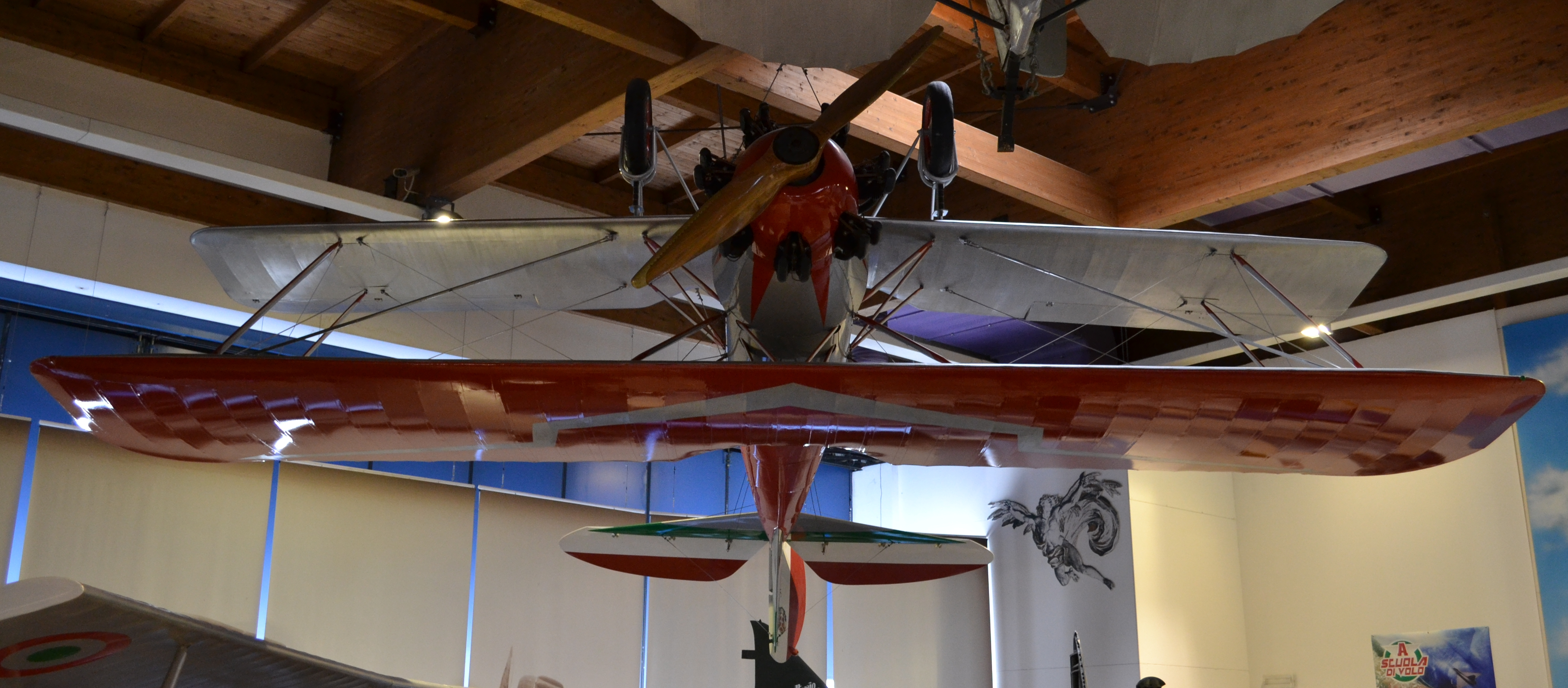
The Breda Ba.19, suspended upside down in honour of its world record.

Breda Ba.19
The Breda Ba.19 was one of the most famous aerobatic aircraft of the 1930s; it is best known for breaking the inverted flight duration world record in 1933. The Ba.19 on display at the museum is the only surviving aircraft of its type; it went through a particularly difficult and radical restoration process, in which many of the parts had to be completely rebuilt – even though most of the components are the original ones.

Bücker Bü 131
The Bücker Bü 131 was a german aerobatic biplane which was built in great numbers during the 1930s, and was widely used in Germany and Switzerland. The aircraft on display was built in 1939 and was operated by the Swiss Air Force for a long period before being moved to an Italian flying school in 1963. It was donated to the Caproni Museum by a private owner in 1976 and was restored in 1989.

Caproni Bristol
The aircraft called Caproni Bristol is actually a Bristol-Coandă monoplane, an aircraft type that was designed by Romanian aeronautical engineer and aviation pioneer Henri Coandă for the British and Colonial Aeroplane Company, Ltd. First flown in 1912, the aircraft currently on display at the Gianni Caproni Museum of Aeronautics was built by Bristol in the United Kingdom, and sent to Italy together with technical drawings so that Caproni could manufacture the type under licence. Two Caproni-built Coandă monoplanes underwent tests for evaluation, among other participants, by the Italian Ministry of War in 1913, but were not selected for production. However, Caproni later sold several aircraft of this type to the Italian Army. The Bristol-Coandă monoplane in the Gianni Caproni Museum of Aeronautics is the oldest surviving Bristol aircraft.

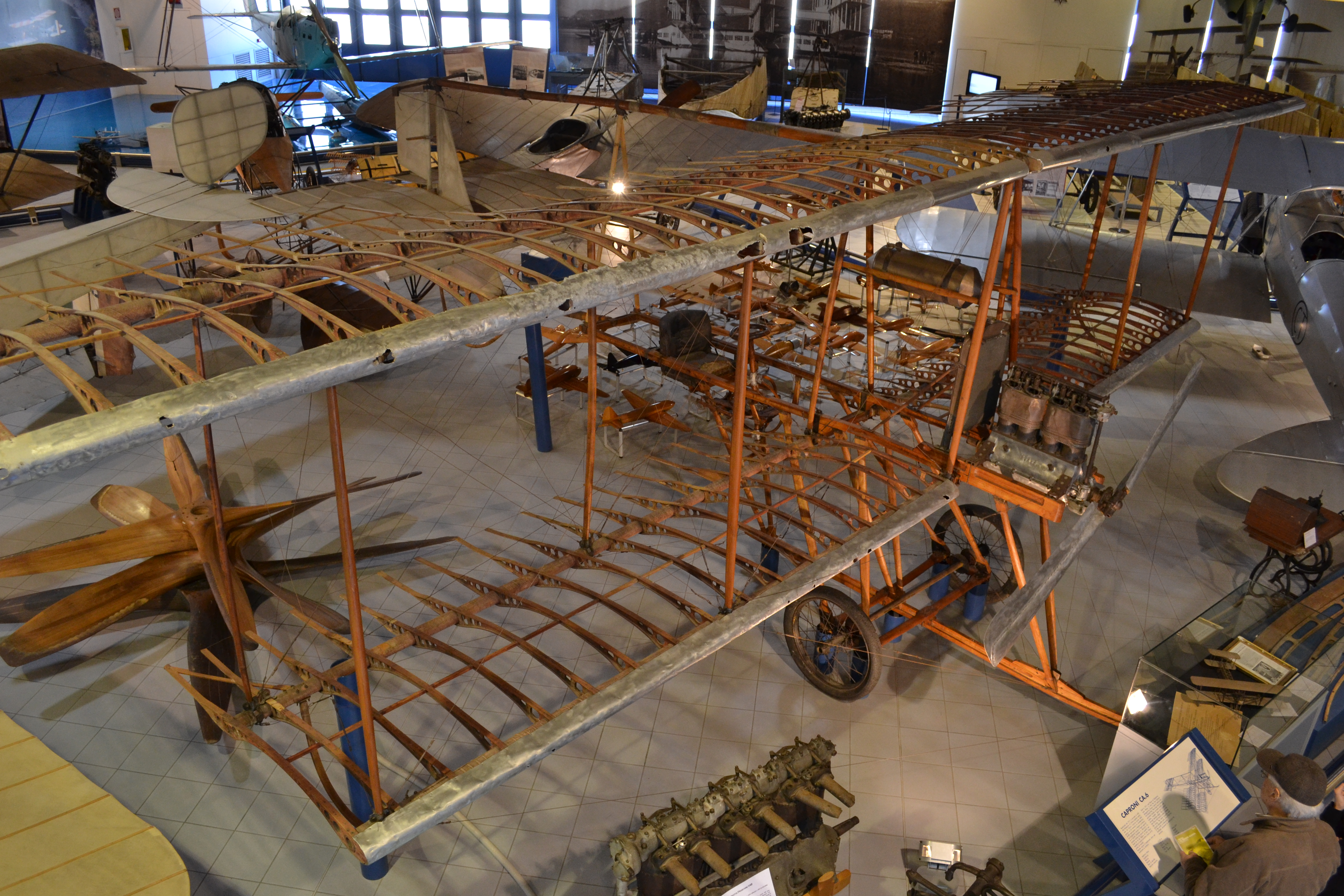
The Caproni Ca.6 on display in Trento.

Caproni Ca.6
The Caproni Ca.6, the sixth airplane built by Gianni Caproni, was a pioneering biplane that featured an innovative variable-pitch propeller (the pitch of whose blades, however, could be adjusted only on the ground) and an unusual double-cambered airfoil. The latter was suggested to Caproni by his friend and colleague, Henri Coandă, but proved unsuccessful. The Caproni Ca.6 on display at the museum is the only aircraft of its type to have been produced, and it is also the oldest aircraft in the collection, dating back to 1911. Because of its structural fragility and lack of information, such as plans or drawings about the details of the aircraft's original construction, it did not undergo restoration. The Caproni Ca.6 did, however, go through a conservation treatment.

Caproni Ca.9
The Caproni Ca.9, whose design was strongly influenced by the success of the Blériot XI (the aircraft with which Louis Blériot had completed the first crossing of the English Channel in 1909) belonged to a series of monoplanes which Caproni built between 1911 and the outbreak of World War I. The Ca.9, of which only one prototype was built, is the only surviving aircraft of this series. In 1986, in the centennial of Gianni Caproni's birth, the Caproni Ca.9 was lent for display to the National Air and Space Museum, Washington, D.C. It underwent several conservation and restoration treatments both in Italy and in the United States.

Caproni Ca.53
The Caproni Ca.53, a large, single-engine triplane aircraft, designed towards the end of World War I, for the light bomber role. Because of technical issues related to its engine, the Ca.53 did not go beyond the prototype stage. As of 2012, the only one to have been built is on display at the Gianni Caproni Museum of Aeronautics; currently, the fuselage and wings are disassembled.

Caproni Ca.60 Transaereo
The Caproni Ca.60 Transaereo, a huge, nine-winged, eight-engine flying boat, conceived as a 100-passenger transatlantic airliner, was tested without success in 1921. It flew twice, crashing at the end of the second flight, resulting in serious damage. No further tests were carried out, and most of the aircraft's airframe structure was lost. The only surviving parts (the two side floats, the front section of the main, central hull, one of the Liberty L-12 engines and the control panel) are on display at the Gianni Caproni Museum of Aeronautics, where they have been moved in 2011.

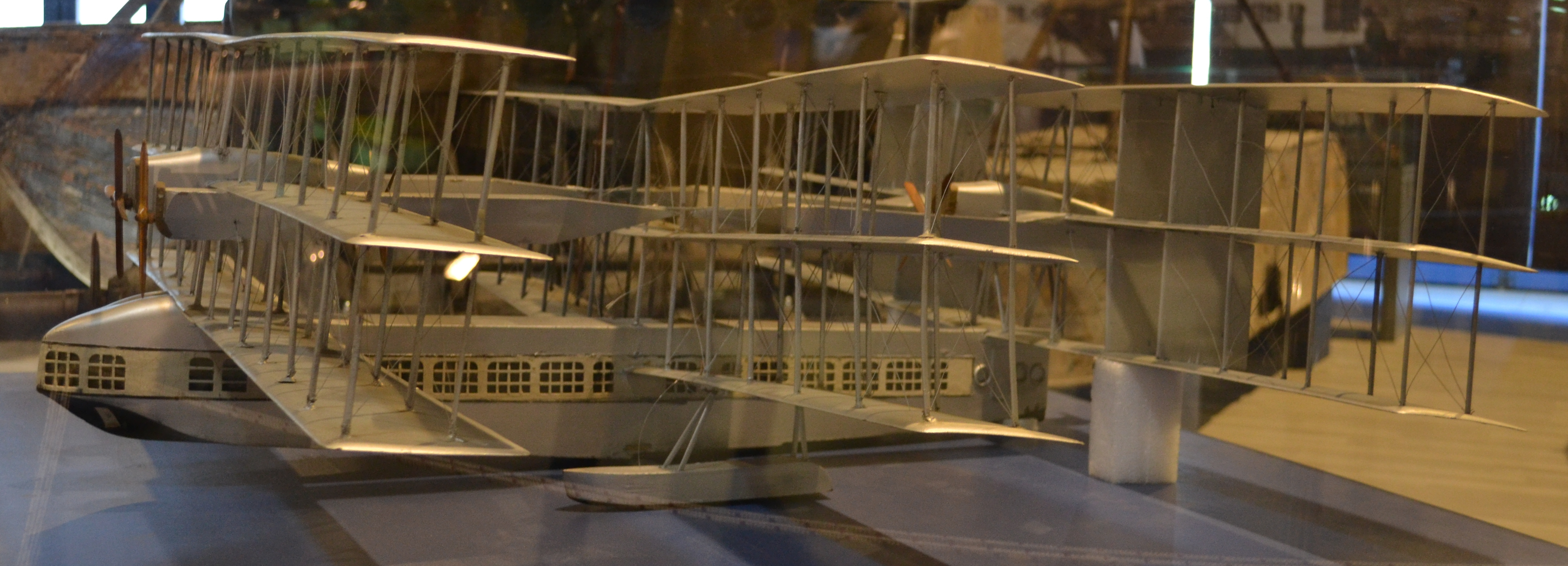
A 1920s model of the Caproni Ca.60 Transaereo on display at the museum.

Caproni Ca.100
The Caproni Ca.100, also known as Caproncino, was a single-engine multirole biplane floatplane which was built and served in great numbers in Italy during the 1930s; some of the Ca.100s that survived the war remained in service until the 1960s. The Caproncino on display at the Gianni Caproni Museum of Aeronautics, one of the five current survivors, was built as a land-based aircraft, flying for the first time in 1936. It was converted into a floatplane in 1960 and was operated by the Aero Club Como until 1964. It was donated to the Caproni Museum in 1970 and was on display at Vizzola Ticino for a period. It was moved to Rovereto, where it underwent restoration in 1990.

Caproni Ca.163
The Caproni Ca.163 light training biplane, designed in the late 1930s as a replacement for the ageing Ca.100, was built as a single prototype. It was restored in Rovereto in 1989 and it is very well preserved; it is believed that it could be put in flying conditions with relative ease.

Caproni Ca.193
The Caproni Ca.193 was the last aircraft the Caproni company designed and built in Milan. It was a four-seat, twin-engine light cargo and liaison aircraft. The single prototype was designed, built and first flown in the second half of the 1940s, while the company was facing a period of deep crisis; it was tested by the Aeronautica Militare, Italy's newly formed Air Force, which bought the prototype but refused to place orders for mass production. The only Ca.193 kept flying for the Italian Air Force until 1952, then passed to the Aero Club Trento, where it remained in service until 1960, and finally relocated to the Caproni Museum in Vizzola Ticino. It was moved to Trentino again in 1988, and underwent an extensive and difficult restoration process in 1991.

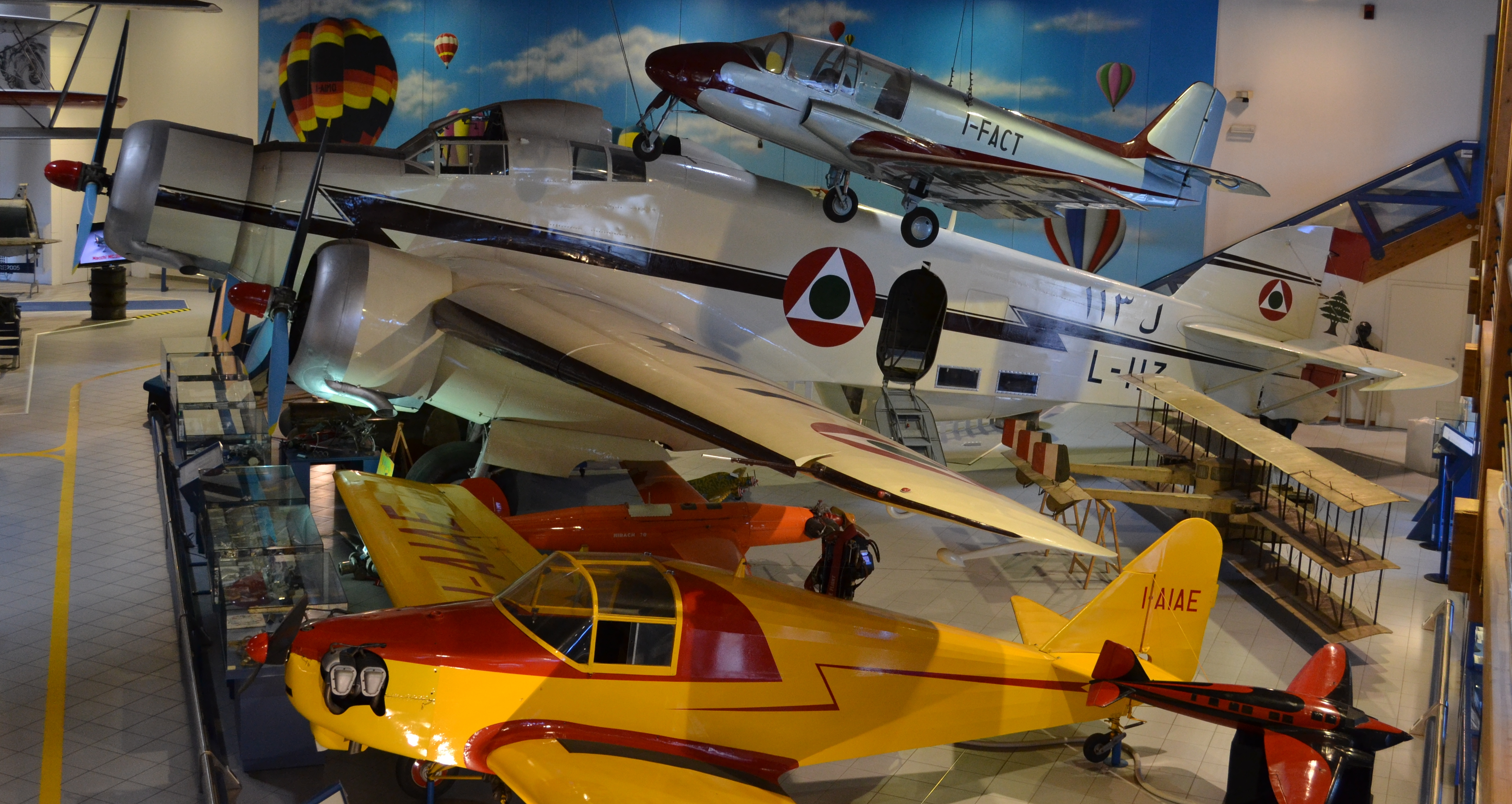
The Savoia-Marchetti S.79 (centre), the Avia FL.3 (bottom) and the Caproni Trento F.5 (top) on display at the Museo dell'Aeronautica Gianni Caproni.

Caproni Trento F.5
The Caproni Trento F.5 was a single-engine jet training aircraft that featured an entirely wooden and extremely light structure. It was flight tested with considerable success in the early 1950s, and the prototype was soon bought by the Italian Air Force. However, the serious financial difficulties of the Caproni company prevented it from being able to establish a production status. The aircraft kept flying until the end of the 1950s and was deeded to the Gianni Caproni Museum of Aeronautics in 1990. It was restored in 1991 and is the only aircraft in the museum to have been built by Caproni in Trentino.

Caproni Vizzola C-22J
The Caproni Vizzola C-22J was the last aircraft to be built by the Caproni company. A light twin-jet trainer and multirole airplane, it featured an extremely small and lightweight fiberglass structure and was particularly easy and inexpensive to operate and maintain. It was first flown in 1980; a few prototypes were built, but the type did not enter production. The C-22J on display at the museum is an original mock-up built by Caproni engineers in the 1980s; it is very well preserved, and did not undergo any restoration.

Fokker D.VIII
The German fighter Fokker D.VIII, held among of the best aircraft built during World War I, was a cantilever parasol wing monoplane which was introduced in October 1918, shortly before the end of the conflict. The fuselage on display at the Gianni Caproni Museum of Aeronautics belongs to the only D.VIII to have survived to the present day; it entered service in the last days of October 1918 but didn't see any combat action before the Armistice. It was handed to the Italian armed forces in 1919–1920 as a part of the postwar indemnification programme. It underwent a long series of tests with the Italian military, then it was bought by the Caproni Museum and put on display at Taliedo, where it remained until 1940. The Fokker D.VIII then was stored in several museum warehouses until 1988, when the fuselage, engine and propeller were restored. As of 2012, the restoration of the wing and of the empennage has not been completed yet; eventually, all the parts of the aircraft will be reassembled together.

Gabardini G.51bis
The Gabardini G.51 was an Italian single-engine two-seater aerobatic biplane trainer; it was designed in 1925 and 10 were built, including those belonging to the G.51bis version. They kept flying until 1935, all operated by the flight school of Cameri, Italy. The aircraft on display at the museum, a G.51bis, was built in 1928 and withdrawn from service in 1935; it was restored by Rovereto company Masterfly in 1988. As of 2012, it is the only Gabardini aircraft on public display; it is still in flying condition.

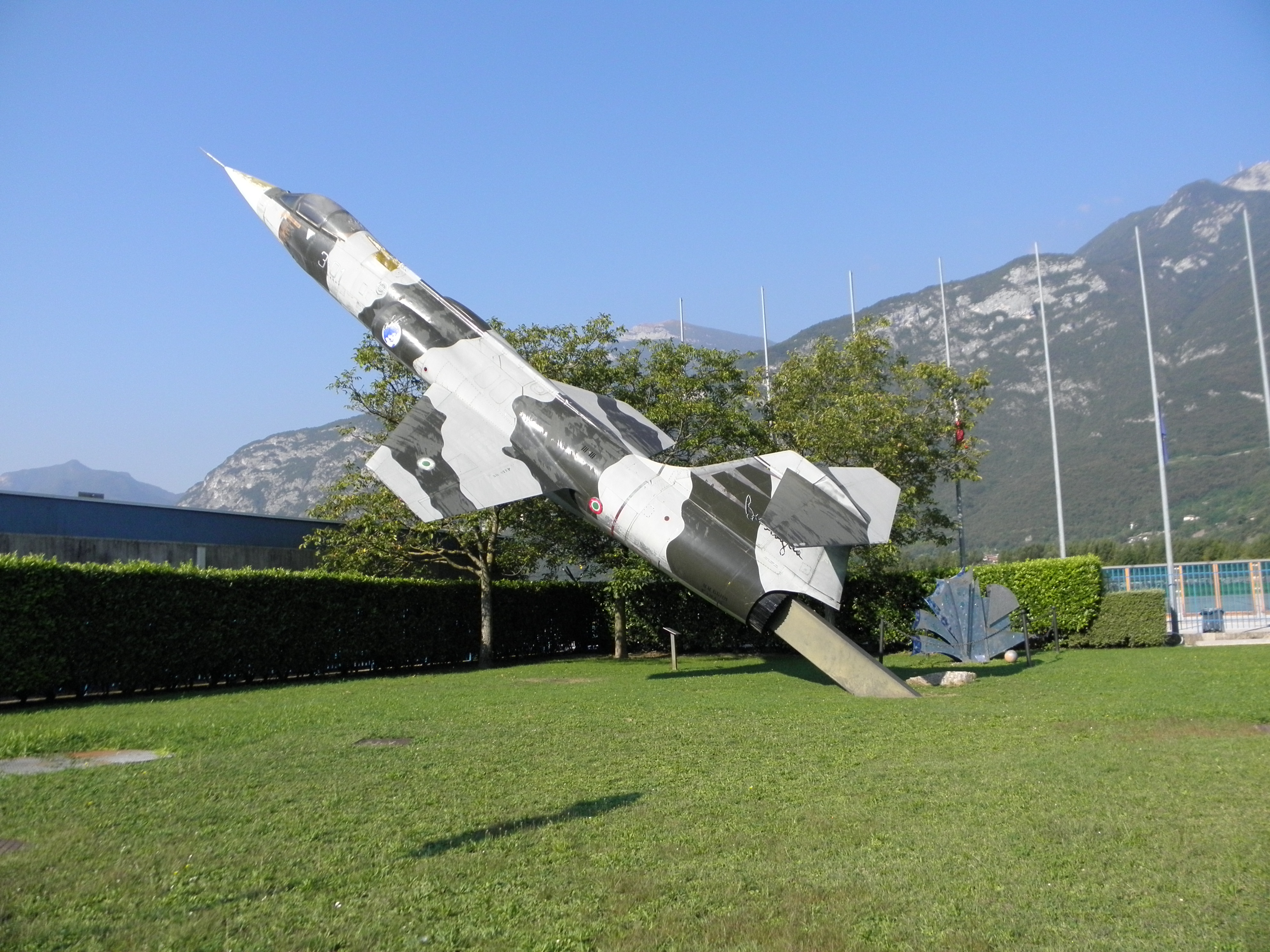
A former Aeronautica Militare Lockheed F-104G Starfigher stands as the gate guardian of the airport and adjacent museum.

Lockheed F-104G Starfighter
The United States Mach-2 Lockheed F-104 Starfighter fighter was operated by the Italian Air Force for many years between 1960 and the end of the 20th century. An F-104G (MM6609), is located at the entrance of the airport-museum complex. It was withdrawn from military service in 1990, donated to the Gianni Caproni Museum of Aeronautics in 1991 and mounted on a pylon (pointed to the sky) in 1992.

Macchi M.20
The Macchi M.20 was a small general aviation/training biplane, designed and first flown shortly after the end of World War I. It remained in service until the outbreak of World War II. The M.20 currently on display at the museum was built in the first half of the 1920s and was then owned by several individuals and flying clubs; it became a part of the collection of the Caproni Museum in the 1970s, and was then exhibited in Vizzola Ticino. It underwent a difficult restoration process in 1988–1990. As of 2012, it is the most ancient surviving Macchi original design in Italy.

Macchi MB.308
The Macchi MB.308 was the first aircraft that the Macchi company managed to put into production in the post-World War II period. It was a two-seater monoplane training aircraft featuring a completely wooden structure; more than 180 were built. The museum's example served briefly with the Italian Air Force in 1950, and was donated to the Aero Club Milano in the same year; at the end of 1950, it was sold to a private citizen who donated it to the Caproni Museum in 1972. It was restored in 1989.

Macchi M.C.200
The Macchi M.C.200, a single-seater monoplane fighter aircraft equipped with a radial engine, was Regia Aeronautica's most important fighter between 1940 and 1943. On display at the Gianni Caproni Museum of Aeronautics are the front part of the fuselage, the tail cone and empennage, and the Fiat A.74 RC.38 engine of a M.C.200. Along with a Reggiane Re.2005, it became a part of the permanent exhibition in 2010.

Manzolini Libellula II
The Manzolini Libellula II was an Italian 1950s experimental helicopter; its most notable feature was a pair of contra-rotating coaxial rotors that made the tail rotor unnecessary. Two prototypes were built, the second of which is on display at the museum; they were flown between 1952 and the 1960s. The type did not go into production.

North American T-6 Texan
The North American T-6 Texan, two-seat, low-wing monoplane training aircraft, equipped with a single radial engine, was one of the most famous and widely produced training aircraft in aviation history, entering production in 1937 and in some countries, it remained in service until the 1980s. The T-6 on display at the Gianni Caproni Museum of Aeronautics served with the Italian Air Force and, after being stored in the museum's warehouse for several years, it was added to the permanent collection at the opening of the new hangar in 2011.

Saiman 202M
The Saiman 202 was a two-seater monoplane single-engine military trainer; first flown in 1938, it was built in more than 400 units; these were operated by both the Regia Aeronautica and the Luftwaffe during the war and by the Aeronautica Militare after the end of the conflict. The Saiman 202M on display at the Gianni Caproni Museum of Aeronautics was built in 1943 and remained in military service until 1951; it kept flying in the Aero Club Bologna until 1962. After being moved to Trentino, it was restored by Rovereto company, Masterfly.

Savoia-Marchetti S.79
The Savoia-Marchetti S.79 three-engine torpedo bomber was among the most famous Italian aircraft of World War II. The S.79 on display in Trento (one of the two surviving aircraft of this type) was built in 1942 and took part in several combat missions before the Italian armistice of September 1943; the aircraft and its crew then passed over to the Allies and resumed flying with cargo duties until 1948 – at first, as part of the Italian Co-Belligerent Air Force and, later, with the Aeronautica Militare. In 1949, the aircraft was obtained by Lebanon, where it remained in service until 1959. The S.79 was subsequently donated to the Italian Air Force, which entrusted it to the Gianni Caproni Museum of Aeronautics and was relocated to its current location in Trento in 1993.

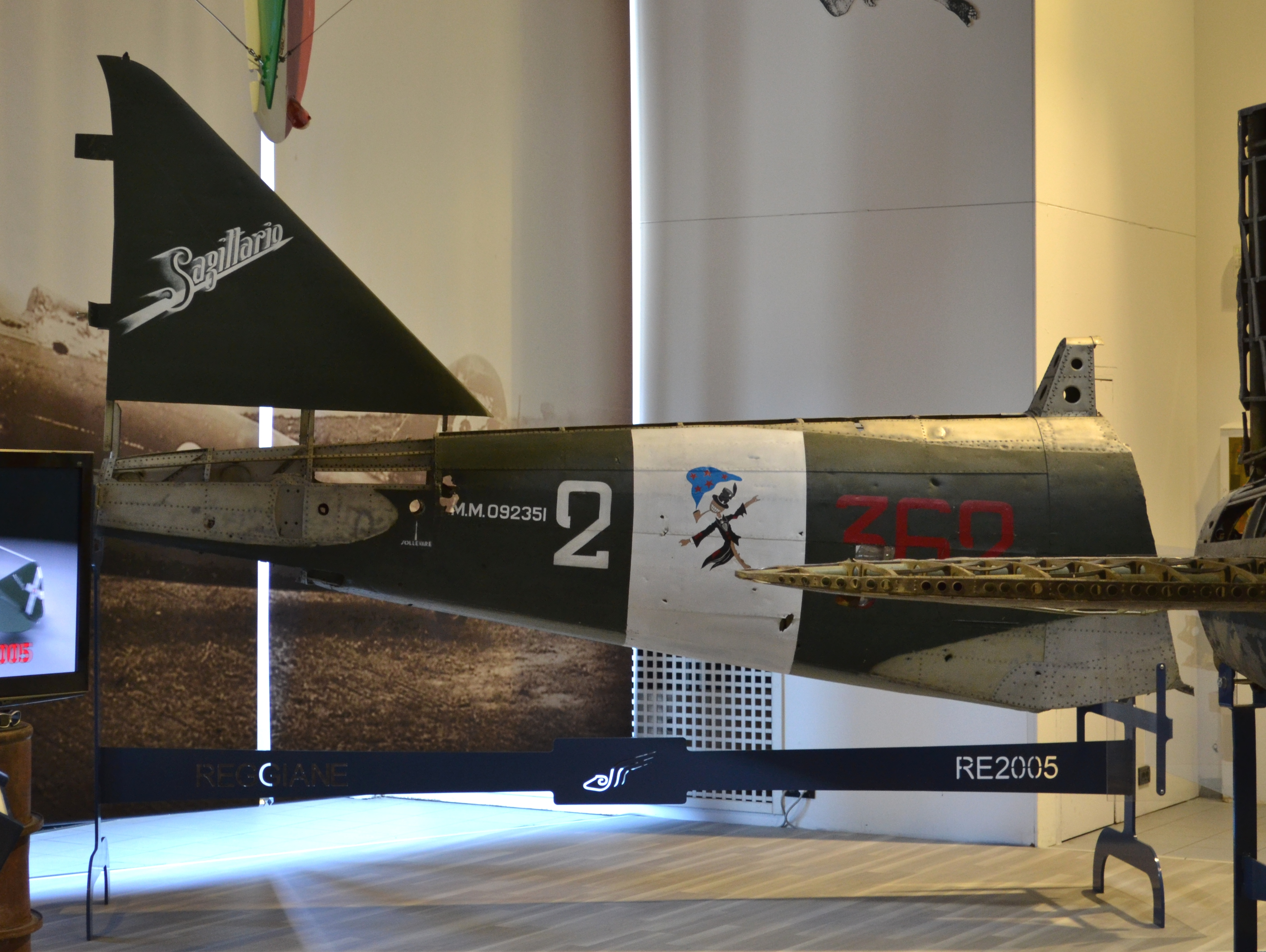
The Gianni Caproni Museum of Aeronautics' Re.2005 (only its fuselage and vertical stabilizer have survived) is the only existing aircraft of its type.

Reggiane Re.2005
The Reggiane Re.2005, a single-seat, single engine monoplane fighter, was one of the most modern Italian fighters built during World War II. It made its maiden flight in May 1942, but the Armistice prevented the type from being produced in substantial numbers. The Gianni Caproni Museum of Aeronautics displays the only known survivor's fuselage, tail cone and vertical stabilizer. Built in the first half of 1943, this aircraft belonged to the 22º Gruppo Autonomo Caccia Terrestre and operated until September 1943. It was found after the war near its air base in Capodichino, not far from Naples. Subsequently, the city's university took possession of the aircraft for several years. The aircraft was purchased by the Caproni Museum in the 1970s and it became a part of the permanent exhibition in 2010.

=== Relics and reconstructions ===
Besides the aircraft in the Gianni Caproni Museum of Aeronautics collection (some of which have survived with no damage or have been restored while others have only survived as components), the museum houses and displays many other artifacts of historical importance: engines, propellers, instruments and components of aircraft, airships and other flying machines as well as documents, medals, models, photographs and personal memorabilia. (Note: The total number of the items in the overall Caproni collections is unquantifiable and it would be impossible to list all of them.) Among the most noteworthy, however, the following can be cited: the Piaggio P.XIbis R.C.40D engine that equipped the Caproni Ca.161bis which, in 1938, established an altitude world record for piston-engine aircraft which stands to the present day; a fragment of the Blériot XI that Jorge Chávez successfully completed the first air crossing of the Alps in 1910; the wing rib of a Wright brothers biplane; Guglielmo Marconi's radio which he used for the first communication by air balloons and airships, and the fuel tank of a Supermarine Spitfire which crashed in Italy during World War II.

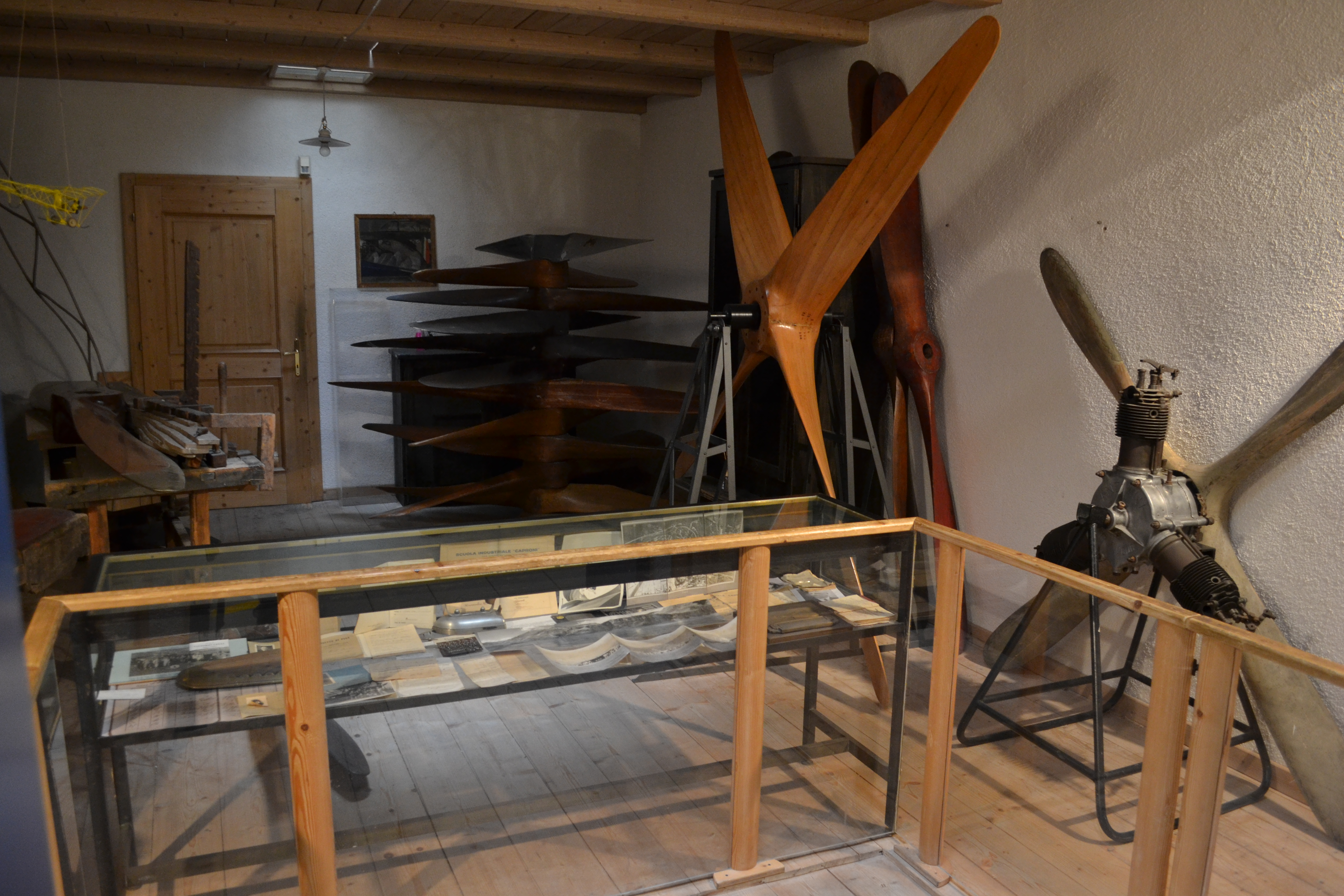
The museum display of a 1920s airscrew/propeller factory.

The Gianni Caproni Museum of Aeronautics also houses the reconstruction of Gianni Caproni's design study. It also features a reconstruction of a 1920s propeller manufacturing workshop, built by Caproni.

=== Fine arts ===
At the time of his studies at the Technical University of Munich and the University of Liège, Gianni Caproni developed a great interest in the fine arts. For some time before 1910, although his interest in painting and sculpture was intense, he decided that aviation would become the focus of his professional activity. Caproni, however, didn't lose the artistic sensibility he had acquired thanks to the influences of mitteleuropean secessions and avant-garde movements.

In the 1910s, Caproni came in contact with a number of artists, with whom he often had close personal relations. When his financial situation improved as his aeronautical company became more established and recognized as both a commercial and technological success, he started supporting them and commissioning artwork – acting as an actual patron of the arts. This was the case, for example, with Italian artist Luigi Bonazza; he was employed in Caproni's technical drawing office in 1915, and was later able to produce notable artwork in which the Jugendstil decorativism was combined with themes and subjects typical of technical drawing.

Influenced by her own sensibility and knowledge of the arts, his wife, Timina Caproni, also started to contribute as a patron and added to the family's art collection. Their interest moved from simple, traditional naturalism to the new expressive forms of the futurist movement; the latter featured an affinity for action and speed that was manifest in celebrating flight. The Caproni collection then kept expanding; later futurist paintings, along with works of art belonging to the movement of the so-called aeropittura, or aeropainting, were bought by Gianni and Timina and thus became a part of their growing legacy. The Capronis directly collaborated with artists like Fortunato Depero, Alfredo Ambrosi and Emilio Monti. Among others, they acquired artwork by Giacomo Balla, Tato, Fillia, Corrado Cagli, Benedetta Cappa, Amerigo Contini, Tullio Crali, Gerardo Dottori and Mario Sironi.

When the Gianni Caproni Museum of Aeronautics was established in its current site, supported by provisions in the will of Maria Fede Caproni, the daughter of Gianni and Timina, many of the most notable artwork in the Caproni collection were moved to Trento. Some of them are on display in the same museum premises that house the aircraft («thus re-establishing the unity of the cultural project envisioned by Gianni and Timina Caproni»); moreover, all the most noteworthy artwork of the collection was gathered and exhibited in 2007–2008 on the occasion of the temporary exhibition, La collezione Caproni, held at the G. Segantini civic art gallery of Arco.

=== Temporary exhibitions ===
The Gianni Caproni Museum of Aeronautics periodically hosts temporary exhibitions dealing with various aspects of aviation history. Those that were held in the past were about topics such as art, flight simulation, aerial photography, general aviation or the history and elements of design of an aircraft in particular (as exemplified with the Caproni Ca.1 and the Caproni Ca.100 exhibitions).

=== Library ===
The Gianni Caproni Museum of Aeronautics in the main headquarters of the Museo Tridentino di Scienze Naturali in Via Calepina, 10 in Trento, also has an extensive, specialized library. It features a large collection of documents about aviation history that are made available to the public for research purposes.

== See also ==
- Caproni
- List of aerospace museums
