= CA-20 =

CA-20 may refer to:

- California State Route 20, a highway in the U.S. state of California
- California's 20th congressional district, a congressional district in California
- Caproni Ca.20, an experimental monoplane
