= CA9 =

CA9, CA 9, CA-9 or Ca.9 may refer to:

- California State Route 9, a highway in the US state of California
- California's 9th congressional district
- United States Court of Appeals for the Ninth Circuit
- Carbonic anhydrase 9, an enzyme
- Caproni Ca.9, an airplane model from the early 1910s
