= Caproni Ca.6 =

Biplane

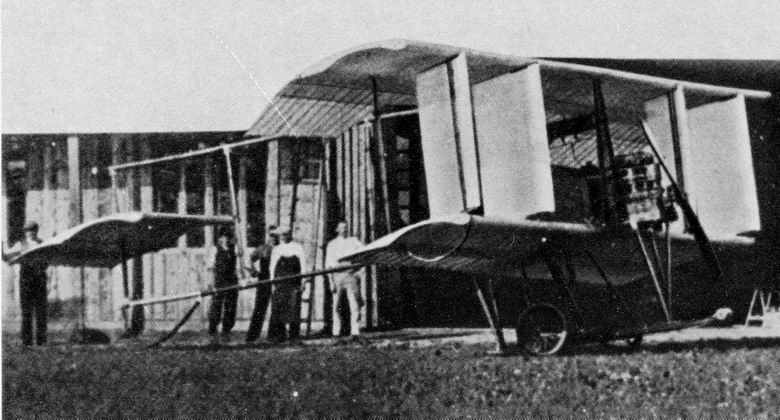

General information
- Type: pioneering aircraft
- Manufacturer: Caproni
- Status: Retired
- Number built: 1

History
- First flight: 1911

The Caproni Ca.6 was a single-engine biplane, designed and built by Caproni in the early 1910s.

== Design ==
The Ca.6 was a single-engine propeller-driven biplane with a traditional configuration with wings in the bow and tail fletching, but it had no fuselage : it was replaced by a light structure formed by two beams of unshelled wood and some vertical reinforcing uprights that supported the planes of tail. They were composed only of a stabilizer - horizontal balancer; the lack of a vertical drift was compensated by four large interwoven surfaces that, placed between the wings, contributed to the stability of the aircraft around the vertical axis. The wings resumed the double curvature profile that had also characterized Caproni aircraft immediately preceding, but with not very lucky results: the aerodynamic characteristics of this type of profile, which had been suggested to Caproni by his friend and colleague Henri Coandă, proved to be once again unsatisfactory.

== Preservation ==
The Caproni Ca.6 was preserved inside the Caproni workshops until 1934, when it was brought to Milan to be shown to the public on the occasion of the Italian Air Force Exhibition. In the meantime, in 1927, the spouses Gianni and Timina Caproni founded the Caproni Museum, in whose headquarters in Taliedo the Ca.6 found a place starting from the forties. After the vicissitudes linked to the Second World War and the reopening of the museum in Vizzola Ticino, the Ca.6 was again exposed to the public. He found his definitive position in the Museo dell'Aeronautica Gianni Caproni, reopened in Trento, in the nineties.

The aircraft underwent a first renovation-conservation operation before being exposed in Milan, in the early thirties : it was probably on this occasion that the leading edge of the wings was reinforced with a metal strip and the fuselage and the wings themselves they were shortened. At the time of its transfer to Trento, the Ca.6 has undergone a new intervention; however, due to the lack of availability of reliable technical drawings and other necessary historical documentation, a real restoration did not take place, but only a conservation procedure.

== Specifications ==
Data from Aeroplani Caproni – Gianni Caproni ideatore e costruttore di ali italiane

General characteristics

- Length: 9.8 m (32 ft 2 in)
- Wingspan: 12 m (39 ft 4 in)
- Height: 3.27 m (10 ft 9 in)
- Wing area: 45 m^{2} (480 sq ft)
- Gross weight: 318 kg (700 lb)
- Powerplant: 1 × Rebus 50hp 4-cyl 4-cylinder water-cooled in-line piston engine, 37 kW (50 hp)
- Propellers: 2-bladed fixed pitch propeller

Performance

== Related entries ==
- Giovanni Battista Caproni
- Museo dell'Aeronautica Gianni Caproni
