= Caproni Trento F-5 =

1952 Italian jet trainer aircraft

Caproni Trento F.5
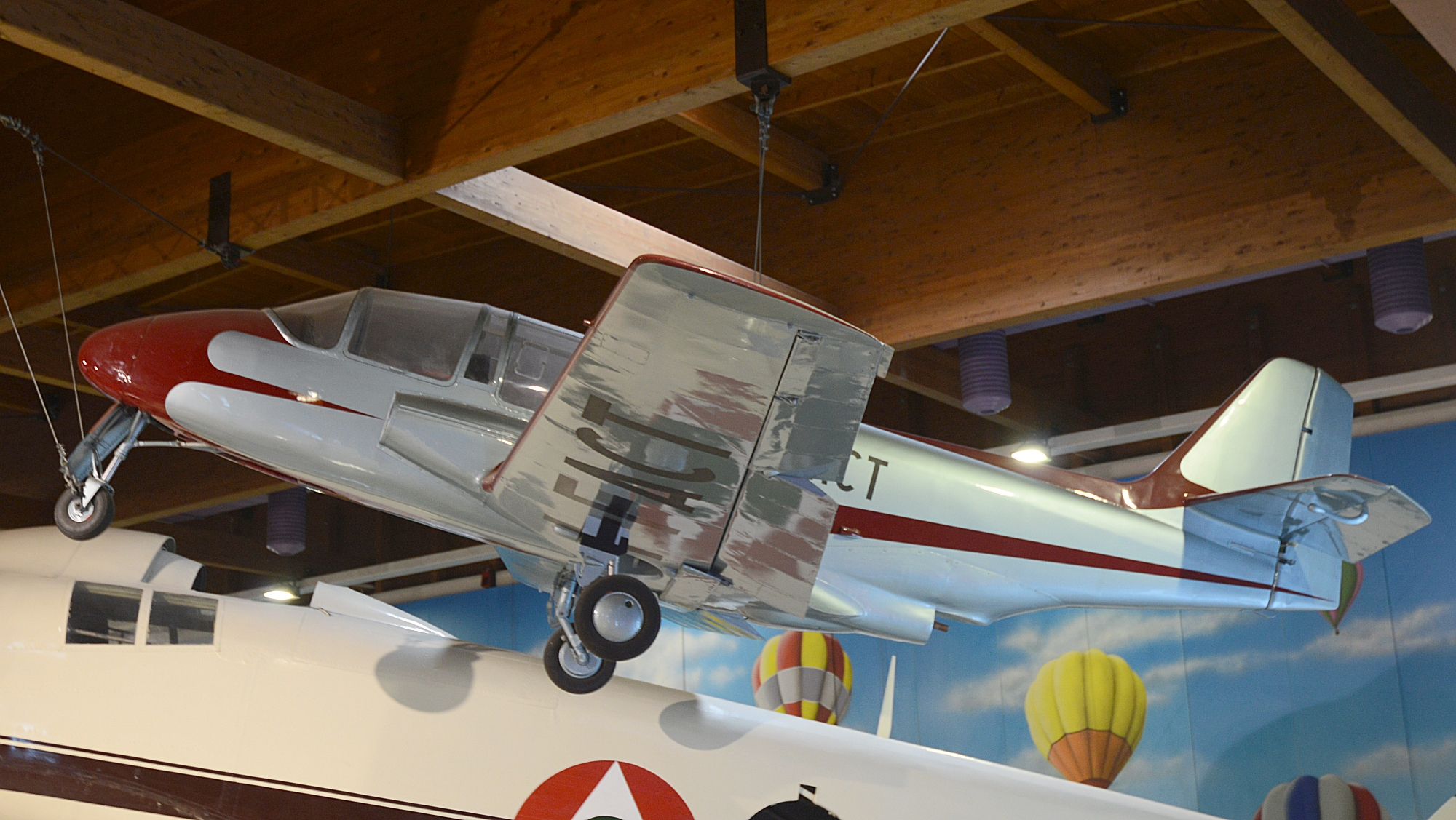

General information
- Type: Lightweight two-seat jet trainer
- National origin: Italy
- Manufacturer: Aeroplane Caproni Trento
- Designer: Stelio Frati
- Primary user: Italian Air Force
- Number built: 1

History
- First flight: 20 May 1952

The Caproni Trento F.5 was a small Italian two-seat trainer designed by Stelio Frati and built by Aeroplani Caproni Trento. The F.5 was not ordered into production and only a prototype was built.

== Design and development ==
By the 1950s the Caproni company had collapsed and could not survive the postwar economic problems. One of the few group members to continue working was Aeroplane Caproni Trento, based at Gardola in Trento. Originally involved with aircraft maintenance and support, the company decided to design and build a small jet trainer in 1951. The F.5 aircraft was designed by Stelio Frati based on his earlier glider work. It was a low-wing all-wood monoplane with retractable tricycle landing gear. The engine was a small Turbomeca Palas turbojet located in the fuselage. It had two inlet ducts, one either side of the fuselage and the exhaust was below the rear fuselage. It had an enclosed cabin with tandem seating for an instructor and student and was fitted with a jettisonable canopy.

The F.5 made its maiden flight on 20 May 1952. It was the first jet aircraft developed in postwar Italy. Although evaluated by the Italian Air Force it gained little interest and was not ordered into production.

== Operators ==
Italy

- Italian Air Force one aircraft for evaluation test

== Aircraft on display ==
The prototype, registered I-FACT, and only F.5 is on display at the Museo dell'Aeronautica Gianni Caproni in Trento.

== Specifications ==
Data from The Illustrated Encyclopedia of Aircraft

General characteristics

- Crew: two
- Length: 6.60 m (21 ft 7.75 in)
- Wingspan: 7.85 m (25 ft 9 in)
- Wing area: 10.00 m^{2} (107.64 sq ft)
- Empty weight: 470 kg (1,036 lb)
- Gross weight: 750 kg (1,653 lb)
- Powerplant: 1 × Turbomeca Palas turbojet , 1.5 kN (331 lbf) thrust

Performance

- Maximum speed: 360 km/h (224 mph, 195 kn)
- Service ceiling: 8,000 m (26,245 ft)
