= Trento-Mattarello Airport =

Trento-Mattarello (G.Caproni) Airport Aeroporto di Trento-Mattarello
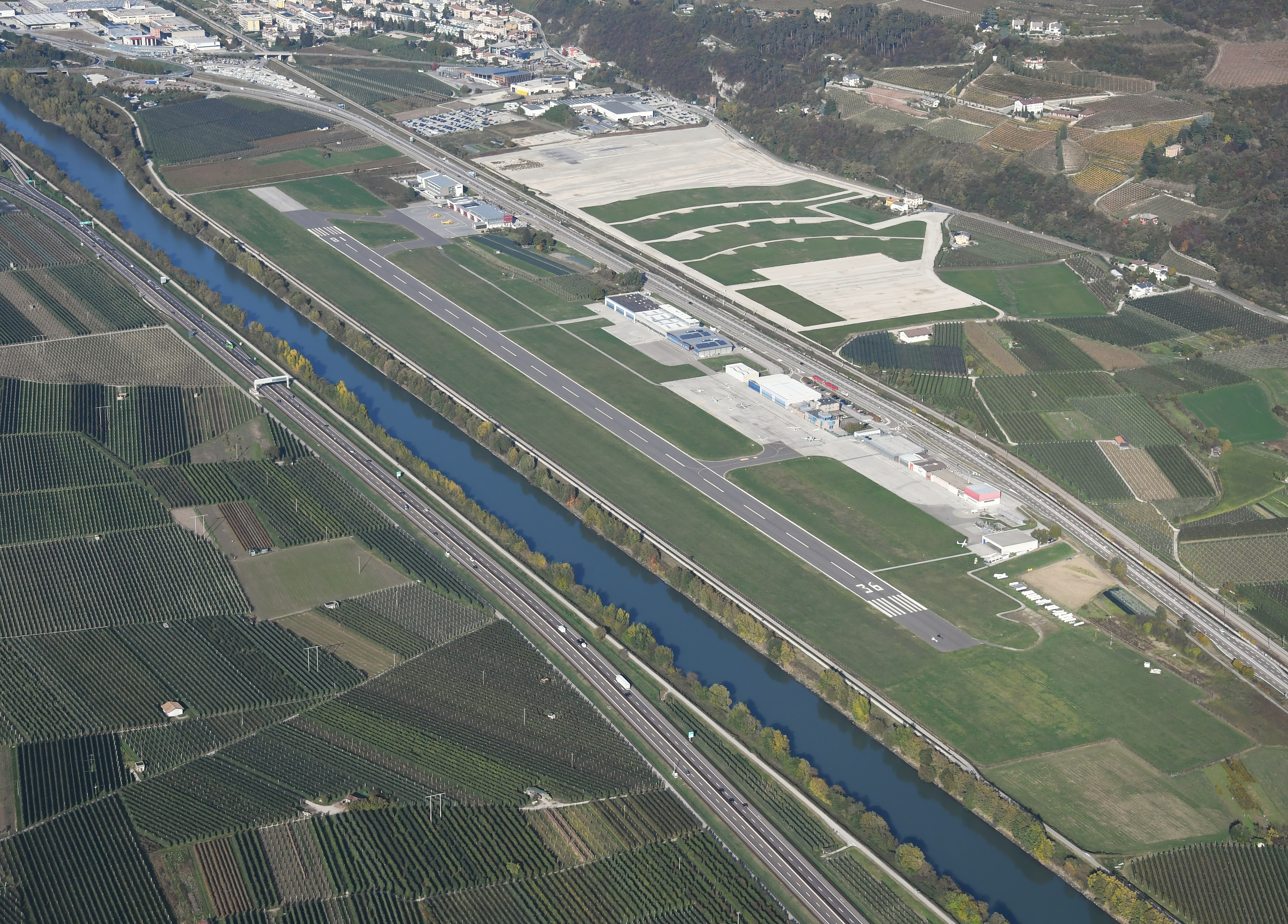
- IATA: N/A; ICAO: LIDT

Summary
- Airport type: Public
- Operator: Trentino Trasporti
- Serves: Trento
- Location: Trento, Italy
- Elevation AMSL: 610 ft / 186 m
- Coordinates: 46°01′24″N 011°07′30″E

Map
- Location in Italy

Runways
Direction	Length		Surface
Direction	m	ft	Surface
18/36	1,130	3,707	Concrete/Asphalt
- Source: Italian AIP

Trento-Mattarello Airport (Italian: Aeroporto di Trento-Mattarello; ICAO: LIDT), also known as Aeroporto G.Caproni, is an airfield located at Trentino, 3.4 NM (6.3 km; 3.9 mi) south of Trento, Italy.

The airport is at an elevation of 610 feet (186 m) above mean sea level. It has one runway designated 18/36 with an asphalt surface measuring 1,130 by 30 metres (3,707 ft × 98 ft).

== Facilities ==
There is an airport hotel on site Fly Bike Hotel, along with a Bar-Restaurant.

The Gianni Caproni Museum of Aeronautics is located at the airport.

== Operations ==
The airport is home to numerous flying schools and clubs. Additionally, the Protezione Civile has a fleet of helicopters stationed at the airport.

== Transportation ==
=== Bus ===
There is no direct bus service to the airport; however, within a 20-minute walk from the airport terminal (1.5 km [0.9 mi]), Parcheggio Via Lidorno offers a bus service into town.

=== Car ===
The airport is nestled between the SS12 and A22 roads, the latter of which connects Trento with the cities of Verona and Bolzano. Access to the airport is quick and easy from both roads.
