= Caproni Ca.12 =

1910s Italian experimental aircraft

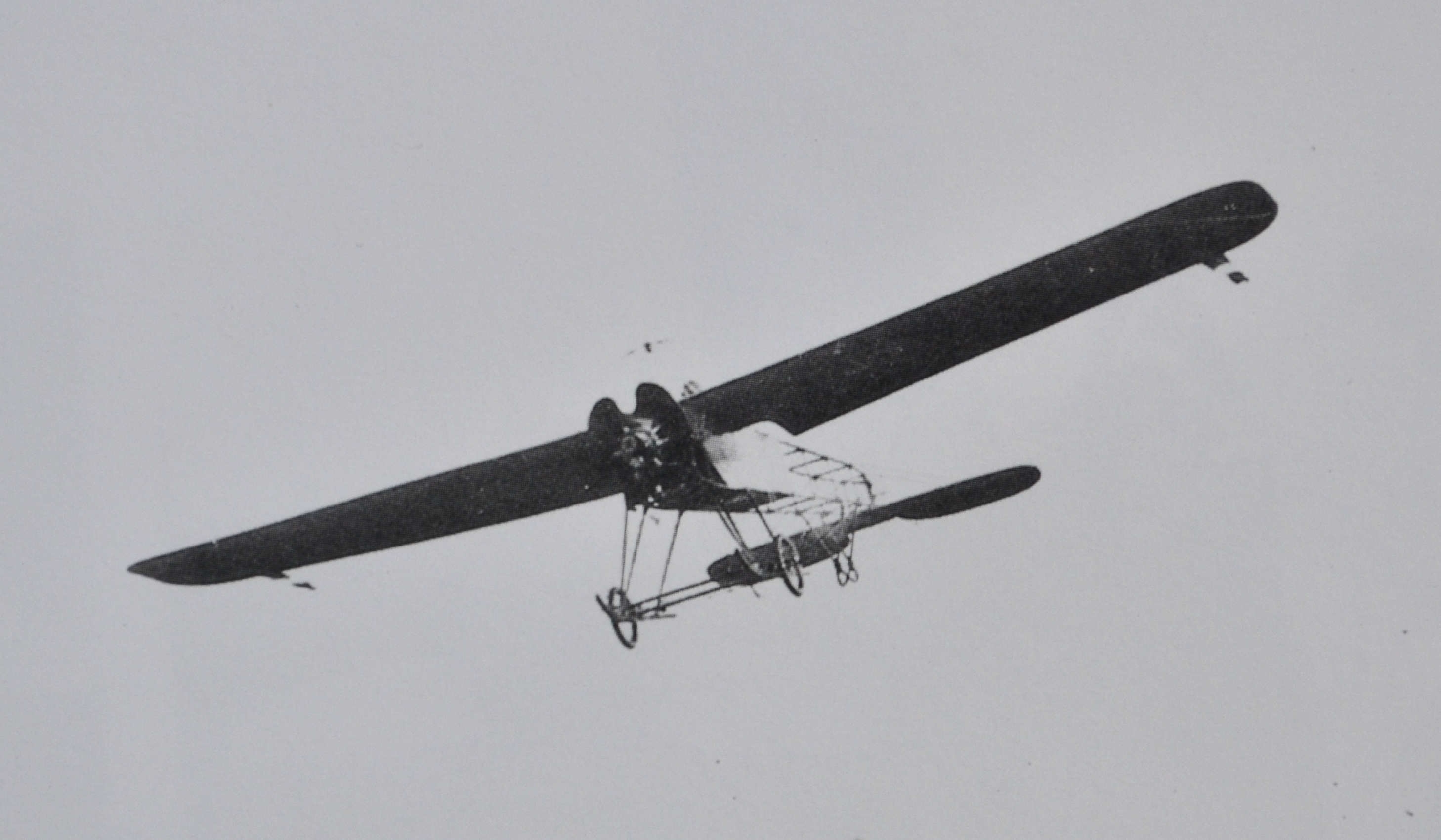

General information
- Type: Experimental aircraft
- Manufacturer: Caproni
- Status: Retired
- Number built: 1

History
- First flight: 1912

The Caproni Ca.12 was a two-seater single-engine monoplane built by Caproni in the early 1910s.

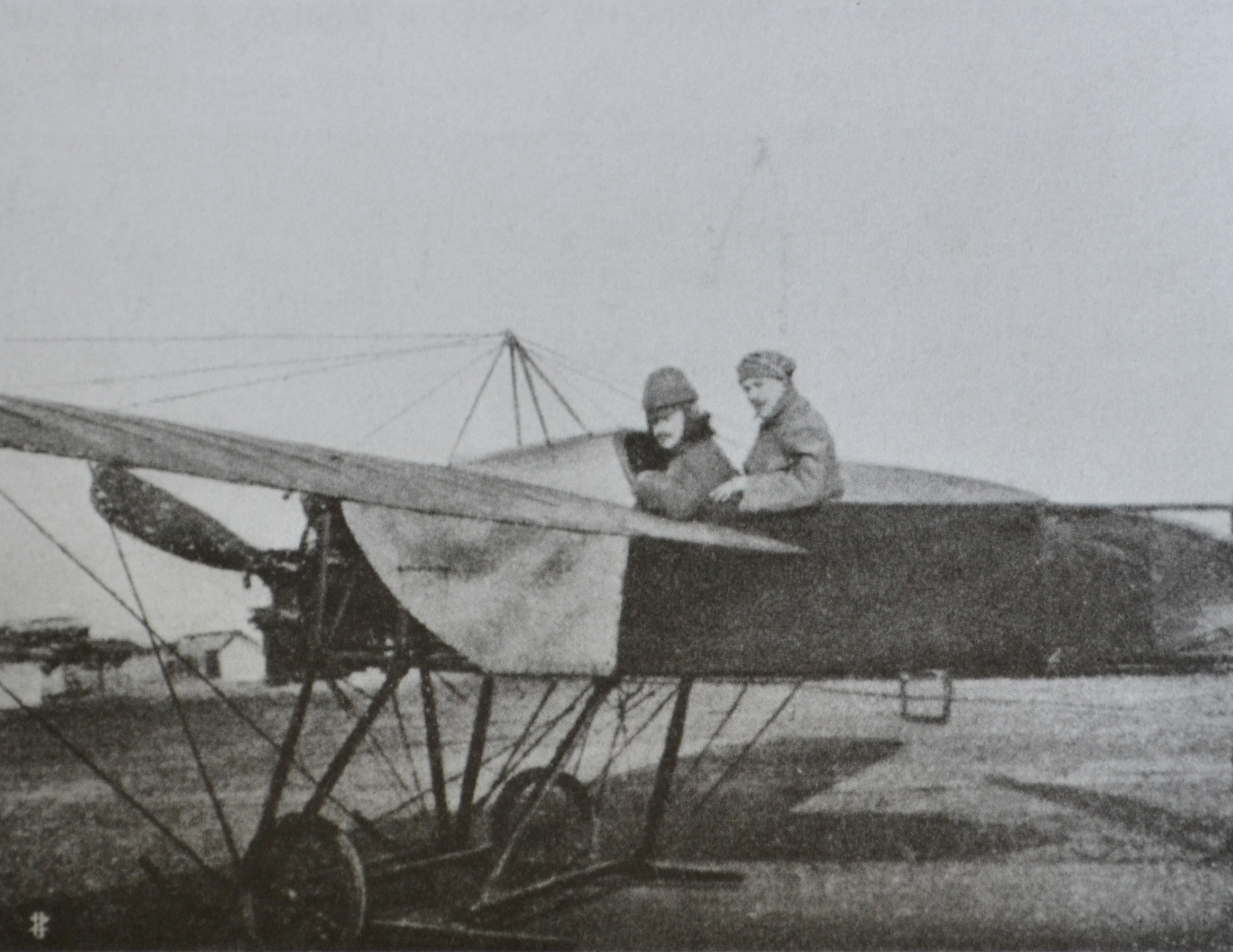
Ca.12with passenger

== Design ==
The Ca.12 was a modern high wing monoplane with a wooden structure and canvas covering, equipped with a wing warping system to control the roll and reinforced by metal tie rods connected to the fuselage and to a special structure placed above it; the fuselage was based on a wooden lattice structure, in turn reinforced by metal cables, and was covered in cloth only for the front half; the same wooden structure with a canvas covering characterized the empennages. The fixed undercarriage was composed of two front wheels with anti-overblank pads and another smaller, tailed shoe.

The Ca.12 differed from its immediate predecessors mainly due to the fact of being a two-seater, with the two cockpits arranged "in tandem" (i.e. one behind the other); moreover, the Ca.12 differed from the Ca.11 for the greatly enlarged wing opening and for the engine, a radial Anzani 6A3 6- cylinder double star capable of developing a power of 60 hp. Other versions of the same model were powered by 50 or 70 hp engines.

== Operational use ==
In the afternoon of March 20, 1912, the pilot Enrico Cobioni (who had obtained the flying license in the aviation school annexed to the Caproni workshops in Vizzola Ticino and had become a brilliant test driver, distinguishing among other things for the first flights on Caproni Ca. 9 and Ca.11 ) took off from the field of Vizzola aboard a standard Ca.12, a two-seater with 50 hp engine, and began to repeatedly travel a circuit of 5 km marked on the ground by six pylons. Driving the first 100 km (20 laps) in 56 min, the second 100 km in 57 min and the third 100 km back in 56 min, at an almost constant average speed of 106.5 km / h, Cobioni beat the world speed record both on the distance of 250 km and on that of 300 km, as well as on the duration of 3 h . [7] [8] The official nature of the test was guaranteed by the engineer Vogel, commissioner of the Italian Aviation Society (SIA), and by the commissioners added lieutenants Del Giudice and Garino. [8] [9] Cobioni, still having plenty of fuel and lubricant, nevertheless remained in flight and traveled another 30 km (6 laps) before the dark (it was now 8 pm) forced him to return to the ground; it is believed that the flight could have continued for a long time, as there still remained 45 of the original 94 liters of gasoline (48%) and 18 of the 58 liters of engine oil (31%).

On April 5 of the same year, the same Cobioni took off from Vizzola to Locarno and wanted to fly over Lake Maggiore . Despite it being a cloudy day, at 4:37 pm the aviator took flight and, having reached Lake Maggiore at Ispra and Ronco, flew over it without difficulty; he reached Locarno, on the opposite bank, 42 min 44 s after take-off (having covered 75 km at an average speed of 105.3 km/h) and landed after making some changes over the city.

A Ca.12 was the first aircraft in Italy to take a paying passenger, a certain Mr. Weil, photographed on board with Cobioni as the pilot. On April 16, always with Cobioni's commands, a Ca.12 (this time with a 60 HP Anzani engine) took off from Vizzola for a long non-stop flight (called, in the jargon of the time, raid ) to Adria, at the mouth of the Po . Originally, according to the Caproni project (eager for "successes [...] not only more impressive on the minds of the general public, but even more persuasive for the competent people") the goal of the raid should have been Pordenone, reachable from Vizzola with a path in a straight line thanks to the autonomy of Ca.12. However, Cobioni did not know the area that would have to fly well enough to orientate itself to the goal, and moreover on the chosen day there was a thick fog. It was therefore decided to follow the course of the river Ticino at low altitude up to the point where it flows into the Po, and to continue flying over it to the mouth, then veering along the Adriatic coast heading north towards Pordenone. [12] Cobioni took off at 5:40 and followed closely the courses of the Ticino and Po in all their loops; his passage was confirmed by the commissioners of the Italian Touring Club in Pavia, Ostiglia, Ferrara and Adria. Here, at 9:40 am, after traveling 449 km (a distance greater than that which, as the crow flies, separates Vizzola Ticino from Pordenone) at an average speed of 112 km / h, Cobioni was forced to land to refuel. Since Adria was not available for fuel, however, the raid had to be stopped and the plane, dismounted, was transported to Venice by train . It was also the longest non-stop flight completed in Italy until then. In Venice, starting from April 22, Cobioni made a series of demonstration flights that impressed the Venetian press and public. One of the flights performed on April 26 also took part Caproni and that same day, having paid a ticket to get on board, Commendatore Weil became the first paying passenger of an airplane in Italy.

On 11 June 1912, a Ca.12 with an engine of 50 CV Anzani beat the Italian record for maximum duration in flight with a passenger on board. Although the sky was cloudy, Cobioni took off with the pilot student of the school Caproni Fausto Minozzi and remained in the air for 3 h 12 min keeping an average speed of 114 km / h. The previous national record of duration with passenger was beaten by almost an hour, and it is believed that a record of speed would have been established if the test had been conducted on a properly prepared track. The SIA commissioners who formalized the test were the aforementioned and Vogel and the captains Moreno and Biego.

== Specifications ==
Data from Aeroplani Caproni – Gianni Caproni ideatore e costruttore di ali italiane

General characteristics

- Crew: Two
- Length: 8.40 m (27 ft 7 in)
- Wingspan: 11.28 m (37 ft 0 in)
- Wing area: 22 m^{2} (240 sq ft)
- Empty weight: 340 kg (750 lb)
- Gross weight: 590 kg (1,301 lb)
- Powerplant: 1 × Anzani 6-cylinder air-cooled radial piston engine, 37 kW (50 hp)
- Propellers: 2-bladed wooden fixed-pitch propeller

Performance

- Maximum speed: 110 km/h (68 mph, 59 kn)

== See also ==
- Giovanni Battista Caproni
- Museo dell'Aeronautica Gianni Caproni
