= Caproni Ca.193 =

Italian light utility aircraft

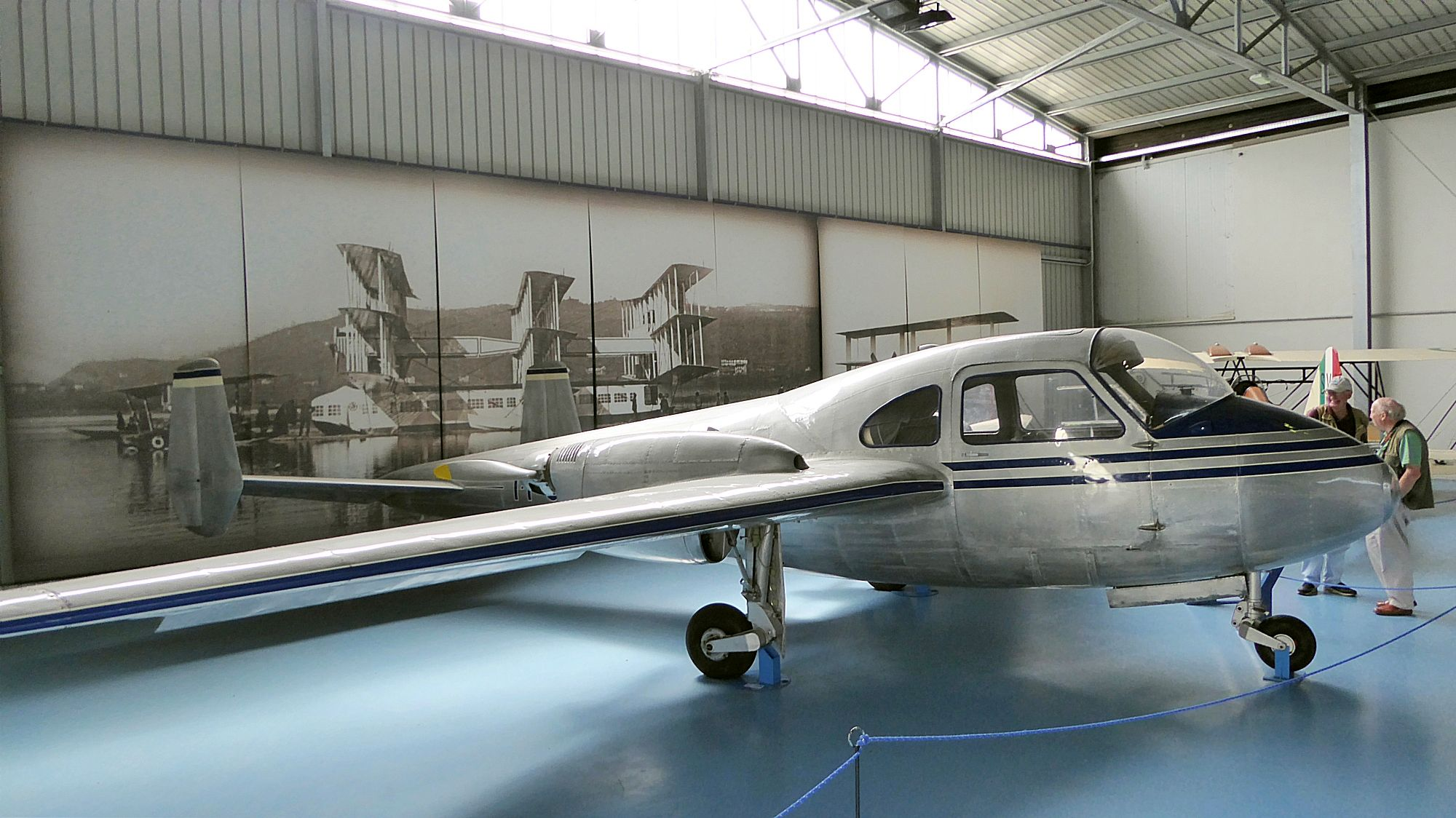

General information
- Type: Twin-engined 5/6 seat monoplane
- National origin: Italy
- Manufacturer: Caproni Taliedo
- Designer: Eng. Amilcare Porro and Antonio Longo
- Primary user: Italian Air Force
- Number built: 1

History
- First flight: 13 May 1949
- Retired: 1960

The Caproni Ca.193 was an Italian liaison and air-taxi aircraft that was offered to the Italian Air Force as an instrument flight trainer and to the Navy for liaison. Design work started in 1945 and only the prototype was built. It was the last aircraft the Caproni company designed and built in Milan.

== Design and development ==
The aircraft is of all-metal construction, with cantilever mid-wings with detachable tips. The leading edges are swept-back, and the stressed-skin wings have flaps inboard of the ailerons. The fuselage is a monocoque structure, with a hinged nose to allow loading of a stretcher or other awkward loads. Seating can be arranged for one pilot and five passengers, or two pilots and three passengers. There is a door on both sides of the cabin, and there is a baggage compartment behind the rear seats. The tailplane has twin fins at the ends of the dihedral stabiliser. The elevators and rudders are fabric-covered. The tricycle landing gear is hydraulically retractable. The two engines are mounted towards the rear of the wing, driving 2-bladed fixed-pitch pusher propellers. Originally planned to use Blackburn Cirrus Major III engines, it was fitted with Walter Minor 6-III engines.

== Operational history ==
The first flight of the prototype, registered I-POLO in reference to the designers, was flown by Tullio De Prato at Linate Airport, Milan, on 13 May 1949. The aircraft was then briefly tested by the military in Rome, but was returned to the manufacturer and no orders were forthcoming. Several variants were then considered, including the use of turboprop engines, a radar-equipped naval patrol version, and a 'colonial' model, but none was implemented.

The aircraft was purchased by the Air Force as MM56701 in March 1950, and in July 1952 it was sold for civilian use, ending up with the Trento Aero Club at Gardolo Airport, where it was withdrawn from use in 1960. It is now on display, after refurbishment in 1991, at the Gianni Caproni Museum of Aeronautics in Trento, Italy.

== Specifications ==
3-view layout

Data from Janes All the World's Aircraft 1949-50

General characteristics

- Crew: two
- Capacity: 3 to 5
- Length: 9.0 m (29 ft 6 in)
- Wingspan: 13.8 m (45 ft 3 in)
- Height: 2.49 m (8 ft 2 in)
- Wing area: 19.05 m^{2} (205 sq ft)
- Empty weight: 1,220 kg (2,585 lb)
- Gross weight: 1,900 kg (4,185 lb)
- Powerplant: 2 × Walter Minor 6-III 6-cylinder in-line piston engines , 119 kW (160 hp) each

Performance

- Maximum speed: 300 km/h (186 mph, 162 kn)
- Service ceiling: 5,400 m (17,710 ft)
