= SAIMAN 202 =

1930s Italian two-seat cabin monoplane

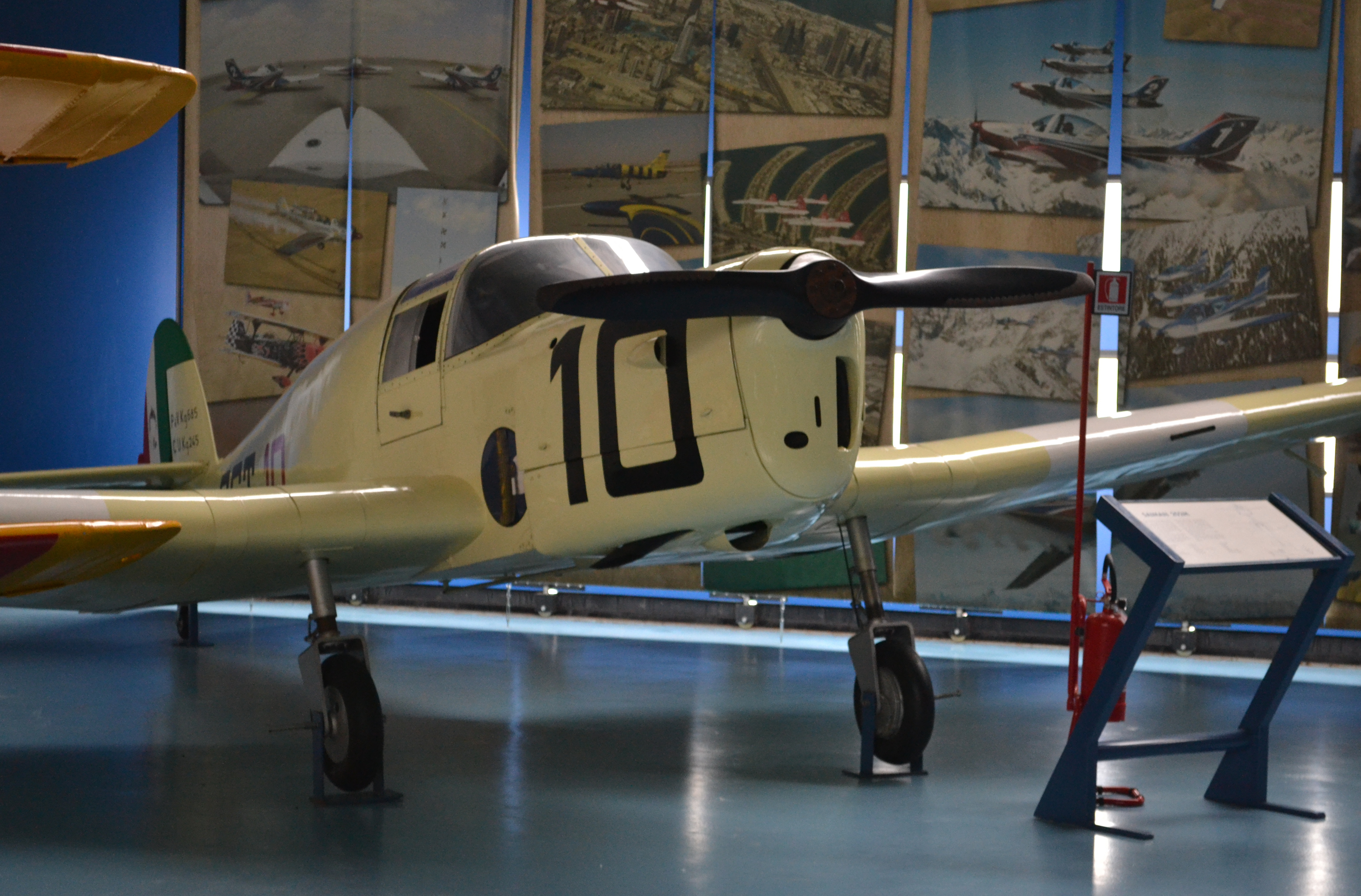
- A Saiman 202M is on display at the Gianni Caproni Museum of Aeronautics in Trento, Italy.

General information
- Type: Two-seat cabin touring monoplane
- Manufacturer: Società Industrie Meccaniche Aeronautiche Navali
- Designer: Mario Bottino
- Primary user: Italian Air Force
- Number built: 390

History
- Introduction date: 1939
- First flight: 1938
- Retired: 1951

The SAIMAN 202 was a 1930s Italian two-seat cabin monoplane designed and built by the Società Industrie Meccaniche Aeronautiche Navali (SAIMAN).

== Development ==
Designed in response to an Italian Air Ministry requirement for a two-seat cabin monoplane, the SAIMAN 202 prototype (registered I-BOTT) first flew in early 1938. The 202 was a low-wing cantilever monoplane with a fixed tailwheel landing gear. It had a nose-mounted 120 hp (74 kW) de Havilland Gipsy Major engine. An enclosed cockpit had side-by-side seating for two. The first production aircraft were for civilian use with Italian training organisations and designated SAIMAN 202bis. The 202bis had only minor cabin changes but the next variant (the 202/I) was a major re-design with an improved fuselage re-positioned tailplane. To compete in a 1939 touring aircraft rally two special aircraft were developed; a 202 RL with an Alfa Romeo 110 engine which were now standard for the civilian production aircraft, and the 204 R which was a four-seater with lengthened cabin and longer nose and powered by an Alfa Romeo 115 engine.

== Operational history ==
To meet an urgent operational requirement for military trainers, the Regia Aeronautica ordered a simplified version of the 202 RL as the 202/M in October 1939. CNA built 85, SACA built 65 and SAIMAN built 215 aircraft for the Regia Aeronautica flying schools. Aircraft were also used for liaison duties and Italian Air Attaches. A number of aircraft were captured.

== Variants ==
SAIMAN 202
Prototype with 120hp (74kW) de Havilland Gipsy Major engine.
SAIMAN 202bis
Civil production aircraft
SAIMAN 202/I
Improved version
SAIMAN 202 RL
One special variant for rally use.
SAIMAN 202/M
Military production aircraft, 365 built.
SAIMAN 204 R
One four-seat variant for rally use.

== Operators ==
Croatia

- Air Force of the Independent State of Croatia

Kingdom of Italy

- Regia Aeronautica
- Italian Co-Belligerent Air Force

Italy

- Italian Air Force operated some SAIMAN 202 until 1951

== Specifications ==
Data from

General characteristics

- Crew: 2
- Length: 7.65 m (25 ft 1.25 in)
- Wingspan: 10.66 m (34 ft 11.75 in)
- Height: 1.91 m (6 ft 3.25 in)
- Wing area: 17.66 m^{2} (190.10 sq ft)
- Empty weight: 670 kg (1,477 lb)
- Gross weight: 930 kg (2,050 lb)
- Powerplant: 1 × Alfa Romeo 110-1 inline piston engine , 89 kW (120 hp)

Performance

- Maximum speed: 220 km/h (137 mph, 119 kn)
- Range: 600 km (373 mi, 324 nmi)
- Service ceiling: 5,050 m (16,570 ft)

== See also ==
Related lists

- List of aircraft of World War II
