= Caproni Vizzola Ventura =

Type of aircraft

C22J Ventura
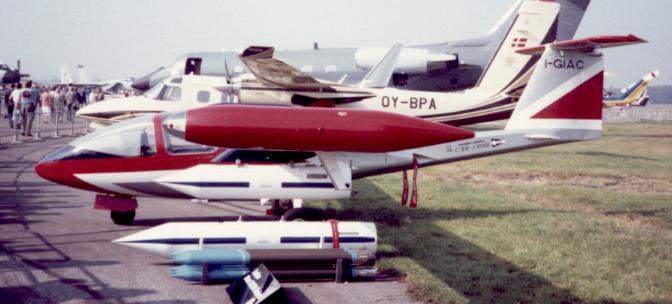
- Caproni Vizzola C-22J at Farnborough Air Show September 1982

General information
- Type: Military trainer aircraft
- Manufacturer: Caproni Vizzola

History
- First flight: 21 July 1980

The Caproni Vizzola C22 Ventura was a light jet-powered aircraft developed in Italy for use as a military trainer. It was of conventional sailplane configuration and bore a family resemblance to the Caproni Calif gliders, although the Ventura had an almost entirely metal structure. The student and instructor sat side by side under an expansive canopy, and weapons hardpoints were provided under each of the slender, high-mounted wings. It had retractable, tricycle undercarriage.

In 1981, Agusta acquired 50% of the C22 programme and proposed a new version, the C22R, which was to have been a reconnaissance aircraft also capable of Forward Air Control and ELINT operations. The basic C22J trainer was exhibited at the Farnborough Air Show in 1980 and September 1982, but failed to attract any customers, and the proposed C22R was never actually built.

== Specifications (C22J) ==
Data from Jane's All the World's Aircraft 1982–83

General characteristics

- Crew: two
- Length: 6.19 m (20 ft 4 in)
- Wingspan: 10.00 m (32 ft 10 in)
- Height: 1.88 m (6 ft 2 in)
- Wing area: 8.75 m^{2} (94.2 sq ft)
- Aspect ratio: 11.42:1
- Airfoil: Wortmann FX-67K-170
- Empty weight: 720 kg (1,587 lb)
- Max takeoff weight: 1,135 kg (2,502 lb)
- Fuel capacity: 290 L (64 imp gal; 77 US gal)
- Powerplant: 2 × Microturbo TRS 18-046 turbojets, 1.0 kN (220 lbf) thrust each

Performance

- Maximum speed: 480 km/h (300 mph, 260 kn) (max cruise, at sea level)
- Cruise speed: 324 km/h (201 mph, 175 kn) (econ cruise, at 3,000 m (10,000 ft))
- Stall speed: 120 km/h (75 mph, 65 kn) EAS, flaps down
- Never exceed speed: 560 km/h (350 mph, 300 kn)
- Range: 740 km (460 mi, 400 nmi) on internal fuel
- Endurance: 2 hr
- Service ceiling: 7,620 m (25,000 ft)
- g limits: +6.0, −3.0
- Rate of climb: 9.2 m/s (1,810 ft/min)

Armament

- Up to 200 kg (440 lb) of stores on underwing pylons
