= Caproni Ca.53 =

Italian WWI Italian bomber

Ca.53
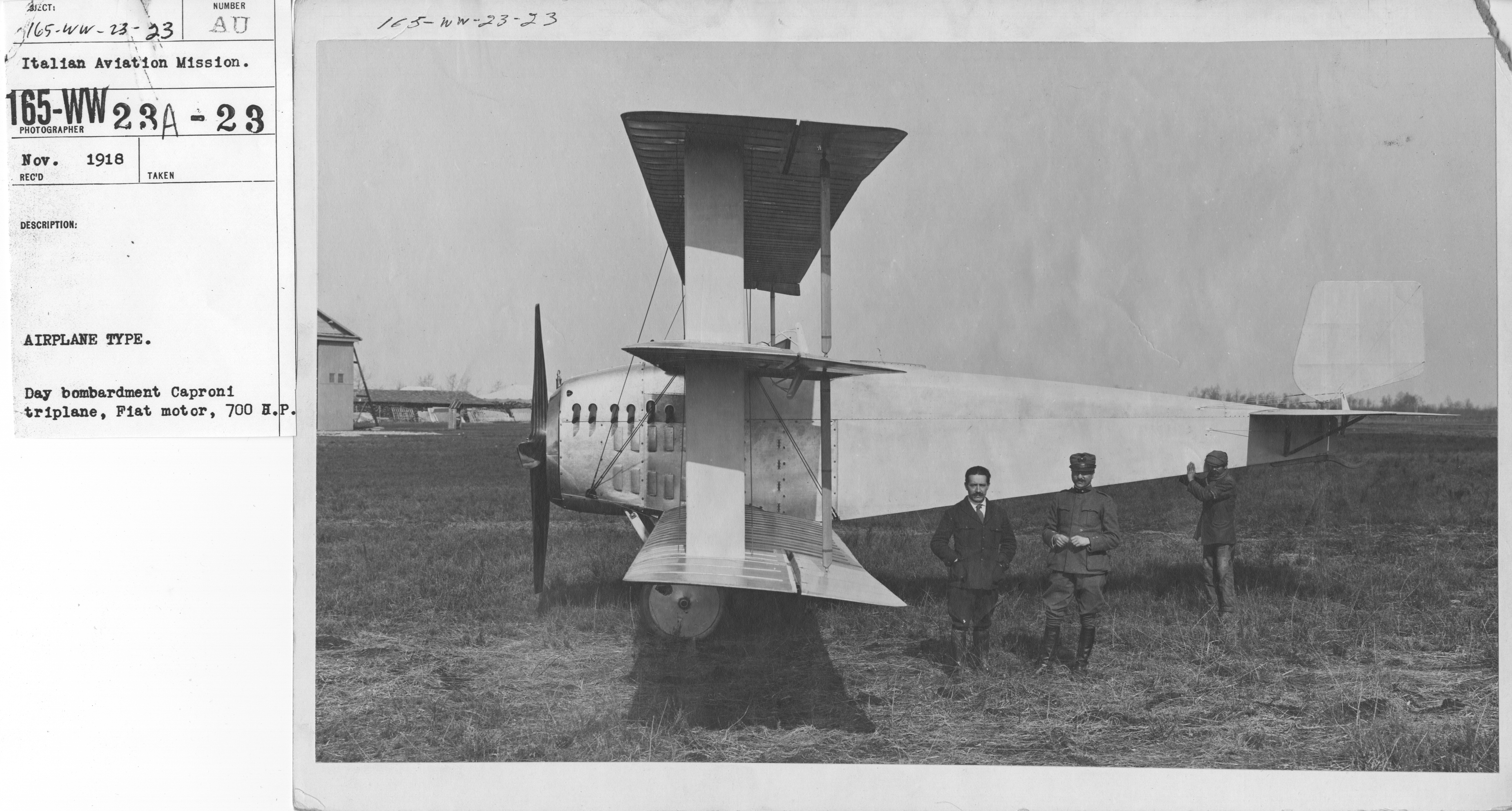

General information
- Type: Light bomber/reconnaissance aircraft
- Manufacturer: Caproni
- Status: prototype only
- Primary user: Italian Army
- Number built: 1

History
- First flight: 1918

The Caproni Ca.53 was an Italian prototype light bomber built in the last months of World War I.

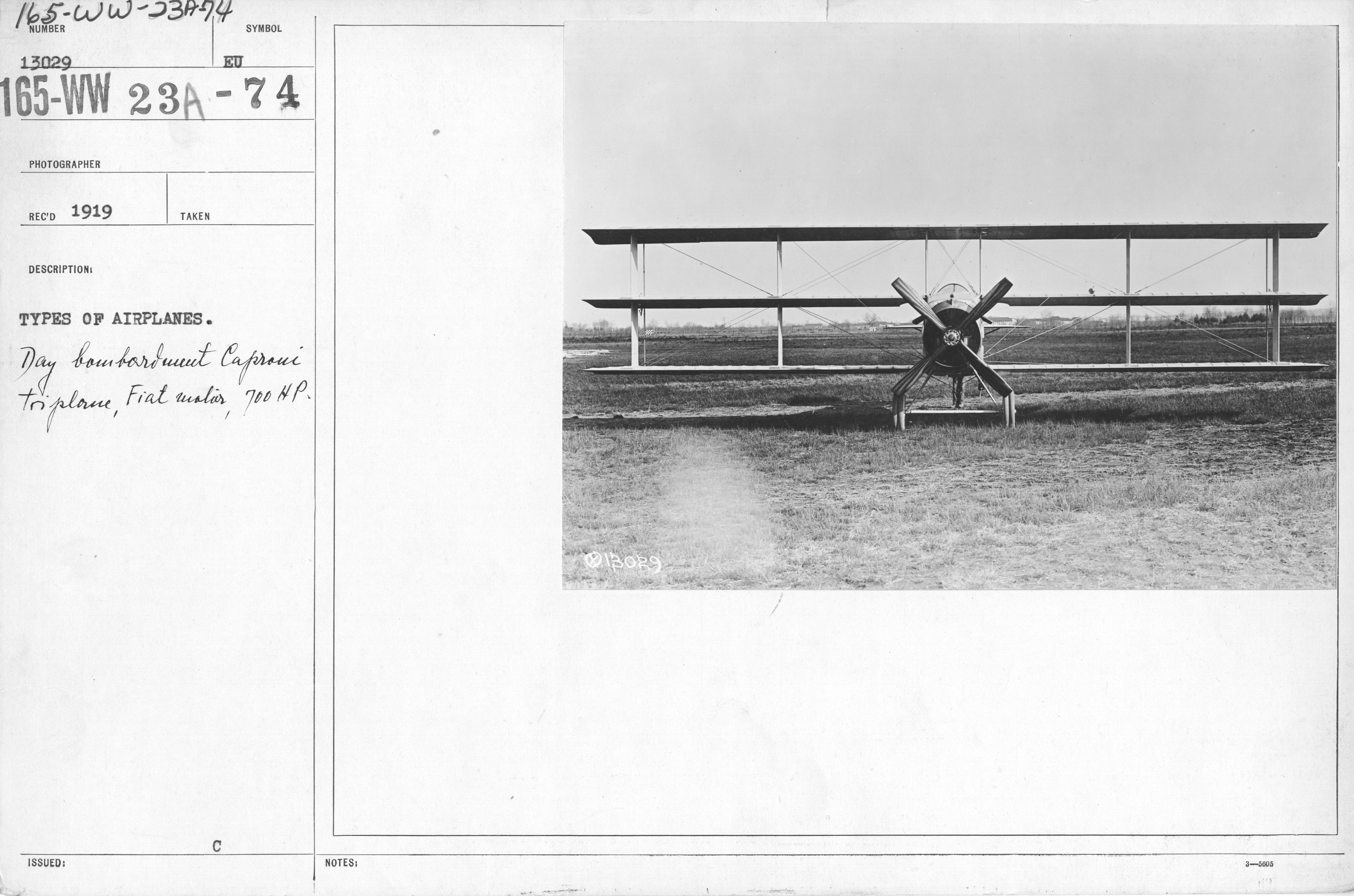
Front view

== Design ==
The Ca.53 was a single-engine, two-seat triplane with triple glazing and fixed undercarriage. The fuselage, of rectangular section, was made of a wooden structure covered with plywood panels and characterized by the presence of two open tandem cabins, the front reserved for the pilot and the rear for the tail gunner, the latter also equipped with a lower ventral position. Integrated into the structure were the compartment and the device to launch bombs. Posteriormente it ended in a classic mono-fletching drift characterized by a single horizontal plane braced by a pair of "V" rods on each side. The upper wing was mounted high parasol, the middle wing was mounted high on the fuselage, and the lower wing was mounted low on the fuselage; all the wings were equipped with ailerons and connected to each other by three uprights on the side integrated with steel cables.

The landing gear was fixed, mounted on a tubular structure underneath the fuselage, equipped with large diameter wheels and a mechanical device that had been lapped and integrated laterally by a support shoe positioned under the tail.

== Development ==
In 1917, the Royal Military Aviation Technical Directorate issued a specification for the supply of a new bombing aircraft capable of carrying a 400 kg war load in bombs at a speed of 200 km/h. Giovanni Battista Caproni responded with a triplane design with a classic, single engine propeller design with wooden structure covered in plywood and treated canvas, characterized by the triple gliding suitable for light bombardment, fast aerial reconnaissance and hunting.

The Ca.53 was completed in 1918 and first flew that same year at the Taliedo airfield. The model, which in its first phase of development was equipped with different engines, aroused the interest of the US and British armed forces. The installation of a more powerful 700 bhp Fiat A.14 engine (515 kW) was also envisaged, with which it was expected to reach a top speed of 240 km/h. However, probably due to the need to give priority the construction of the large bombers and disappointing performance, the Ca.53 did not enter production.

After WW1, Caproni proposed two civilian derivatives of the Ca.53, the four-passenger Ca.54 airliner and the Ca.55 floatplane. However, those projects remained on the drawing board due to the serious downturn in the aviation market after WW1.

== Specifications ==
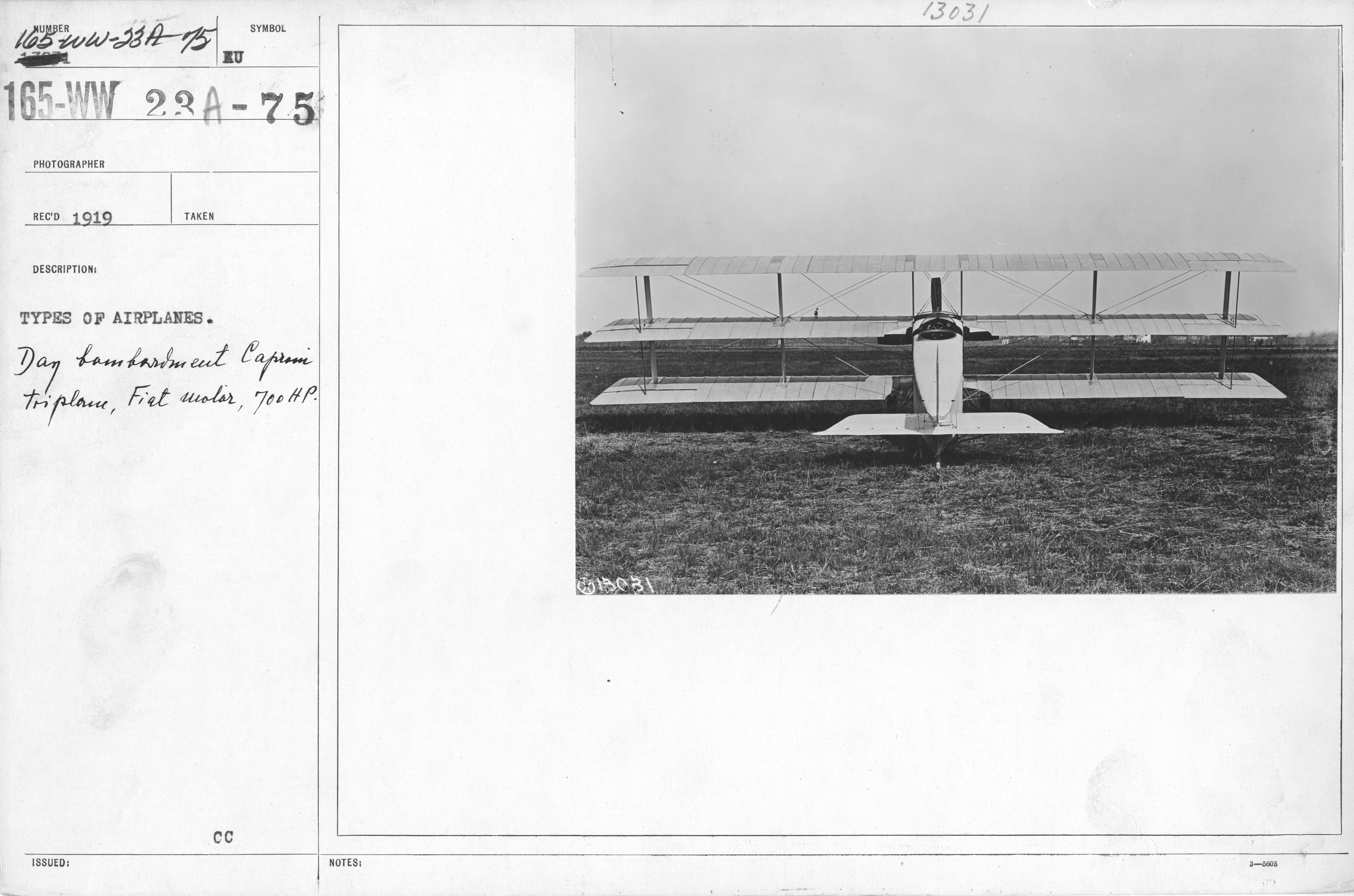
Rear view

Data from , Aerei Italiani 1914-18, Aeroplani Caproni dal 1908 al 1935

General characteristics

- Crew: two
- Length: 9.23 m (30 ft 3 in)
- Wingspan: 14.30 m (46 ft 11 in)
- Height: 3.86 m (12 ft 8 in)
- Wing area: 65 m^{2} (700 sq ft)
- Empty weight: 1,600 kg (3,527 lb)
- Gross weight: 2,400 kg (5,291 lb)
- Powerplant: 1 × Tosi Type FT V-12 water-cooled piston engine, 340 kW (450 hp)

Performance

- Maximum speed: 180 km/h (110 mph, 97 kn)
- Cruise speed: 165 km/h (103 mph, 89 kn)

Armament

- Guns: 2 × 7.7 mm (0.303 in) machine guns, one dorsally mounted and one ventrally mounted.
- Bombs: 400 kg (880 lb) of bombs

== See also ==
Related lists

- List of bomber aircraft
