= Caproni Ca.20 =

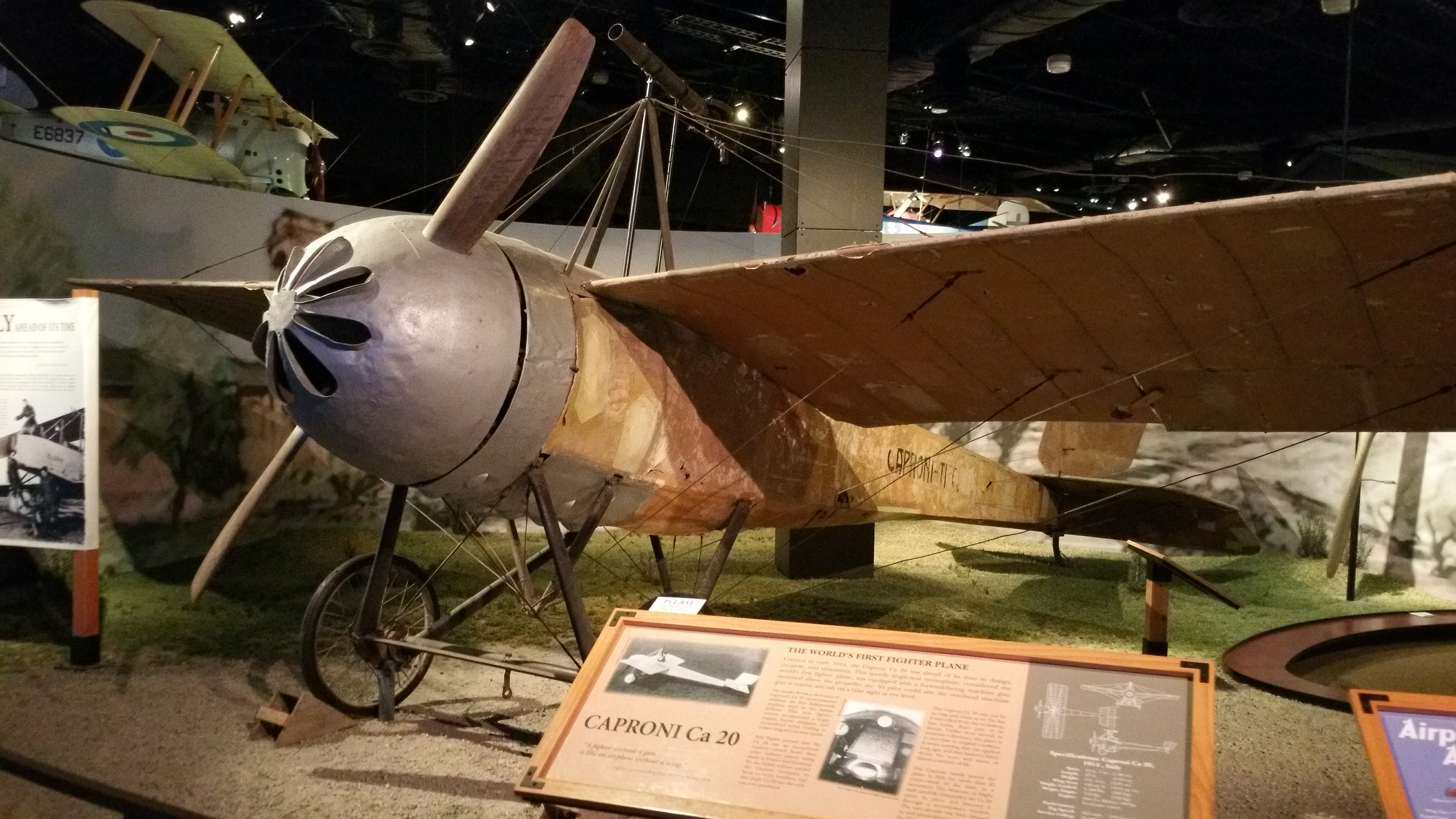

General information
- Type: Fighter aircraft
- Manufacturer: Caproni
- Designer: Giovanni Battista Caproni
- Number built: 1

History
- First flight: 1914

The Caproni Ca.20 was an early monoplane fighter. Developed by Giovanni Battista Caproni in 1914. The only prototype made is today on display at the Museum of Flight in Seattle, Washington, United States.

== History of the design ==
The Ca.20 was derived from the Ca.18, an observation monoplane that had been developed starting in 1913 from the previous models Ca.8 and Ca.16. It used a more powerful engine, the Rhône. It used an unusual rounded nose cover for the wooden propeller which was cowled smoothly to match the fuselage. The cover was pierced to allow cooling of the engine. The improved aerodynamics helped speed and manoeuvrability. Designed as a fighter, a Lewis machine gun was installed above the pilot, placed above the propeller disc, with an eye level sight. The first synchronization devices, which allowed a weapon to shoot with confidence through the blades of a propeller in motion, would not make their appearance until the Fokker Eindecker during 1915, although many experiments had been conducted by the French since 1913.

== History of the prototype ==
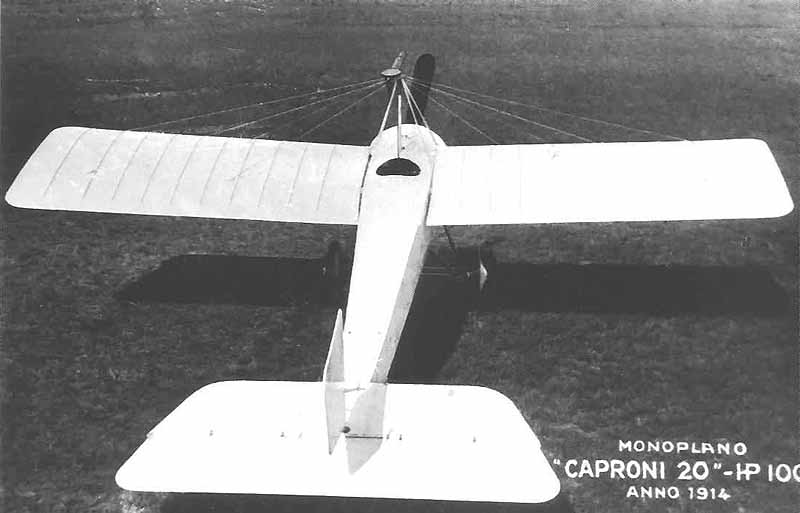

Only a single Caproni Ca.20 was ever built, because the Italian government rejected the design in favor of bomber aircraft. The prototype was stored in a barn on Giovanni Battista Caproni's property for 85 years, before being sold to the Museum of Flight in Seattle in 1999. The dry climate had preserved the aircraft, and with the exception of the tires, which had been gnawed by rodents, the prototype Caproni Ca.20 displayed at the Museum of Flight includes all its original parts.

== Specifications ==
General characteristics

- Crew: 1
- Length: 8.24 m (27 ft 0 in)
- Wingspan: 7.80 m (25 ft 7 in)
- Height: 2.85 m (9 ft 4 in)
- Wing area: 13.0 m^{2} (140 sq ft)
- Empty weight: 350 kg (772 lb)
- Gross weight: 500 kg (1,100 lb)
- Powerplant: 1 × Le Rhône 9-Cylinder , 82 kW (110 hp)

Performance

- Maximum speed: 165 km/h (103 mph, 90 kn)
