= Caproni Ca.9 =

Single-engine monoplane designed and built by Caproni in the early 1910s

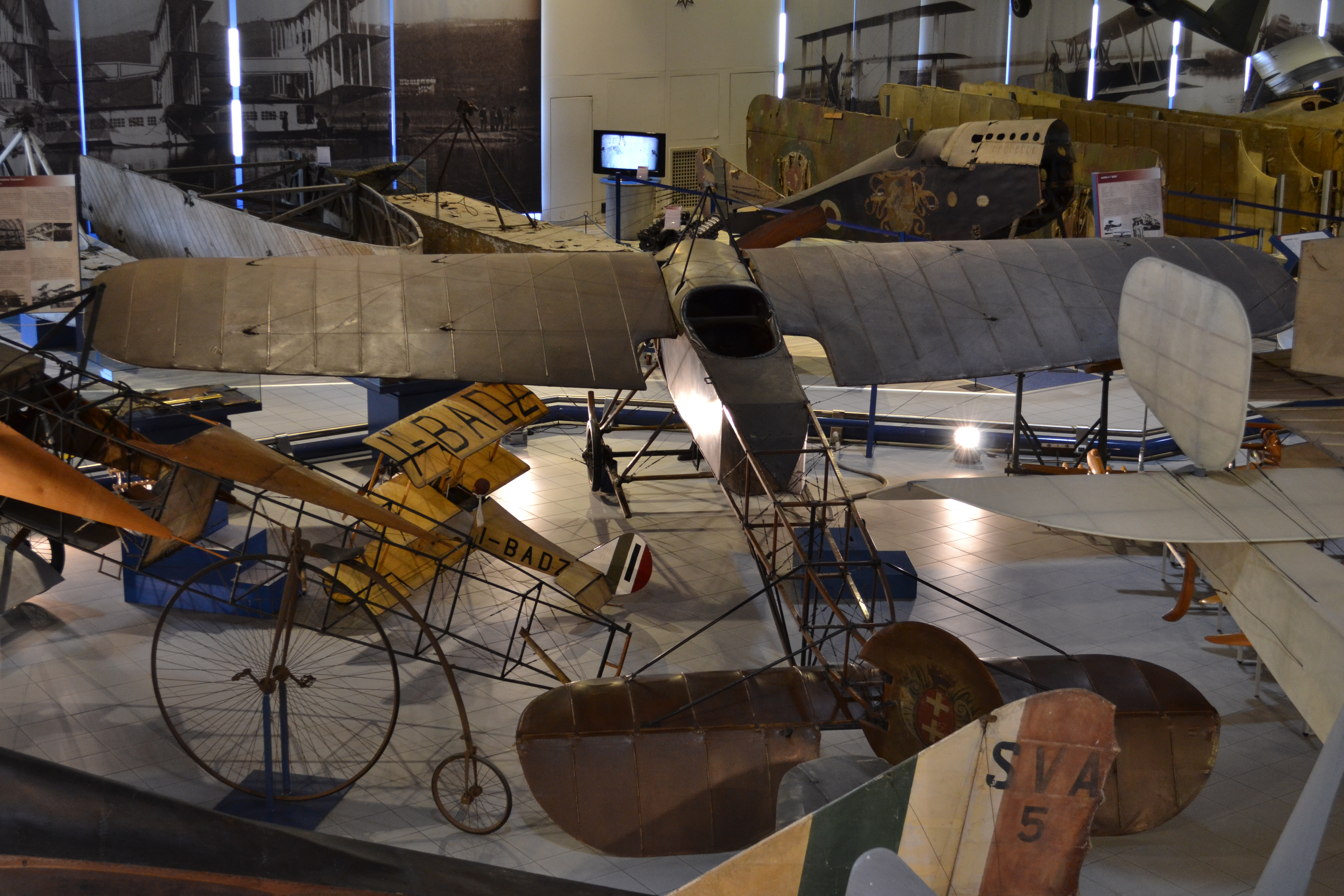
- Caproni Ca.9 on display in the Museo dell'Aeronautica Gianni Caproni at Trento.

General information
- Type: Experimental aircraft
- Manufacturer: Caproni
- Status: Retired
- Number built: 1

History
- First flight: 1911

The Caproni Ca.9 was a single-engine monoplane designed and built by Caproni in the early 1910s.

== Design ==
The Ca.9 was very similar to the Caproni Ca.8 in being a modern high wing monoplane with a wooden structure and canvas covering, equipped with a wing warping system to control roll and reinforced by metal tie rods connected to the fuselage and to a special structure placed above it; the fuselage was based on a wooden lattice structure, in turn reinforced by metal cables, and was covered in cloth only for the front half; the same wooden structure with a canvas covering characterized the empennage.

The fixed undercarriage, was composed of two wheels with curved skids. The engine, which operated a fixed-pitch, two-bladed wooden propeller, was a Y-shaped three-cylinder Anzani capable of developing a power output of 35 hp (26 kW).

== Career ==
Flown for the first time in the summer of 1911, the Ca.9 served at the flying school annexed to the Caproni workshops in Vizzola Ticino; on 20 January 1912, piloted by Enrico Cobioni, an instructor at the Caproni school, the Ca.9 beat the world speed record for aircraft with less than 40 hp (30 kW).

== Specifications ==
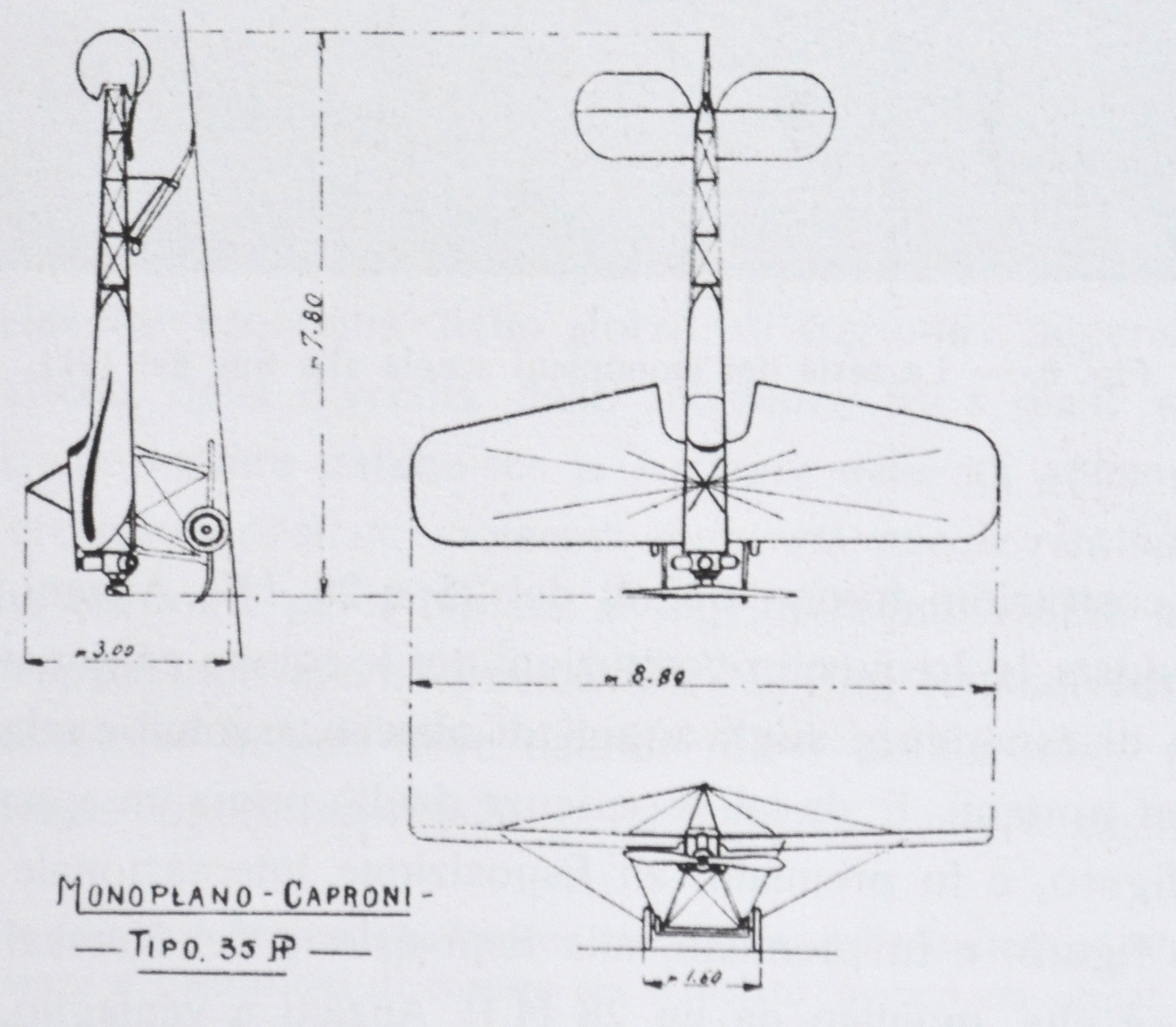
Contemporary 3-view of the Ca.9

Data from Gli aeroplani Caproni – Studi – Progetti – Realizzazioni 1908-1935, Aeroplani Caproni – Gianni Caproni ideatore e costruttore di ali italiane

General characteristics

- Crew: 1
- Length: 7.8 m (25 ft 7 in)
- Wingspan: 8.88 m (29 ft 2 in)
- Height: 3 m (9 ft 10 in)
- Wing area: 16 m^{2} (170 sq ft)
- Empty weight: 220 kg (485 lb)
- Gross weight: 385 kg (849 lb)
- Powerplant: 1 × Anzani 3-cyl air-cooled radial piston engine, 26 kW (35 hp)
- Propellers: 2-bladed wooden fixed-pitch propeller

Performance

- Maximum speed: 90 km/h (56 mph, 49 kn)

== See also ==
- Giovanni Battista Caproni
- Museo dell'Aeronautica Gianni Caproni
