= Caproni Ca.18 =

Ca.18
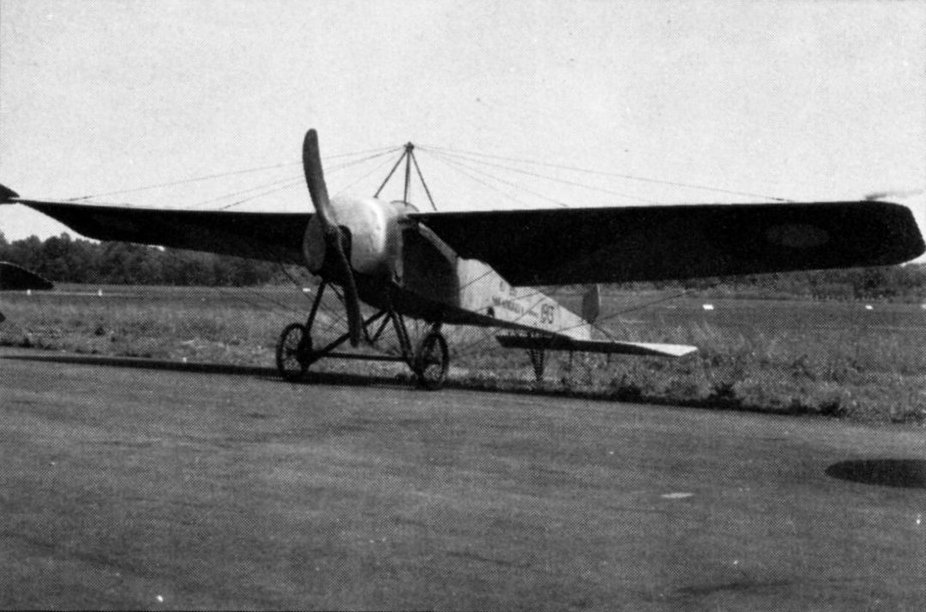

General information
- Type: Reconnaissance aircraft
- Manufacturer: Caproni
- Designer: Gianni Caproni

History
- Introduction date: 1915
- First flight: 1913

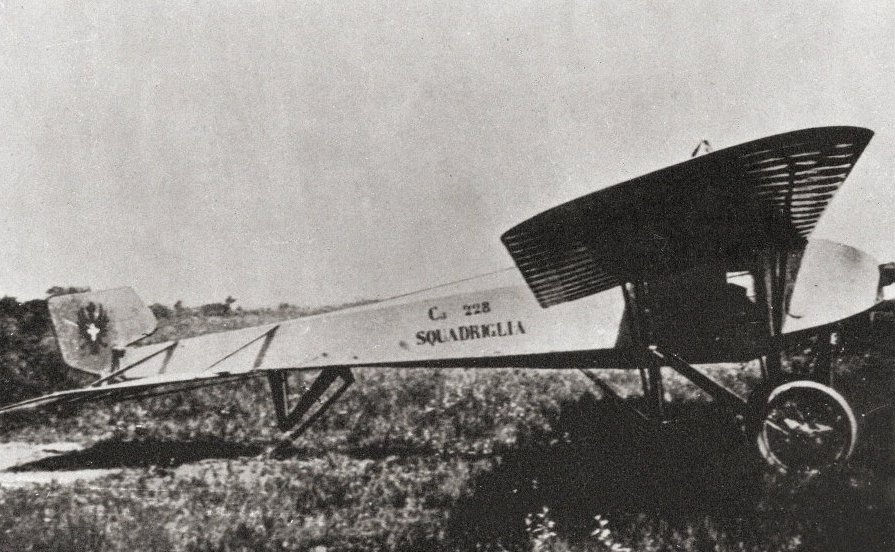
Caproni Ca.18 side view

The Caproni Ca.18 was a military reconnaissance aircraft built in Italy shortly prior to World War I. It became the first Italian-designed and -built aircraft to see service with the Italian armed forces. The Ca.18 was a monoplane of conventional configuration and fixed tailskid undercarriage. The wings were mounted to the fuselage with a bayonet fitting, to facilitate the rapid erection and dismantling of the aircraft.

Originally designed for a government competition in early 1913, no production order for the aircraft was forthcoming until the nationalisation of the Caproni company later in the year, whereupon a small batch was built for the 15th Squadron.

== Operators ==
Kingdom of Italy

- Corpo Aeronautico Militare

== Specifications ==
General characteristics

- Crew: 2, pilot and observer
- Length: 7.67 m (25 ft 2 in)
- Wingspan: 10.92 m (35 ft 10 in)
- Height: 2.90 m (9 ft 6 in)
- Wing area: 22 m^{2} (237 sq ft)
- Empty weight: 400 kg (880 lb)
- Gross weight: 600 kg (1,320 lb)
- Powerplant: 1 × Gnome rotary , 60 kW (80 hp)

Performance

- Maximum speed: 120 km/h (75 mph, 65 kn)
- Endurance: 5 hours
