= Caproni Ca.16 =

1910s Italian aircraft

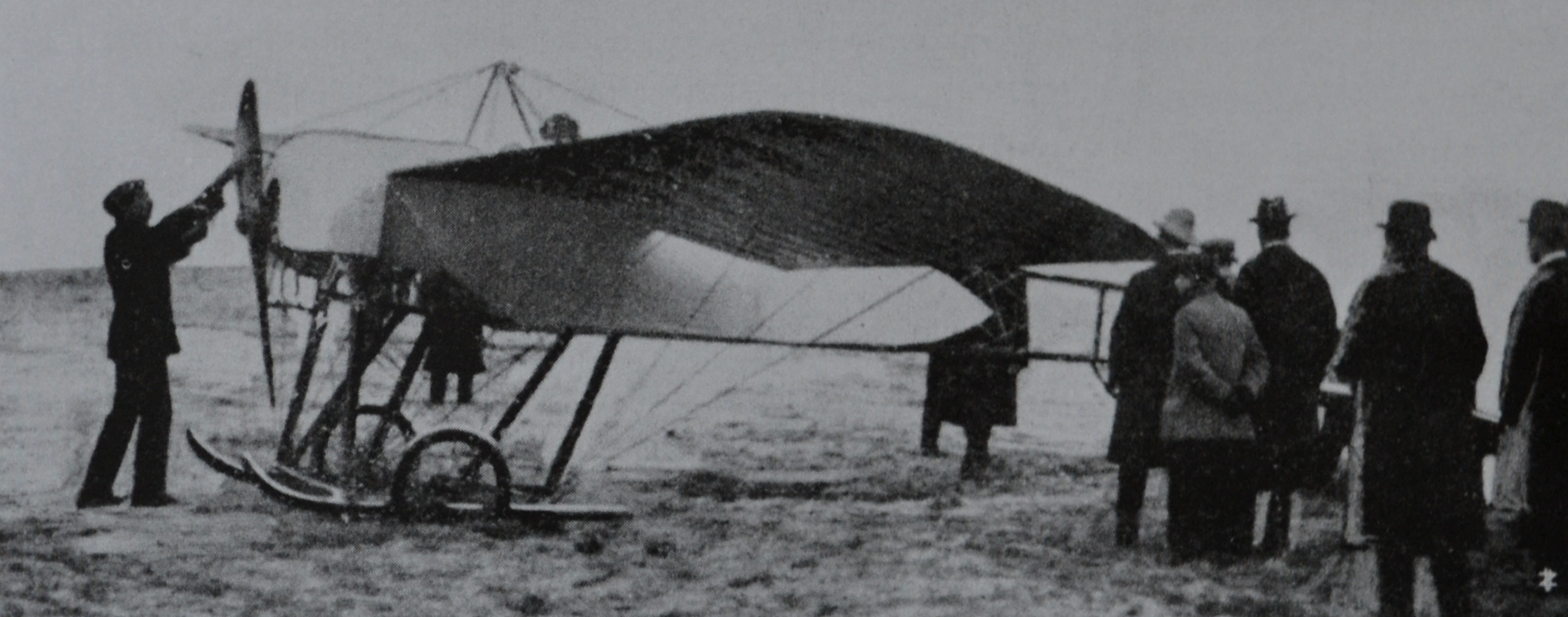
- The Caproni Ca.16 of Slavorossov at Taliedo, near Milan, as he is about to leave for his Milan-Rome flight, 26 February 1913

General information
- Type: Record-breaking aircraft
- Manufacturer: Caproni
- Status: Retired
- Number built: 1

History
- First flight: 1912

The Caproni Ca.16 was a single-engine monoplane designed and built by Caproni in the early 1910s.

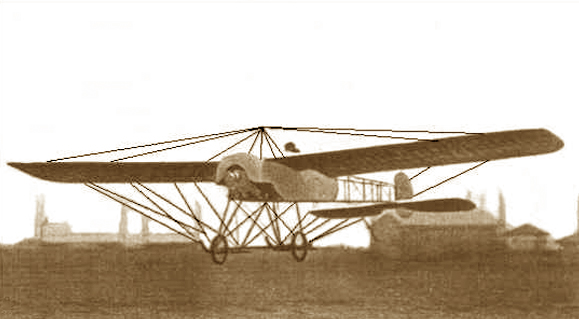
Slavorosoff take off

== Design ==
The Caproni Ca.16 was a single-engine, two seat monoplane with a modern configuration, with a front-mounted propeller. It was derived from the Ca.15, in turn based on the structure – initially derived from that of Blériot XI – that Gianni Caproni had introduced for the first time aboard his airplanes to starting with Ca.8, after the experiments carried out with the series of biplanes from the Ca.1 to the Ca.6Aeroplani Caproni – Gianni Caproni ideatore e costruttore di ali italiane

The Ca.16 was realized in 1912. It presented the two separated and spaced places, as on the Ca.14 (while on Ca.15 they were very close and accessible through a single opening at the top of fuselage). On Ca.16 it was possible for the first pilot to arm or disengage the commands of the second pilot (or passenger).

== Operational use ==
=== Closed-circuit records ===
The operational history of Caproni Ca.16 is largely linked to the figure of the pilot Russian Chariton Nikanorovič Slavorossov. He had presented himself to Vizzola Ticino, where at that time the workshops of Caproni and Faccanoni were located, in January 1913, to buy a propeller for his Blériot. Caproni already knew the skills of this pilot, who had seen flying to Vienna in 1912. He offered him a pilot test place, which Slavorossov accepted. On 24 January, on board a Ca.16, he beat the world record on a closed circuit of 5 km with passenger, covering 200 km in 1 h 56 '30'' and 250 km in 2 h 24' 30''.

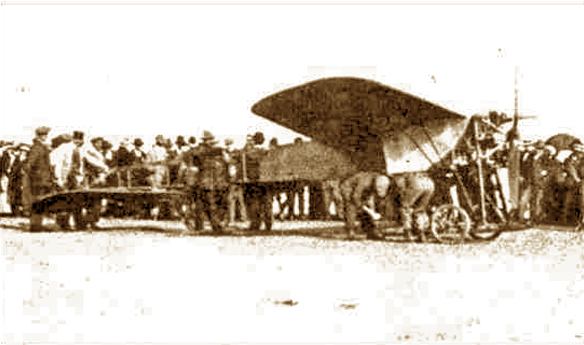
Slavrosoff arrives at Rome.

=== The Milan-Rome raid ===
On 23 February 1913, with the intention (colored in tones patriotic, or even nationalistic) to give an impulse to the Italian aeronautic industry, the vice president of the Italian aviation company Luigi Origoni and the general secretary of the Italian Touring Club and collaborator of the La Gazzetta dello Sport Arturo Mercanti decided to give away a prize for the first flight from Milan to Rome made with an Italian aircraft.

== Specifications ==
3-view

Data from Gli aeroplani Caproni – Studi – Progetti – Realizzazioni 1908–1935

General characteristics

- Crew: 2
- Length: 7.92 m (26 ft 0 in)
- Wingspan: 11.80 m (38 ft 9 in)
- Height: 2.85 m (9 ft 4 in)
- Wing area: 24 m^{2} (260 sq ft)
- Empty weight: 365 kg (805 lb)
- Gross weight: 615 kg (1,356 lb)
- Powerplant: 1 × Gnome 7 Lambda , 59 kW (80 hp)

Performance

- Maximum speed: 110 km/h (68 mph, 59 kn)

== See also ==
- Giovanni Battista Caproni
- Museo dell'Aeronautica Gianni Caproni
