= Caproni Ca.331 =

Italian light bomber/night fighter prototype

Caproni Ca.331 Raffica
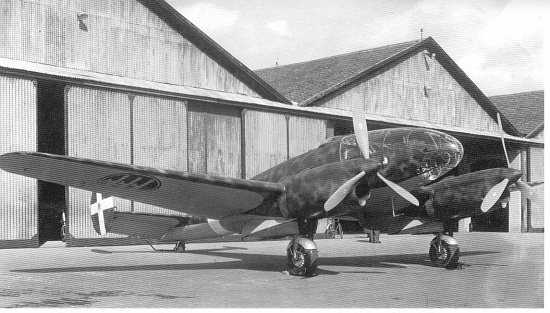
- The first Caproni Vizzola Ca.331, completed as the Ca.331 O.A. (Osservazione Area) reconnaissance aircraft prototype.

General information
- Type: Reconnaissance Aircraft/Bomber/Night Fighter
- National origin: Italy
- Manufacturer: Caproni
- Designer: Ing Cesare Pallavacino
- Primary user: Regia Aeronautica (Italian Royal Air Force)
- Number built: 3

History
- First flight: Ca.331 O.A.: 31 August 1940; Ca331 C.N.: Summer 1942

The Caproni Ca.331 Raffica ("Gust of Wind" or "Fire Burst") was an Italian aircraft built by Caproni in the early 1940s as a tactical reconnaissance aircraft/light bomber and also as a night fighter.

== Development ==
=== Ca.331 O.A. (Ca.331A) ===
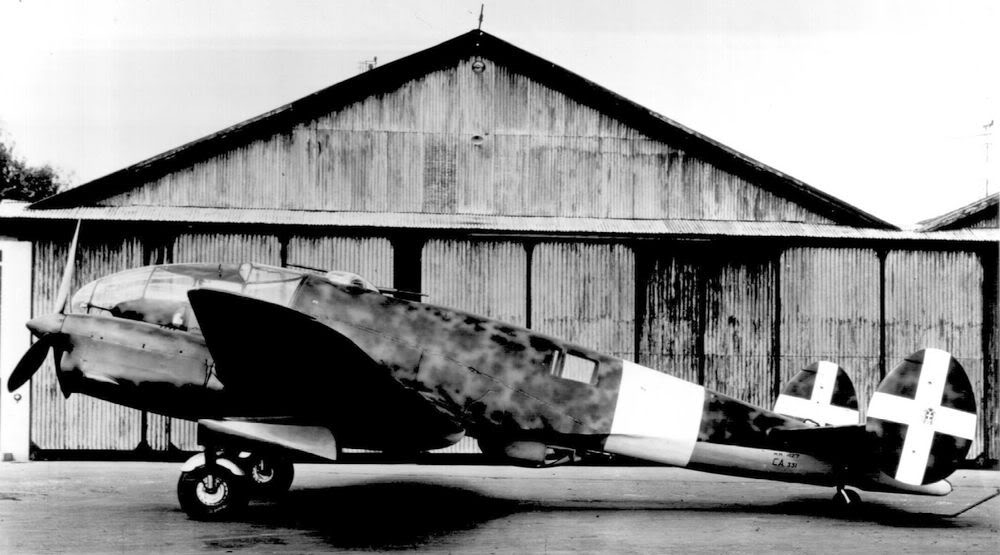
The Caproni Ca.331 O.A. prototype.

In response to a 1938 Italian Air Ministry requirement for a new tactical reconnaissance aircraft with combat capability, Ing Cesare Pallavacino of the Caproni company's Caproni Bergamaschi subsidiary began the design of the Ca.331 O.A. (O.A. standing for Osservazione Area, Italian for "Area Observation"), also designated Ca.331A, in October 1938. It was innovative for Caproni in being of all-metal construction. The Ca.331 O.A. prototype, a twin-engine low-wing monoplane with an unstepped cockpit and glazed nose, had duralumin stressed skin on both its fuselage and wings, and its wings were of an inverted gull-wing configuration. It had two Isotta Fraschini Delta RC.40 engines rated at 574 kilowatts (770 horsepower) each. The aircraft employed a three-man crew of pilot, observer/gunner, and radioman/gunner, and was armed with four 12.7-millimeter (0.5-inch) Breda-SAFAT machine guns—two of them in fixed mounts in the wing roots firing forward, one in a dorsal turret, and one in a ventral mount. The Ca.331 O.A. also had a bomb bay capable of carrying up to 1,000 kilograms (2,205 pounds) of bombs and four external bomb racks under its wings.

The Ca.331 O.A. prototype first flew on 31 August 1940, at Ponte San Pietro with Caproni test pilot Ettore Wengi at the controls. Its original Piaggio propellers proved inadequate, but their replacement with Alfa Romeo-built propellers in 1941 resulted in the aircraft having improved performance which, in fact, exceeded expectations. In 1941, Caproni Bergamaschi delivered the prototype to the Regia Aeronautica (Italian Royal Air Force), which began official tests at Guidonia Montecelio with good results. However, the Regia Aeronautica handed the aircraft back to Caproni Bergamaschi without a production order. The German Air Force (Luftwaffe) then requested control of the aircraft for trials at its test center at Rechlin in Germany. Although the Luftwaffe was impressed with the aircraft—probably more so than the Italians—no German order for it resulted.

The Ca.331 O.A. won widespread praise from both the Italian and German pilots—including German fighter ace Werner Mölders (1913–1941) -- who tested it, and the chief of the German Luftwaffe, Hermann Göring (1893–1946), was given a demonstration of its capabilities at Guidonia Montecelio in January 1942. The reasons for the lack of a production order by either Italy or Germany remain obscure and a matter of debate. Reasons given by various sources include a supposed overreliance on the use of materials in the Ca.331's construction that may have been in scarce supply (although this itself is controversial) in wartime Italy and Germany; the use of too many parts in the Ca.331, uncommon with other Italian aircraft (although it is not clear what specifically these may have been); political problems that Caproni company founder Gianni Caproni (1886–1957) may have had with the Italian Fascist government (which have not been identified clearly); an unwillingness of the Italian military to cooperate too closely with their German counterparts for fear of being dominated by Germany in the event of a German victory in World War II; or simply that the Ca.331 was under development for so long that the requirement for it disappeared before it could enter production, a common problem in the Italian aircraft industry during the World War II years. The sole Ca.331 O.A. prototype was at the Caproni company airfield at Taliedo at the time the Italian armistice with the Allies took effect on 8 September 1943. Seized by German forces, it was disassembled, shipped to Germany, and later scrapped.

=== Ca.331 C.N. (Ca.331B) ===
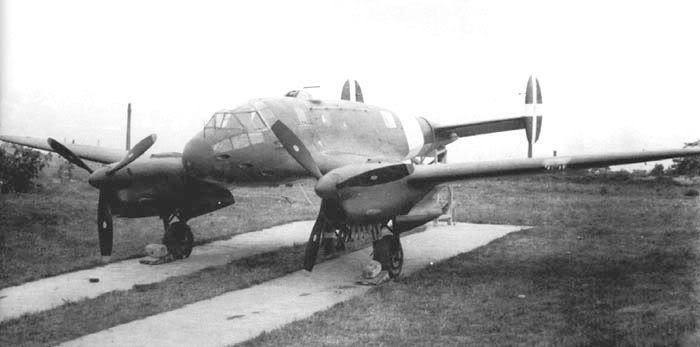
The second Caproni Ca.331 prototype. Ordered as a second Ca.331 O.A. reconnaissance aircraft prototype, it was completed instead as the first prototype of the Ca.331 C.N. night fighter as seen here, probably during weapons testing at the Furbara firing range.

By 1942, the war situation had changed to the point where Italy perceived a greater need for air defense capabilities. Accordingly, in May 1942 the Italian Air Ministry ordered the second Ca.331 prototype, originally planned as a second Ca.331 O.A., to be completed instead as the first prototype of a night fighter version of the aircraft. The night fighter prototype was designated Ca.331 C.N., with "C.N." standing for Caccia Notturna, Italian for "Night Fighter" it also was known as the Ca.331B.

The Ca.331 C.N., which first flew in the summer of 1942, differed from the Ca.331 O.A. in having a stepped cockpit and less nose glazing. Its armament was installed in the spring of 1943 and consisted of four fixed forward-firing 20-millimeter Mauser MG 151 cannon and four 12.7-millimeter (0.5-inch) Breda-SAFAT machine guns—two of them forward-firing and fixed, one in a dorsal turret, and one in a ventral mount. Its original 596-kilowatt (800-horsepower) 12-cylinder air-cooled Isotta Fraschini Delta IV engines were replaced by the spring of 1943 with 633-kilowatt (850-horsepower) versions of the Delta IV with two-stage superchargers. Like the Ca.331 O.A. prototype, it was at the Caproni company airfield at Taliedo when the Italian armistice with the Allies took effect on 8 September 1943, and it suffered the same fate: The Germans seized it there, disassembled it and shipped it to Germany.

A second Ca.331 C.N. prototype was constructed, differing from the first in having an armament of two 20-millimeter Ikaria cannon and four 12.7-millimeter Breda-SAFAT machine guns, all mounted in the nose. It was still being assembled when Italy surrendered to the Allies on 8 September 1943, was seized by the Germans and shipped to Germany, destined never to fly.

Various modifications were proposed for production models of the Ca.331 C.N. Engines proposed for production models included the German 1,099-kilowatt (1,475-horsepower) Daimler-Benz DB 605, the Italian 931-kilowatt (1,250-horsepower) Isotta Fraschini Zeta R.C.42, and the Fiat RA-1050 RC.58 Tifone (Italian for "Typhoon"), an Italian copy of the DB 605 expected to give the Ca.331 C.N. a top speed of 644 kilometers (400 mi) per hour. Italian authorities also made various aggressive plans for production of Ca.331 C.N. aircraft, with as many as 100 built by May 1942 toward an eventual total production run of 1,000 aircraft. However, all production plans were cancelled in January 1943.

=== Other variants ===
Germany considered building a dual-control combat trainer version of the Ca.331 to be designated the Ca.331G. Nothing came of the proposal. An anti-tank version mounting a 37-millimeter cannon also was proposed, but none were built.

== Operators ==
Kingdom of Italy

- Regia Aeronautica for evaluation only.

Germany

- Luftwaffe

== Variants ==
Caproni Ca.331 O.A. (or Caproni Ca.331A)
Tactical reconnaissance aircraft/light bomber prototype (one built)
Caproni Ca.331 C.N. (or Caproni Ca.331B)
Night fighter prototype (two built)
Caproni Ca.331G
Proposed German dual-control combat trainer (none built)
Caproni Ca.333
Proposed floatplane version

== Specifications (Ca.331 C.N.) ==
Data from Italian Civil & Military Aircraft 1930-1945

General characteristics

- Crew: three
- Length: 11.75 m (38 ft 6 1/2 in)
- Wingspan: 16.40 m (53 ft 9 3/4 in)
- Height: 3.21 m (10 ft 6 1/4 in)
- Wing area: 38.50 m^{2} (414.4 sq ft)
- Empty weight: 4,600 kg (10,140 lb)
- Gross weight: 6,800 kg (14,992 lb)
- Powerplant: 2 × Isotta Fraschini Delta IV piston inverted air-cooled V-12 piston engine, 630 kW (840 hp) each

Performance

- Maximum speed: 505 km/h (314 mph, 273 kn) at 5,300 m (17,400 ft)
- Cruise speed: 450 km/h (280 mph, 240 kn)
- Range: 1,600 km (994 mi, 864 nmi)
- Service ceiling: 8,090 m (26,550 ft)
- Time to altitude: 6,000 m (19,680 ft) in 9 minutes 35 seconds

Armament

- Guns:

6 x 12.7 mm (0.5 in) Breda-SAFAT machine guns in the stepped "solid" nose.
2 x 12.7 mm (0.5 in) Breda-SAFAT machine guns machine guns in dorsal and ventral defensive positions.

or

2 x 12.7 mm (0.5 in) Breda-SAFAT machine guns machine guns and 4 x 20 mm (0.8 in) Mauser cannon.

or

6 x 20 mm (0.8 in) Ikaria cannon in a ventral bulge.

- Hardpoints: 2 , with provisions to carry combinations of:
  - Bombs: 2 x 100 kg (220 lb)
  - Other: 2 x underwing tanks
- Bombs:

(In the bomb bay)

1,000 kg (2,205 lb) of small bombs.
