= CA 90 =

CA90 may refer to:

- California State Route 90, a highway in the US state of California
- Caproni Ca.90, an experimental aircraft
