= Caproni Ca.316 =

Ca.316
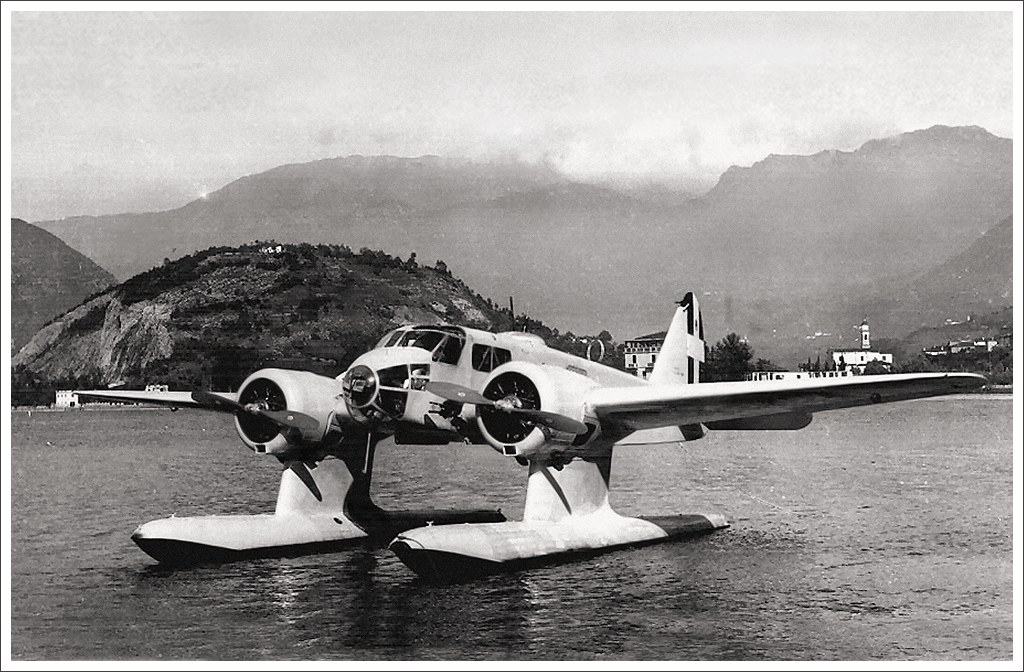

General information
- Type: Reconnaissance floatplane
- Manufacturer: Caproni
- Number built: 14

History
- First flight: 14 August 1940
- Developed from: Caproni Ca.310

The Caproni Ca.316 was a reconnaissance seaplane produced in Italy during World War II, intended for catapult operations from Italian Navy capital ships. It was a member of the large family of Caproni designs derived from the Ca.306 airliner prototype of 1935, and more directly a modification of the Ca.310 Idro seaplane.

The basic Ca.310 design was modified with the attachment of large pontoons carried underneath the engine nacelles on streamlined pylons, and a revised nose with extensive glazing on the ventral surface.

14 examples were built, assigned in 1942 to the 3a Squadriglia of the Scuola Osservazione Marittima.

== Specifications ==
General characteristics

- Crew: three
- Length: 12.89 m (42 ft 3 in)
- Wingspan: 15.90 m (52 ft 1 in)
- Height: 5.44 m (16 ft 9 in)
- Wing area: 38.0 m^{2} (409 sq ft)
- Empty weight: 3,360 kg (8,820 lb)
- Gross weight: 4,804 kg (10,590 lb)
- Powerplant: 2 × Piaggio P.VII radial engine , 460 kW (616 hp) each

Performance

- Maximum speed: 331 km/h (205 mph, 178 kn)
- Range: 1,600 km (1,000 mi, 870 nmi)
- Service ceiling: 5,850 m (19,680 ft)

Armament

  - 1 × 7.7 mm (0.303 in) forward Scotti-I.F. machine gun.
  - 1 × 7.7 mm (0.303 in) dorsal Scotti-I.F. machine gun.
