= Caproni Ca.4 =

Italian heavy bomber of World War I

Ca.4
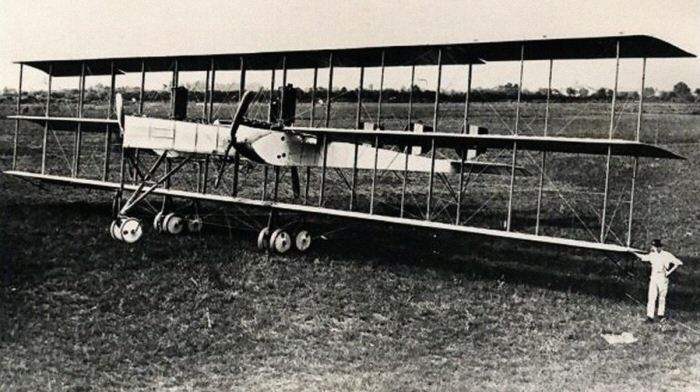
- Caproni Ca.40 heavy bomber prototype

General information
- Type: Heavy bomber; later variants included airliners
- Manufacturer: Caproni
- Status: Retired
- Primary users: Italian Army United Kingdom (Royal Naval Air Service); United States
- Number built: 44 to 53

History
- Introduction date: 1918
- First flight: 1917

The Caproni Ca.4 was an Italian heavy bomber of the World War I era.

== Development ==
After designing the successful Ca.3, Gianni Caproni of the Caproni works designed a much bigger aircraft. It shared the unusual layout of the Caproni Ca.3, being a twin-boom aircraft with one pusher engine at the rear of a central nacelle and two tractor engines in front of twin booms, providing a push-pull configuration. The twin booms carried a single elevator and three fins. The main landing gear was fixed and consisted of two sets of four wheels each.

The huge new bomber was accepted by the Italian Army under the military designation Ca.4, but it was produced in several variants, differing in factory designations.

== Description ==
The Ca.4 was a three-engine, twin-fuselage triplane of wooden construction with a fabric-covered frame. An open central nacelle was attached to the undersurface of the center wing. It contained a single pusher engine, pilot, and forward gunner. The remaining engines were tractor mounted at the front of each fuselage. At least one variation of the central nacelle seated the crew in a two-seat tandem format with the forward position for a gunner/pilot and the rear position for the pilot. Others used a forward gunner with side-by-side pilot positions to the rear of the gunner. Two rear gunners were positioned, one in each boom behind the center wing. An engineer or second pilot could also be accommodated there.

Armament consisted of four (but up to eight) Revelli 6.5 mm or 7.7 mm machine guns in front ring mounts and two boom ring mounts. Bombs were suspended in a bomb bay, which was a long and narrow container fixed to a lower wing. Photographs show at least four different arrangements with regard to the bombing nacelle.

1. No nacelle - presumably not a combat configuration.
2. A tall, narrow nacelle that housed approximately 12 internal bombs vertically and another 18–20 strapped to the outside.
3. A shorter nacelle that may have been the lower half of the tall nacelle but with no external bombs.
4. No nacelle but with a single long bomb/torpedo slung under the bottom wing.

== Variants ==
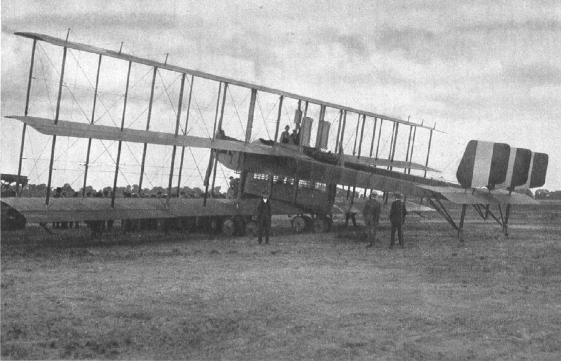
The Ca.48 airliner

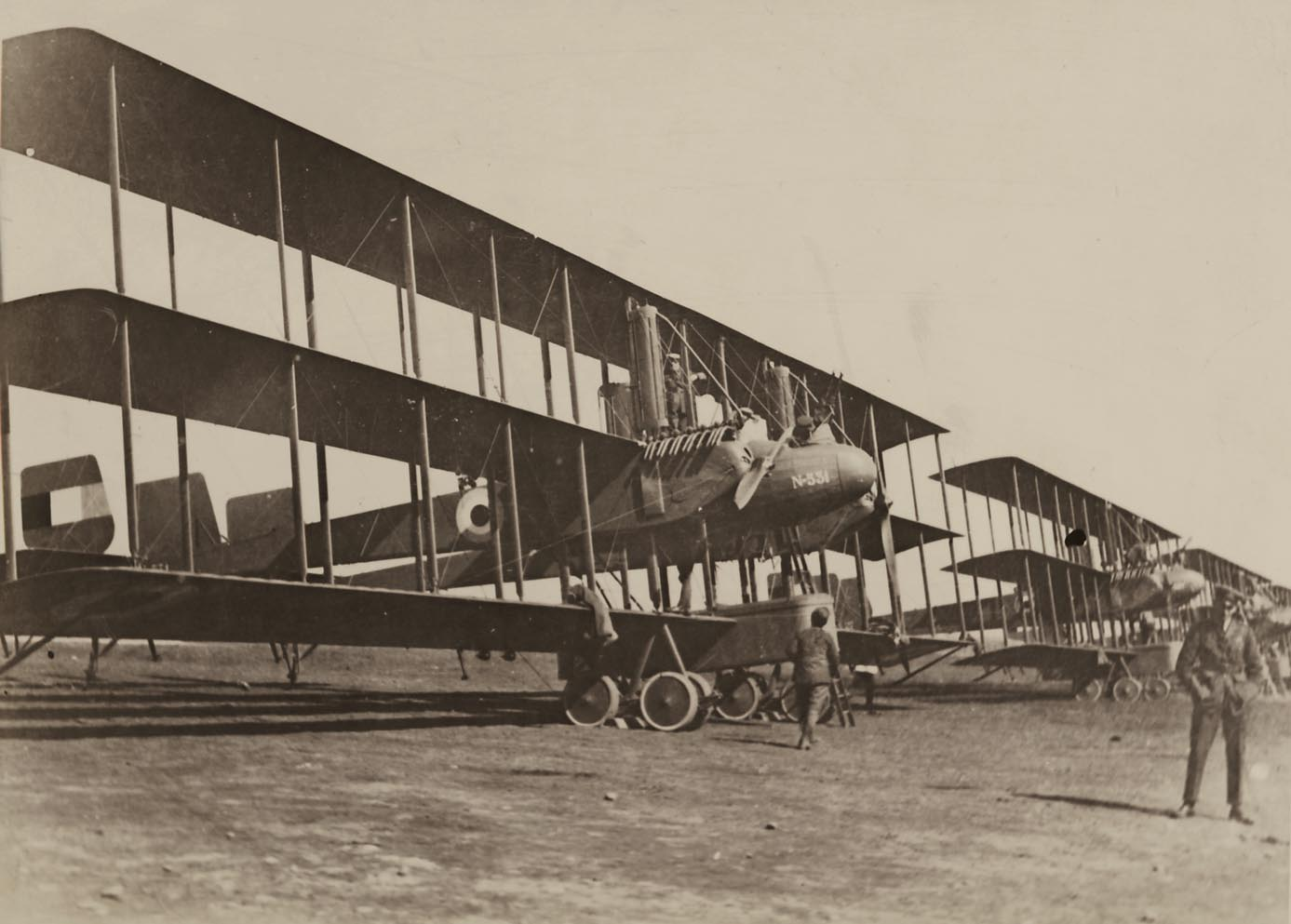
The Ca.52 (Caproni Ca.42) - second production series of Ca.4-Ca.40 family - Aircraft of N°227 Squadron Royal Naval Air Service

Note: during the war, all these aircraft were designated Ca.4 by the Italian Army. At the time, Caproni referred to the various designs by the total power of their engines. After the war, Caproni devised a new designation scheme for their own designs—these are used below.

- Caproni Ca.40 - single prototype.
- Caproni Ca.41 - production variant, essentially similar to the prototype and powered by three Fiat A.12 inline engines of 210 kW (280 hp). A few Ca.41s were powered by 186 kW (249 hp) Isotta Fraschini engines instead. These were referred to internally by Caproni as the Caproni 750 hp. A total of 41 were built.
- Caproni Ca.42 - powered by 298 kW (400 hp) Liberty V-12 engines and known internally as the Caproni 1,200 hp. 12 built.
- Caproni Ca.43 - single example of a floatplane variant.
- Caproni Ca.48 - Airliners converted from Ca.42s after World War I; the Ca.48 first flew in 1919. The double-deck passenger cabin mounted between the booms seated a total of 23 passengers who entered via the nose nacelle; 16 of them sat in the lower cabin on long benches alongside its walls with large windows providing them with good views, and the other seven passengers sat on an upper deck, as did the pilots. The Ca.48 was powered by three 298 kW (400 hp) Liberty L-12 engines. Although it is unlikely that the Ca.48 ever entered airline service, a Ca.48 did visit the First Aviation Exhibition Amsterdam of August–September 1919, where it was very popular with visitors, among whom was Prince Hendrick (1876–1934), Prince Consort of the Netherlands (1901–1934).
- Caproni Ca.51 - single example of a considerably enlarged design with biplane tail and tail barbette. Three × 522 kW (700 hp) Fiat A.14 engines.
- Caproni Ca.52 - Ca.42s built for the RNAS. Six built.
- Caproni Ca.58 / Caproni Cinquemotore A variant of the Ca 48 airliner was built powered by five 186 kW (249 hp) engines, the outer engines in pusher nacelles.
- Caproni Ca.59 - as for the Ca.58, but this designation used for customers outside Italy.

Production figures differ in publications. The most likely number is 38 of all Ca.4 variants (other quoted figures are: 38 of Ca.40 and Ca.41 and 6 Ca.42 or 32 Ca.42 and 21 of other variants). Numerous publications incorrectly refer to all variants as the Ca.42.

== Operational history ==
Ca.4s were tested by the Italian Air Force in 1917 and began operations in 1918. They were used for attacking targets in Austria-Hungary. In April 1918, six Ca.42s were issued to the British RNAS (No. 227 Sqn) but were never used operationally and were returned to Italy after the war. At least three CA.42s were sent to the United States for evaluation. After the war, the Ca. 4 was replaced in Italy by the Ca.36.

Despite its unstable and fragile appearance, the Ca.4 was well designed. Its size, without regard to its height, was not any larger than that of other foreign heavy bombers. With Liberty engines, it had a fast speed, similar to other heavy bombers, while its bombload had one of the largest capacities of that era, surpassed only by that of the Imperial German Zeppelin-Staaken R.VI. If it had been flown with other engines, its performance would have suffered.

On 2 August 1919, after its wings apparently collapsed in mid-flight at an altitude of 3,000 feet (910 meters), a Ca.48 airliner crashed at Verona, Italy, during a flight from Venice to Taliedo, Milan. All on board died. (Note: The casualties were variously reported as 14, 15, and 17) It was Italy's first commercial aviation disaster and one of the earliest heavier-than-air airliner disasters.

== Operators ==
Kingdom of Italy

- Corpo Aeronautico Militare

United Kingdom

- Royal Naval Air Service

United States

- United States Army Air Service

== Specifications (Ca.42) ==
General characteristics

- Crew: four (pilot, co-pilot, front gunner, and rear gunner/mechanic)
- Length: 13.1 m (43 ft 0 in)
- Wingspan: 29.9 m (98 ft 1 in)
- Height: 6.3 m (20 ft 8 in)
- Wing area: 200 m^{2} (2,200 sq ft)
- Empty weight: 6,709 kg (14,791 lb)
- Max takeoff weight: 7,500 kg (16,535 lb)
- Powerplant: 3 × Liberty L-12 V-12 water-cooled piston engines, 298 kW (400 hp) each

Performance

- Maximum speed: 140 km/h (87 mph, 76 kn)
- Range: 700 km (430 mi, 380 nmi)
- Service ceiling: 3,000 m (9,800 ft)
- Rate of climb: 2.083 m/s (410.0 ft/min)

Armament

- Guns: 4 × 6.5 mm FIAT-Revelli machine guns, two in forward mounting and one in each of two rearward positions.
- Bombs: 1,450 kg (3,200 lb) of bombs

== See also ==
Related lists

- List of bomber aircraft
- List of World War I Entente aircraft
