= CA-22 =

CA-22 may refer to:

- California State Route 22, a highway in the U.S. state of California
- California's 22nd congressional district, a congressional district in California
- Caproni Ca.22, an experimental monoplane
