= Caproni Ca.91 =

1930s proposed Italian flying boat

Caproni Ca 91

General information
- Type: Flying boat
- National origin: Italy
- Manufacturer: Caproni
- Status: project only

History
- Developed from: Caproni Ca.90

The Caproni Ca.91 was a proposed Italian flying boat designed by Caproni.

== Design and development ==
Like the Caproni Ca.90, the Ca.91 had three tandem pairs of 1,000 hp (746 kW) Isotta Fraschini Asso 1000 W-18 inline piston engines, but all three pairs were mounted on the lower wing.

== Specifications ==
Data from

General characteristics

- Crew: 7
- Length: 31.30 m (102 ft 8 in)
- Upper wingspan: 34.90 m (114 ft 6 in)
- Lower wingspan: 46.60 m (152 ft 11 in)
- Height: 9.80 m (32 ft 2 in)
- Wing area: 500 m^{2} (5,400 sq ft)
- Empty weight: 13,000 kg (28,660 lb)
- Gross weight: 17,000 kg (37,479 lb)
- Max takeoff weight: 30,000 kg (66,139 lb)
- Powerplant: 6 × Isotta Fraschini Asso 1000 W-18 water-cooled inline piston engines, 750 kW (1,000 hp) each

Performance

- Maximum speed: 200 km/h (120 mph, 110 kn)
- Endurance: 7 hours
- Service ceiling: 4,000 m (13,000 ft)
