= Caproni Sauro-1 =

Sauro-1
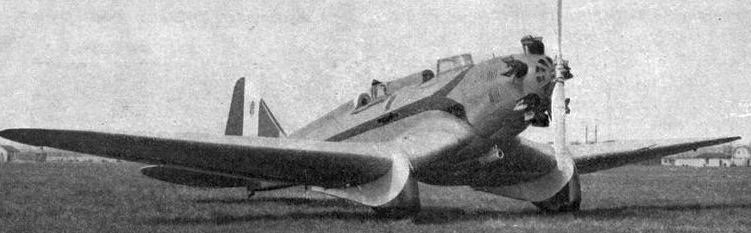

General information
- Type: Two seat touring aircraft
- National origin: Italy
- Manufacturer: Società Italiana Caproni
- Designer: Emmanuale Trigona
- Number built: 1

History
- First flight: 1933

The Caproni Sauro-1 (English: Sorrel), or Caproni Tricap, was a light, single-engine cantilever monoplane, seating two in tandem, built in Italy in the early 1930s for touring. Despite good performance and favourable test reports, only one was built.

== Design and development ==
The Caproni Sauro-1 was not a Caproni design, but was built by them to a design from Emmanuele Trigona, leading to the alternative name Tricap (Trigone Caproni). It was an aerodynamically clean cantilever monoplane with a low inverted gull wing. The wing was thick with a wide chord at the root, tapering both in plan and in thickness along the span to rounded wing tips. Structurally the Sauro was a mixture of wood and chrome steel frames, covered with plywood and fabric. On the wings the plywood was stress bearing. Camber changing gear linked the neutral position of the ailerons and the angle of incidence of the tailplane; the ailerons maintained their normal opposing deflections for lateral control. The fixed, conventional undercarriage took advantage of the inverted gull wing by placing the main legs at the lowest points of the wings, keeping the legs short and the track wide. Shallow, full chord fairings enclosed the legs and part of the mainwheels, which had rubber shock absorbers and brakes.

The Sauro was powered by a 97 kW (130 hp) Farina T-58 radial engine within a domed cowling that left its five cylinders individually exposed. Behind the engine the fuselage was ovoidal in cross-section and tapered only slowly to the tail. It had a chrome steel frame, covered with plywood and fabric. The two tandem cockpits, the forward one over the wing and the other just behind its trailing edge, had long headrest deckings behind them that extended to the tail. The cockpits were equipped with dual controls; those of the forward position could be disconnected in flight. Both seats had room for a parachute. The tail surfaces were conventional, steel-framed and covered with a mixture of aluminium and fabric, with the tapered tailplane set at mid-fuselage with an angular fin and rudder above. The rudder ended above the fuselage, angled to allow for elevator movement. A steel shod, rubber-sprung tailskid was mounted at the end of the fuselage.

The Sauro was built at Caproni's main Taliedo works, then tested at Guidonia Montecelio under military markings. The aircraft was judged a success, with good performance and handling, but there was no development or production. Trigona carried over some features of the Sauro into a fighter design but this was abandoned in 1943.

== Specifications ==
Data from Italian Civil and Military Aircraft 1930-1945

General characteristics

- Crew: two
- Length: 5.82 m (19 ft 1 in)
- Wingspan: 11.40 m (37 ft 5 in)
- Height: 2.21 m (7 ft 3 in)
- Empty weight: 480 kg (1,058 lb)
- Gross weight: 840 kg (1,852 lb)
- Powerplant: 1 × Farina T-58 5-cylinder radial, 97 kW (130 hp)
- Propellers: 2-bladed duralumin, adjustable pitch

Performance

- Maximum speed: 230 km/h (140 mph, 120 kn)
- Endurance: 6 hr
- Service ceiling: 6,000 m (20,000 ft)
