= Caproni Ca.8 =

1910s Italian aircraft

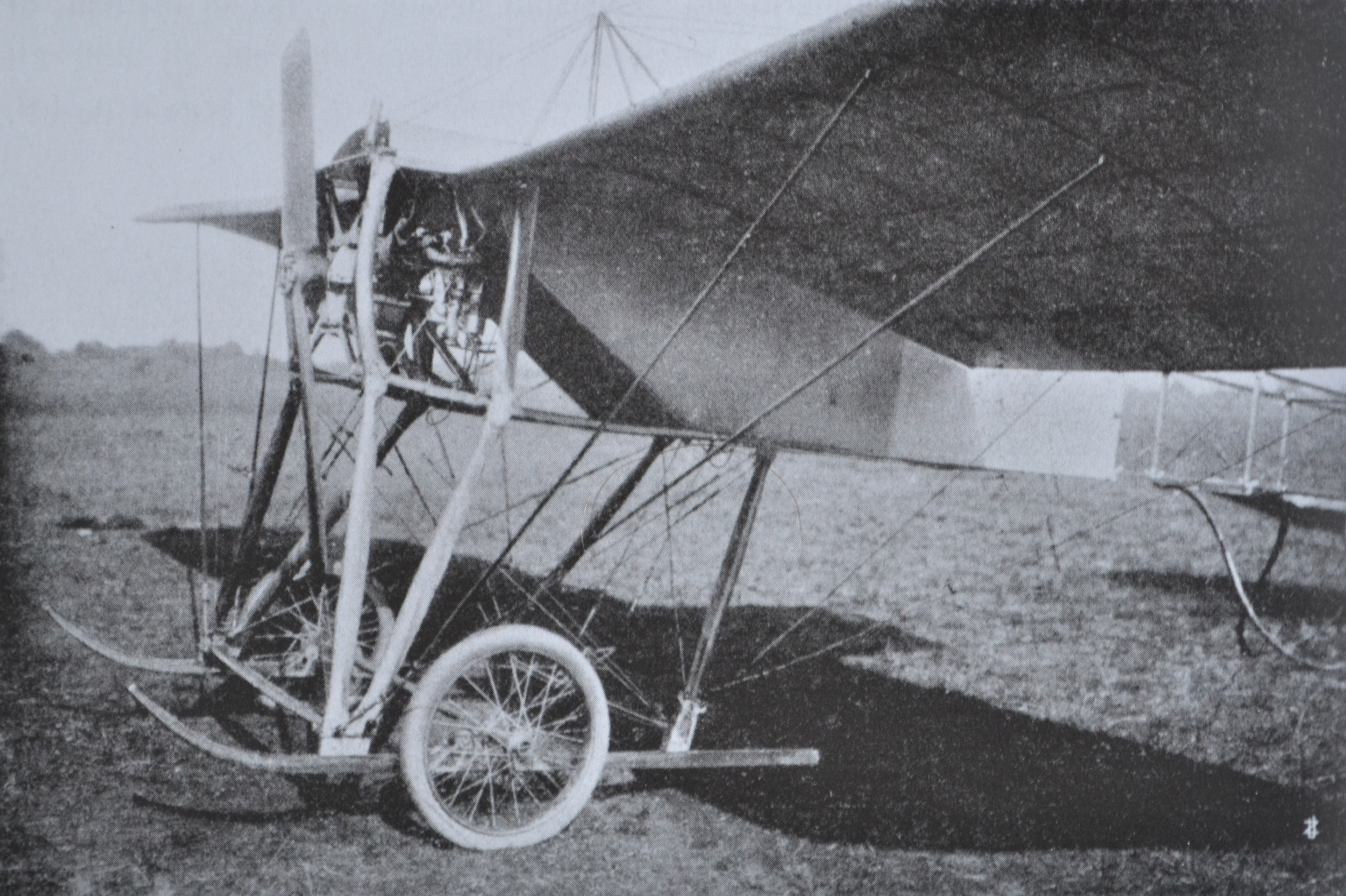

General information
- Type: pioneering aircraft
- Manufacturer: Caproni
- Status: retired
- Number built: 1

History
- First flight: 13 June 1911

The Caproni Ca.8 was a single-seat monoplane designed and built by Caproni in the early 1910s.

== Design ==
The Ca.8 was a light, single-seater, single-engine aircraft, equipped with a wing in a medium-high position and with tailing in the tail. The fuselage was composed of a wooden trellis, reinforced by tie rods in a metal cable and with metal joints in turn; its front part, between the engine and the trailing edge of the wing, was covered with canvas, while the rest was uncovered. The wing, with an appreciable angle of dihedral, had in turn a wooden structure covered with canvas; it had no ailerons, and the roll control depended on a wing warping system; the deformation of the wing ends to guarantee warping was made by some tie rods which, like the bracing cables which reinforced the wing itself, were fixed to the top of a pyramidal structure located above and in front of the uncovered pilot station.

The empennages consisted of a horizontal plane placed under the fuselage and an entirely movable vertical plane hinged to the rear end of the fuselage itself. The landing gear consisted of a pair of spoked wheels placed under the front of the aircraft, to the supporting structure of which were also linked two wooden skids in anti-rollover function, and a tail skid arranged between the trailing edge of the wing and the leading edge of the horizontal tail plane.

The powertrain consisted of a fanless 3-cylinder Anzani engine with 25 hp and a fixed pitch wooden two - blade propeller, placed at the top of the aircraft in a trailing position.

== Operational use ==
The Caproni Ca.8 made its first flight on June 13, 1911. It then performed a series of test flights and some public performances; the latter, performed for the benefit of spectators coming from Vizzola Ticino and the surrounding area, were highly appreciated by the public and soon became a regular appointment, which resulted in a series of elegant social occasions.

Subsequently, the Ca.8 successfully covered the role of training aircraft; the pilot school that was established under the company Ingg. De Agostini & Caproni Aviation formed about ten pilots on the Ca.8 during the summer of 1911; among them Costantino Quaglia (who participated in the Libyan campaign as an aviator), Enrico Cobioni (who later would have beaten several records and would have become the head instructor of the school), Costantino Biego (who would then command the Battalion Aviators of the Aeronautical Service ) and the Russian Costantino Akakew (who in 1921 would become the first commander of the Soviet Air Force).

== Specifications ==
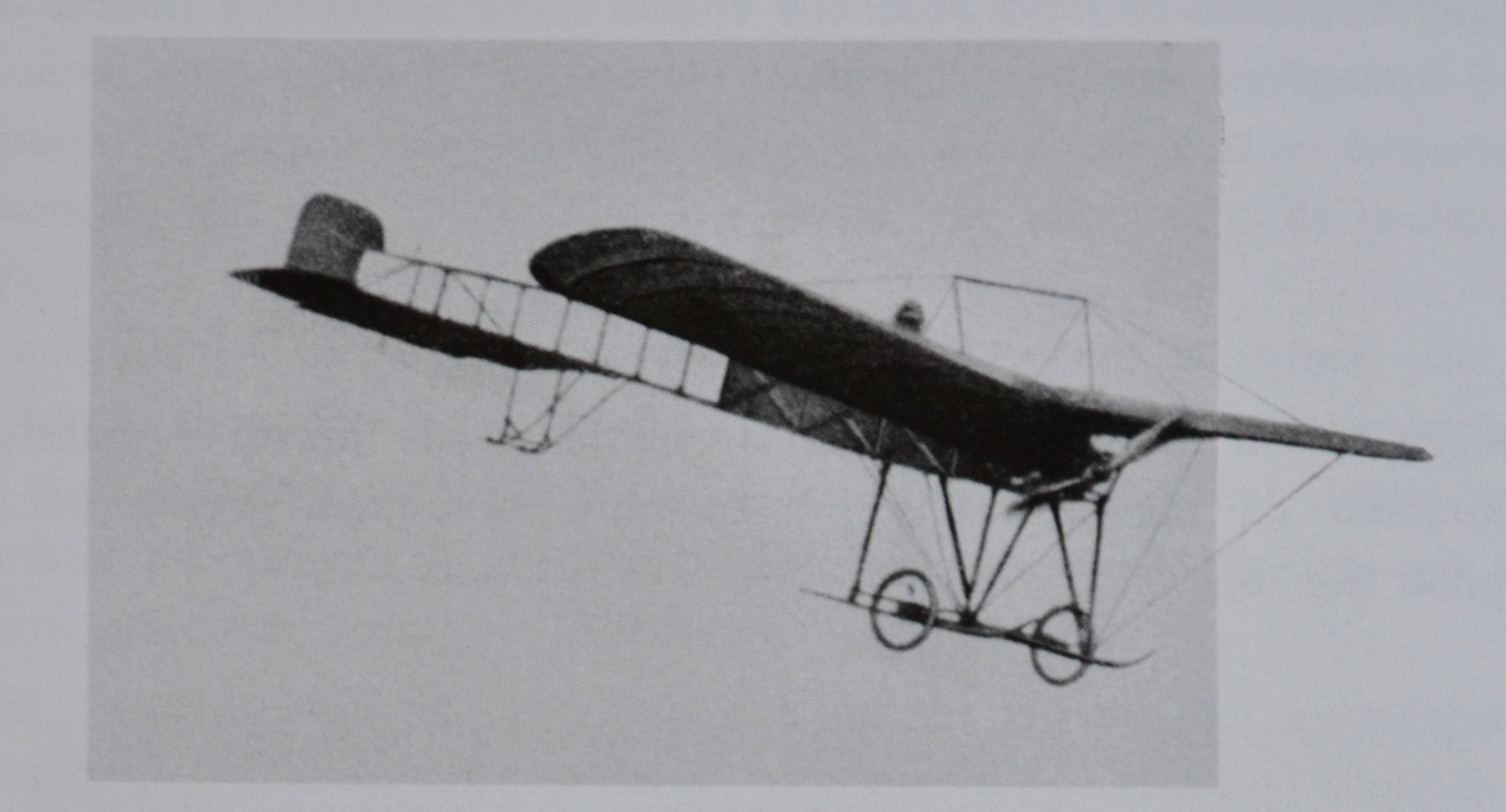
in flight

Data from Aeroplani Caproni – Gianni Caproni ideatore e costruttore di ali italiane

General characteristics

- Crew: 1
- Length: 8.16 m (26 ft 9 in)
- Wingspan: 8.88 m (29 ft 2 in)
- Wing area: 14 m^{2} (150 sq ft)
- Empty weight: 200 kg (441 lb)
- Gross weight: 320 kg (705 lb)
- Powerplant: 1 × Anzani 3-cyl air-cooled radial piston engine, 37 kW (50 hp)
- Propellers: 2-bladed fixed pitch propeller

Performance

- Maximum speed: 70 km/h (43 mph, 38 kn)

== See also ==
- Giovanni Battista Caproni
