= 1919 Verona Caproni Ca.48 crash =

Plane crash in Verona, Italy

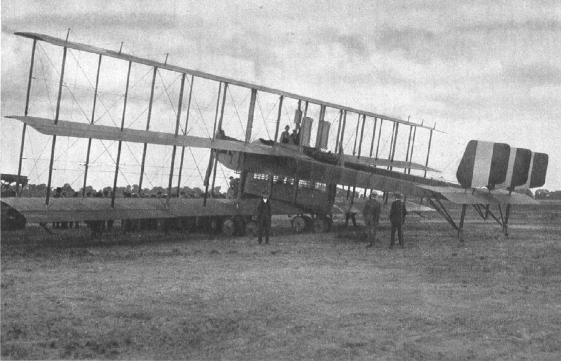
- A Caproni Ca.48 airliner

Accident
- Date: August 2, 1919
- Summary: Possible structural failure
- Site: Verona, Italy; 45°23′47″N 10°53′17″E

Aircraft
- Aircraft type: Caproni Ca.48
- Operator: Caproni
- Flight origin: Venice, Italy
- Destination: Taliedo, Milan, Italy
- Passengers: 12, 13, 14, or 15 (sources disagree)
- Crew: 2
- Fatalities: (14, 15, 16, or 17; (sources disagree)
- Survivors: 0

On August 2, 1919, a Caproni Ca.48 airliner crashed at Verona, Italy. All aboard died, with various sources placing the death toll at 14, 15, 16, and 17. It was Italy‘s first commercial aviation disaster and the earliest heavier-than-air airliner disaster in history.

== Flight history ==
The Caproni Ca.48, owned and operated by the Caproni company and flown by two Italian military pilots, took off from the company's home airfield at Taliedo, a district of Milan, Italy, on Saturday, August 2, 1919, at 7:30 a.m. local time for a flight to Venice, where it arrived without incident at 9:22 a.m. After spending the day at Venice, the aircraft took off at 5:00 p.m. for the return flight to Taliedo. Eyewitnesses reported that as the airliner passed near the airfield at Verona at an altitude of 3,000 feet (910 m), its wings seemed first to flutter and then to collapse entirely. Several of the people on board jumped from the aircraft to their deaths before it crashed. There were no survivors. Wreckage of the airliner was found scattered over an area with a radius of over 400 metres (1,310 ft).

== Aircraft ==
The Ca.48, a large triplane, was an airliner conversion of the Caproni Ca.42 variant of the Caproni Ca.4 heavy bomber; such bombers had seen service with the air component of the Italian Royal Army during World War I in strikes against targets in Austria-Hungary, as well as with the British Royal Naval Air Service. Caproni carried out the Ca. 48 airliner conversion by removing all armament and mounting a double-deck cabin with large windows and seating for 23 passengers on the aircraft. Although it generated excitement when first introduced to the public, the Ca.48 probably never entered airline service.

== Casualties ==
Sources agree that everyone aboard died in the crash, but differ on the number of people on board. A source published five days after the accident claims that 14 people – the airliner's two pilots; five prominent Italian journalists, among them Tullo Morgagni; and seven Caproni company mechanics – were on board. Later sources place the death toll at 15 and 17 without further explanation, and another identifies by name a total of 16 people killed on the plane.
