= CA 91 =

CA91 may refer to:

- California State Route 91, a highway in the US state of California
- Caproni Ca.91, an experimental aircraft
- Caldwell 91, a star cluster
