= Caproni Ca.22 =

1910s Italian aircraft

Caproni Ca.22, Ca.23, and Ca.24
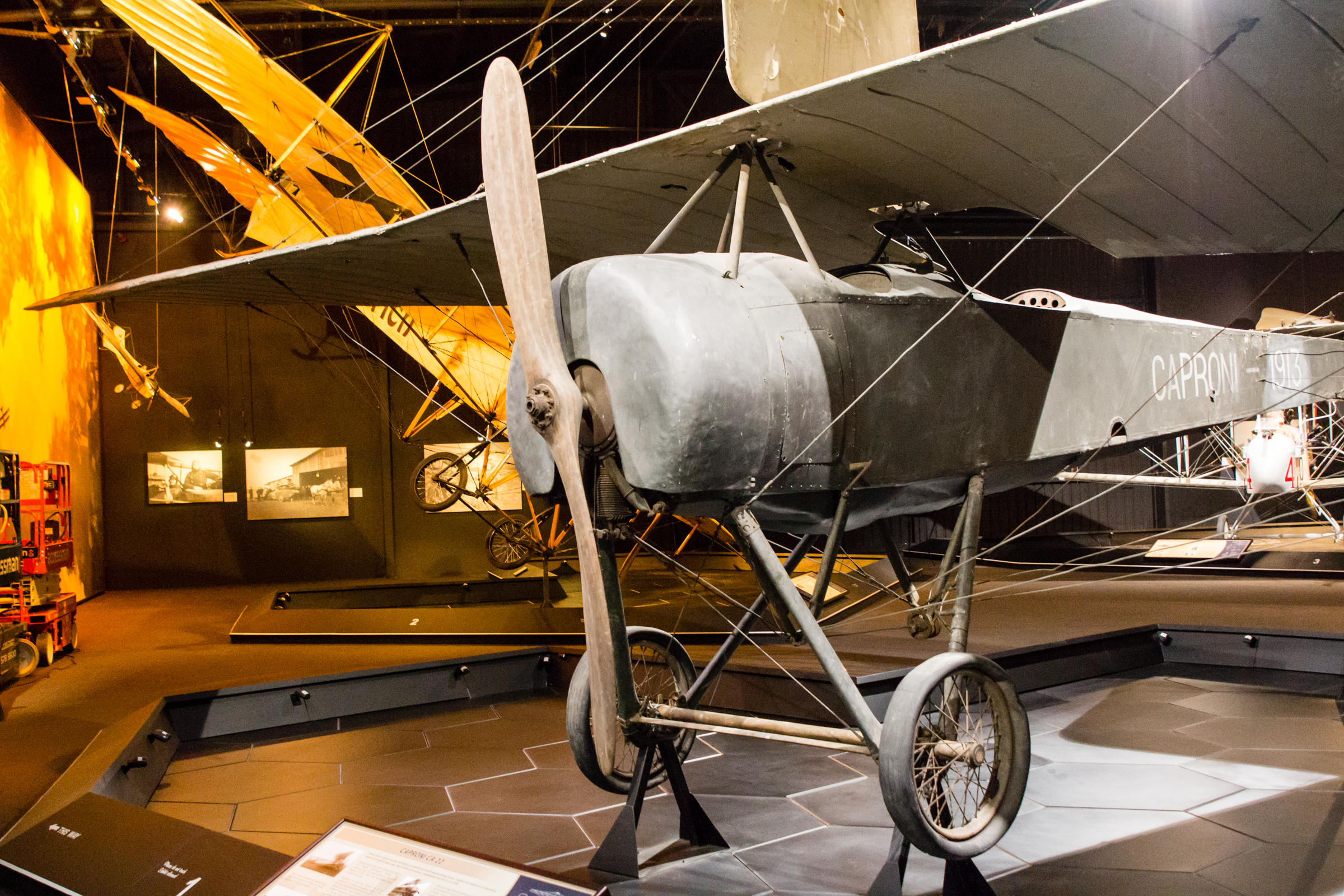

General information
- Type: experimental aircraft
- Manufacturer: Caproni
- Designer: Giovanni Battista Caproni
- Number built: 3

History
- First flight: 1913

The Caproni Ca.22 was a single-engine monoplane made by the Italian company Aeronautica Caproni in 1913.

== Design ==
Developed on the initiative of Giovanni Battista "Gianni" Caproni was made in a single sample for research purposes to study the characteristics of an aircraft equipped with an angle wing of variable incidence. In fact, the wing was in three pieces and was anteriorly hinged on the front side member which served as a rotation axis for the same; the variation of incidence of the wing was commanded by a handwheel that commanded a helical tube that acted on the rear pylon. Moreover, with a system of tie-rods, the rear planes of the tail were controlled so as to compensate for the variations in pressure exerted on the wing, maintaining the longitudinal equilibrium of the optimal aircraft.

The Ca.22 in 1913 obtained various world records of height and ascent.

== Operational history ==
On 30 June 1915 the pilots of the 15th Reconnaissance and Combat Squadron withdraw the Caproni 2 Parasol 100 hp to Vizzola Ticino, taking them to the flight field of Pordenone but after the accidents on the new aircraft, one of which causes the death of a pilot for the breaking of a wing, the squadron was dissolved on 15 September 1915.

== Variants ==
Ca.22
Single-engine monoplane with variable-incidence mainplanes, powered by an80 hp (60 kW) Gnome Lambda rotary engine
Ca.23
Fixed incidence wing, 100 hp (75 kW) Fiat engine.
Ca.24
Fixed incidence wing, 100 hp (75 kW) Gnome 9 Delta engine, produced in series.

== Specifications (Ca.22) ==
Data from

General characteristics

- Crew: 2
- Capacity: 2 passengers
- Length: 8 m (26 ft 3 in)
- Wingspan: 14.14 m (46 ft 5 in)
- Height: 3.5 m (11 ft 6 in)
- Wing area: 29.18 m^{2} (314.1 sq ft)
- Empty weight: 480 kg (1,058 lb)
- Gross weight: 980 kg (2,161 lb)
- Powerplant: 1 × Gnome Lambda 9-cylinder air-cooled rotary piston engines, 60 kW (80 hp)
- Propellers: 2-bladed fixed pitch propellers

Performance

- Maximum speed: 125 km/h (78 mph, 67 kn)
- Cruise speed: 60 km/h (37 mph, 32 kn)
- Endurance: 5 hours
- Service ceiling: 5,200 m (17,100 ft)
- Rate of climb: 1.66 m/s (327 ft/min)
