= Caproni Ca.73 =

Ca.73
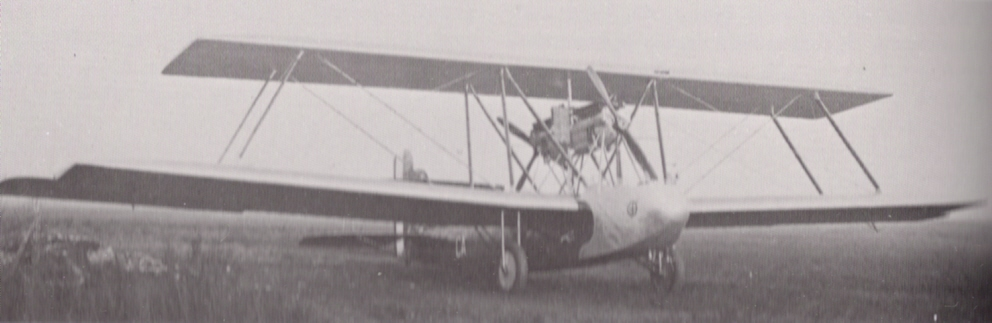
- Caproni Ca.73 airliner

General information
- Type: Airliner, later used as a bomber
- Manufacturer: Caproni
- Primary user: Regia Aeronautica

History
- First flight: 1925

The Caproni Ca.73 was an inverted sesquiplane aircraft designed produced by the Italian aircraft manufacturer Caproni.

It was originally developed for the civil market, performing its maiden flight during 1925 and being introduced as an airliner, capable of carrying up to 10 passengers at a time. The aircraft found a second use when the newly independent Regia Aeronautica sought a more capable light bomber to quickly replace its First World War era inventory. It was adapted to serve in a military capacity, being outfitted with multiple defensive machine guns and bomb racks. It continued to be used in front line military roles into the mid-1930s.

== Design and development ==
The Caproni Ca.73 was an inverted sesquiplane with a biplane tail, a rigid central section, and powered by a pair of engines mounted in a push-pull configuration within a common nacelle that was mounted on struts in the interplane gap above the fuselage. The fuselage was positioned wholly below the lower wing, an arrangement that was considered to be less prone to accidents during landings as well as being fairly buoyant in the event of a forced landing upon water. Considerable reinforcement of the base of the fuselage was present so that the aircraft could better cope with such landings.

In an airliner configuration, the interior of the fuselage contains a pair of seats in a side-by-side arrangement for the two pilots, while ten passenger seats were also present, arranged into two rows with a central aisle between. Alongside the carriage of passengers, the aircraft could also haul up to 300 lb of baggage or air mail. The later-build military variant remained quite similar to the commercial aircraft; changes revolved around the equipment fitout of the fuselage, which consisted of various military armaments in place of the passenger equipment. This armament consisted of three machine guns for self-defence; one was mounted in the bow, another was behind the cell, and the final was underneath the cell. The firing fields of these three guns overlapped, enabling total coverage of every point of the airspace around the aircraft. A payload of 1,000 kg (2,205 lb.) of bombs can also be carried within the fuselage, being intentionally placed at the aircraft's centre of gravity.

The aircraft was typically powered by a pair of Isotta Fraschini Asso 500 engines, each capable of generating up to 500 hp, that were mounted in a tandem push-pull configuration within a common nacelle that was mounted on struts in the interplane gap above the fuselage to form a sturdy yet simplistic central structure. The oil tank was positioned between the two engines while the fuel tanks were located inside of the lower wing. Fuel was drawn out of these wing tanks by a pair of windmill pumps into a two gravity tanks positioned in the upper wing from where it flowed to both engines.

In terms of its flying characteristics, the aircraft was considered to be relatively easy to operate, possessing flight controls that were both quite responsive and fairly light, the latter being achieved via the suitable balancing of the ailerons and rudder. The aircraft was also well-centred and unaffected by a mid-flight engine outage. Furthermore, in the event of a single engine outage while carrying a payload of up to 1,500 kg (3,307 lb.), it could easily maintain an altitude of 1,000 m (3,280 ft.). The aircraft's climb performance was also considered to be relatively good for the era; while carrying a useful payload of 2,300 kg (5,070 lb.), it could attain 1,000 m in seven minutes, 2,000 m in 14 minutes and 30 seconds, 3,000 m in 23 minutes; 4,000 m in 37 minutes, and 5,000 m in 66 minutes.

== Operational history ==
The publication of General Giulio Douhet's seminal treatise on strategic bombing Il dominio dell'aria (The Command of the Air) in 1921 had left Italy's military planners acutely aware of a lack of this capability. Established as a separate service in 1923, the Regia Aeronautica initially relied upon First World War-vintage Caproni Ca.3 bombers, and a replacement was promptly sought. The immediate solution was to repurpose the existing Ca.73 as a warplane by adding a gunner's position in the nose, dorsally, and ventrally amidships. Bombs were carried on external racks on the fuselage sides.

By 1931, the Ca.73, alongside the improved Ca.74, comprised the bulk of the night bombers operated by the Regia Aeronautica. The type remained in frontline service until 1934, and from 1926 onwards participated in Italy's military actions in North Africa.

== Variants ==
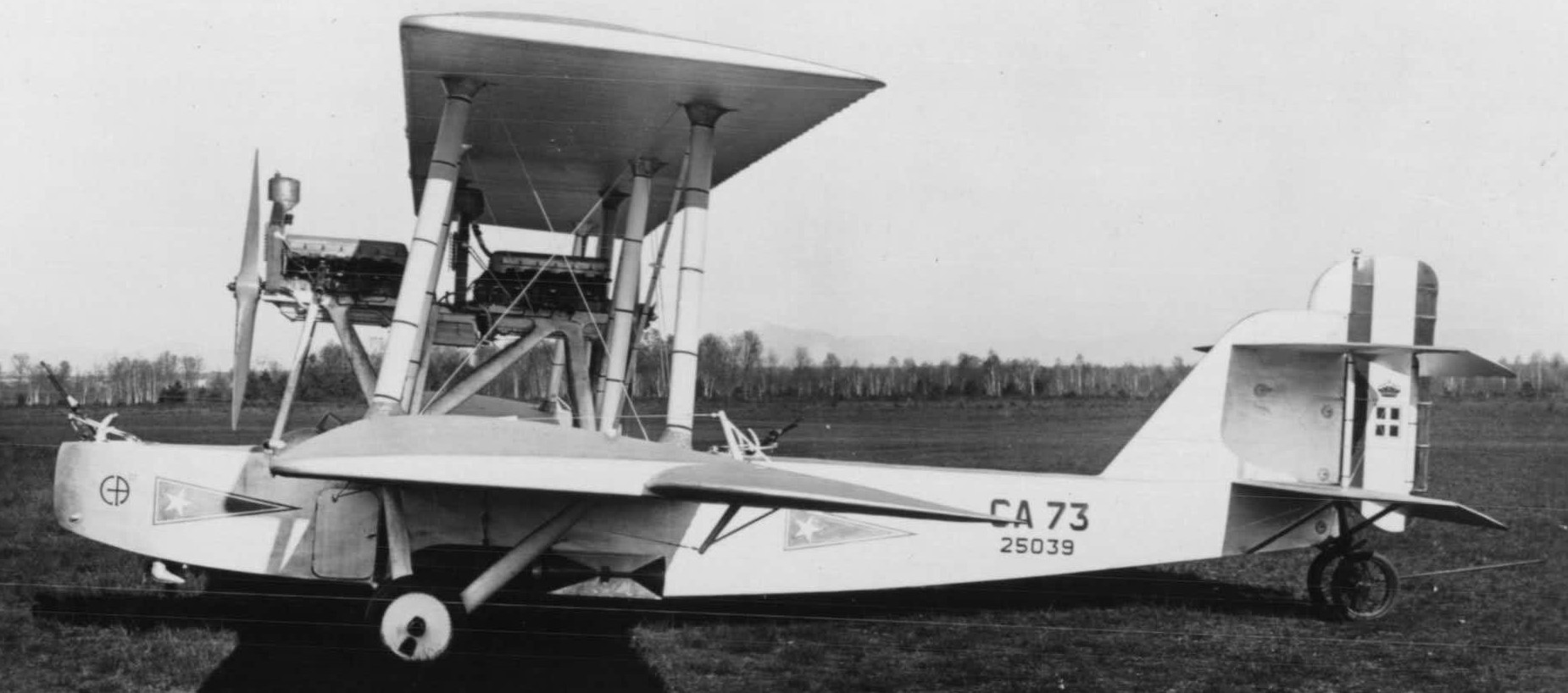
Caproni Ca.73ter bomber photo from NACA Aircraft Circular 51

- Ca.73 – airliner powered by Isotta Fraschini Asso 500 engines
  - Ca.73bis – airliner powered by Lorraine-Dietrich engines
  - Ca.73ter (later redesignated Ca.82) – bomber version with gun positions and fuselage bomb racks
  - Ca.73quarter (later redesignated Ca.88) – bomber with revised control systems and strengthened airframe
    - Ca.73quarterG (later redesignated Ca.89) – bomber with glazed nose, underwing bomb racks, and retractable ventral gun turret
  - Ca.74 (later redesignated Ca.80) – version powered by Bristol Jupiter engines
- Ca.80 – the Ca.74 redesignated
  - Ca.80S – air-ambulance and paratroop transport version
- Ca.82 – redesignated Ca.73ter
- Ca.87 – long-range record version (one converted)
- Ca.88 – redesignated Ca.73quarter
- Ca.89 – redesignated Ca.73quarterG

== Operators ==
=== Military operators ===
Kingdom of Italy

- Regia Aeronautica

== Specifications (Ca.73) ==
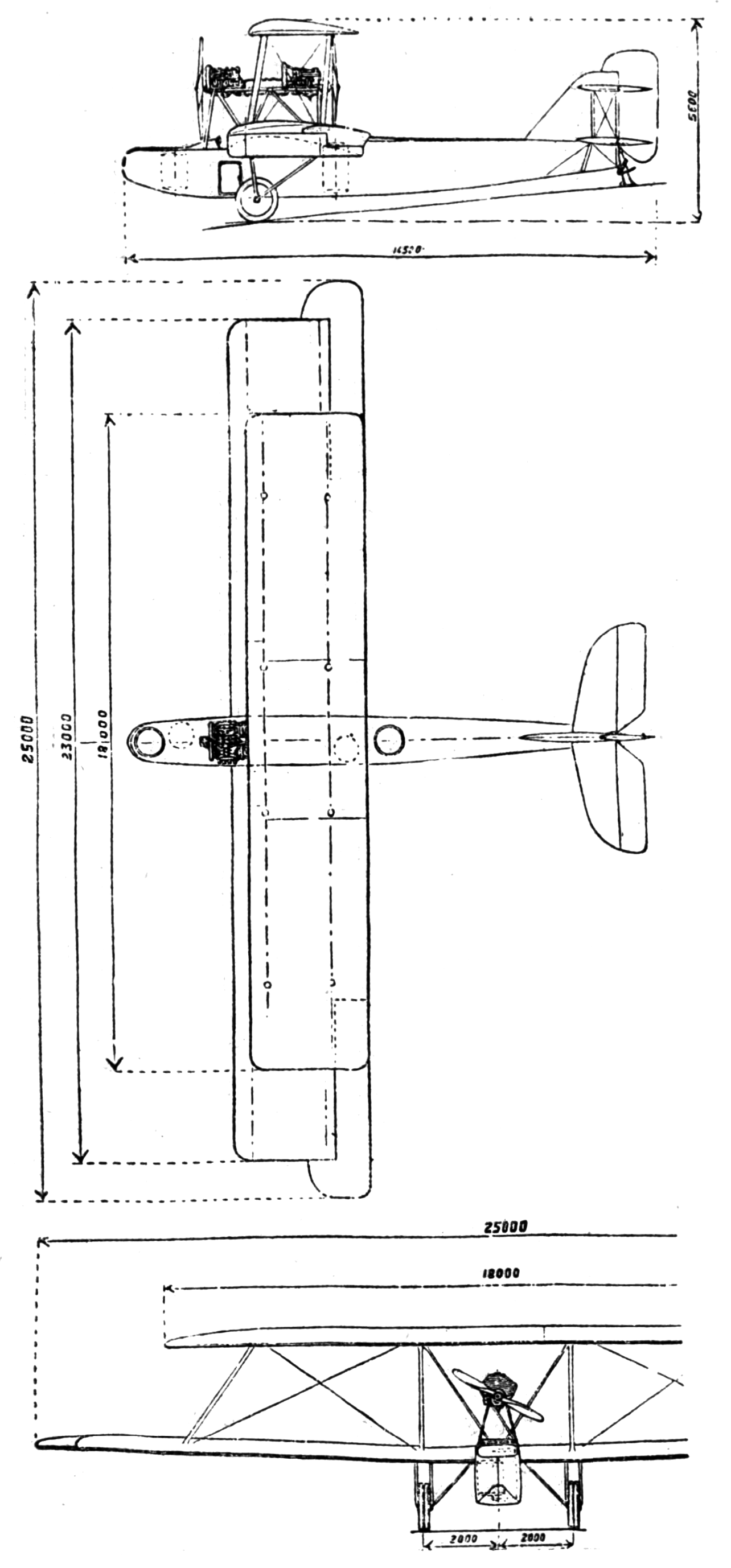
Caproni Ca.73 bis 3-view drawing from L'Aérophile March,1927

Data from National Advisory Committee for Aeronautics

General characteristics

- Crew: Two pilots
- Capacity: ten passengers
- Length: 15.10 m (49 ft 7 in)
- Wingspan: 25.00 m (82 ft 0 in)
- Height: 5.60 m (18 ft 5 in)
- Wing area: 143.0 m^{2} (1,539 sq ft)
- Empty weight: 3,400 kg (7,496 lb)
- Gross weight: 5,390 kg (11,883 lb)
- Powerplant: 2 × Isotta Fraschini Asso 500 , 373 kW (500 hp) each

Performance

- Maximum speed: 180 km/h (112 mph, 97 kn)
- Endurance: Three hours
- Service ceiling: 4,600 m (15,080 ft)

== See also ==
Related lists

- List of Interwar military aircraft
