= Caproni Ca.14 =

General information
- Type: Long-distance aircraft
- Manufacturer: Caproni
- Designer: Giovanni Battista Caproni
- Number built: 1

History
- First flight: 1913

The Caproni Ca.14 was an early biplane developed by Giovanni Battista Caproni in the early 1910s.

== Specifications (Ca.14) ==
Data from Aeroplani Caproni: Gianni Caproni and His Aircraft, 1910-1983

General characteristics

- Crew: 1
- Capacity: 1
- Length: 7.8 m (25 ft 7 in)
- Wingspan: 11.8 m (38 ft 9 in)
- Wing area: 24 m^{2} (260 sq ft)
- Empty weight: 435 kg (959 lb)
- Gross weight: 685 kg (1,510 lb)
- Powerplant: 1 × Gnome 7 Lambda 7-cylinder air-cooled rotary piston engine, 60 kW (80 hp)
- Propellers: 2-bladed fixed-pitch propeller

Performance

- Maximum speed: 120 km/h (75 mph, 65 kn)
