= Caproni Ca.49 =

Type of aircraft

Ca.49

General information
- Type: Seaplane airliner
- Manufacturer: Caproni
- Number built: None

History
- First flight: Never

The Caproni Ca.49 was a proposed Italian seaplane airliner of 1919.

== Development ==
In 1919, the Caproni company designed the Ca.49, a passenger seaplane intended for use as an airliner. The proposed aircraft would have been a four-engine triplane, with three engines driving tractor propellers and one driving a pusher propeller. Although no specific engine selection was made, Caproni envisioned the four engines as being rated at between 224 and 279 kilowatts (300 and 375 horsepower) each. Passengers would have been carried in an enclosed cabin.

No examples of the Ca.49 were built.

== Specifications (Ca.49 estimated) ==
Data from

General characteristics

- Crew: 2
- Length: 13 m (42 ft 8 in)
- Wingspan: 34.5 m (113 ft 2 in)
- Height: 7.8 m (25 ft 7 in)
- Wing area: 200 m^{2} (2,200 sq ft)
- Powerplant: 4 × unknown 224–279 kw (300–375 hp)

Performance

- Maximum speed: 140 km/h (87 mph, 76 kn)

== See also ==
Related lists

- List of flying boats and floatplanes
