= Caproni Ca.164 =

Ca.164
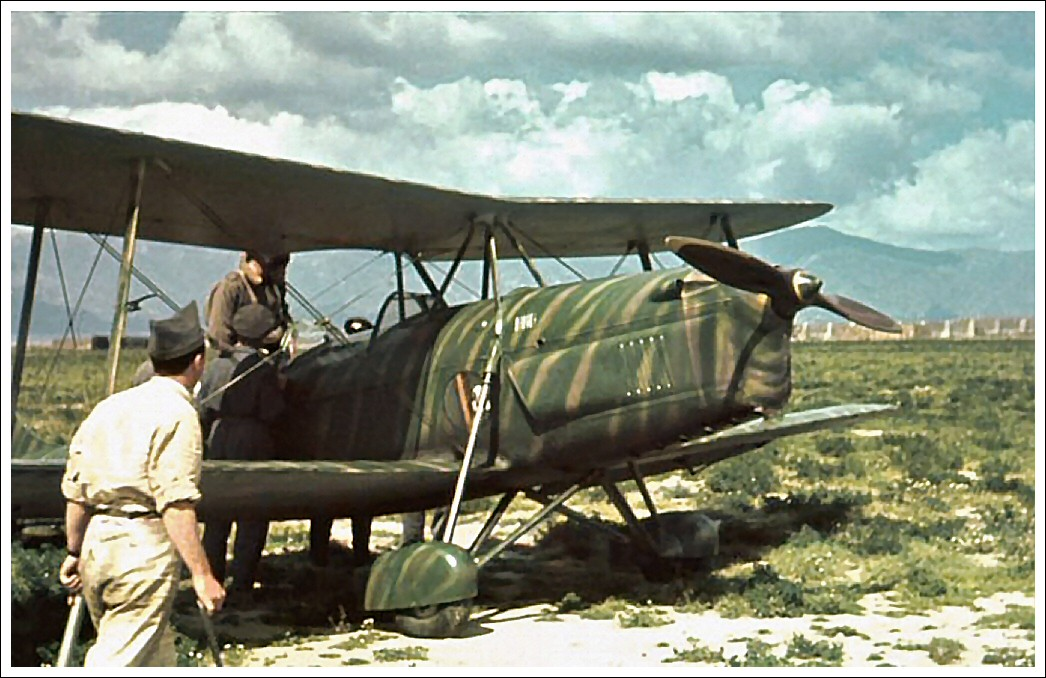

General information
- Type: Military trainer aircraft
- Manufacturer: Caproni
- Designer: Raffaele Conflenti
- Primary users: Regia Aeronautica Armée de l'Air
- Number built: 280 + 1 prototype

History
- First flight: 1938

The Caproni Ca.164 was a training biplane produced in Italy shortly prior to World War II. It was a largely conventional biplane intended as a follow-on to the Ca.100 and sharing that aircraft's layout with a slightly smaller upper wing.

== Development ==
The prototype was designated the Ca.163, built by Caproni Taliedo and first flown on 17 November 1938. It had a steel tube fuselage, wooden wings, and fabric covering. Flight testing revealed some poor handling characteristics, however, which made it completely unsuitable for its intended role. Nevertheless, the Regia Aeronautica acquired some 280 examples of the Ca.164 to use in liaison roles within bomber units. Some of these were pressed into use for tactical reconnaissance during the Croatian campaign. The Armée de l'Air also purchased 100 aircraft.

== Operators ==
France

- Armee de l'Air

Kingdom of Italy

- Regia Aeronautica
- Italian Co-Belligerent Air Force

Italy

- Italian Air Force

== Surviving aircraft ==
No examples of the Ca.164 survive, but the prototype Ca.163 is on display at the Gianni Caproni Museum of Aeronautics, Trento Airport, Italy. As a private venture, it was originally not registered, but it was later registered I-WEST.

== Specifications ==
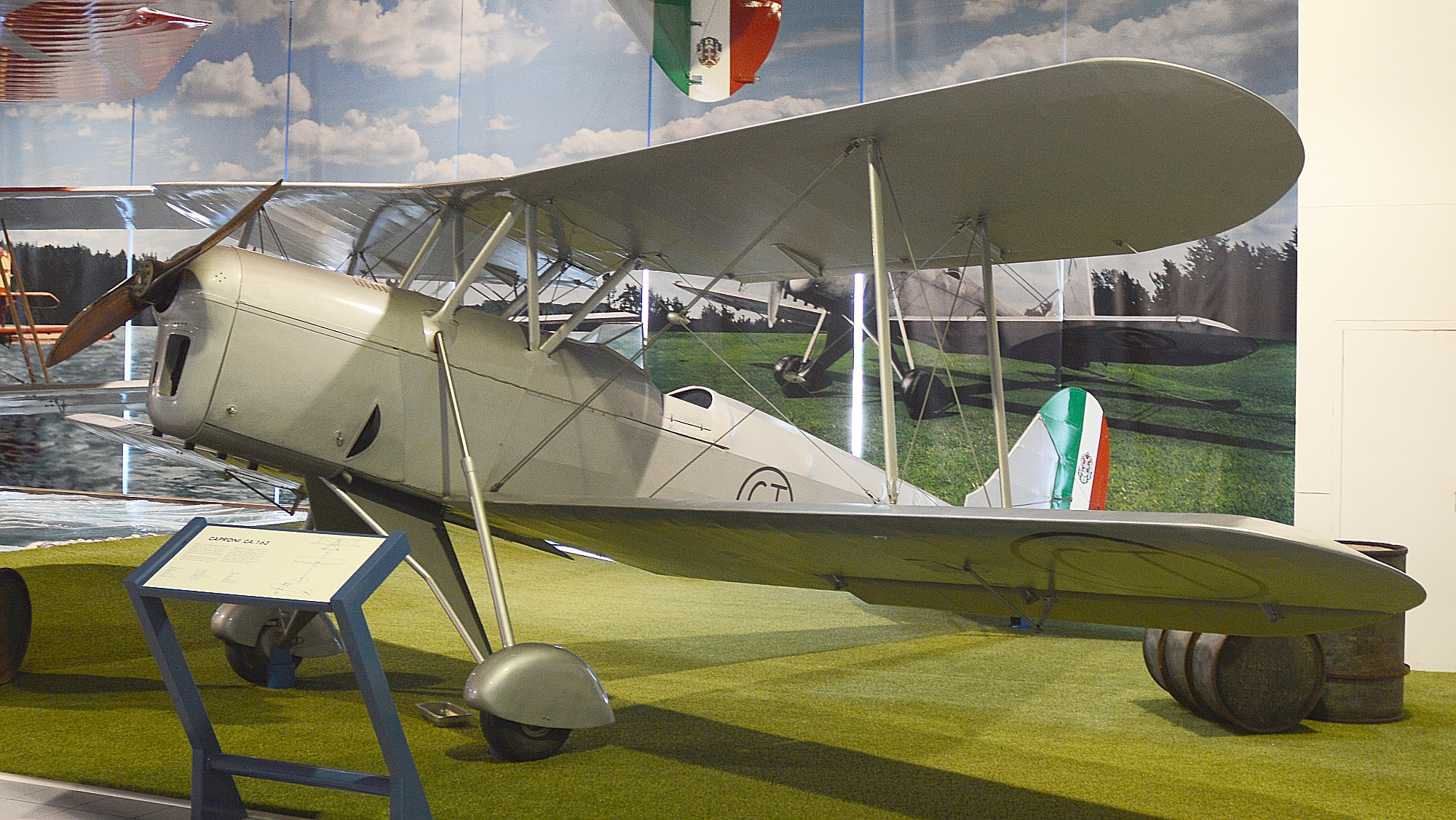
The prototype Ca.163 on display at the Caproni Museum, Trento

Data from Dimensione Cielo: Aerei italiani nella 2^{a} guerra mondiale: Vol. 10 Scuola-Collegamento

General characteristics

- Crew: 2, pilot and instructor
- Length: 7.74 m (25 ft 5 in)
- Wingspan: 9.45 m (31 ft 0 in)
- Height: 3.00 m (9 ft 10 in)
- Wing area: 22.4 m^{2} (241 sq ft)
- Empty weight: 780 kg (1,720 lb)
- Gross weight: 1,040 kg (2,293 lb)
- Fuel capacity: 135 L (30 imp gal; 36 US gal)
- Powerplant: 1 × Alfa Romeo 115 bis air-cooled 6-cylinder inline engine, 138 kW (185 hp)
- Propellers: 2-bladed wooden fixed-pitch propeller

Performance

- Maximum speed: 217 km/h (135 mph, 117 kn)
- Cruise speed: 185 km/h (115 mph, 100 kn)
- Stall speed: 85 km/h (53 mph, 46 kn)
- Range: 550 km (340 mi, 300 nmi)
- Service ceiling: 4,250 m (13,940 ft)
- Time to altitude: 15 minutes 56 s to 3,000 m (9,800 ft)

== See also ==
Related lists

- List of aircraft of World War II
- List of Interwar military aircraft

== Bibliography ==
- Brotzu, E.; Cosolo, G. (1977). Dimensione Cielo: Aerei italiani nella 2^{a} guerra mondiale: Vol. 10 Scuola-Collegamento (in Italian). Rome: Edizioni Dell'Ateneo & Bizzarri.
- Domange, Yves (February 1999). "Quand les démocraties occidentales achetaient des avions dans l'Italie fasciste... (1^{ère} partie: la France)" [When Western Democracies Bought Their Aircraft from Fascist Italy... (Part 1: France)]. Avions: Toute l'aéronautique et son histoire (in French). No. 71. pp. 16–24. ISSN 1243-8650.
- Morareau, Lucien (March 1999). "Courrier des Lecteurs" [Readers' Letters]. Avions: Toute l'aéronautique et son histoire (in French). No. 72. p. 3. ISSN 1243-8650.
- Němeček, Václav (1979). "Letadla 39–45: Caproni-Predappio Ca-164". Letectví + Kosmonautika (in Czech). No. 11. p. 430.
- Taylor, Michael J. H. (1989). Jane's Encyclopedia of Aviation. London: Studio Editions. p. 236.
- World Aircraft Information Files. London: Bright Star Publishing. pp. File 891 Sheet 10.
