= Caproni Ca.309 =

Italian reconnaissance and military transport aircraft

Ca.309
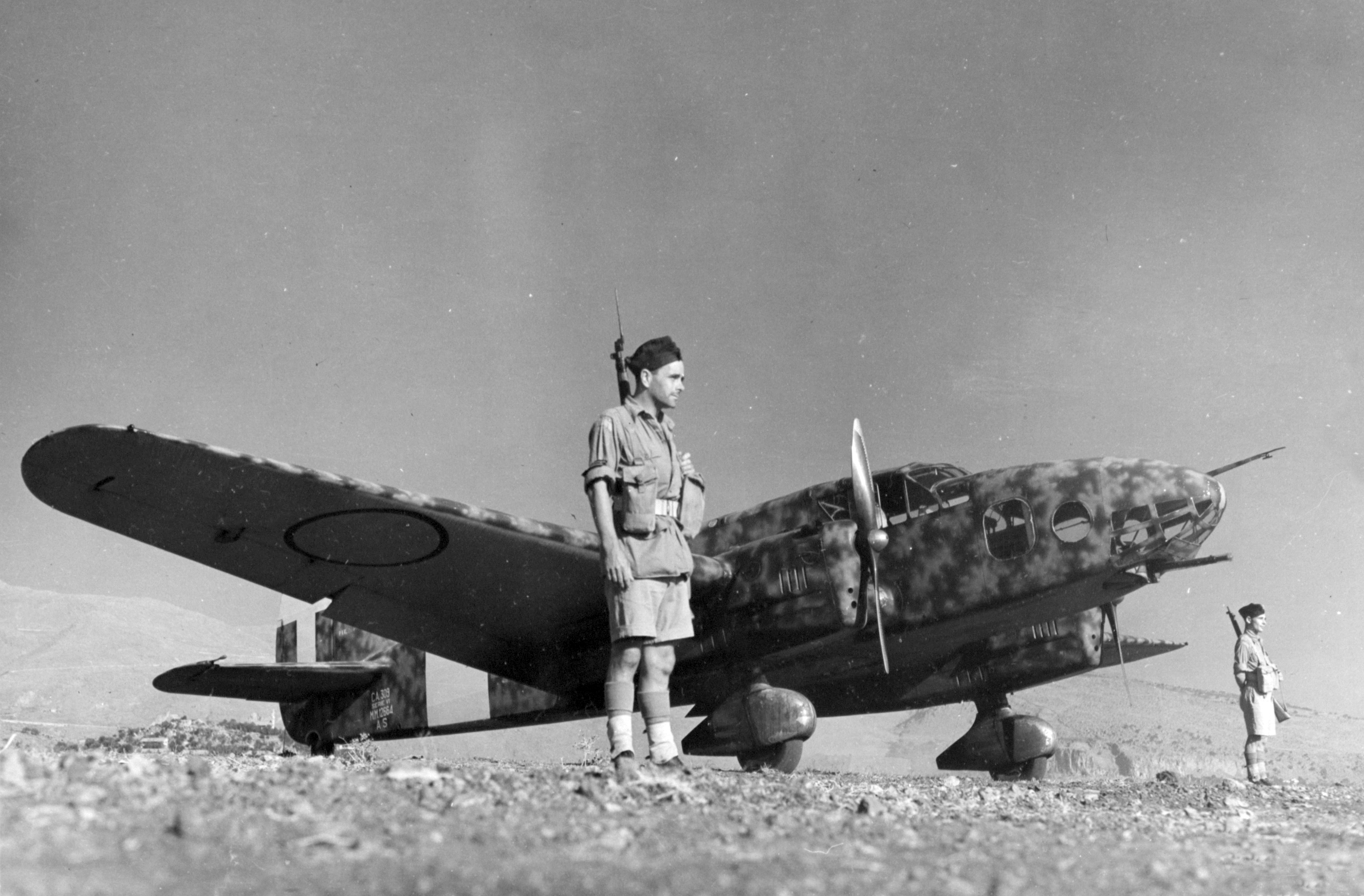
- Caproni Ca.309 in Palermo, Sicily. September, 1943.

General information
- Type: Reconnaissance
- Manufacturer: Caproni
- Primary users: Regia Aeronautica Bulgarian Air Force; Paraguayan Air Arm

History
- First flight: 1937
- Retired: 1948

The Caproni Ca.309 Ghibli was an Italian aircraft used in Libya and North Africa from 1937 to 1943. Its nickname, 'Ghibli', refers to a Libyan desert wind.

== Development ==
The Caproni Ca.309 was designed by Cesare Pallavicino, based on the Ca.308 Borea transport. It was intended to replace the obsolete IMAM Ro.1 biplane, and to serve as a reconnaissance and ground-attack aircraft.

The Ca.309 was a low-wing cantilever monoplane with a piston engine fitted to each wing.

The aircraft was also produced in Bulgaria. That variant, 24 of which were built, was known as the Kaproni-Bulgarski KB 6/KB 309 Papagal.

== Operations ==
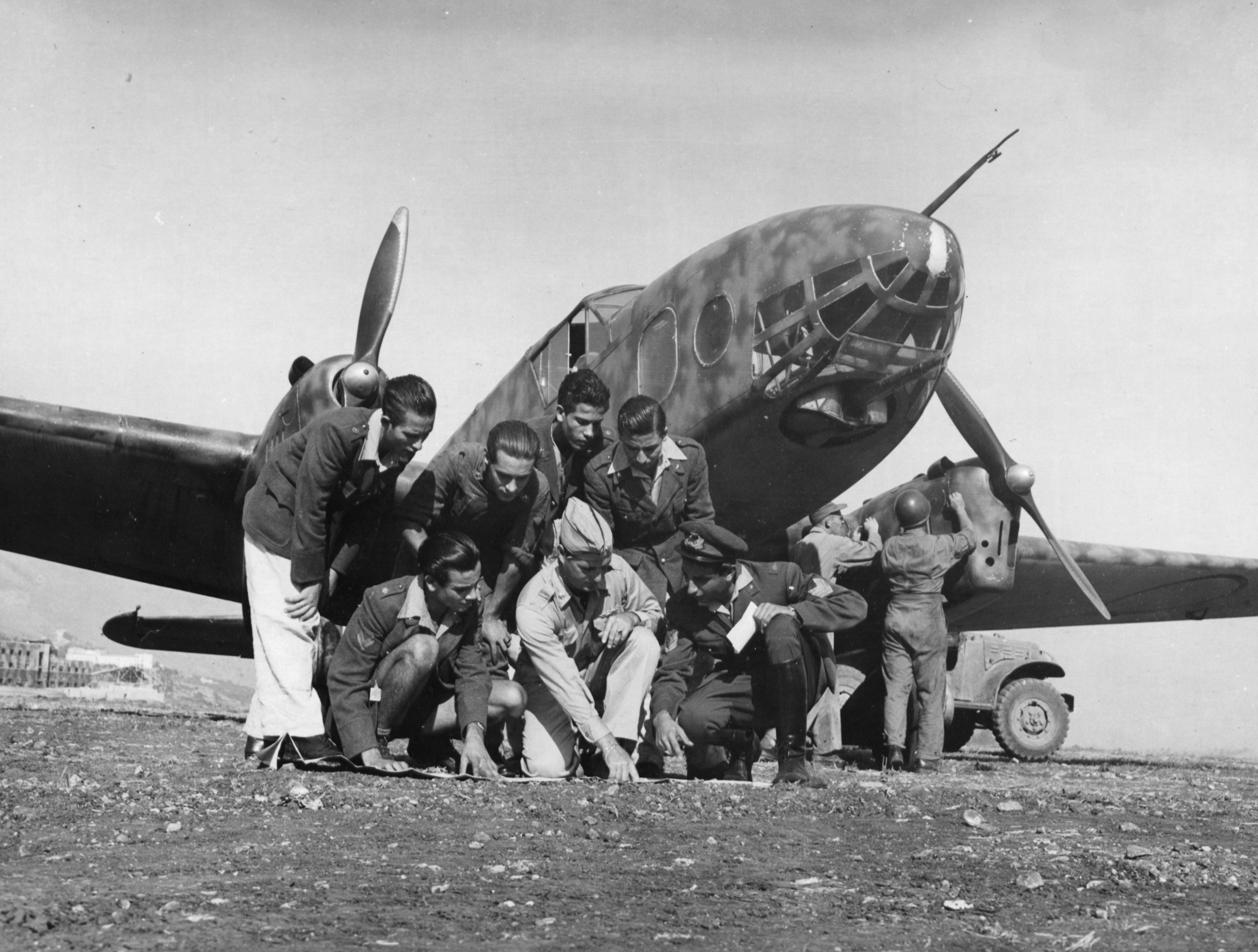
Ca.309 in Palermo, Sicily. 1943.

The Ca.309 served in Libya during the first part of World War II with the Auto-Saharan Company, with good operational results.

After the loss of the African colonies the surviving planes were returned to Italy, where they were used as transports. Two Ghiblis were bought by the Paraguayan government for its Military Air Arm. They were used as transport planes from 1939 to 1945 and in that year they were transferred to Líneas Aéreas de Transporte Nacional (LATN), the first Paraguayan airline which was run by the Military Aviation. They were in active service until the early 1950s and later sold to a private Argentine owner.

== Operators ==
Kingdom of Italy

- Regia Aeronautica, operated 243 Caproni Ca.309

Italy

- Italian Air Force

Bulgaria

- Bulgarian Air Force

Paraguay

- Paraguayan Air Arm (two Ca.309)
- Líneas Aéreas de Transporte Nacional (LATN) used two ex-Paraguayan Air Arm Ca.309s

== Specifications (Ca.309 production) ==
Data from Italian Civil and Military Aircraft 1930–1945

General characteristics

- Crew: 3
- Length: 13.29 m (43 ft 7 1/4 in)
- Wingspan: 16.2 m (53 ft 2 in)
- Height: 3.04 m (10 ft 0 in)
- Wing area: 38.7 m^{2} (417 sq ft)
- Empty weight: 1,960 kg (4,321 lb)
- Gross weight: 2,930 kg (6,460 lb)
- Powerplant: 2 × Alfa Romeo 115-II (or 115-I) 6-cylinder inverted air-cooled in-line piston engines, 291 kW (390 hp) each

Performance

- Maximum speed: 250 km/h (160 mph, 130 kn)
- Cruise speed: 209 km/h (130 mph, 113 kn)
- Range: 671 km (417 mi, 362 nmi)
- Service ceiling: 4,500 m (14,800 ft)
- Time to altitude: 2,890 m (9,480 ft) in 17 minutes 30 seconds

Armament

- Guns: 3 × 7.7 mm (.303 in) Breda SAFAT machine guns
- Bombs: up to 330 kg

== Legacy ==
The aircraft lends its nickname to Studio Ghibli, a Japanese animation studio known for its feature films and is featured in the film The Wind Rises.

== See also ==
Related lists

- List of aircraft of World War II
- List of bomber aircraft
- List of Regia Aeronautica aircraft used in World War II

== Bibliography ==
- Andreev, Jordan (April 1999). "Les avions Kaproni-Bulgarski (fin)" [Kaproni-Bulgarski Aircraft]. Avions: Toute l'Aéronautique et son histoire (in French) (73): 45–52. ISSN 1243-8650.
- Lucchini, Carlo (April 1999). "Le meeting saharien de 1938" [The 1938 Sahara Air Meeting]. Avions: Toute l'Aéronautique et son histoire (in French) (73): 53–57. ISSN 1243-8650.
- Sapienza, Antonio Luis (May 2001). "L'aviation militare paraguayenne durant la seconde guerre mondiale" [Paraguayan Military Aviation During the Second World War]. Avions: Toute l'Aéronautique et son histoire (in French) (98): 30–33. ISSN 1243-8650.
- Sapienza, Antonio Luis (June 2000). "Les premiers avions de transport commercial au Paraguay" [The First Commercial Transport Aircraft in Paraguay]. Avions: Toute l'Aéronautique et son histoire (in French) (87): 45–47. ISSN 1243-8650.
