= Caproni Bergamaschi PL.3 =

PL.3
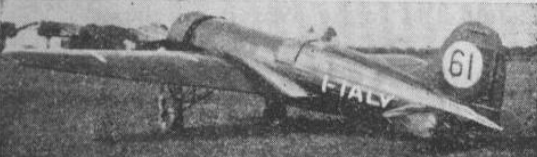

General information
- Type: Long distance racer
- National origin: Italy
- Manufacturer: Caproni Bergamaschi
- Designer: Cesare Pallavicino
- Number built: 1

The Caproni Bergamaschi PL.3 was designed and built in Italy to compete in the 1934 London-to-Melbourne air race. It was a single-engine cantilever monoplane with clean lines, retractable undercarriage and side-by-side seating for two. Though it was registered as a race entrant, late delays prevented it from competing.

== Design and development ==
The PL.3 had a low wing built entirely of wood, covered with plywood, tapering uniformly both in chord and thickness from wide, deep roots to rounded tips. The tail was conventional, the tailplane set at mid-fuselage with straight swept leading edges and carrying elevators with trim tabs. The fin was triangular, with a rounded rudder ending above the fuselage.

In contrast the fuselage of the PL.3 was mostly of metal construction. From propeller to aft of the wing root the fuselage was a tube of constant diameter, set by the wide chord NACA cowling around its 525 kW (700 hp) licence-built Pratt & Whitney Hornet radial engine, which then tapered to the tail. The underlying structure from nose to tail was a rectangular chrome molybdenum steel frame, aluminium covered in front and plywood behind. The low profile cockpit placed the crew at the wing trailing edge. The PL.3 had a conventional undercarriage with mainwheels retracting rearwards into the wing, leaving a small part exposed.

== Operational history ==
The PL.3 was one of many types entered into the London-Melbourne race of 1934 for the MacRobertson Trophy and £10,000 prize. The race was scheduled to start on 20 October 1934 The PL.3 was entered in May 1934. By early September it had a race number, 61, and the crew had been elected; though it had not flown it was still an expected competitor. The crew were known: both Francis Lombardi and Vittori Suster were experienced flyers with careers beginning in the First World War. Lombardi had made many competitive long-distance flights and Suster had spent the last seven years as an airline pilot, latterly as chief pilot.

The exact reasons for its non-participation are not known, but the PL.3 was one of many registered competitors which cancelled early or failed to appear at RAF Mildenhall, the starting point, in the week before the start.

== Specifications ==
Data from Italian Civil and Military Aircraft 1930-1945

General characteristics

- Crew: two
- Length: 9.04 m (29 ft 8 in)
- Wingspan: 11.89 m (39 ft 0 in)
- Height: 2.77 m (9 ft 1 in)
- Wing area: 24.0 m^{2} (258 sq ft)
- Empty weight: 1,696 kg (3,740 lb)
- Gross weight: 3,493 kg (7,700 lb)
- Fuel capacity: 2,080 L (550 US gal; 460 Imp gal)
- Powerplant: 1 × Fiat A.59 9-cylinder radial, licence built Pratt & Whitney Hornet, 520 kW (700 hp)
- Propellers: 2-bladed variable pitch

Performance

- Maximum speed: 360 km/h (224 mph, 195 kn) at 3,660 m (11,152 ft)
- Range: 3,098 km (1,925 mi, 1,673 nmi)
- Time to altitude: 17 min 30 s to 4,300 m (13,120 ft)
