= Vizzola Ticino =

- Comune
- Comune di Vizzola Ticino
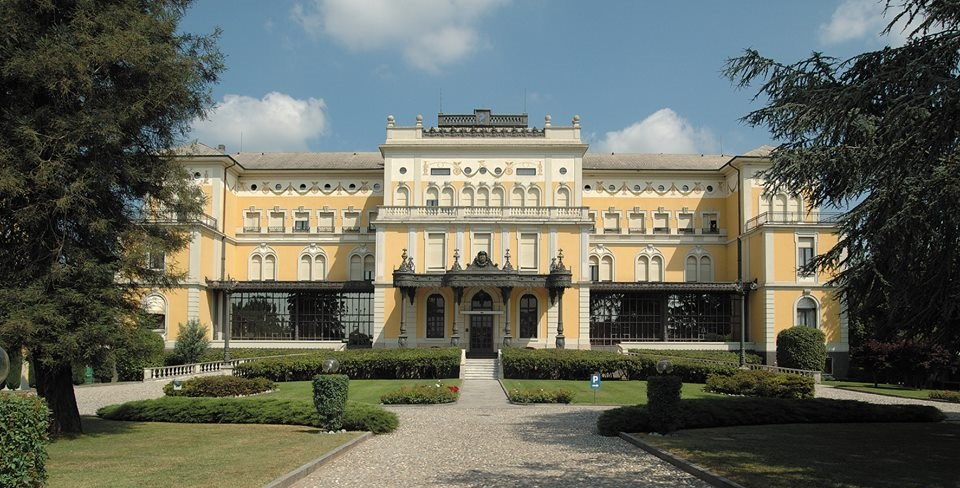

- Location within Italy Location within Lombardy
- Coordinates: 45°38′N 08°42′E
- Country: Italy
- Region: Lombardy
- Province: Varese (VA)

Area
  - Total: 7 km^{2} (2.7 sq mi)

Population (2018-01-01)
  - Total: 428
  - Density: 61/km^{2} (160/sq mi)
- Time zone: UTC+1 (CET)
  - Summer (DST): UTC+2 (CEST)
- Postal code: 21010
- Dialing code: 0331

Vizzola Ticino is a village and comune of the province of Varese in Lombardy, Italy. It is on the banks of the Ticino River, immediately to the west of Strada Provinciale 52 on the western perimeter of Malpensa Airport.

In the late 19th century, the town was the site of one of the largest electrical generating facilities in Europe, powered by a canal run from the Ticino. The Caproni aircraft company had a manufacturing facility here and the Gianni Caproni Museum of Aeronautics was situated here from the 1960s to the 1980s.

== Economy ==
Nippon Cargo Airlines has its Italy branch in the MXP Business Park in the comune, near Malpensa Airport.
