= Caproni Ca.308 Borea =

Ca.308 Borea
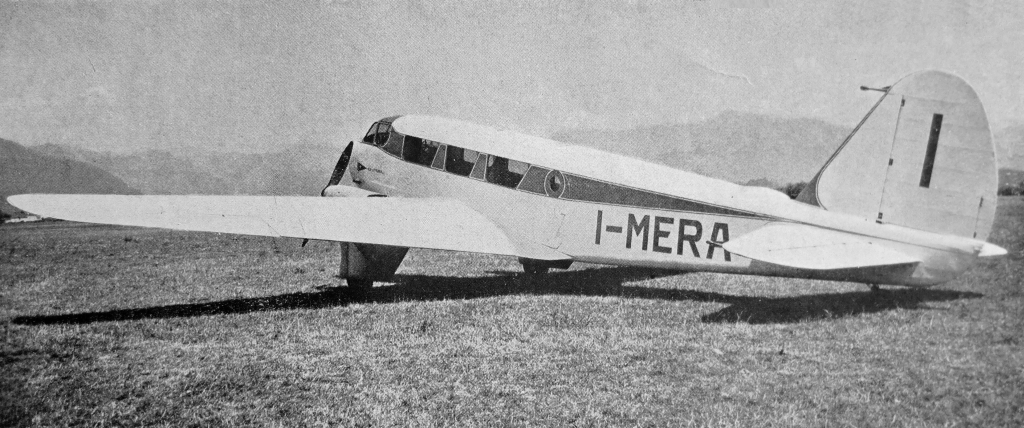

General information
- Type: Airliner
- Manufacturer: Caproni
- Primary user: Ala Littoria
- Number built: 8

History
- First flight: 1935

The Caproni Ca.308 Borea ("North Wind") was a small airliner built in Italy in the mid-1930s.

== Development ==
The Ca.308 was a streamlined, low-wing cantilevered monoplane design of conventional configuration. Its undercarriage was not retractable. The mainwheels were fitted with spats.

The prototype, designated Ca.306, was exhibited at the Milan Exhibition of 1935.

The basic design of the Ca.308 subsequently served as the basis for a large family of military aircraft, beginning with the Caproni Ca.309.

== Operational history ==
The Italian airline Ala Littoria ordered five examples.

The Italian government ordered two aircraft for general-purpose use by its colonial administration in Libya.

All these aircraft received the Ca.308 designation.

== Variants ==
Ca 306
The prototype, exhibited at the Milan Exhibition of 1935.
Ca 308 Borea
Production aircraft, Seven built.

== Operators ==
Kingdom of Italy

- Ala Littoria
- Regia Aeronautica

Italy

- Aeronautica Militare Italiana

== Specifications (Ca.308) ==
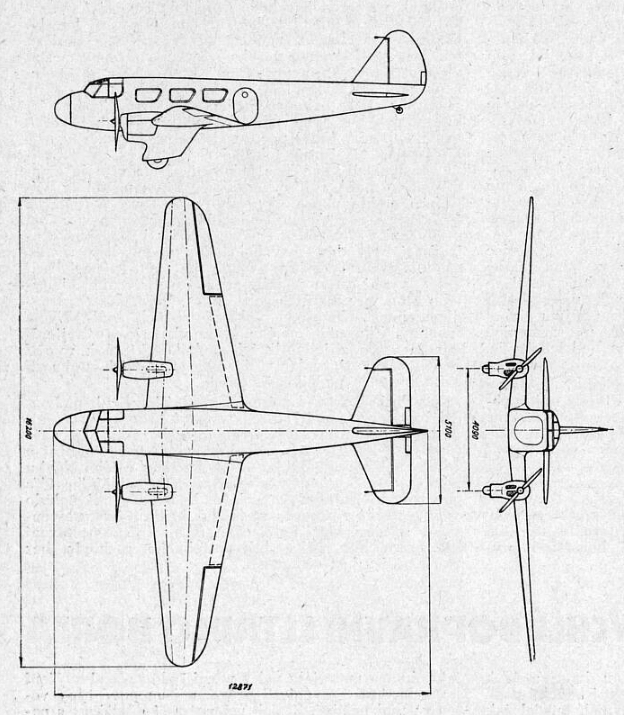
Caproni Ca. 308 Borea (Letectví, November 1935)

Data from European Transport Aircraft since 1910

General characteristics

- Crew: 3
- Capacity: 7 passengers
- Length: 12.87 m (42 ft 3 in)
- Wingspan: 16.20 m (53 ft 2 in)
- Height: 3.25 m (10 ft 8 in)
- Wing area: 38.4 m^{2} (413 sq ft)
- Empty weight: 1,700 kg (3,748 lb)
- Gross weight: 2,600–2,700 kg (5,732–5,952 lb)
- Powerplant: 2 × de Havilland Gipsy Six six-cylinder inline engine, 150 kW (200 hp) each

Performance

- Maximum speed: 246 km/h (153 mph, 133 kn)
- Cruise speed: 210 km/h (130 mph, 110 kn)
- Range: 1,200 km (750 mi, 650 nmi)
- Service ceiling: 5,000 m (16,000 ft)
- Rate of climb: 4.30 m/s (846 ft/min)
