= Caproni Ca.90 =

1929 Italian prototype heavy bomber

Caproni Ca 90
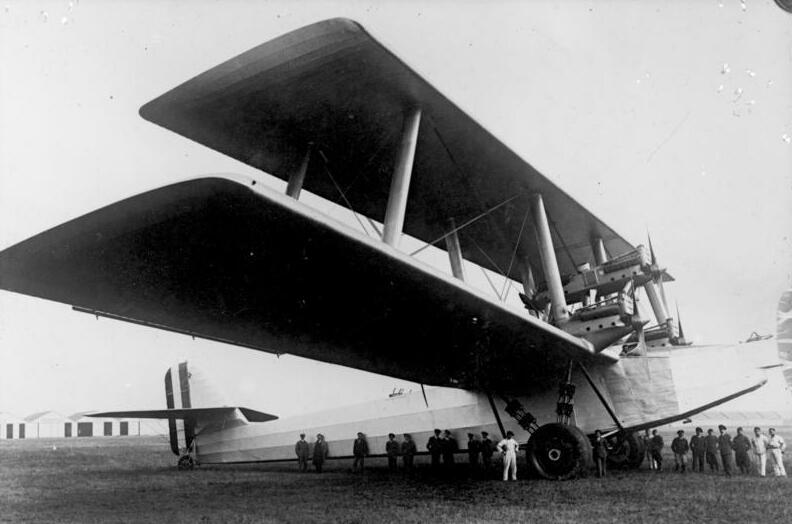

General information
- Type: Heavy bomber
- National origin: Italy
- Manufacturer: Caproni
- Number built: 1

History
- First flight: 13 October 1929

The Caproni Ca.90 was a prototype heavy bomber designed and built by the Italian aircraft manufacturer Caproni. At the time of its maiden flight on 13 October 1929, it was the largest land-based aircraft then extant in the world; the First World War-era Siemens-Schuckert R.VIII having been slightly larger. Only one Ca.90 was ever built.

Although the Dornier Do X flying boat that flew later that same year had a larger wingspan and weight, the Ca.90 remained the largest land plane until the arrival of the Tupolev ANT-20 in 1934.

== Design and development ==
The Caproni Ca.90 was a six-engined inverted sesquiplane designed for use as a heavy bomber. In terms of its construction, the plane was primarily composed of steel tubing, which possessed greater strength and elasticity than either aluminium or duralumin, while the main joints were machined from billets of chrome-nickel steel. The majority of the fuselage and the wings were covered with a simplistic doped fabric; however, the forward portion had corrugated duralumin sheeting instead. Extensive testing of all elements of the aircraft was carried out at the experimental department of the Polytechnic University of Milan.

The aircraft had a large square-section fuselage that was suspended from the lower wing as well as forming a portion of its central section. The bow was outfitted with a turret that was armed with a machine gun; directly behind the turret was a sizable fuel tank, above which was the flight deck from where the pilot flew the aircraft. Aft of this compartment were several more fuel tanks and the bomb bay. The bombracks were capable of carrying various sizes (800 kg, 500 kg, 250 kg, and 100 kg) of bombs for a total of 8,000 kg of explosives over a normal mission range. Towards the rear of the fuselage were additional defensive positions which were intended to provide heavy fire across all directions. A total of seven machine guns were normally equipped.

The Ca.90 was powered by an arrangement of six Isotta Fraschini Asso 1000 W-18 piston engines. Specifically, it had two tandem pairs of engines mounted above the lower wing, each pair driving a four-bladed pusher and a two-bladed tractor propeller, while the final pair of engines was mounted above the fuselage. The Asso 1000 engines were among the most powerful available at that time; though they achieved only a moderate power-to-weight ratio, they were relatively fuel-efficient. They were water-cooled, and the pilot could control the air flow to the radiators to regulate them. Copious amounts of fuel were stored in both the wings and fuselage. Caproni stated that an excessive number of engines undermined both simplicity and safety by increasing control difficulties. During the flight test programme, it was speculated that future engines capable of generating up to 2,000 hp would permit the number fitted to the Ca.90 to be reduced to as few as three.

The wings of the Ca.90 were particularly large for the era. A monoplane tail unit was used, which was fitted with balanced control surfaces. The rudder's balanced surface also performed mid-flight corrections for the vertical fin. The aircraft was outfitted with a relatively wide-track undercarriage, which facilitated movements across rough terrain. It comprised two independent pairs of large wheels mounted on ball bearings and furnished with oleo-rubber type springs. A tail wheel was also present, fitted underneath the rear terminal member of the fuselage.

The Ca.90 was hailed as a technological triumph of the era, having demonstrated, among other things, that land planes could reach large dimensions without necessarily increasing the difficulty of taking off or landing. In fact, the controllability of the Ca.90 did not substantially differ from that of smaller aircraft despite its exceptional size and weight; during its trials, the aircraft was regularly piloted by a single person. This outcome can be at least in part attributed to a series of careful studies conducted as well as the adoption of special balancing surfaces across the various flight controls to permit the pilot to operate the aircraft without incurring undue levels of fatigue. Furthermore, all of the instrumentation and various controls, such as of the engines, had been intentionally organised for the pilot's ease of use. The flight controls were typically actuated using steel cables. The flight deck was outfitted with dual flying controls and various other provisions for a second pilot.

The Ca.90 demonstrated that large land-based aircraft could possess considerable advantages over a comparably sized flying boat, particularly in terms of its weight; while the flying boat necessitated the use of a complex and heavy hull to withstand rough seas and the considerable stresses involved in its interactions with water, land planes could be built with a comparatively simpler and lighter fuselage, their lowered weight translated into a larger useful payload capacity for the same engine power. Land-based operations would also be less troubled by certain weather phenomenon; flying boat operations were frequently postponed due to rough seas. Despite these conclusions, it was also speculated that relatively few modifications to the fuselage would be needed to form a sturdy water-tight hull, and thus permit the Ca.90 to alight on either land or water.

In the bomber role, the Ca.90 had an effective radius of action of 2,000 km (1243 ml.) while carrying 8,000 kg (17,600 lb.) of bombs. Furthermore, it was promoted as being ready to repel attacks by hostile pursuit aircraft, its structure being fairly tolerant to battle damage, and capable of attacking distant targets without an escort. It was suggested that the aircraft could be readily adapted for other purposes, including the carriage of passengers, air mail, and freight within its large fuselage; as an airliner, it would be capable of lengthy nonstop flights, potentially flying Transatlantic routes, albeit with a reduced payload capacity in order to carry enough fuel to do so. The scale of the Ca.90 was such that the aircraft became a matter of national prestige for Italy's aeronautical industry as well as for Caproni and the wider Italian nation.

== Specifications ==

Data from Illustrated Encyclopedia of Aircraft, National Advisory Committee for Aeronautics

General characteristics

- Length: 26.95 m (88 ft 5 in)
- Upper wingspan: 34.90 m (114 ft 6 in)
- Lower wingspan: 46.60 m (152 ft 11 in)
- Height: 10.80 m (35 ft 5 in)
- Wing area: 496.60 m^{2} (5,345.4 sq ft)
- Empty weight: 15,000 kg (33,069 lb)
- Max takeoff weight: 30,000 kg (66,139 lb)
- Powerplant: 6 × Isotta Fraschini Asso 1000 water-cooled W-18 piston engines, 750 kW (1,000 hp) each

Performance

- Maximum speed: 205 km/h (127 mph, 111 kn)
- Range: 1,290 km (800 mi, 700 nmi)
- Endurance: 7 hours
- Service ceiling: 4,500 m (14,700 ft)

Armament

- Guns: 12 defensive machine-guns
- Bombs: 8,000 kg (18,000 lb)

== Appearances in media ==
The Ca.90 has appeared in animated form in the Studio Ghibli film The Wind Rises. It makes its appearance in a dream sequence where Jiro Horikoshi has a meaningful meeting and conversation with his inspiration, Count Caproni.

== See also ==
- Beardmore Inflexible
