= Giovanni Battista Caproni =

Italian aircraft designer (1886-1957)

Count Giovanni Battista Caproni
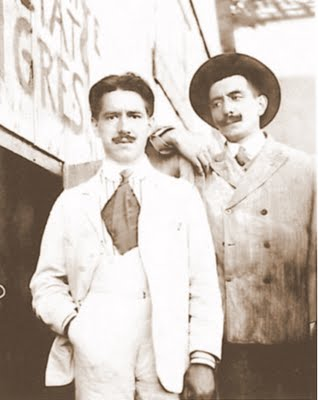
- Giovanni Caproni (left) poses with his brother, early 20th century
- Born: July 3, 1886; Massone d'Arco, Austria-Hungary
- Died: October 27, 1957 (aged 71); Rome, Italy
- Education: Technical University of Munich (diplom); University of Liège Dr. Ing
- Occupations: Aeronautical engineer; electrical engineer; civil engineer; aircraft designer
- Years active: 1907–c. 1950

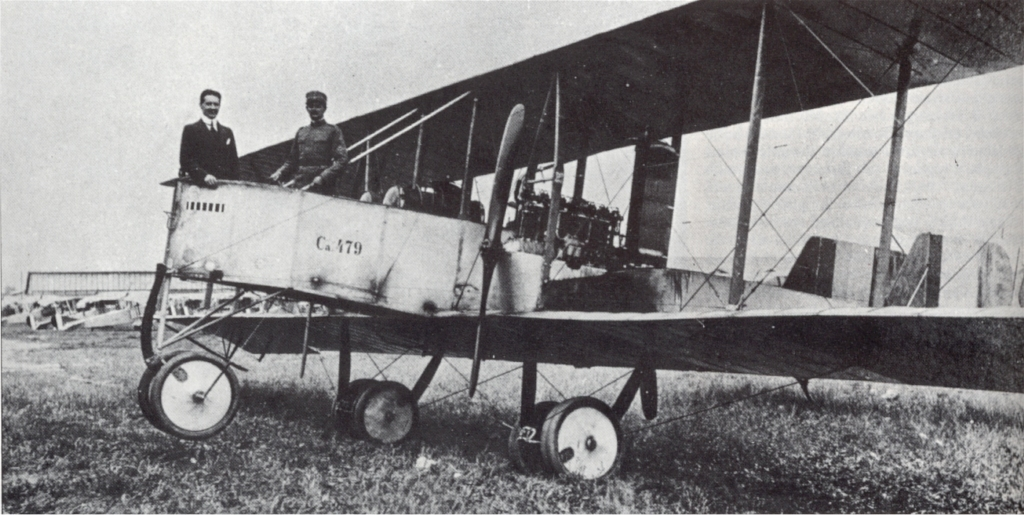
Giovanni Caproni (on the left) on board the second Caproni Ca.32 at Taliedo airport in July 1915.

Giovanni Battista "Gianni" Caproni, 1st Count of Taliedo (July 3, 1886 – October 27, 1957) was an Italian aeronautical engineer, civil engineer, electrical engineer, and aircraft designer who founded the Caproni aircraft-manufacturing company.

== Early life and education ==
Caproni was born on July 3, 1886, in Massone, which at the time was in Austria-Hungary but became a part of Italy in 1919. In 1907 he received a degree in civil engineering from the Technical University of Munich. A year later he received a doctoral degree in electrical engineering from the University of Liège.

== Career ==
In 1907 and 1908, Caproni gained experience in the construction of aircraft engines; he also collaborated with the Romanian aircraft designer Henri Coandă, whom he had met at l'Istituto Montefiori di Liegi, in the building of sailplanes. In 1908, he founded the Caproni factory in the Taliedo district of Milan, Italy, to manufacture biplanes. In 1909 he opened an industrial airport near the Cascina Malpensa – today's Milan–Malpensa Airport – to manufacture and test his aircraft. In 1910, he designed and built his first powered aircraft, the Caproni Ca. 1, an experimental biplane which was the first aircraft built in Italy. It was destroyed during its first flight on May 27, 1910.

In 1911, the year his company was named Società de Agostini e Caproni, he switched to monoplane construction, in which he had greater success. In 1914, he tested Italy's first multi-engined aircraft, a three-engine biplane later dubbed the Caproni Ca.31 . After Italy entered World War I in 1915, he devoted his efforts to designing and constructing bombers. His company later was renamed Società Caproni e Comitti.

Caproni was an early proponent of the development of passenger aircraft, and developed a variant of the Ca.4 bomber into the Ca.48 airliner. Although it made a very favorable impression on the public when first displayed, the Ca.48 probably never entered airline service, and on August 2, 1919, a Ca.48 crashed near Verona, Italy, killing everyone on board (14, 15, or 17 people, according to various sources) in Italy's first commercial aviation disaster and one of the earliest – and, at the time, the deadliest – airliner accidents in history. In 1921, he built the prototype of a giant transatlantic passenger seaplane, the Caproni Ca.60 Noviplano, with a capacity of 100 passengers, but it proved unstable and crashed on its second flight. He also designed gliders.

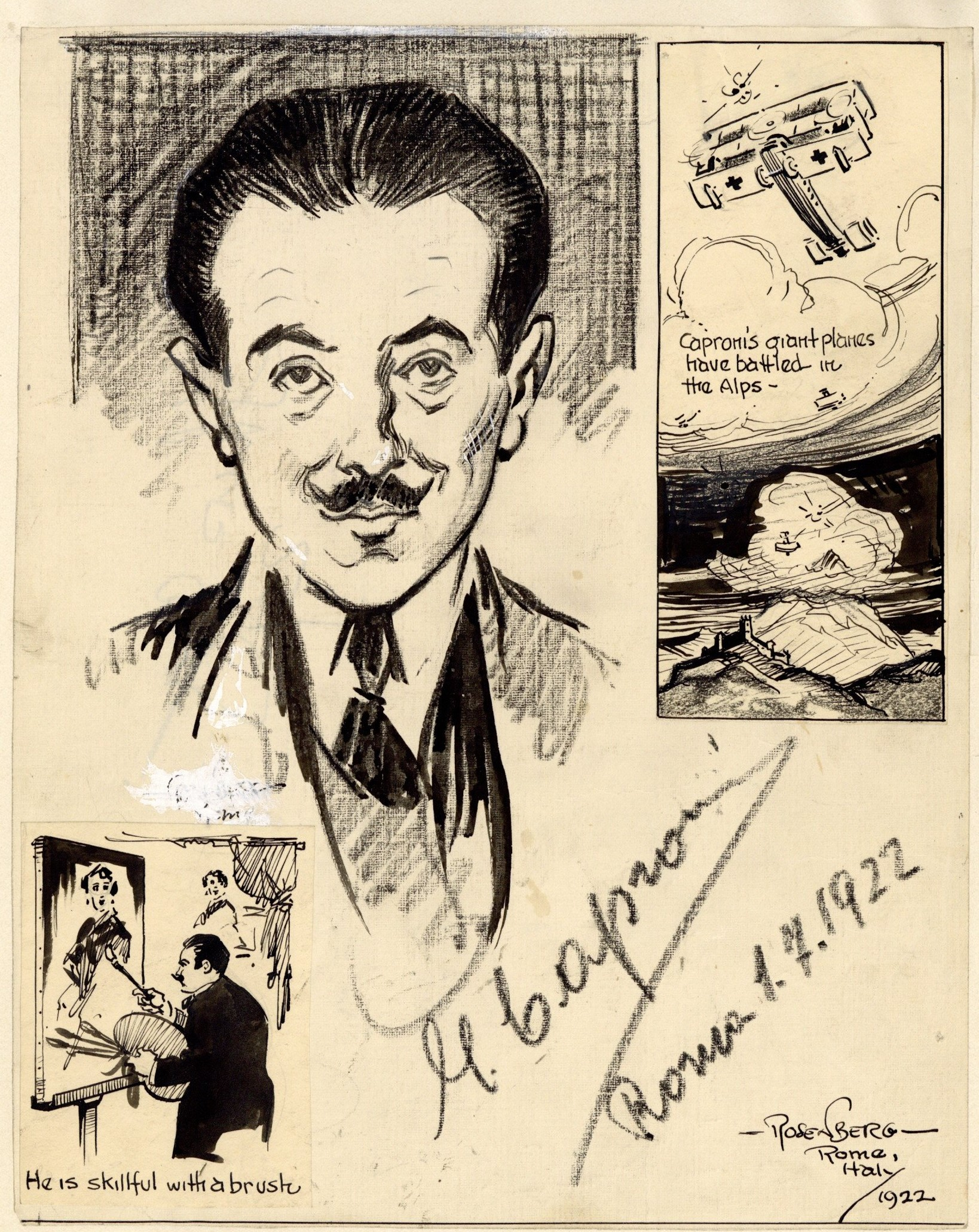
Giovanni Caproni autographed drawings by Manuel Rosenberg from Rome, Italy 1922 for the Cincinnati Post

Between World War I and World War II, he devoted most of his effort to the design and production of bombers and light transport aircraft, and his company manufactured the early Stipa-Caproni and Caproni Campini N.1, the ducted fan experimental aircraft which were precursors of true jet aircraft. During this period, his company became Società Italiana Caproni, a major conglomerate which purchased other manufacturers, creating subsidiaries which included Caproni Bergamasca and Caproni Vizzola, although the assertion that Caproni also purchased the Reggiane company to form a "Caproni Reggiane" subsidiary is a myth. Caproni was granted the title Conte di Taliedo (Count of Taliedo, or Earl of Taliedo) during the interwar period.

The Caproni company produced aircraft for the Regia Aeronautica (Italian Royal Air Force) during World War II – primarily bombers, transports, seaplanes, and trainers, although the Caproni Vizzola subsidiary also built several fighter prototypes.

The Società Italiana Caproni conglomerate ceased operations in 1950, although its last vestige, the Caproni Vizzola subsidiary, survived until 1983.

== Death and legacy ==
Caproni died in Rome on October 27, 1957. His remains were transferred to his hometown of Massone where he was buried in the Caproni family grave.

In 1983, Caproni was inducted into the International Air & Space Hall of Fame at the San Diego Air & Space Museum.

In the 2013 Japanese anime film The Wind Rises, a fictionalized version of him interacts with the protagonist, Jiro Horikoshi, in dream sequences.

== See also ==
- Gianni Caproni Museum of Aeronautics
- The Wind Rises, a 2013 film in which Caproni is a character
