= Caproni =

Former Italian aircraft manufacturer

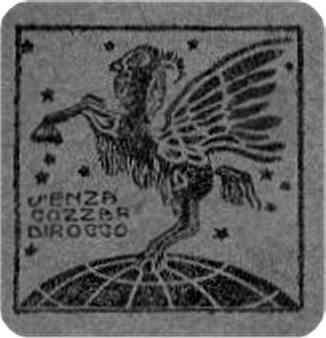
- Industry: Aerospace
- Founded: 1908; 118 years ago
- Defunct: 1950; 76 years ago
- Fate: Incorporated into Agusta
- Headquarters: Italy
- Products: Transport aircraft Bombers; Experimental planes Military trainers Seaplanes
- Subsidiaries: Caproni Bergamasca; Caproni Vizzola; Reggiane; Isotta Fraschini

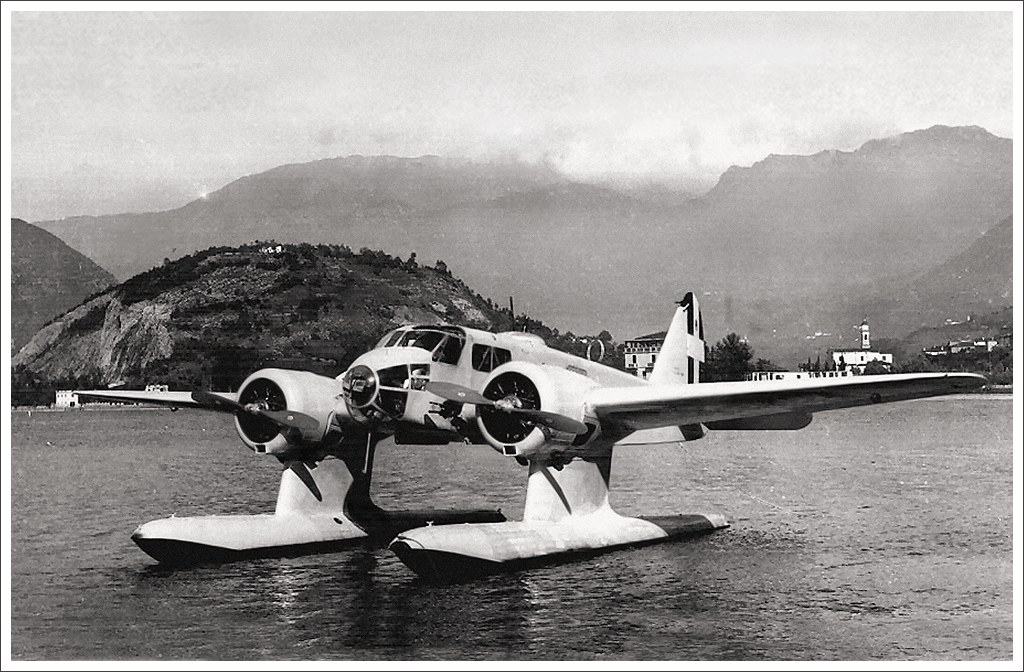
Caproni Ca.316 seaplane at its moorings.

Caproni, also known as Società de Agostini e Caproni and Società Caproni e Comitti, was an Italian aircraft manufacturer. Its main base of operations was at Taliedo, near Linate Airport, on the outskirts of Milan.

Founded by Giovanni Battista "Gianni" Caproni during 1908, the company produced several successful heavy bombers during the First World War. Following the acquisition of several other aviation firms throughout the interwar period, Caproni transformed into a sizable aviation-orientated syndicate, the Società Italiana Caproni, Milano. The majority of its aircraft were bombers and transport aircraft. It played a pioneering role in the development of the Caproni Campini N.1, an experimental aircraft powered by a thermo-jet. It provided large numbers of combat aircraft for the Axis during the Second World War. The firm did not prosper in the postwar era and the Società Italiana Caproni went out of business in 1950. Many of the company's former assets were subsequently acquired by the Italian helicopter specialist Agusta.

== History ==
The company was founded during 1908 by the Italian aviation pioneer and aeronautical engineer Giovanni Battista "Gianni" Caproni. It was initially named, from 1911, Società de Agostini e Caproni, then Società Caproni e Comitti. Caproni was responsible for completing the first aircraft of Italian construction in 1911. Its principal manufacturing facilities were based in Taliedo, a peripheral district of Milan, close to Linate Airport, while the firm's Caproni Vizzola division was based in Vizzola Ticino, close to Milan–Malpensa Airport.

The firm initially produced a series of small single-engine aircraft, including the Caproni Ca.1, Ca.6 and Ca.12; these became important milestones in the early development of Italian aviation. As such, Caproni became one of the most important Allied aircraft manufacturers during the First World War, being responsible for the design and manufacture of large, multi-engine long-range bombers, such as the three-engined Caproni Ca.32, Ca.33, Ca.36 and Ca.40. These aircraft were adopted not only by the Italian military, but by the French as well. Caproni's bombers were a significant contribution in the development of heavy aircraft. Following the end of the conflict, the strategic bombing theories of Giulio Douhet were reputedly shaped by the operational use of Caproni bombers, and thus have been was seen as an important landmark in the history of aviation.

The Interwar period was a busy one for Caproni. The end of the First World War led to a rapid decrease in demand for bombers, impacting orders for much of Caproni's traditional product line and the company redirected its resources towards the growing civil aviation market. It reorganised into a large syndicate, which was named the Società Italiana Caproni, Milano, as a result of having acquired several smaller Italian manufacturers. By the 1930s, the company's main subdivisions comprised Caproni Bergamasca, Caproni Vizzola, Reggiane and the engine manufacturer Isotta Fraschini. Caproni's aircraft activity largely orientated towards the production of bombers and light transport aircraft.

Perhaps the most distinctive of Caproni's aircraft was the Caproni Ca.60 Transaereo, an experimental large flying boat designed for the civil sector. At the time, the concept of a large multi-engined flying boat to serve long-distance passenger routes was considered to be radical. Caproni believed that such an aircraft could allow travel to remote areas more quickly than ground or water transport, and that the investment required to develop and manufacturer such an aircraft would be less expensive than pursuing alternatives. During 1919, Caproni filed to patent his work on the concept. His large seaplane design, designated Caproni Ca.60, was highly unorthodox, featuring eight engines and three sets of triple wings. On 12 February or 2 March 1921, (Note: Alegi & August 2006, p. 23 cites 12 February 1921 as the date of the Transaereo's maiden flight, but at p. 24 the same source considers the pause between this flight and the next inexplicable. Instead the Gianni Caproni Museum of Aeronautics, in the text of an explanatory panel, cites 2 March 1921 as the date of the maiden flight.) it took off for the first time, proving to be both stable and maneuverable during its brief flight, in spite of a persisting tendency to climb. On March 4, the sole completed aircraft was lost while attempting its second flight.

During 1927, the Caproni Museum (Italian: Museo Caproni) was established in Taliedo by Giovanni Caproni and his wife, Timina Caproni. It is both the oldest aviation museum in Italy, as well as the country's oldest corporate museum. The Caproni Museum has long outlived the Caproni company itself.

Caproni continued to maintain its interest in innovative aircraft. The Stipa-Caproni, also known as the Caproni Stipa, was designed by Luigi Stipa and built by Caproni during the early 1930s. The aircraft featured a hollow, barrel-shaped fuselage with the engine and propeller enclosed by the fuselage, effectively forming a single ducted fan. Flight testing found that the approach induced significant aerodynamic drag, cancelling out much of the gains in engine efficiency and reducing the aircraft's top speed to 131 km/h (81 mph). Some authors have claimed that its design influenced the development of jet propulsion.

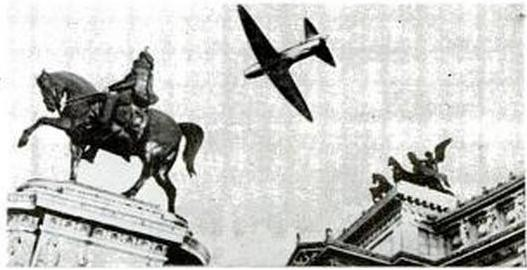
The Caproni Campini N.1 overflying Piazza Venezia, Rome

During the 1930s, Caproni became involved with the Italian aeronautics engineer Secondo Campini, who was engaged in pioneering research into jet propulsion, having proposed adopting a so-called thermo-jet to power an aircraft. Campini had been issued with an initial contract from the Italian government to develop and manufacture his engine. During 1934, the Regia Aeronautica (the Italian Air Force) granted its approval to proceed with the production of a pair of jet-powered prototype aircraft; Caproni was engaged to manufacture this aircraft, which was thus designated as the Caproni Campini N.1, with Campini providing technical guidance while specialising in the engine's design.

On 27 August 1940, the maiden flight of the experimental N.1 occurred at Caproni's Taliedo facility. On 30 November 1941, the second prototype was flown from Milan's Linate Airport to Rome's Guidonia Airport, in a highly publicised event that included a fly-past over Rome and a reception with Italian Prime Minister Benito Mussolini. According to the historian Nathanial Edwards, the practicality of the N.1 design had been undermined by political pressure to speed the programme along so that Italy would be more likely to be the first country in the world to perform a jet-powered flight. According to economics author Harrison Mark, Soviet aircraft design bureau TsAGI obtained details on the N.1 programme and were encouraged to work on a similar design; as such, there is a basis for stating that the design of the N.1 influenced subsequent early jet aircraft.

The early years of the postwar era was one of considerable hardship for Caproni and the wider Italian aviation industry alike. During 1950, the Società Italiana Caproni ceased to exist. However, one of the company's former divisions, Caproni Vizzola, lasted until 1983, when it was acquired by the Italian helicopter manufacturer Agusta.

== Aircraft ==
From

=== Pre-World War I ===
- Caproni Ca.1 of 1910 – Experimental biplane

=== World War I ===
- Caproni Ca.1 of 1914 – Heavy bomber
- Caproni Ca.2 – Heavy bomber
- Caproni Ca.3 – Heavy bomber
- Caproni Ca.4 – Heavy bomber
- Caproni Ca.5 – Heavy bomber
- Caproni Ca.14 - biplane
- Caproni Ca.15 - monoplane
- Caproni Ca.17 - monoplane
- Caproni Ca.18 – Observation plane
- Caproni Ca.19 - monoplane
- Caproni Ca.20 – Monoplane fighter
- Caproni Ca.21 - reconnaissance aircraft
- Caproni Ca.22 – Variable incidence research parasol monoplane
- Caproni Ca.26 - project
- Caproni Ca.27 - project
- Caproni Ca.28 - project
- Caproni Ca.29 - project
- Caproni Ca.31 – Modified Ca.1
- Caproni Ca.32 – Modified Italian Army version of Ca.1

=== Inter-war period ===
- Caproni Ca.30 – Postwar redesignation of 1914 Ca.1
- Caproni Ca.33 – Postwar redesignation of Ca.3
- Caproni Ca.34 – Postwar redesignation of proposed modified Ca.3
- Caproni Ca.35 – Postwar redesignation of proposed modified Ca.3
- Caproni Ca.36 – Postwar redesignation of modified Ca.3
- Caproni Ca.37 – Postwar redesignation of prototype ground-attack version of Ca.3
- Caproni Ca.39 – Postwar redesignation of proposed seaplane version of Ca.3
- Caproni Ca.40 – Postwar redesignation of Ca.4 prototype
- Caproni Ca.41 – Postwar redesignation of Ca.4 variant
- Caproni Ca.42 – Postwar redesignation of Ca.4 variant
- Caproni Ca.43 – Postwar redesignation of floatplane variant of Ca.4
- Caproni Ca.44 – Postwar redesignation of Ca.5 heavy bomber
- Caproni Ca.45 – Postwar redesignation of Ca.5 aircraft built for France
- Caproni Ca.46 – Postwar redesignation of Ca.5 variant
- Caproni Ca.47 – Postwar redesignation of seaplane version of Ca.5
- Caproni Ca.48 – Airliner version of Ca.4
- Caproni Ca.49 – Proposed seaplane airliner of 1919
- Caproni Ca.50 – Air ambulance version of Ca.44
- Caproni Ca.51 – Postwar redesignation of prototype of enlarged Ca.4
- Caproni Ca.52 – Postwar redesignation for Ca.4 aircraft built for Royal Naval Air Service
- Caproni Ca.56 – Airliner version of Ca.1
- Caproni Ca.57 – Airliner version of Ca.44
- Caproni Ca.58 – Postwar redesignation for re-engined Ca.4s
- Caproni Ca.59 – Postwar redesignation for exported Ca.58s
- Caproni Ca.60 Noviplano – Flying boat airliner prototype
- Caproni Ca.64 - fighter project
- Caproni Ca.65 - fighter project
- Caproni Ca.66 - Four-engine, single-fuselage bomber of 1922
- Caproni Ca.68 - reconnaissance flying boat project
- Caproni Ca.69 - reconnaissance flying boat project
- Caproni Ca.70 – Prototype night fighter of 1925
- Caproni Ca.71 – Ca.70 variant of 1927
- Caproni Ca.73 – Airliner and light bomber
- Caproni Ca.74 – Re-engined Ca.73 light bomber
- Caproni Ca.75 - biplane bomber project
- Caproni Ca.76 - biplane bomber project
- Caproni Ca.77 - biplane bomber project
- Caproni Ca.78 - biplane bomber project
- Caproni Ca.80 – Later redesignation of Ca.74
- Caproni Ca.81 - reconnaissance monoplane project
- Caproni Ca.82 – Redesignation of Ca.73ter variant
- Caproni Ca.83 - monoplane fighter
- Caproni Ca.84 - biplane flying boat project
- Caproni Ca.85 - biplane flying boat project
- Caproni Ca.86 - biplane flying boat project
- Caproni Ca.88 – Redesignation of Ca.73quarter variant
- Caproni Ca.89 – Redesignation of Ca.73quarterG variant
- Caproni Ca.90 – Heavy bomber aircraft
- Caproni Ca.92 - reconnaissance biplane project
- Caproni Ca.93 - biplane bomber project
- Caproni Ca.94 - 4-engine monoplane heavy bomber
- Caproni Ca.95 - Heavy bomber aircraft, 1933
- Caproni Ca.96 - 4-engine biplane heavy bomber project
- Caproni Ca.97 – Civil utility aircraft
- Caproni Ca.98 - monoplane tourer
- Caproni Ca.99 - biplane tourer
- Caproni Ca.100 – Trainer
- Caproni Ca.101 – Airliner, transport, and bomber
- Caproni Ca.102 – Re-engined Ca.101
- Caproni Ca.106 - civil biplane project
- Caproni Ca.107 - biplane fighter project
- Caproni Ca.108 - mailplane project
- Caproni Ca.109 - 2-seat biplane sport/trainer
- Caproni Ca.110 - biplane fighter project
- Caproni Ca.111 – Reconnaissance aircraft and light bomber
- Caproni Ca.113 – Advanced trainer
- Caproni Ca.114 – Biplane fighter
- Caproni Ca.115 - twin-engined sesquiplane bomber project
- Caproni Ca.116 - sports biplane project
- Caproni Ca.117 - experimental high-altitude monoplane project
- Caproni Ca.118 - twin-engine monoplane bomber project
- Caproni Ca.119 - reconnaissance biplane project
- Caproni Ca.121 - fast monoplane bomber project
- Caproni Ca.122 – Prototype bomber and transport
- Caproni Ca.123 – Proposed airliner version of Ca.122
- Caproni Ca.124 – Reconnaissance and bomber floatplane
- Caproni Ca.125 – Two-seat touring biplane
- Caproni Ca.126 - monoplane sports aircraft project
- Caproni Ca.128 - low-wing metal monoplane 1+4 feederliner project
- Caproni Ca.129 - low-wing metal monoplane 1+4 feederliner project
- Caproni Ca.130 - trimotor transport, precursor of Caproni Ca.133
- Caproni Ca.132 – Prototype bomber and airliner
- Caproni Ca.134 – Reconnaissance biplane
- Caproni Ca.150 - twin-boom attack fighter
- Caproni Ca.153 - monoplane heavy fighter project
- Caproni Ca.154 - twin-engine monoplane heavy fighter project
- Caproni Ca.155 - twin-engine monoplane heavy fighter project
- Caproni Ca.156 - twin-engined heavy fighter project
- Caproni Ca.161 – High-altitude experimental aircraft
- Caproni Ca.162 - recce-fighter project
- Caproni Ca.163 – Prototype of Ca.164
- Caproni Ca.165 – Prototype fighter of 1938
- Caproni Ca.204 - long-range bomber project
- Caproni Ca.211 - three-engine long-range bomber project
- Caproni Ca.201 - high altitude bomber project
- Caproni Ca.205 - long-range bomber project
- Caproni Ca.214 - aerobatic trainer project
- Caproni Ca.301 – Prototype fighter
- Caproni A.P.1 – Attack aircraft derivative of Ca.301
- Caproni Ca.305 – First production version of A.P.1
- Caproni Ca.306 – Airliner prototype (1935)
- Caproni Ca.307 – Second production version of A.P.1
- Caproni Ca.308 – Export version of A.P.1 for El Salvador and Paraguay
- Caproni Ca. 308 Borea – Airliner
- Caproni Ca.309 – military light twin
- Caproni Ca.345 – recce floatplane project
- Caproni Ca.350 – Fighter-bomber, reconnaissance aircraft
- Caproni-Reggiane Ca.400 – Caproni-Reggiane-built version of Piaggio P.32 medium bomber
- Caproni Ca.401 – twin-engine recce-fighter
- Caproni Ca.405 – Caproni-built version of Piaggio P.32 medium bomber
- Caproni Ca.410 – twin-engined recce-bomber floatplane project
- Caproni CH.1 – Prototype fighter of 1935
- Caproni PS.1 – Sports aircraft
- Caproni Bergamaschi PL.3 – Long-distance racer aircraft
- Caproni-Pensuti triplane – Sports triplane of 1919
- Caproni Sauro-1 – Two-seat touring aircraft
- Caproni Vizzola F.5 – Fighter of 1939
- Stipa-Caproni – Experimental ducted-fan powered prototype of 1932

=== World War II ===
- Caproni Ca.133 – Transport and bomber
- Caproni Ca.135 – Medium bomber
- Caproni Ca.148 – Civil-military transport version of Ca.133
- Caproni Ca.164 – Trainer and liaison and reconnaissance aircraft
- Caproni Ca.309 Ghibli – Reconnaissance, ground-attack, and transport aircraft
- Caproni Ca.310 Libeccio – Reconnaissance aircraft and light bomber
- Caproni Ca.311 – Light bomber and reconnaissance aircraft
- Caproni Ca.312 – Re-engined version of Ca.310 sold to Norway
- Caproni Ca.313 – Reconnaissance bomber, trainer, and transport
- Caproni Ca.314 – Ground-attack aircraft and torpedo bomber
- Caproni Ca.316 – Seaplane
- Caproni Ca.320 - three-engine bomber
- Caproni Ca.325 – Proposed version of Ca.135 medium bomber with more powerful engines, built in mock-up form only
- Caproni Ca.330 - Project
- Caproni Ca.331 – Prototype tactical reconnaissance aircraft/light bomber (Ca.331 O.A./Ca.331A) of 1940 and prototype night fighter (Ca.331 C.N./Ca.331B) of 1942
- Caproni Ca.332 - Project; derived from Ca.330
- Caproni Ca.335 – Fighter-bomber, reconnaissance aircraft for the Belgian Air Force.
- Caproni Ca.360 - Twin engine dive bomber project
- Caproni Ca.365 - Twin engine bomber project
- Caproni Ca.370 - twin engine combat plane project
- Caproni Ca.375 - twin engine combat plane project
- Caproni Ca.380 - twin-boom fighter project
- Caproni Ca.381 - twin-boom fighter project
- Caproni Campini N.1 – Experimental motorjet-powered aircraft of 1940
- Caproni Campini Ca.183bis – unfinished prototype high-altitude fighter aircraft
- Caproni Vizzola F.4 – Fighter prototype of 1940 with German-made engine
- Caproni Vizzola F.5bis – Proposed version of F.4 with Italian-made engine
- Caproni Vizzola F.6 – Fighter prototype of 1941 (F.6M) and 1943 (F.6Z)

=== Post-World War II ===
- Caproni Ca.193 – Twin-engined six-seat monoplane
- Caproni Ca.195 - jet trainer project
- Caproni Trento F-5 – Lightweight two-seat jet trainer
- Caproni Vizzola Calif – Family of gliders (sailplanes) (A-10, A-12, A-14, A-15, A-20, A-21)
- Caproni Vizzola C22 Ventura – Light jet trainer

== See also ==
- Compagnia Nazionale Aeronautica
- Gianni Caproni Museum of Aeronautics
- Isotta Fraschini
- Reggiane

== Notes ==
=== Bibliography ===
- Abate, Rosario; Alegi, Gregory; Apostolo, Giorgio (1992). Aeroplani Caproni – Gianni Caproni ideatore e costruttore di ali italiane (in Italian). Trento, Italy: Museo Caproni.
- Alegi, Gregory (August 2006). "The castle door, the mooring pylon and the Transaereo – Part 1". WW1 Aero (193). ISSN 0736-198X.
- —— (November 2006). "The castle door, the mooring pylon and the Transaereo – Part 2". WW1 Aero (194). ISSN 0736-198X.
- Golly, John. Jet: Frank Whittle and the Invention of the Jet Engine. Datum Publishing, 1996. ISBN 1-90747-201-0.
- Grant, R. G.; Niccoli, R. (2003). Il volo – 100 anni di aviazione (in Italian). Novara, Italy: DeAgostini. ISBN 88-41809-51-5.
- Mark, Harrison. The Economics Of Coercion And Conflict. World Scientific, 2014. ISBN 9-81458-335-9.
- Nicoletti, Giovanna; Gabrielli, Luca (2007). Giovanna Nicoletti (ed.). La Collezione Caproni (in Italian). Rovereto, Italy: Stella Edizioni/Museo Tridentino di Scienze Naturali/Museo dell'Aeronautica Gianni Caproni. OCLC 799828536.
- Pavelec, Sterling Michael. The jet race and the Second World War. Praeger Security International: Westport, Connecticut. 2007. ISBN 0-275-99355-8.
