= Taliedo =

Coordinates: 45°26′49″N 9°14′54″E

- Quartiere of Milan
- Interactive map of Taliedo
- Country: Italy
- Region: Lombardy
- Province: Milan
- Comune: Milan
- Zone: 4
- Time zone: UTC+1 (CET)
  - Summer (DST): UTC+2 (CEST)

Taliedo is a peripheral district ("quartiere") of the city Milan, Italy, part of the Zone 4 administrative division, located south-east of the city centre. The informal boundaries of the district are three main city streets, respectively Via Mecenate, Via Bonfadini and Via Salomone.

Taliedo was part of the comune of Corpi Santi, which was annexed to Milan in 1873.

The area was mostly rural until the early 20th century. The district is in fact named after a cascina (i.e., a farmhouse), "Cascina Taliedo", the major of several cascine that used to exist in the area.

The urbanization of Taliedo jump started in the 1910s, when aircraft designer Giovanni Battista Caproni established a landing strip in the area. Next came the Officine Caproni, an airplane manufacturing workshop founded by Caproni, as well as the Aerodromo d'Italia, one of the first airports in Italy and the first in the Milanese area. To allow for the construction of the airport, most cascine were demolished. A tramway was created connecting Milan and Taliedo, to be used by the workers of the Officine.

The Taliedo airport was abandoned in the 1930s, and in the 1950s Officine Caproni ceased to exist. As a consequence, the district itself fell in decay.

Taliedo, and the Officine Caproni, are related to one of the few traditional "ghost stories" of the Milanese folklore, reported by journalist Domenico Porzio and other sources. According to the legend, the ghost of a man dressed in an aviator's suit used to walk by the Caproni facilities and the tramway terminus.
