= Savoia-Marchetti SM.80 =

SM.80
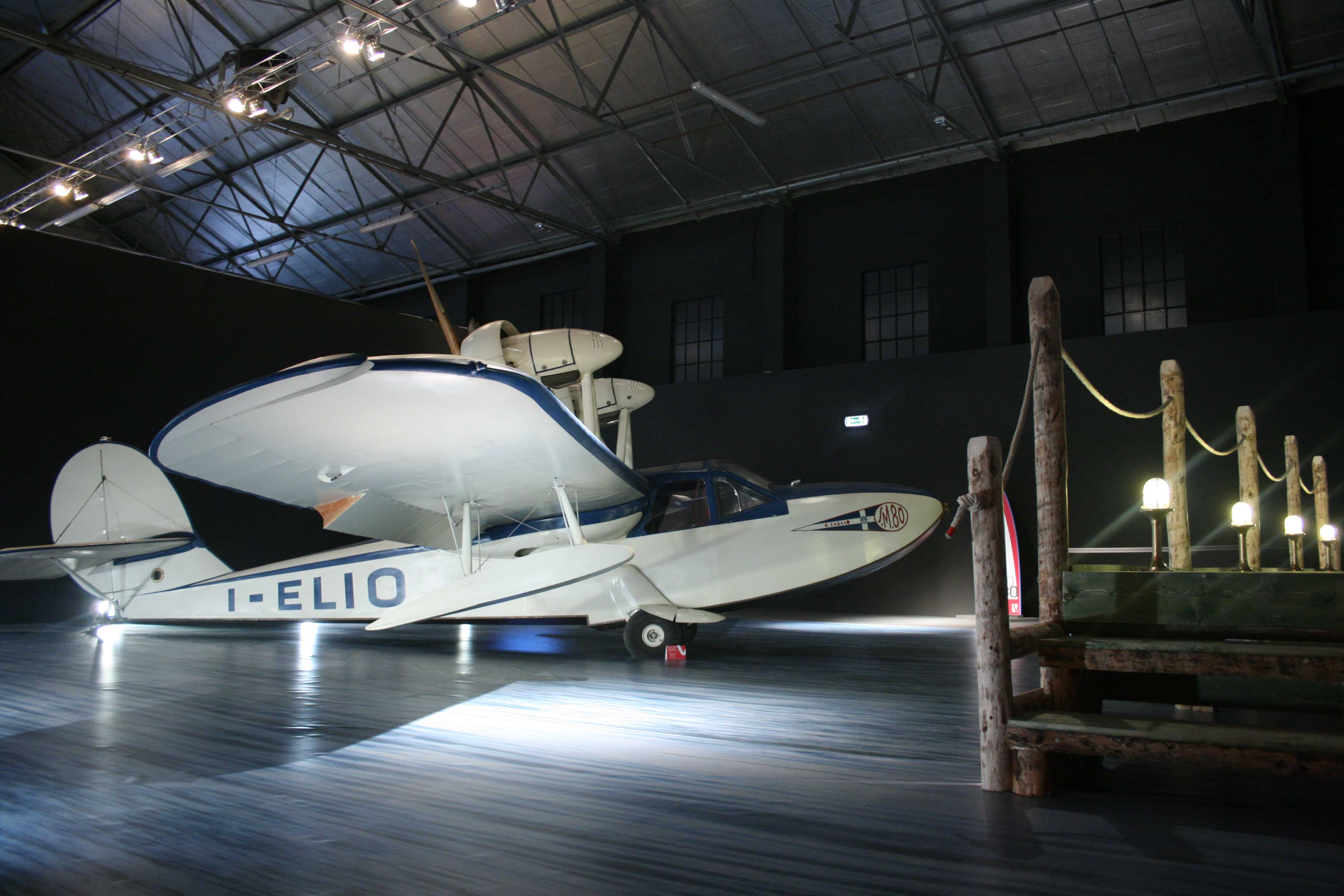
- SM.80bis at Volandia

General information
- Type: Two-four seat touring amphibious aircraft
- National origin: Italy
- Manufacturer: Savoia-Marchetti
- Number built: 4 or 5

History
- First flight: 1933

The Savoia-Marchetti SM.80 is a two-seat monoplane amphibian tourer, with a single, tractor engine mounted above the wing, designed in Italy in the early 1930s. The SM.80bis is a four-seat variant, powered by two pusher engines.

== Design and development ==
The SM.80 was a cantilever high-wing monoplane. Like the fin and tailplane, the wing was a fabric covered wooden structure, but one subdivided into sealed cells to provide buoyancy in case of hull flooding. Its tips were rounded; the fin was broad and also rounded with the tailplane, braced from below, mounted a little way above the fuselage. All control surfaces, the differential ailerons, split elevators and rounded rudder, were steel tube framed and fabric covered.

The fuselage of the SM.80 was flat sided, with a single stepped, double planked underside, copper riveted for corrosion resistance. It became slender aft. The side-by-side cockpit was set slightly into the wing leading edge and a baggage space or third seat was placed in the trailing edge. On the water, lateral stability was provided by fixed, flat bottomed floats mounted on the wing at mid-span on pairs of parallel struts. The wheeled undercarriage of the amphibian attracted contemporary notice for its neatness: the mainwheel legs were enclosed in fairings, rotated through about 180° rearwards then upwards along the fuselage sides, positioning the retracted wheels in the wing roots.

The first SM.80 was originally powered by a 112 kW (150 hp) six cylinder inline engine Alfa-Romeo built Colombo S.63 engine, mounted centrally well above the wing on a parallel pair of forward leaning N-form struts, supplemented by a transverse V-shaped bracing. The mounting struts were tubes of chrome molybdenum steel, enclosed in alloy fairings for corrosion protection. They placed the engine forward of the wing leading edge and the two blade propeller well forward of the pilot's windscreen. This aircraft was flying with the Colombo engine when it attended the Egyptian Air Rally in December 1933.

The SM.80 also flew with a 112 kW (150 hp) CNA C.VI six-cylinder in-line engine. The third aircraft, registered in 1934, was more radically re-engined; a four-seater, it was named the SM.80bis. This is powered by two pusher configuration, 56 kW (75 hp) seven-cylinder radials Pobjoy R engines, placed further aft than the single engine of the SM.80 but located above the wing on either side of the fuselage on very similar mountings. The cabin is positioned about 950 mm (2 ft) further forward but otherwise the two models were structurally identical. The SM.80bis was 80 kg (175 lb) heavier and significantly slower, with a decrease of maximum speed of (16 mph), though climb rates were similar. The speed decrease has been attributed to the extra drag of the twin engine arrangement, since the SM.80 and SM.80bis had the same overall engine power.

== Operational history ==
Apart from its Egyptian visit in late 1933, the activities of the various SM.80s are not well recorded. An exception is a fatal landing accident which the Fiat heir and Juventas chair Eduardo Agnelli died on 14 July 1935. The aircraft, the first SM.80, was owned by Giovanni Agnelli, the founder of Fiat and Eduardo's father. It seems that Eduardo was thrown forward into the propeller when the aircraft hit a floating obstacle as he was preparing to disembark. Normal cockpit access on the SM.80 was via separate forward folding windscreens for passenger and pilot.

The SM.80bis survived World War II and, re-registered, flew again after it.

== Variants ==
SM.80
Single tractor configuration Colombo S.63 or CNA C.VI 6-cylinder in-line engine. 2/3 seats.
SM.80bis
Twin pusher configuration Pobjoy R 7-cylinder radial engine. 4 seats.

== Aircraft on display ==
The SM.80bis c/n 3 and registered as I-TATI before World War II and as I-ELIO afterwards was later on static public display at the Gianni Caproni Museum of Aeronautics but has moved to Parco Museo del Volo Volandia at Vizzola Ticino.

== Specifications (SM.80, Colombo engine) ==
Data from Flight, 21 December 1934

General characteristics

- Capacity: 2
- Length: 7.80 m (25 ft 7 in)
- Wingspan: 11.0 m (36 ft 1 in)
- Height: 2.60 m (8 ft 6 in)
- Wing area: 18.0 m^{2} (194 sq ft)
- Empty weight: 700 kg (1,543 lb)
- Max takeoff weight: 1,100 kg (2,425 lb)
- Powerplant: 1 × Colombo S.63 (Alfa-Romeo) 6-cylinder air-cooled in-line, 110 kW (150 hp) maximum power
- Propellers: 2-bladed tractor mounted

Performance

- Maximum speed: 227 km/h (141 mph, 123 kn)
- Minimum control speed: 88 km/h (55 mph, 48 kn)
- Range: 1,000 km (620 mi, 540 nmi) at 200 km/h (125 mph), with normal useful load of 300 kg (661 lb), including two people and 20 kg (44 lb) baggage
- Service ceiling: 5,500 m (18,000 ft)
- Time to altitude: 20 min 19 s to 3,000 m (9,843 ft)
- Wing loading: 55.6 kg/m^{2} (11.4 lb/sq ft) at normal weight of 1,000 kg (2,205 lb)
- Power/mass: 0.097 kW/kg (0.059 hp /lb) at normal weight and cruise power of 97 kW (130 hp)
