= CNA Eta =

Eta

General information
- Type: One/two seat light aircraft
- National origin: Italy
- Manufacturer: Compagnia Nazionale Aeronautica (CNA)
- Number built: 1 or 2

History
- First flight: 1933

The CNA Eta was a single engine Italian light aircraft, flown in the mid-1930s, that set one and two seat world records as both a landplane and a seaplane. Only one or two were built.

== Design and development ==
During the 1920s the Compagnia Nazionale Aeronautica (CNA) were best known for their flying school in Rome, though they also manufactured experimental aircraft for the government. When they moved their Roman base from Cerveteri to Littorio in 1928, they built a factory in which they could produce both aircraft and aircraft engines; some were designed by other companies, some by themselves. The Eta was both CNA designed and powered.

The Eta was a conventional parasol wing light aircraft that could be configured as a single seater or with two seats in tandem; it could also be fitted with either a fixed conventional undercarriage or floats. It was originally powered by an uncowled, 9-cylinder CNA C-7 supercharged radial engine but later flew with an inverted 6-cylinder air-cooled supercharged inline, the CNA C.VI. The slightly tapered wing was mounted on tall faired parallel struts from the mid-fuselage, assisted by lighter diagonal struts and shorter, forward leaning supports from the upper fuselage. The single seat model placed the open cockpit just behind the wing trailing edge. The tail was conventional, with the tailplane on top of the fuselage and braced from below. The vertical surfaces were rounded. In keeping with the rest of the design, the fixed wheeled undercarriage was very simple, with unfaired wheels mounted on slender V-form struts attached to the lower fuselage.

== Operational history ==
The Eta was chiefly distinguished by setting three lightplane world records. At the time the FAI divided the lightest aircraft between to categories: C.II, single seats with empty weights less than 200 kg (41 lb) and C.I, two seaters weighing less than 400 kg (882 lb). These categories were then each sub-divided into landplane and seaplane. A 130 kW (170 hp) CNA C-7 engine had enabled a Fiat AS.1 to gain the Category I altitude record in December 1932 and on 6 November 1933 the single seat Eta, with the same motor and fitted with floats, set a new C.II record of 8,411 m (27.595 ft). It was then fitted with its wheeled undercarriage and flown to a new C.II landplane record of 10,008 m (32,835 ft) in December 1933. On both occasions the Eta was flown by Furio Niclot Doglio.

By 1936 the Eta was flying as a two-seat seaplane, powered by the in-line, 112 kW (150 hp) CNA C-VI engine and on 15 May it set a new world C.I 100 km (62 mi) circuit speed record of 192.62 km/h (119.7 mph), flown by Gian Giacomo Chiesi with Domenico Rossetti.

== Variants ==
It is not known if these were different aircraft or the same one modified.

Category II
single seat, CNA C-7 engine, both landplane and seaplane.
Category I
two seat, CNA C.VI engine, both landplane seaplane.

== Specifications (tandem dual control, landplane) ==
Data from Italian Civil and Military Aircraft 1930-1945

General characteristics

- Crew: 2
- Length: 6.50 m (21 ft 4 in)
- Wingspan: 10.0 m (32 ft 10 in)
- Height: 2.49 m (8 ft 2 in)
- Empty weight: 410 kg (904 lb)
- Gross weight: 500 kg (1,102 lb)
- Powerplant: 1 × CNA C-7 9-cylinder supercharged radial, 130 kW (170 hp)
- Propellers: 2-bladed

Performance

- Maximum speed: 219 km/h (136 mph, 118 kn)
- Time to altitude: 25 min to 6,457 m (19,680 ft)
- Landing speed: 65 km/h; 35 kn (40 mph)
