= Furio Niclot Doglio =

Italian test pilot

- Born: April 24, 1908
- Died: July 27, 1942 (aged 34)
- Military career
- Allegiance: Italy
- Branch: Corpo Aereo Italiano
- Rank: Capitano
- Conflicts: Malta

Furio Niclot Doglio, MOVM (24 April 1908 – 27 July 1942) was an Italian test pilot and World War II fighter pilot in the Regia Aeronautica. Doglio set nine world aviation records in the 1930s during his time as a test pilot. During the war, he claimed seven kills (six of them Spitfires), flying FIAT G. 50s and Macchi C. 202s, establishing himself as one of Italy's aces. Doglio was killed in combat on 27 July 1942 during the Siege of Malta by George Beurling, who became Canada's top ace of the war. He was awarded a Medaglia d'oro al Valor Militare alla memoria (Memorial Golden medal for military valour).

== Early life ==
Furio Niclot Doglio was born in Turin, Piedmont. He qualified as a civil pilot in 1930, having previously been an aeronautical engineer. During the early to mid-1930s, he worked as a test pilot for Italian aircraft manufacturers Compagnia Nazionale Aeronautica (CNA) and Breda and was also a flying instructor at Littorio airport, Rome.

=== Records ===
Doglio set nine official aviation world records (as recognized by the Fédération Aéronautique Internationale or FAI, the aviation world record adjudicating body).

Date	Aircraft	FAI Class	Record Event	Record
28 December 1932	Fiat AS.1	C.bis 1st category (seaplane)	Altitude	7,362 m (24,154 ft)
6 November 1933	CNA Eta	C.bis 2nd category (seaplane)	Altitude	8,411 m (27,595 ft)
24 December 1933	CNA Eta	C 2nd category (landplane)	Altitude	10,008 m (32,835 ft)
1 April 1937	Breda Ba.88	C (landplane)	Speed, given distance of 100 km (62 mi)	517.84 km/h (321.77 mph)
10 April 1937	Breda Ba.88	C (landplane)	Speed over 1,000 km (620 mi)	475.55 km/h (295.49 mph)
5 December 1937	Breda Ba.88	C (landplane)	Speed, given distance of 100 km (62 mi)	554.36 km/h (344.46 mph)
9 December 1937	Breda Ba.88	C (landplane)	Speed, closed circuit of 1,000 km (620 mi) w/ 500 kg (1,100 lb) payload	524.19 km/h (325.72 mph)
9 December 1937	Breda Ba.88	C (landplane)	Speed, closed circuit of 1,000 km (620 mi) w/ 1,000 kg (2,200 lb) payload	524.19 km/h (325.72 mph)
9 December 1937	Breda Ba.88	C (landplane)	Speed, closed circuit of 1,000 km (620 mi)	524.19 km/h (325.72 mph)

== World War II ==
When Italy entered World War II on 10 June 1940, Doglio enlisted in the Regia Aeronautica. His first posting was the 355ª Squadriglia of 21° Gruppo. On 17 June, Niclot flew his first mission: a patrol over Rome, flying the Fiat G.50.

=== Corpo Aereo Italiano ===
In autumn 1940, Doglio was in Belgium with the Corpo Aereo Italiano, the Italian air expedition against England. Niclot carried out his first mission on 27 October, by escorting a Fiat BR.20, on a mission to attack Ramsgate. During the whole campaign, Niclot, like the other Italian G.50 pilots, did not encounter enemy fighters, nor fire his guns.

=== North Africa ===
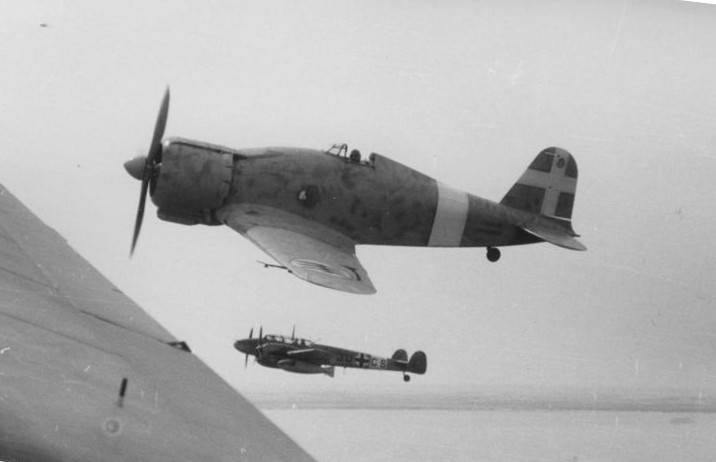
A Regia Aeronautica G.50 flying with a Luftwaffe Messerschmitt Bf 110 over North Africa in 1941. Flying this fighter, Doglio scored his first air victory against a Hawker Hurricane

Doglio's first "kill" was a Hawker Hurricane, in North Africa, while he was flying a Fiat G.50. On 30 June 1941, Captain Furio Niclot Doglio, while escorting Ju 87 Stukas that were bombing an English convoy off Ras Azzas, attacked three Hurricanes that were bouncing the dive-bombers and shot down one, damaging the others. For this action, Niclot received a Medaglia di bronzo al Valore Militare (Bronze Medal for Military Valour).

=== Malta ===
Doglio's other air victories were all claimed at Malta in July 1942, while flying the Macchi C.202, as Capitano of 151ª Squadriglia.

Macchi C.202 of Regia Aeronautica

His first Spitfire was shot down on 2 July 1942. That day, while escorting three Savoia-Marchetti SM.84, leading 10 MC.202s of 151ª Squadriglia, Doglio fought with Spitfires from 249 and 185 Squadron. During a head-on attack, he hit the Spitfire BR377 of Flight Sergeant C.S.G. De Nancrede from Squadron 249, which had to crash-land on Ta 'Qali airfield, near Mdina.

On the 6th, Doglio encountered again the Spitfires of 249 Squadron, while escorting three Cant.Z.1007 bis, and he claimed another Supermarine fighter, confirmed by his wingman Tarantola to crash north of Valletta, but the 249 that day had no losses, even if the Squadron had two aircraft shot up, one of them was flown by Sgt. Beurling, who three weeks later would kill Doglio in combat over Gozo. The following day, Niclot and seven other Macchi pilots were escorting for the first time the Ju 88A-4 of Kampfgeschwader 77. In the sky over Luqa, they clashed with seven Spitfires. Niclot and his wingman shot down the Spitfire of Flt. Sgt. D. Ferraby from Squadron 249 (AB500). Niclot's last air victory was a double "kill": two Spitfires downed on 13 July 1942.

On 27 July 1942, Doglio was leading three others Macchi, on the coast of Gozo. Six Spitfires of 126 Squadron attacked them head-on, while eight other Spitfires of 249 Sq. attacked from the left ("10 hour direction"). Niclot was preparing to counter-attack the Spitfires or 126 Sq. when his wingman, Sergente Ennio Tarantola, tried to warn his commander, waggling his wings, as Italian radios worked badly, of the Spitfires diving on them from the left, but Niclot understood that Tarantola was warning him of the Spitfires he had already spotted.

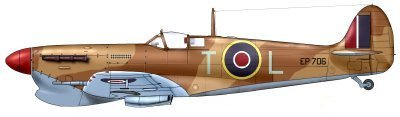
Beurling's Spitfire VC in which he shot down Doglio, on 27 July 1942

Fl. Sgt. George "Buzz" Beurling, from 249 Sq., first scored hits on Sergente Faliero Gelli's aircraft, who later crash landed on Gozo, and soon after shot down Doglio's C.202 (MM 9042), who was waggling his wings to warn his fellow pilots of Spitfires closing "head-on". "The poor devil simply blew to pieces in the air", Beurling recalled the following year, writing the book Malta Spitfire, together with journalist Leslie Roberts.

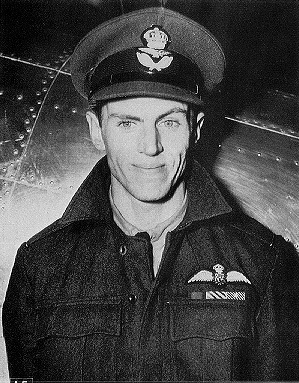
Flight Sgt. Buzz Beurling who shot down and killed Doglio.

When he was killed, Doglio held the rank of Capitano and was the commanding officer of 151ª Squadriglia, 20° Gruppo, 51° Stormo, and was flying a Macchi C.202, aircraft number 151-1. In less than a month, July 1942, Niclot had flown 21 missions of war, over Malta, was involved in 18 air combats, claimed six aircraft shot down plus four more probable and two shared with his wingman, Tarantola.

Doglio left a wife and two sons, Stefano and Gian Francesco. In via Ravenna 7A, near piazza Bologna, Rome, the house where Niclot lived with his family on the first floor, is still standing.

== Honors and tributes ==
In Rome, at the entrance of the building built by himself and his father, in via Bolzano 14, a plaque in the hall displays the citation from Doglio's Gold Medal. The citation of the Gold Medal is also on a plaque on the Bonaria cemetery of Cagliari, Sardinia, where the local section of Arma Aeronautica is dedicated to Furio Niclot Doglio. In Fiumicino, near Rome, a street in the area of Isola Sacra is named: "Niclot".

=== Awards ===
In 1936, Doglio became one of the first recipients of the FAI's Louis Blériot medal. Doglio was awarded the Medaglia d'oro al Valore Militare (MOVM) (Gold Medal for Military Valor), a Silver medal of aeronautical valour, a Silver Medal of Military Valor "on the field", two Bronze Medals and the Iron Cross, Second Class (EK II. Klasse).

== See also ==
- List of World War II aces from Italy
