= Doglio =

Doglio is a surname. Notable people with the surname include:

- Beth Doglio (born 1965), American politician
- Furio Niclot Doglio (1908–1942), Italian test pilot and World War II fighter
