= Alfa Romeo 110 =

Italian engine for aircraft use

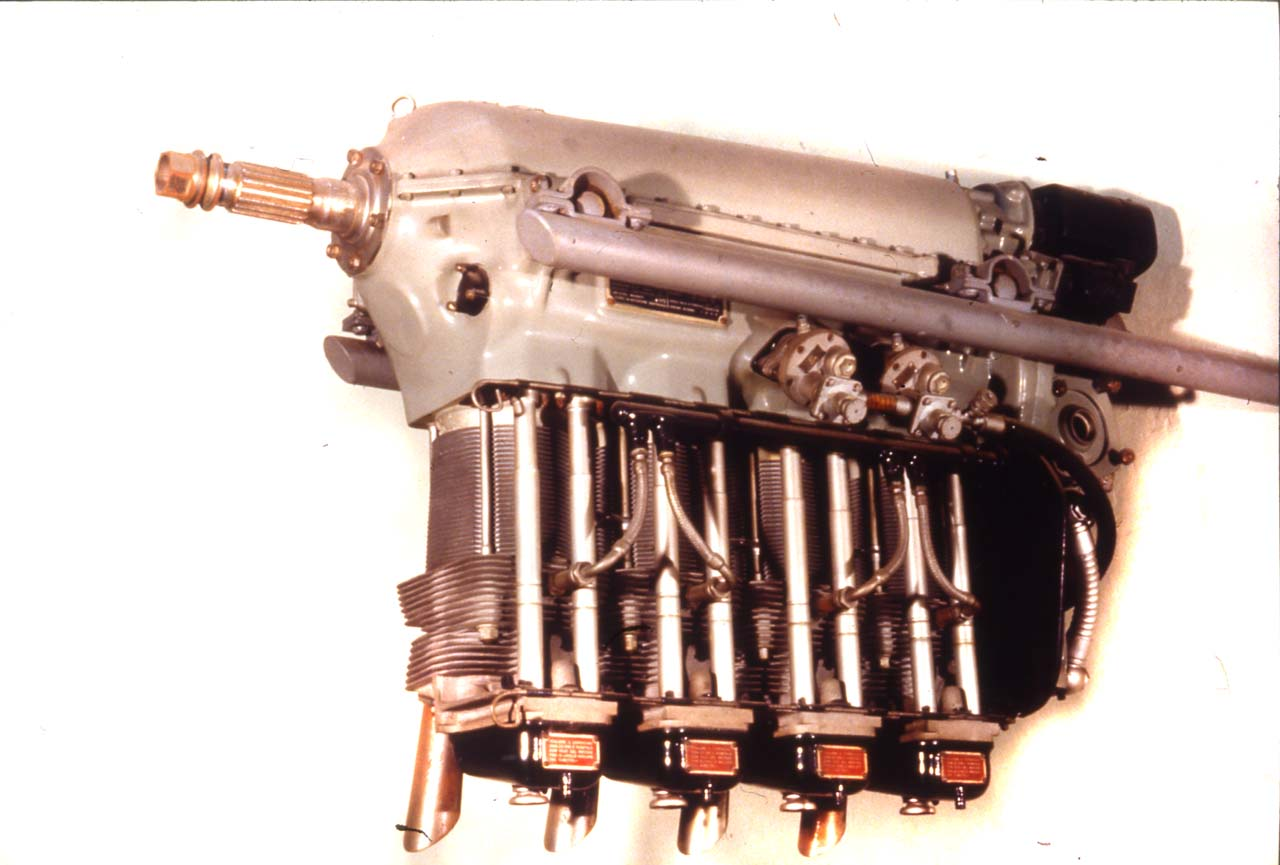
- Type: Piston aircraft engine
- Manufacturer: Alfa Romeo
- First run: 1930s
- Number built: ~500

The Alfa Romeo 110 was an Italian four-cylinder air-cooled inverted inline engine for aircraft use, mainly for trainers and light aircraft. The Alfa Romeo 110 was based on the de Havilland Gipsy Major, with approximately 500 units produced. Derivatives of the 110 include the -1, ter and Alfa Romeo 111 (possibly a mis identification of the 110-1).

== Variants ==
Alfa 110-1
97 kW (130 hp) at 2,350 rpm
Alfa 110ter
108 kW (145 hp) at 2,350 rpm
Alfa 111
116 kW (155 hp)

== Applications ==
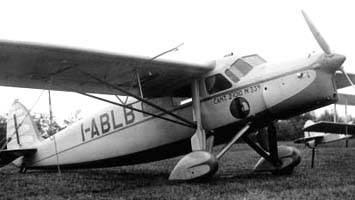
A CANT Z.1010, powered by an Alfa Romeo 110-1

- Ambrosini SAI.10
- Fiat G.2/2
- CANSA C.5B/1
- CANT Z.1010 Balilla
- CANT Z.1012
- Saiman 202
- Ambrosini S.1001 (110ter)
- Agusta CP-110 (110ter)

== Specifications (110-1) ==
Data from Jane's All The World's Aircraft 1938, Italian Civil and Military aircraft 1930–1945, and Aircraft Engines of the World 1945

=== General characteristics ===
- Type: Four-cylinder inverted air-cooled inline engine
- Bore: 118 mm (4.65 in)
- Stroke: 140 mm (5.51 in)
- Displacement: 6.125 L (373.8 cu in)
- Length: 1,642 mm (64.6 in)
- Width: 498 mm (19.6 in)
- Height: 825 mm (32.5 in)
- Dry weight: 136 kg (300 lb)
- Frontal Area: 6.1 sq ft (0.6 m^{2})

=== Components ===
- Valvetrain: Two valves per cylinder, operated by pushrods and rocker arms
- Oil system: Dry sump with one pressure and three scavenge pumps, 276–310 kPa (40–45 psi)
  - Oil consumption: 0.01095 kg/(kW h) (0.018 lb/(hp h))
- Cooling system: Air-cooled
- Starter: Eclipse inertia starter
- Ignition: 2 x Marelli SA-4 magnetos

=== Performance ===
- Power output:
  - Maximum power: 97 kW (130 hp) at 2,350 rpm
  - Normal: 89 kW (120 hp) at 2,100 rpm
  - Cruising: 67 kW (90 hp) at 1,500 rpm
- Compression ratio: 5.5:1
- Specific fuel consumption: 0.32 kg/(kW h) (0.52 lb/(hp h)) (take-off)
- Power-to-weight ratio: 0.71 kW/kg (0.43 hp/lb)

== See also ==
Comparable engines

- Cirrus Minor
- Cirrus Major
- de Havilland Gipsy
- de Havilland Gipsy Major
- Elizalde Tigre IV
- Hirth HM 504
- Menasco C4

Related lists

- List of aircraft engines
