= Fiat A.50 =

1930s Italian piston aircraft engine

A.50
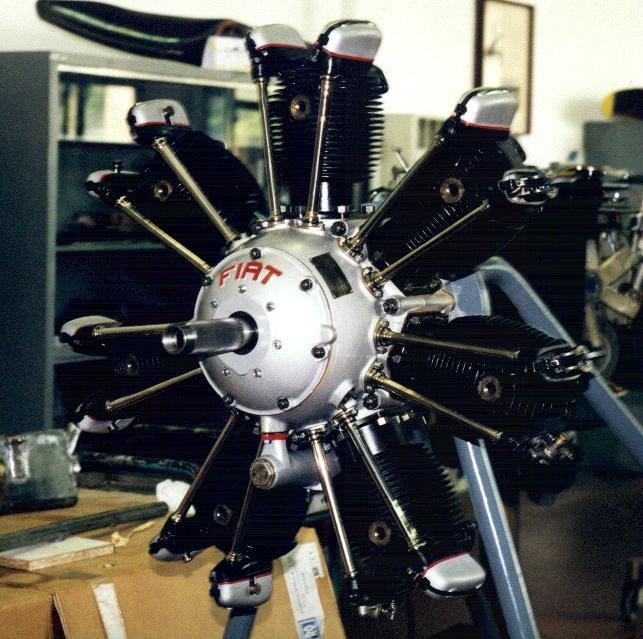
- Fiat A.50 radial aircraft engine at ITIS "Guglielmo Marconi" in Forlì, Italy.
- Type: Piston engine
- Manufacturer: Fiat
- First run: 1928

The Fiat A.50 was a seven-cylinder, air-cooled radial engine for aircraft use built in Italy in the 1930s. It was first run in 1928, it had a bore and stroke of 100 mm × 120 mm (3.94 in × 4.72 in)(6.6 L / 402.6 cuin) and was rated at 78 kW (105 hp) at 1,800 rpm.

== Variants ==
Fiat A.50
Fiat A.50 S

== Applications ==
- Ambrosini SAI.3
- Ambrosini SAI.10
- CANSA C.5
- CANT 26
- Caproni Ca.100
- Fiat AS.1
- IMAM Ro.5

== Specifications ==
Data from

=== General characteristics ===
- Type: Seven-cylinder radial engine
- Bore: 100 mm (3.94 in)
- Stroke: 120 mm (4.72 in)
- Displacement: 6.6 L (402.6 cu in)

=== Components ===
- Fuel system: Carburettor
- Cooling system: Air-cooled

=== Performance ===
- Power output: 78 kW (105 hp)

== See also ==
Related lists

- List of aircraft engines
