= CNA C-7 =

C-7
- Type: Nine-cylinder radial engine
- National origin: Italy
- Manufacturer: Compagnia Nazionale Aeronautica (CNA)

The CNA C-7 was a small nine-cylinder supercharged, geared, single row radial engine designed in Italy in the early 1930s. Three light aircraft class world altitude records were set by the CNA C-7 powered Fiat AS.1 and CNA Eta.

== Applications ==
- CNA Beta
- CNA Eta
- Fiat AS.1

== Specifications ==
Data from Jane's All the World's Aircraft 1938

=== General characteristics ===
- Bore: 80 mm (3.15 in)
- Stroke: 85 mm (3.35 in)
- Displacement: 3.85 L (235 cu in)
- Dry weight: dry 125 kg (276 lb)
- Construction: Aluminium cylinder heads and steel barrels. Cast "Elektron" metal crankcase.

=== Components ===
- Valvetrain: Two valves per cylinder. An overhead camshaft, driven by a bevel shaft running between each pair of cylinders operated the exhaust valve of one and the inlet valve of the next.
- Supercharger: Centrifugal blower running at crankshaft speed.
- Fuel system: 1× Memini carburetter
- Cooling system: Air
- Reduction gear: 3:1
- Ignition: Dual ignition: 2× Marelli plugs per cylinder, driven by a different Marelli magneto

=== Performance ===
- Power output: Normal 134 kW (180 hp) at 4,800 rpm
- Compression ratio: 7:1
