= Ambrosini SAI.3 =

Italian touring airplane in the 1930s

SAI.3
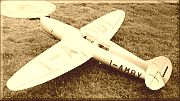

General information
- Type: General aviation aircraft
- Manufacturer: Ambrosini
- Number built: 10

History
- First flight: 1937

The Ambrosini SAI.3 was a two-seat Italian touring airplane first flown in 1937.

== Design and development ==
The SAI.3 was a low-wing monoplane with a graceful, elliptical wing, and fixed tailwheel undercarriage. Customers could choose between enclosed or open cockpits, and between an inline Alfa Romeo 115 engine or a radial Fiat A.50. A revised version was marketed as the SAI.3S with a smaller-chord wing and a Siemens-Halske Sh 14 radial engine, this offering far superior performance to the original SAI.3 design.

== Specifications ==
Data from

General characteristics

- Crew: Two
- Length: 7.04 m (23 ft 1 in)
- Wingspan: 10.46 m (34 ft 4 in)
- Height: 2.82 m (9 ft 3 in)
- Wing area: 13.99 m^{2} (150.6 sq ft)
- Empty weight: 549 kg (1,210 lb)
- Gross weight: 788 kg (1,738 lb)
- Powerplant: 1 × Fiat A.50 radial engine, 63 kW (85 hp)

Performance

- Maximum speed: 200 km/h (124 mph, 108 kn)
- Cruise speed: 169 km/h (105 mph, 91 kn)
- Range: 620 km (385 mi, 335 nmi)
- Service ceiling: 4,000 m (13,120 ft)
