= Compagnia Nazionale Aeronautica =

Compagnia Nazionale Aeronautica was a manufacturer of aircraft and aircraft engines established in Italy in 1920 by Count Giovanni Bonmartini. Together with a group of World War I veteran pilots, he operated a flying school in Rome from a field that would eventually be developed into Littorio Airport. For the next decade or so, CNA also developed their own aircraft and engines to power them. Bonmartini had also worked on an advanced racing motorcycle engine, the GBR in another partnership, and eventually CNA acquired the rights to this as well.

In 1934 Bonmartini sold CNA to Caproni. In turn, Caproni sold rights to the GBR engine to Gilera, who developed it as the Gilera 500 Rondine.

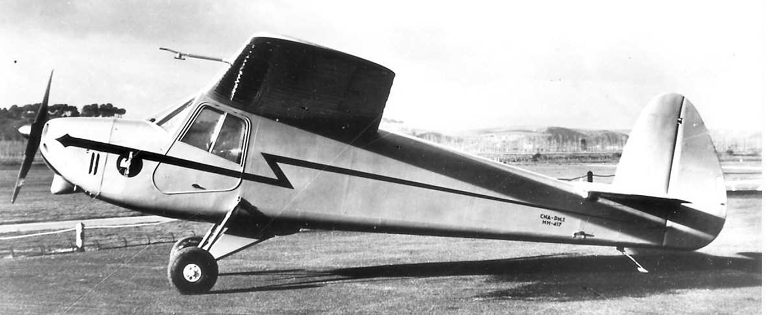
The CNA PM.1, training aircraft built by Compagnia Nazionale Aeronautica

== Aircraft ==
Types from Italian Civil and Military aircraft 1930–1945

- CNA Beta
- CNA Eta
- CNA Teta
- CNA Merrah
- CNA 15
- CNA 25
- CNA PM.1

== Engines ==
- CNA C
- CNA C.II
- CNA C.VI
- CNA C-7
- CNA D-4

== See also ==
- Caproni
- Isotta Fraschini
- Reggiane
