= CNA PM.1 =

PM.1
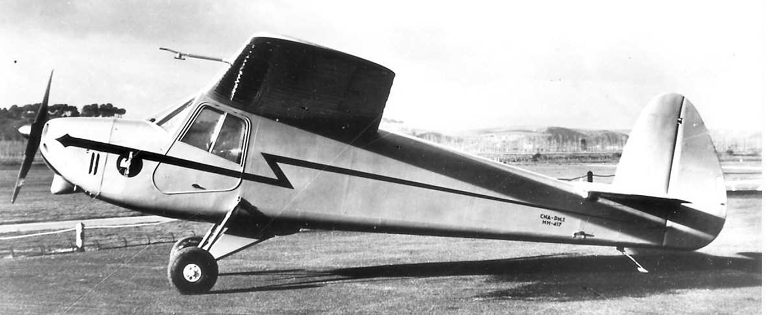

General information
- Type: Two-seat light aircraft
- National origin: Italy
- Manufacturer: Compagnia Nazionale Aeronautica (CNA)
- Number built: 1

History
- First flight: 25 October 1939

The CNA PM.1 was a single-engine light sport and training aircraft designed and built in Italy at the start of World War II. After tests of the prototype a small production run was laid down but destroyed by bombing.

== Design and development ==
The PM.1 was designed by students at the Instituto di Construzioni Aeronautische del Regio Politecnico di Milano in a 1938 competition for a modern, two-seat light private training and sports aircraft. The name came from Polytechnic Milano. The prototype was built by CNA, first flying on 25 October 1939.

The PM.1 was a cantilever high-wing monoplane. Its wing was straight-tapered, with rounded tips and long span ailerons, built of wood with a plywood skin. The tailplane had a similar plan, placed on top of the fuselage with the trailing edge of the elevators in line with the rudder hinge so the rudder, which extended to the base of the fuselage, could move unimpeded. The fin and rudder were rounded and pointed; the rudder carried a trim tab.

The fuselage, also wooden and plywood-covered, was flat-sided, with car-type doors giving access to the side-by-side seats in the cabin which was placed under the leading edge of the wing. In front, a compactly cowled, 40 kW (60 hp) CNA D.4 flat four engine drove a 2-blade propeller. The PM.1 had a conventional undercarriage with mainwheels on centrally mounted, faired V-form half axles and with vertical legs to the bottom longerons, assisted by a tailskid.

== Operational history ==
The outbreak of war and the need to concentrate on front-line aircraft delayed production of the PM.1, but an order for 10 was placed in August 1942. The partially completed aircraft were destroyed in an Allied bombing raid on Rome in July 1943; though the prototype avoided this event, it was destroyed later in the war. Its design influenced that of the post-war Macchi MB.308, though the latter has a tricycle undercarriage and a markedly revised tail.

== Specifications ==
Data from Italian Civil and Military Aircraft 1930-1945

General characteristics

- Crew: 2
- Length: 7.07 m (23 ft 2 in)
- Wingspan: 10.60 m (34 ft 9 in)
- Height: 2.03 m (6 ft 8 in)
- Wing area: 14.0 m^{2} (151 sq ft)
- Empty weight: 360 kg (794 lb)
- Gross weight: 580 kg (1,279 lb)
- Powerplant: 1 × CNA D.4 air-cooled flat four, 45 kW (60 hp)
- Propellers: 2-bladed

Performance

- Maximum speed: 180 km/h (112 mph, 97 kn)
- Cruise speed: 154 km/h (96 mph, 83 kn)
- Range: 600 km (373 mi, 324 nmi)
- Service ceiling: 4,000 m (13,000 ft)
- Time to altitude: 6 min to 1,000 m (3,280 ft)
- Landing speed: 68 kmh; 36 kn (42 mph)
