= Fiat A.53 =

1930s Italian piston aircraft engine

A.53
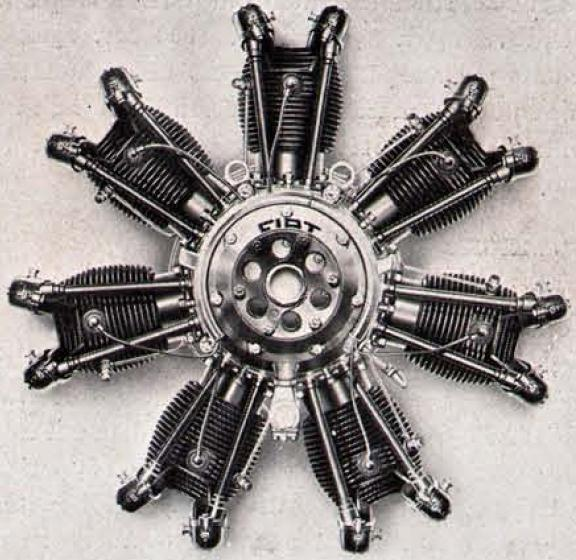
- Fiat A.53
- Type: Piston engine
- National origin: Italy
- Manufacturer: Fiat
- First run: 1931

The Fiat A.53 was a seven-cylinder, air-cooled radial piston engine developed in Italy in the 1930s as a powerplant for aircraft.

== Applications ==
- Caproni Ca.100
- CNA Delta
- Fiat TR.1
- Savoia-Marchetti S.56

== Specifications (A.53) ==
Data from Jane's All the World's Aircraft 1931 and Masino.

=== General characteristics ===
- Type: 7-cylinder air-cooled radial
- Bore: 105 mm (4.13 in)
- Stroke: 120 mm (4.72 in)
- Length: 823 mm (32.40 in)
- Diameter: 900 mm (35.43 in)
- Dry weight: 147 kg (324 lb) dry

=== Components ===
- Valvetrain: Overhead valves operated by pushrods and rockers
- Supercharger: centrifugal single-stage
- Fuel system: oil heated carburetor
- Oil system: dry sump with two pumps
- Cooling system: Air-cooled

=== Performance ===
- Power output: 115 hp (86 kW) at 1,900 rpm - normal

120 hp (89 kW) at 2,100 rpm - maximum

- Compression ratio: 5.5
- Specific fuel consumption: 0.32 kg/kWh (0.52 lb/(hp⋅h))

== See also ==
Related lists

- List of aircraft engines
