= Ambrosini SAI.10 =

Military training aircraft

SAI.10 Grifone
- SAI.10 Grifone

General information
- Type: Military trainer
- Manufacturer: Ambrosini
- Designer: Camillo Silvia
- Primary user: Regia Aeronautica
- Number built: 10

History
- First flight: 1939

The Ambrosini SAI.10 Grifone ("Griffon") was a military trainer aircraft produced in small numbers for the Italian Regia Aeronautica early in World War II.

== History ==
With the approach of war, the Ministero dell' Aeronautica began a programme to increase the number of pilots available, and ordered a prototype primary trainer from Ambrosini. This aircraft, a parasol monoplane of mixed construction, first flew on July 8, 1939, with Guiliano Ferrari at the controls. A production batch of 50 was ordered, but this was quickly reduced to just 10 planes, all of which were delivered in 1940.

== Variants ==
Production aircraft differed by having a Fiat A.50 radial engine in place of the prototype's CNA D. Other engine fits that were tried included an example with a Siemens-Halske Sh 14, and one with an Alfa Romeo 110; this latter machine was designated SAI.11. Another experimental development that did not enter production was a float-equipped SAI.10 Gabbiano ("Seagull").

== Operators ==
Kingdom of Italy

- Regia Aeronautica

== Specifications ==
SAI.10 Gabbiano floatplane

Data from Italian Civil and Military Aircraft 1930–1945

General characteristics

- Crew: two, pilot and instructor
- Length: 6.50 m (21 ft 4 in)
- Wingspan: 10.30 m (33 ft 9.5 in)
- Height: 2.10 m (6 ft 10.75 in)
- Wing area: 14.3 m^{2} (154 sq ft)
- Empty weight: 400 kg (880 lb)
- Gross weight: 615 kg (1,353 lb)
- Powerplant: 1 × Fiat A.50 radial , 63 kW (85 hp)

Performance

- Maximum speed: 187 km/h (116 mph, 101 kn)
- Cruise speed: 161 km/h (100 mph, 87 kn)
