= CANSA C.5 =

Italian training biplane

C.5
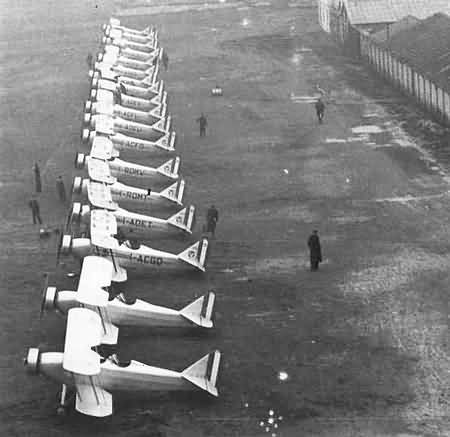

General information
- Type: Civil trainer
- Manufacturer: Costruzioni Aeronautiche Novaresi S.A. (CANSA)
- Designer: Giacomo Mosso
- Primary user: Regia Aeronautica
- Number built: 65

History
- First flight: 24 July 1939

The CANSA C.5 was a training biplane developed in Italy shortly before World War II.

== Design and development ==
The C5's conventional open-cockpit, tailskid design was produced en masse in Italy under license. Originally aimed at the civil market, no sales ensued, but CANSA found a customer in the Regia Aeronautica, which placed an order for twelve aircraft in October 1939; six single-seaters and six two-seaters. This was followed by an order for fifty machines the following year. Most of the C.5s were operated by RUNA to provide basic flying training and remained in service until the Italian armistice.

== Variants ==
- C.5 - single-seat version with Fiat A.50 engine
- C.5B - two-seat version with Fiat A.50 engine
  - C.5B/1 - two-seat version with Alfa Romeo 110 engine

== Specifications (C.5) ==
Data from Dimensione Cielo

General characteristics

- Crew: One pilot
- Length: 6.22 m (20 ft 5 in)
- Wingspan: 8.50 m (27 ft 11 in)
- Height: 2.52 m (8 ft 3 in)
- Wing area: 18.0 m^{2} (194 sq ft)
- Empty weight: 453 kg (999 lb)
- Gross weight: 633 kg (1,396 lb)
- Powerplant: 1 × Fiat A.50 , 63 kW (85 hp)

Performance

- Maximum speed: 176 km/h (109 mph, 95 kn)
- Stall speed: 78 km/h (48 mph, 42 kn)
- Range: 640 km (400 mi, 350 nmi)
- Service ceiling: 4,650 m (15,260 ft)
- Time to altitude: 20 min 5 s to 3,000 m (9,800 ft)
