= CANT Z.1010 =

Italian passenger aircraft in the mid-1930s

Z.1010
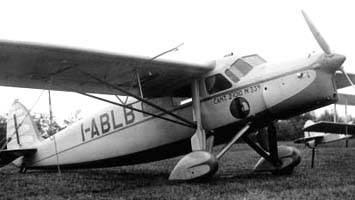

General information
- Type: Light passenger aircraft
- National origin: Italy
- Manufacturer: Cantieri Aeronautici e Navali Triestini (CANT)
- Designer: Filippo Zappata
- Number built: 1

History
- First flight: 14 August 1935

The CANT Z.1010 was a single engine, five seat Italian passenger aircraft flown in the mid-1930s. Only one was built.

== Design and development ==
The Z.1010 was a wooden monoplane with a high wing of elliptical plan and a high aspect ratio of 9.0. On each side a pair of V-form lift struts ran from the lower fuselage to the two wing spars, assisted by jury struts. There were flaps inboard of short span ailerons. The tail surfaces were conventional and curved in profile, with a rudder that ran down to the base of the fuselage between split elevators. The control surfaces were unbalanced and the fin and tailplane externally braced together.

The aircraft was powered by a version of the de Havilland Gipsy Major 4-cylinder inverted inline engine, licence built by Alfa Romeo, which produced 90 kW (120 hp) and drove a two blade propeller. Aft of the pilot's side windows, two further rectangular windows on each side lit the passenger cabin, the forward one on the port side incorporated into a cabin access door. The Z.1010 had a fixed, conventional undercarriage with enclosed, faired mainwheels on faired half axles mounted on the lower fuselage. Tall, faired shock absorbing legs ran from wheels to wing roots.

The Z.1010 had been built for the Littorio Air Rally, starting on 24 August 1935, which it attended shortly after its first flight on 14 August, piloted by Mario Stoppani. The Z.1010 attracted no orders despite attending several rallies; it was seriously damaged in 1936 during practice for the Saharan Circuit competition and was not rebuilt.

== Specifications ==
Data from Italian Civil and Military Aircraft 1930-1945

General characteristics

- Crew: 1
- Capacity: 5 passengers
- Length: 8.07 m (26 ft 6 in)
- Wingspan: 12.60 m (41 ft 4 in)
- Height: 2.59 m (8 ft 6 in)
- Wing area: 15.98 m^{2} (172.0 sq ft)
- Empty weight: 599 kg (1,320 lb)
- Gross weight: 998 kg (2,200 lb)
- Powerplant: 1 × Alfa Romeo 110-1 4-cylinder air-cooled inverted inline piston, 89 kW (120 hp) Licence built de Havilland Gipsy Major
- Propellers: 2-bladed

Performance

- Maximum speed: 206 km/h (128 mph, 111 kn)
- Cruise speed: 175 km/h (109 mph, 95 kn)
- Stall speed: 64 km/h (40 mph, 35 kn) flaps down
- Service ceiling: 6,000 m (19,680 ft)
