= Rome Urbe Airport =

Rome Urbe Airport Aeroporto di Roma-Urbe
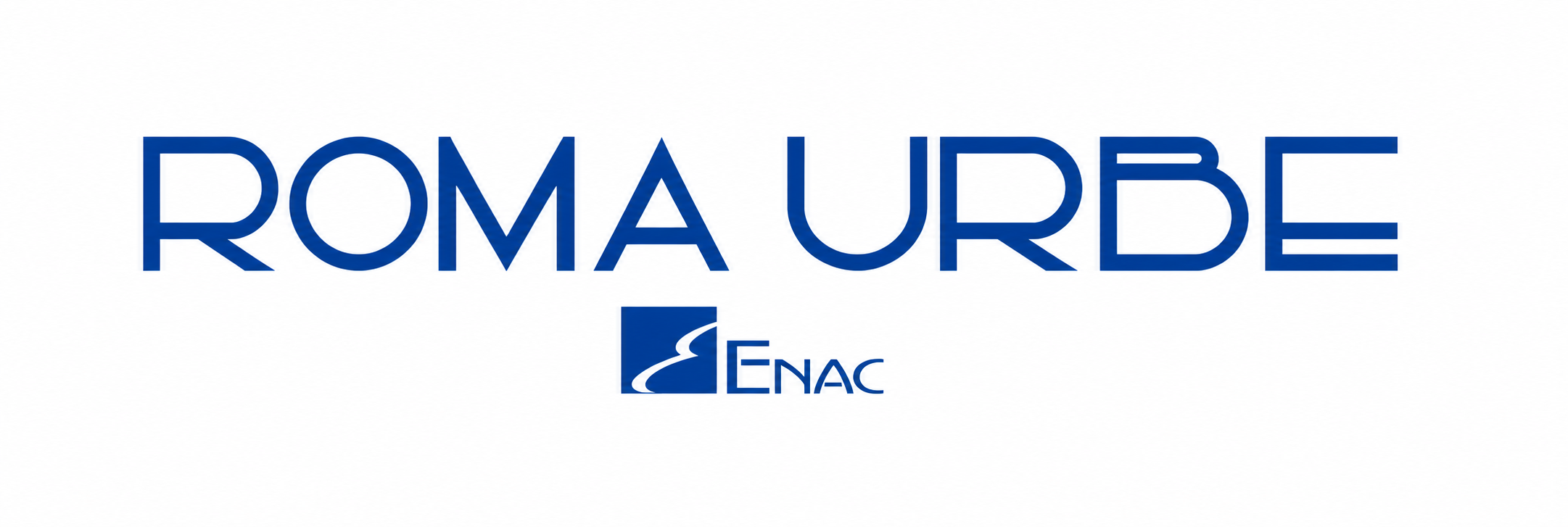

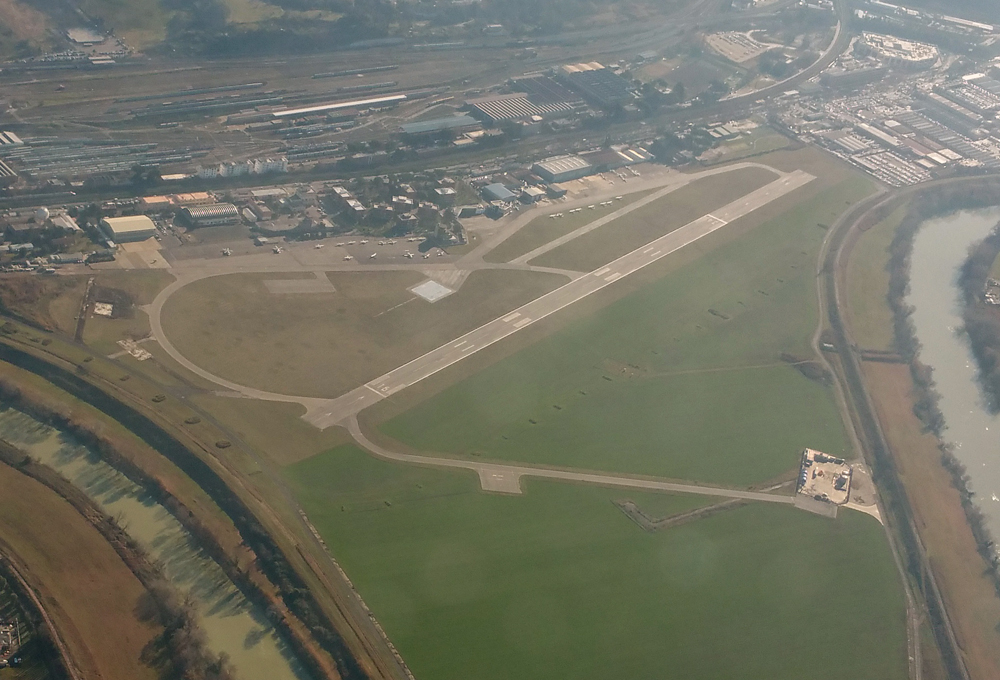
- IATA: none; ICAO: LIRU

Summary
- Airport type: Public
- Owner/Operator: ENAC
- Location: Rome, Lazio, Italy
- Opened: April 21, 1928 (98 years ago)
- Elevation AMSL: 55 ft (17 m)
- Coordinates: 41°57′07″N 012°29′56″E
- Website: enac.gov.it

Map
- Location of airport on map of Rome Location of airport on map of Lazio Location of Lazio region in Italy

Runways
Direction	Length		Surface
Direction	m	ft	Surface
16/34	1,080	3,543	Bitumen
- Source: Rome's Aeroclub Website

Rome Urbe Airport (Italian: Aeroporto di Roma-Urbe, ICAO: LIRU) is a small civilian airport in Rome, situated in the northern part of the city, between Via Salaria and the Tiber River, about 2.7 NM (5 km, 3.1 mi) inside the Greater Ring Road (Italian: Grande Raccordo Anulare or GRA), the circular motorway around the city.

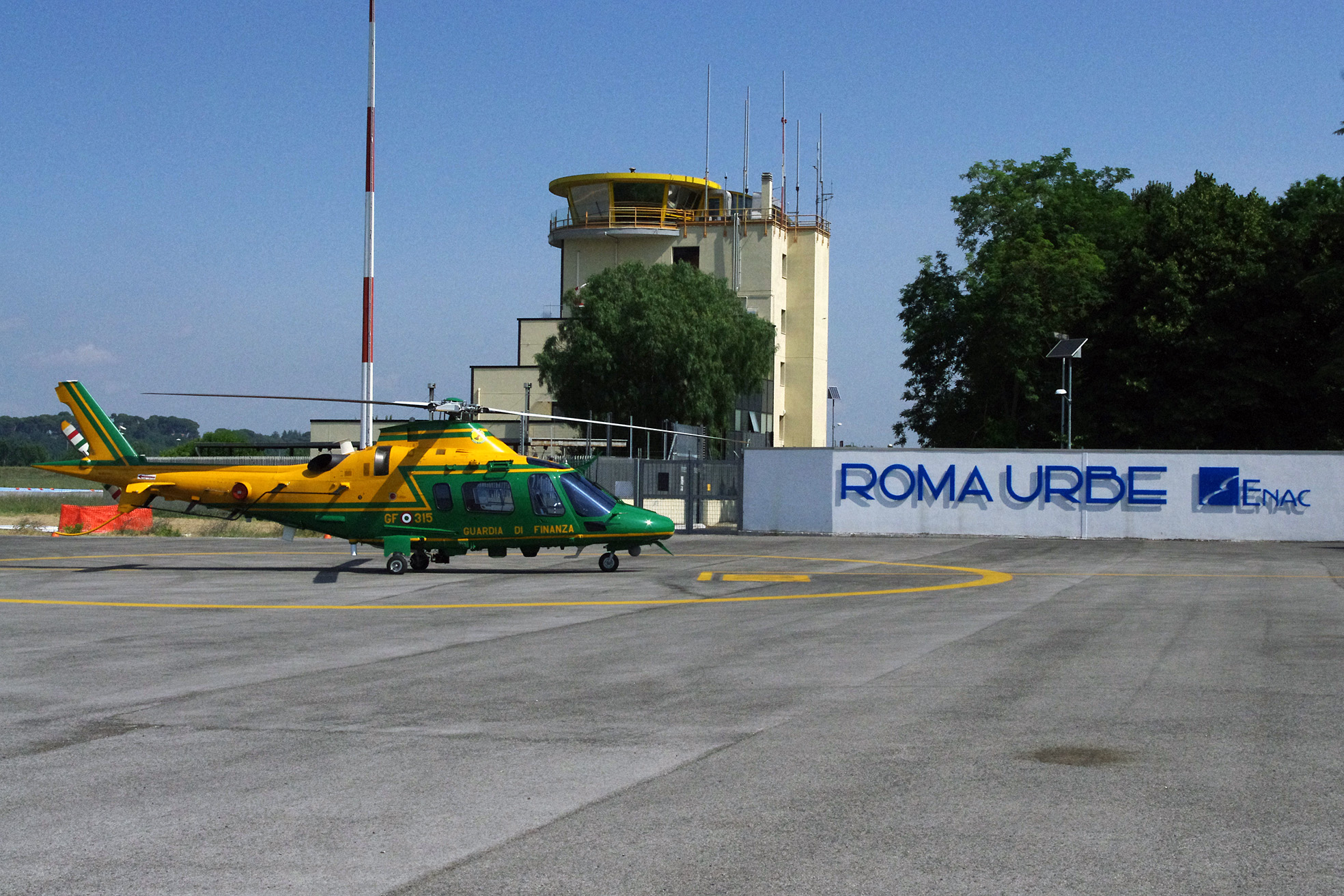
Roma-Urbe Airport: control tower and apron in front of the new terminal.

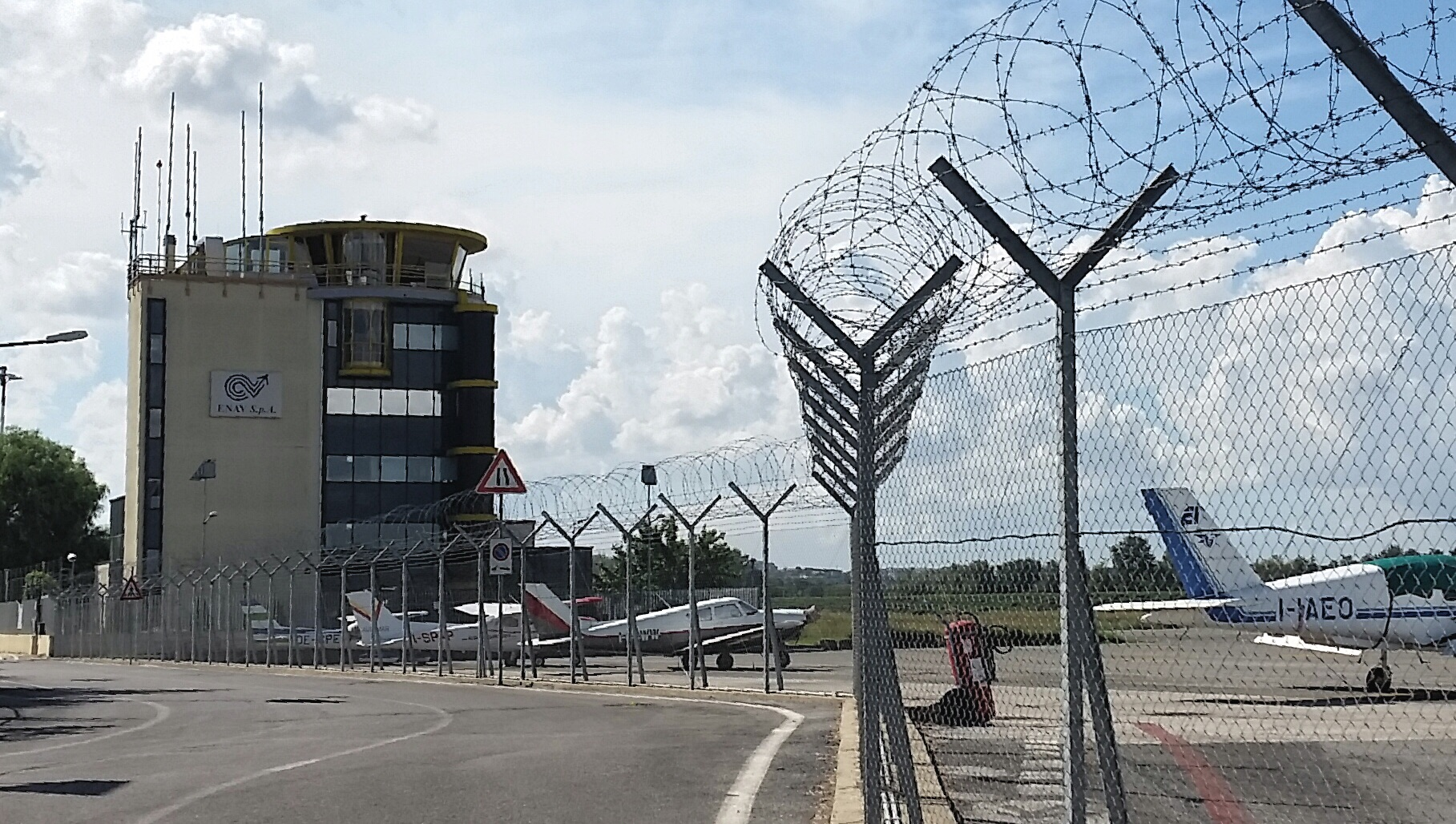
ENAV control tower of Roma-Urbe airport.

The airport offers services to private and general aviation flights, as well as a heliport. The airport facilities host the Rome Urbe weather station, the Aeroclub of Rome and the AvioNews press agency. Since 2021, the military area of the airport has been home to the Italian Air Force Band.

== History ==
The airport was inaugurated in Benito Mussolini's presence in 1928, with the name "Littorio Airport" (the name was chosen by Mussolini himself). Until World War II it was the main civilian airport in Italy, and the base for the Italian national airline Ala Littoria. Inside the perimeter also a racetrack was constructed, named Autodromo del Littorio ("Littorio Racetrack"). In 1931 a car/plane challenge took place on the racetrack inside the airport: Vittorio Suster, piloting a Caproni Ca.100, defeated Tazio Nuvolari, who drove an Alfa Romeo 8C 2300.

Heavily damaged by bombardments during the war, the airport was reactivated with the current name in the first postwar years. But just a few years later the commercial activity was transferred to the Ciampino Airport. Since that moment the Rome Urbe Airport turned mostly into a facility for flying club activity, touristic flights and air taxi. It is currently the base for the Aeroclub di Roma (Rome's flying club). In 1995 FAR Airlines carried out several trial landings with a de Havilland Dash 7 STOL airliner acquired from Tyrolean Airways. Their plan to link Urbe to several Italian cities failed when the company ceased operations shortly thereafter. In 2010, thanks to the investment of €800.000 by the ENAC (the civil aviation authority of Italy, that manages the airport) a new terminal was opened for helicopters. On 18 September 1997 the airport was the scene for a U2 concert, part of their Pop Mart Tour; an audience of 70,000 attended the event.

== Access ==
The Rome Urbe Airport can be reached with public transport by bus or by train: the Nuovo Salario Station (FL1 line) is 400 m (0.25 mi) from the airport.

== Gallery ==
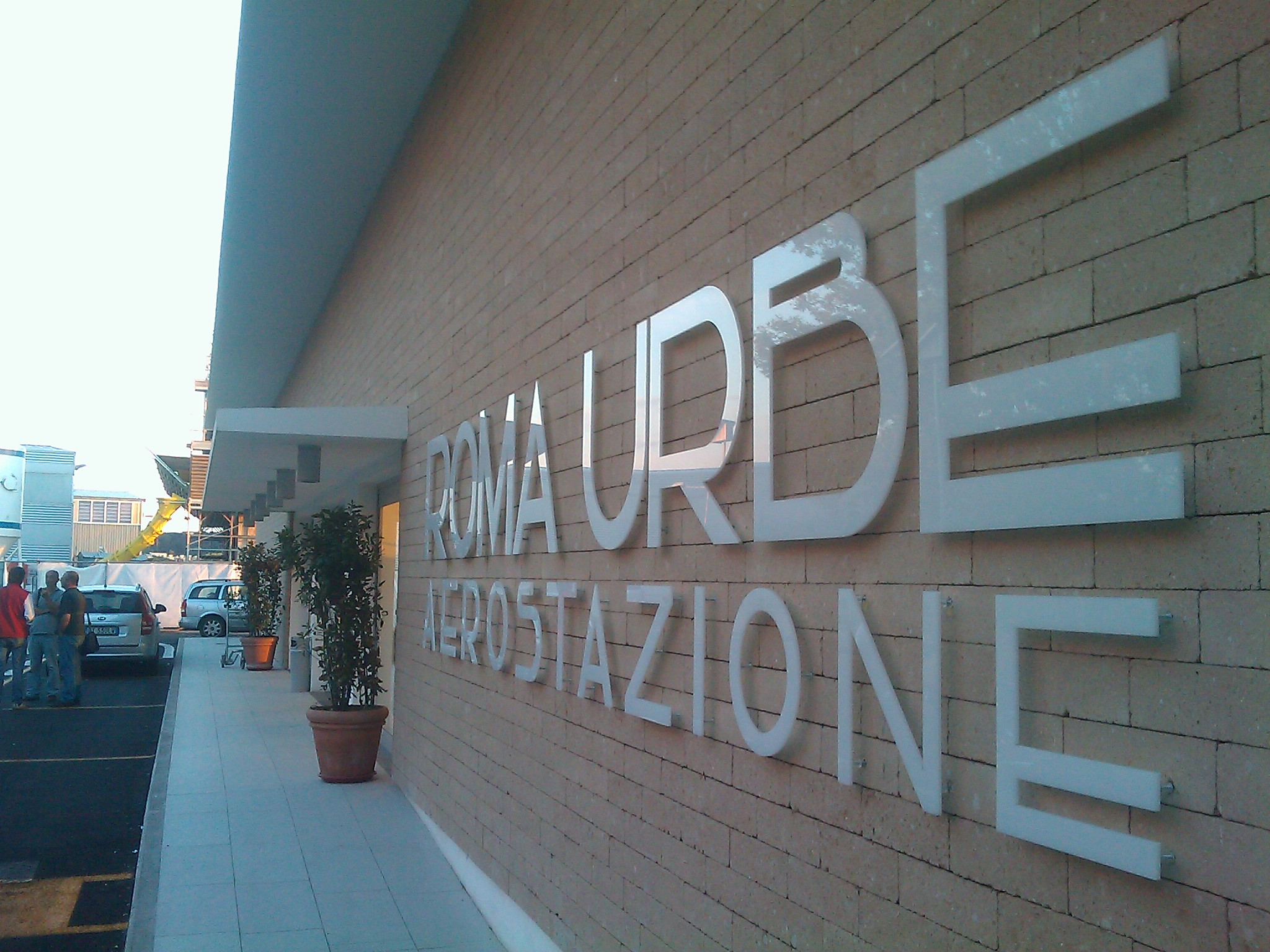
Façade of the new airport terminal

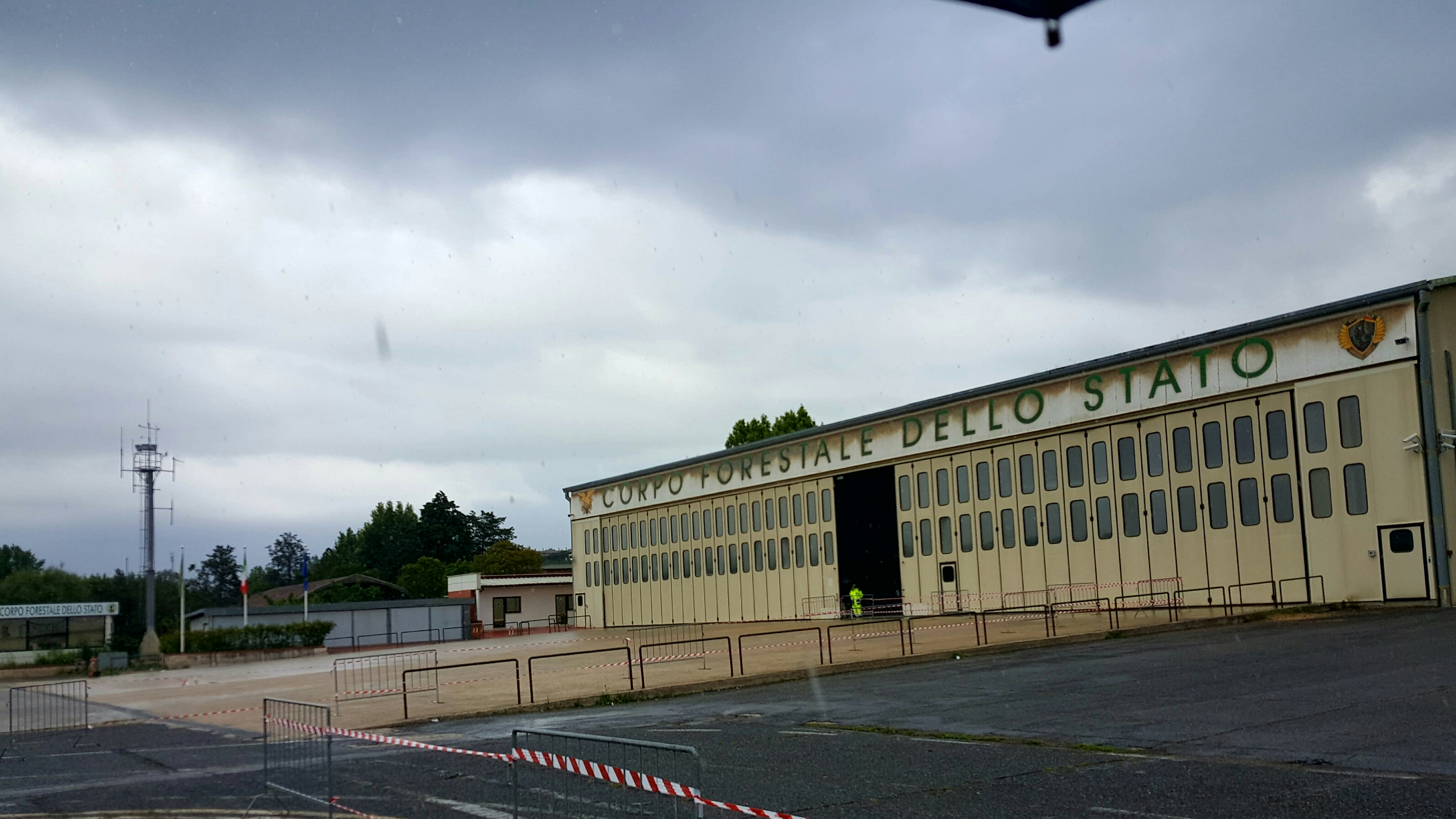
Base of the State Forestry Corps

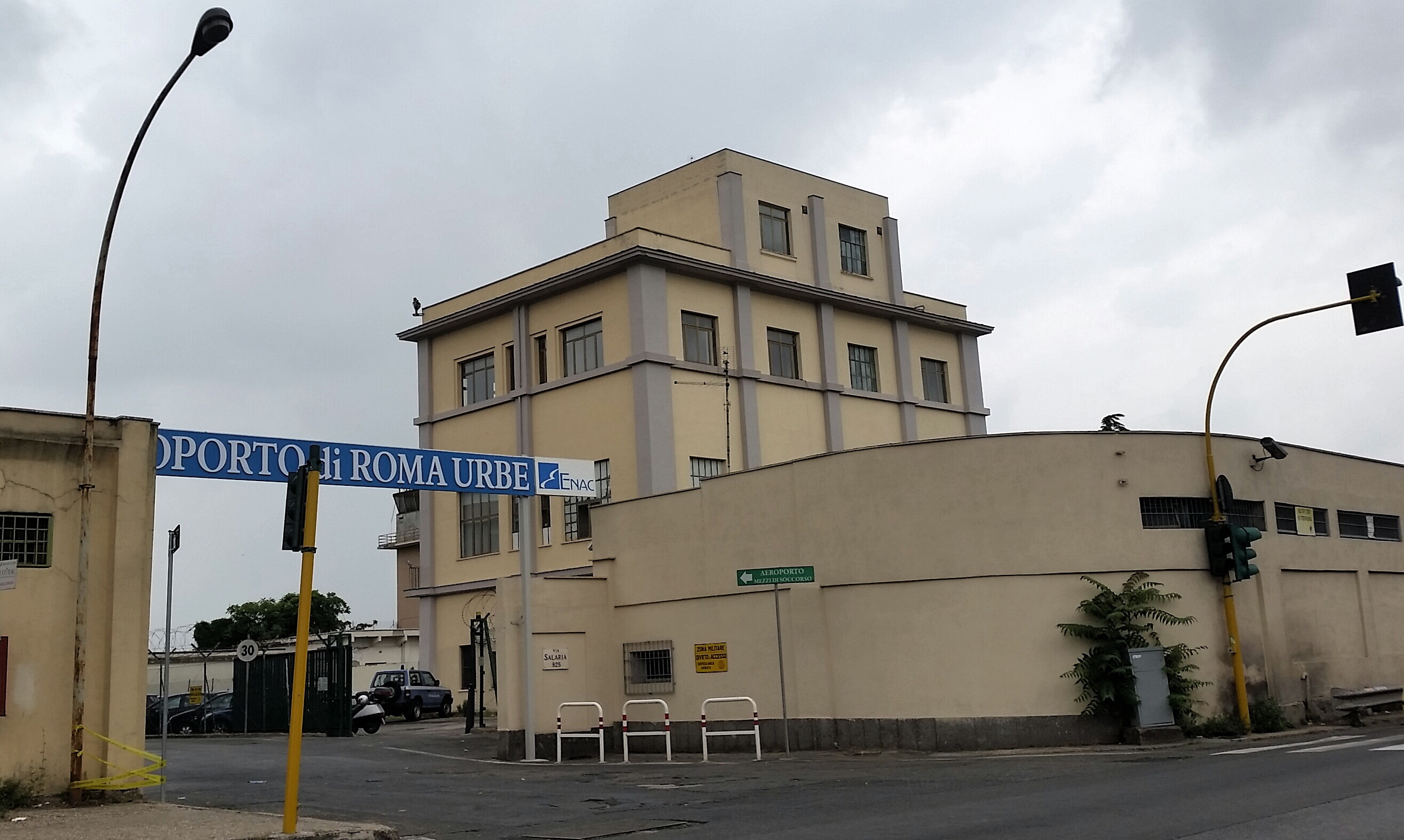
Airport entrance on Via Salaria

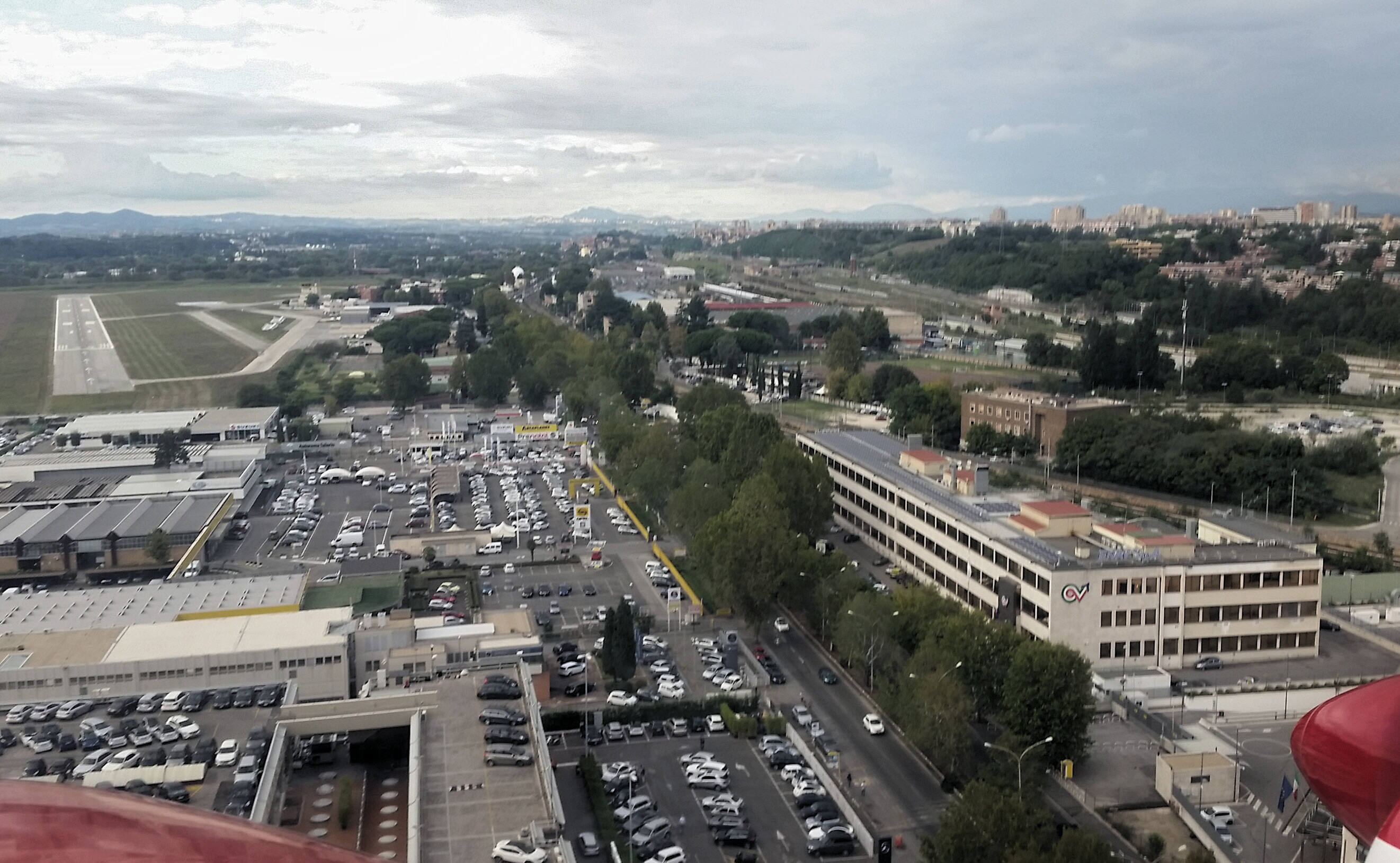
View of the airport. On the right, the ENAV headquarters.

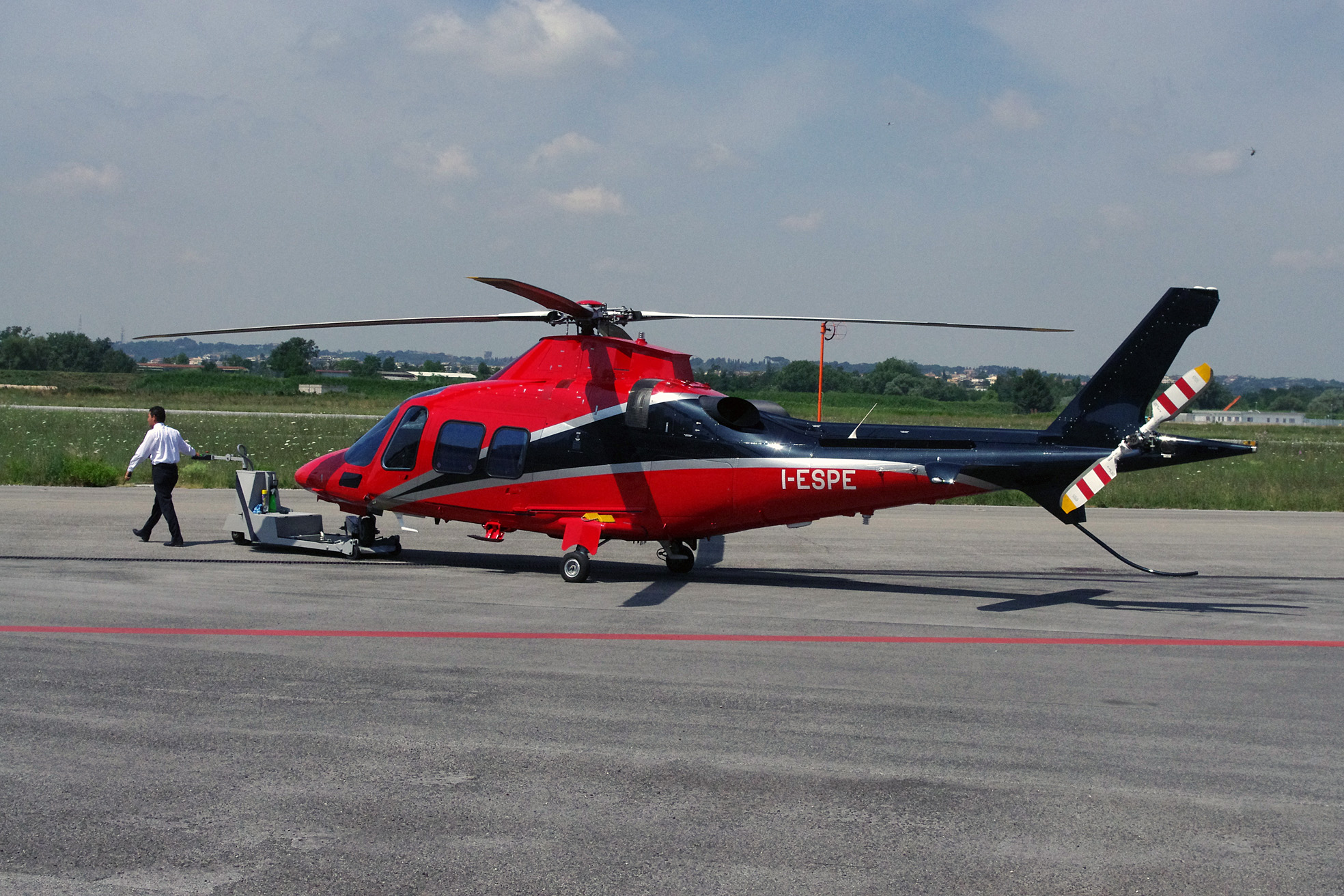
An AgustaWestland AW109 under tow

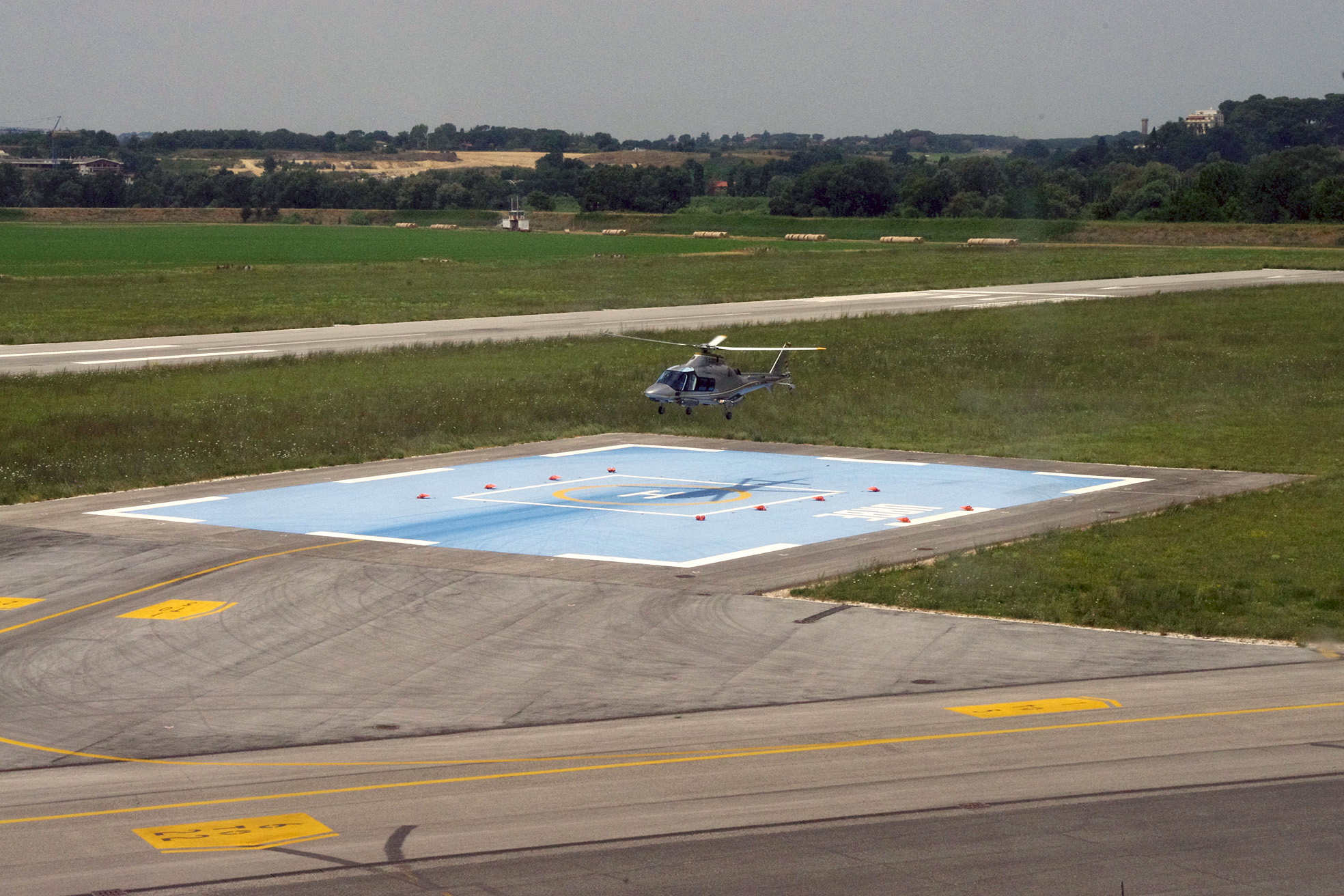
An AgustaWestland AW109 landing

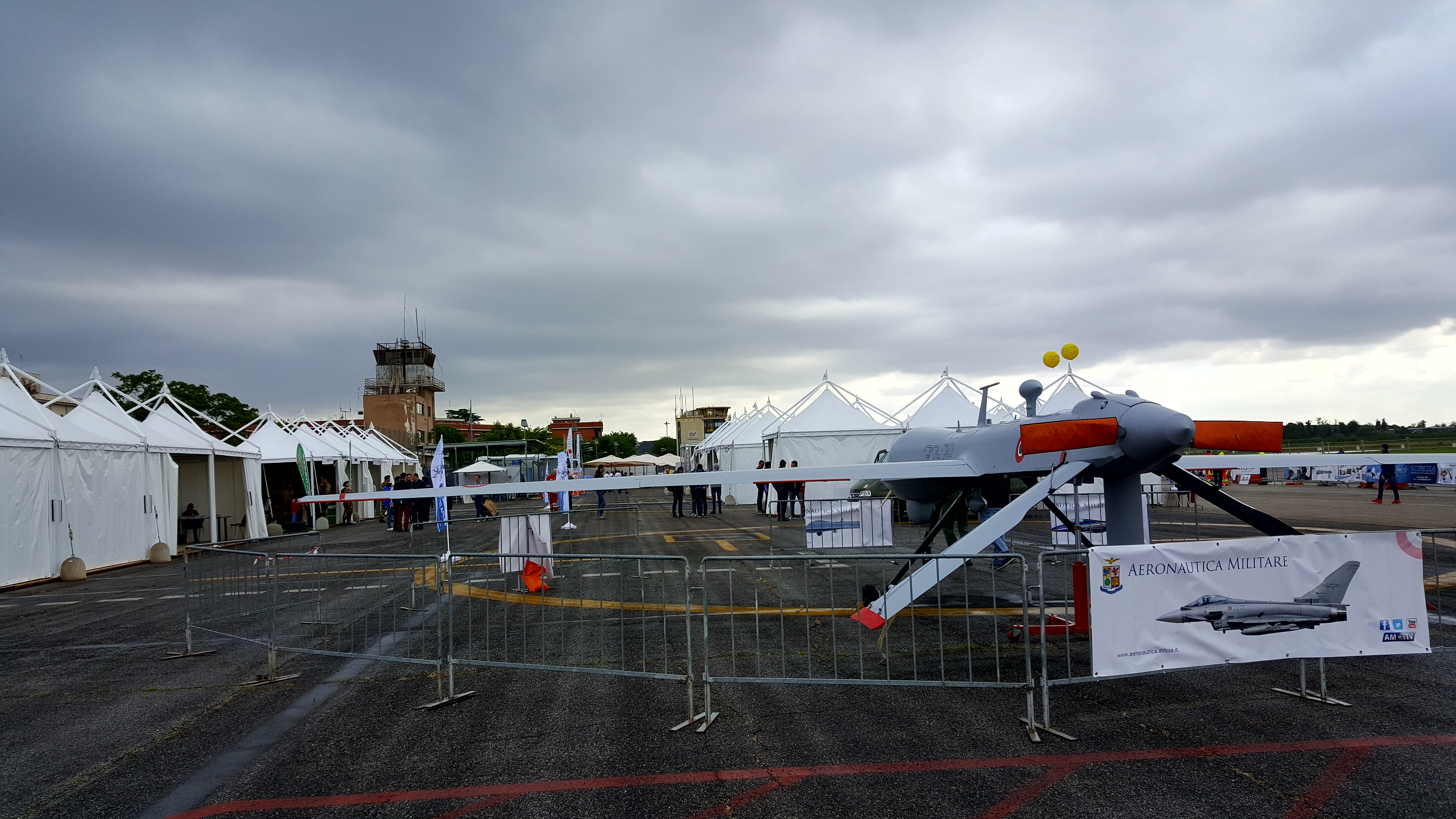
Roma Drone Expo&Show 2016
