= Macchi M.B.308 =

Light aircraft produced in Italy in the late 1940s

MB.308 / MB-308
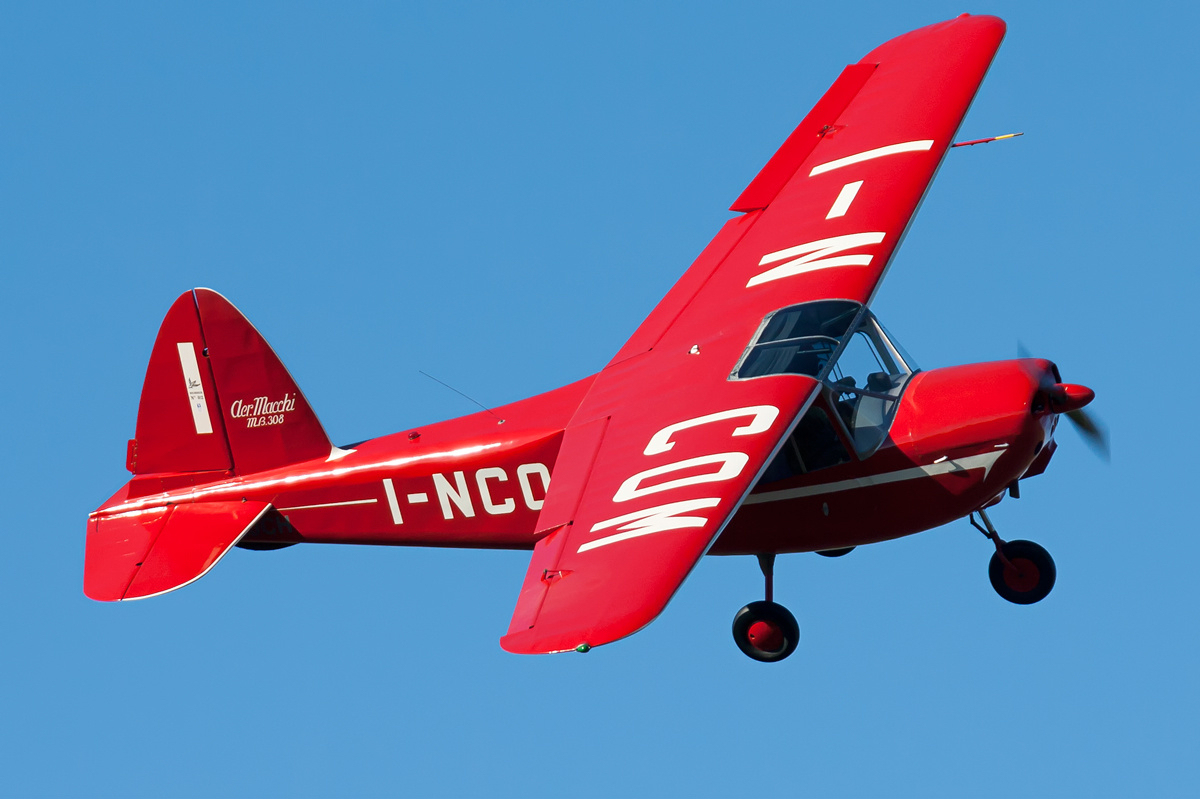
- Aermacchi MB-308 in flight at the Historical Aircraft Group FlyParty 2014

General information
- Type: Utility aircraft
- National origin: Italy
- Manufacturer: Macchi
- Built by: German Bianco
- Primary users: Italian Air Force: Argentine National Gendarmerie; Egyptian Air Force; Lebanese Air Force
- Number built: 183

History
- First flight: 19 January 1947

The Macchi MB.308, later Aermacchi MB-308, is a light aircraft produced in Italy in the late 1940s.

== Development ==
Development of the MB.308 began shortly after the end of the Second World War under the direction of Macchi technical director Ermanno Bazzocchi. Seeking to re-establish the company’s presence in the emerging civil aviation market, Bazzocchi based the new aircraft on his earlier CNA PM.1 light aircraft design, a pre-war project that had never entered production after its prototype was destroyed during the war. The resulting aircraft retained the PM.1’s general arrangement as a high-wing cabin monoplane but incorporated a tricycle undercarriage.

The prototype, registered “I-FABR”, was completed in 1946 and made its maiden flight on 19 January 1947. It was initially powered by a 60 hp CNA D.4 engine, but difficulties obtaining sufficient engines led Macchi to adopt readily available American-built Continental engines for production aircraft, beginning with the Continental C65 and later more powerful C85 and C90 variants as the design evolved.

The production aircraft was a conventional high-wing cantilever monoplane with fixed tricycle undercarriage. Construction throughout was of wood. The pilot and a single passenger or instructor sat side by side, and later examples had a third seat behind them.

The MB.308 was ordered in quantity by the Italian Air Force, which leased them out to Italy's aeroclubs. A modified version with a higher-powered engine was put into production in Argentina, under licence to sailplane manufacturer German Bianco.

== Operators ==
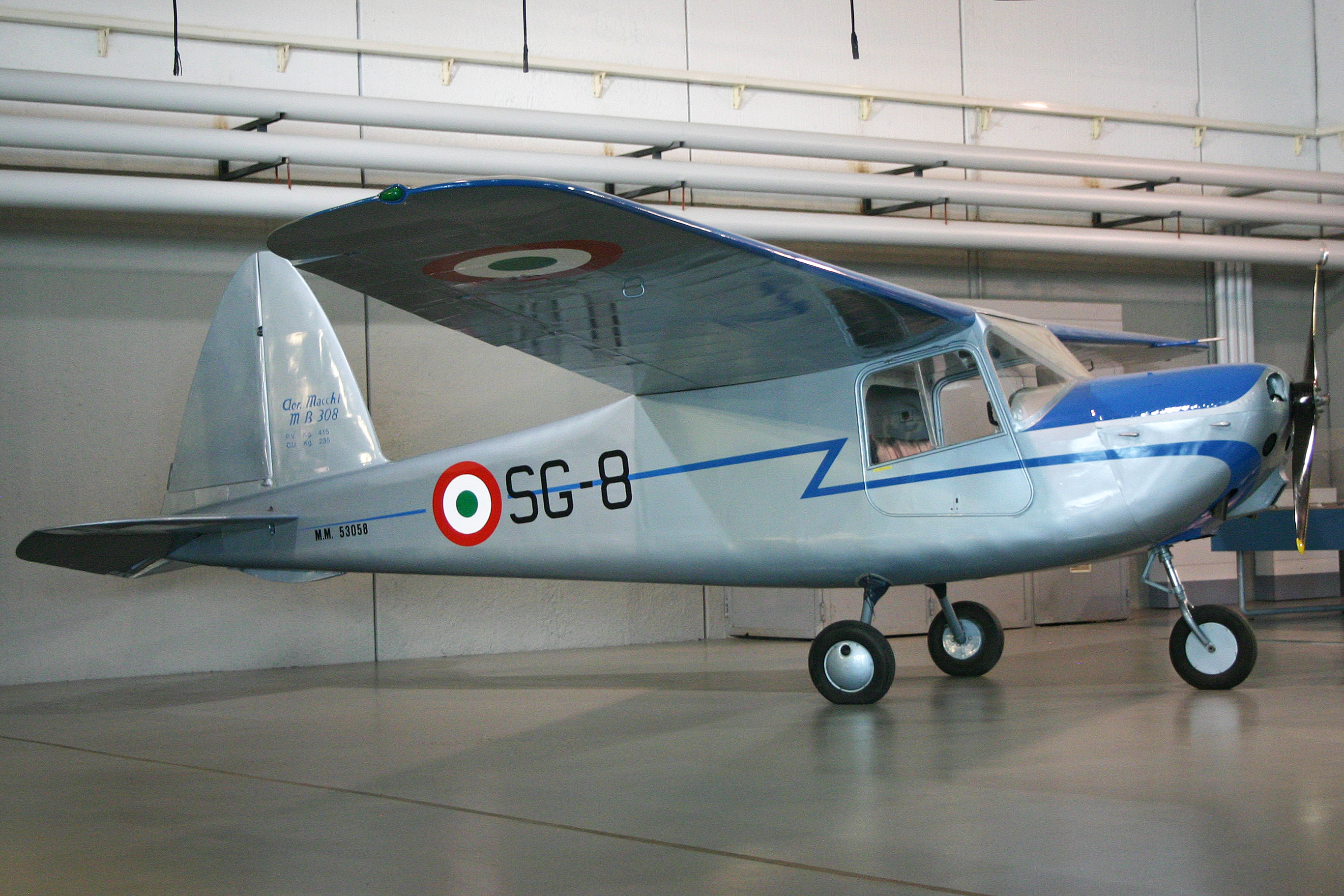
An Italian MB308

Argentina

- Argentine National Gendarmerie

Egypt

- Egyptian Air Force

Italy

- Italian Air Force (Aeronautica Militare Italiana) - received 81 aircraft in 1948 and were retired in 1954

Lebanon

- Lebanese Air Force

== Variants ==
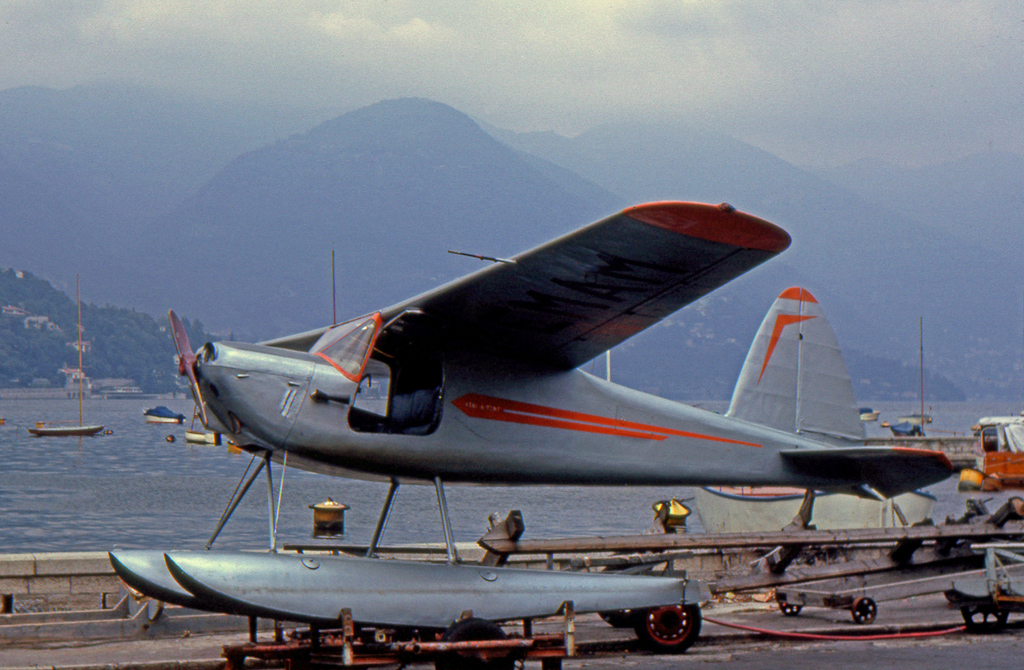
MB.308 Idro, Italy, 1965

MB.308
Two-seat version with an 85 hp (63 kW) or 90 hp (67 kW) Continental engine. 137 built.
MB.308 Idro
Seaplane version
MB.308G
Three-seat version with a 90 hp (67 kW) Continental C90 engine.
MB.308-100
MB.308G built by German Bianco in Argentina with a 100 hp (75 kW) Continental O-200-A engine. Approximately 46 built.

== Specifications (MB.308 - C85 engine) ==
Data from Jane's All The World's Aircraft 1955–56

General characteristics

- Crew: 2
- Length: 6.53 m (21 ft 5 in)
- Wingspan: 10.00 m (32 ft 10 in)
- Height: 2.18 m (7 ft 2 in)
- Wing area: 13.72 m^{2} (147.7 sq ft)
- Empty weight: 410 kg (904 lb)
- Gross weight: 650 kg (1,433 lb)
- Fuel capacity: 80 litres (21 US gal; 18 imp gal)
- Powerplant: 1 × Continental C85 air-cooled flat-four, 63 kW (85 hp)

Performance

- Maximum speed: 197 km/h (122 mph, 106 kn)
- Cruise speed: 164 km/h (102 mph, 89 kn) (70% power)
- Range: 760 km (470 mi, 410 nmi)
- Service ceiling: 4,500 m (14,800 ft)
- Time to altitude: 6 minutes to 1,000 m (3,300 ft)

== See also ==
Aircraft of comparable role, configuration, and era

- Cessna 150
