= CNA D =

D
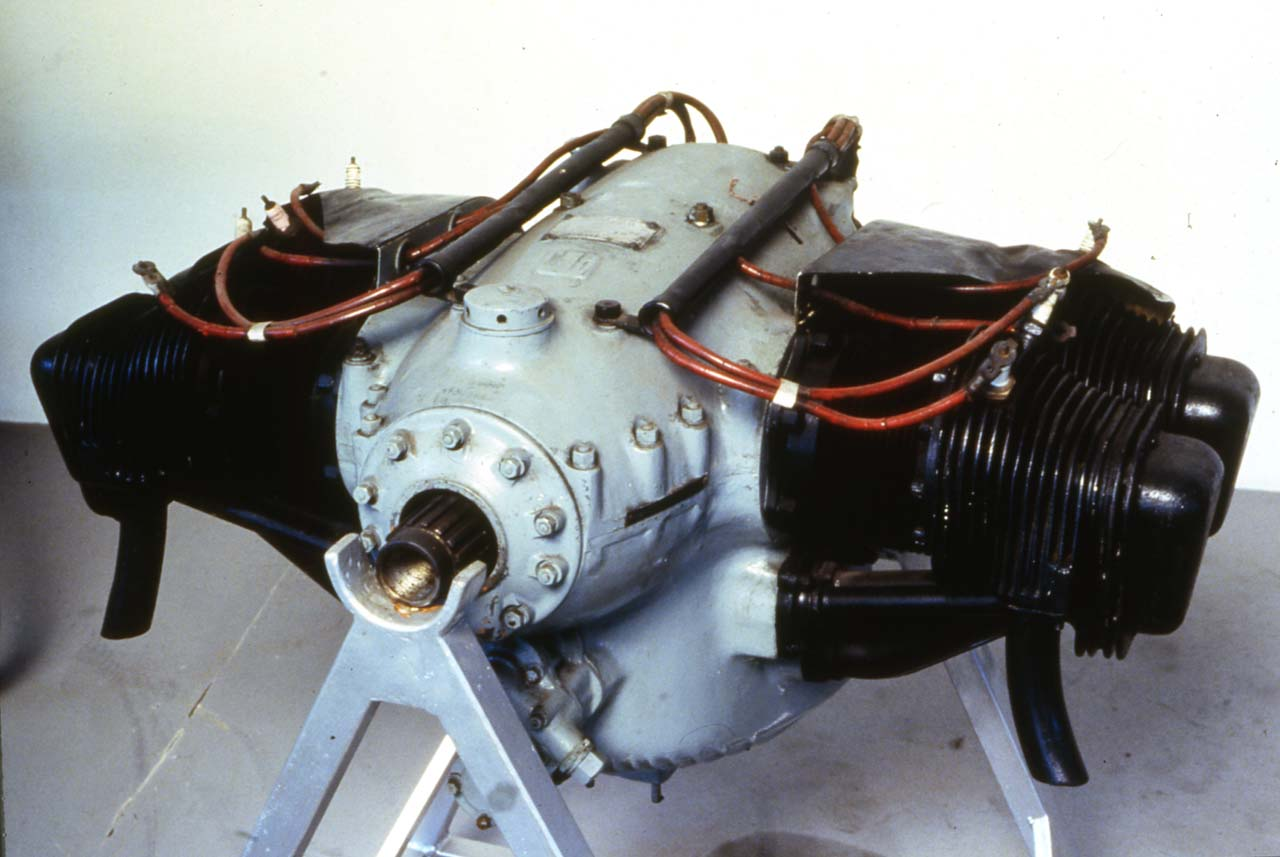
- CNA D.4 on display at Museo Nazionale Scienza e Tecnologia Leonardo da Vinci
- Type: 4-cylinder air-cooled horizontally opposed piston engine
- National origin: Italy
- Manufacturer: Compagnia Nazionale Aeronautica (CNA)

The CNA D, often known as the CNA D.4, was a four-cylinder, air-cooled, horizontally opposed engine built in Italy by Compagnia Nazionale Aeronautica (CNA) between 1940 and 1951 to power light aircraft.

== Applications ==
Data from Erickson

- Adam RA-14 Loisirs
- Ambrosini SAI.10
- CNA PM.1
- CNA MPL
- CVV Tartuca
- Druine Condor
- GCA Pedro
- GCA Etabeta
- Lombardi FL.3
- Lombardi FL.5
- Lombardi FL.7
- Macchi MB.308
- Viberti Muscal

== Specifications ==
Data from

=== General characteristics ===
- Type: 4-cyl. air-cooled horizontally-opposed piston engine
- Bore: 100 mm (3.9 in)
- Stroke: 95 mm (3.7 in)
- Displacement: 3 L (180 cu in)
- Dry weight: 80 kg (180 lb)

=== Performance ===
- Power output: 45 kW (60 hp) at 2,100 rpm
- Compression ratio: 5.3:1
- Specific fuel consumption: 0.34 kg/kW hr (0.56 lb/hp hr)

== See also ==
Related lists

- List of aircraft engines
