= CNA C.II =

Aircraft engine

C.II
- Type: Horizontally opposed air-cooled twin
- National origin: Italy
- Manufacturer: Compagnia Nazionale Aeronautica (CNA)
- Manufactured: 1937-41

The CNA C.II was a small, air-cooled, two-cylinder horizontally opposed aircraft engine designed and built in Italy in the late 1930s.

== Design ==
The low power, unsupercharged C.II had offset cylinders with special steel barrels and light alloy cylinder heads. The pistons were light alloy castings; the connecting rods were heat treated chrome-nickel steel, with split big ends. The CN.II had a one piece chrome-nickel steel crankshaft running in two roller bearings, with a ball thrust bearing. The crankcase was a one piece light alloy casting.

== Applications ==
Data from Erickson

- Alaparma AM-8
- Alaparma AM-9
- Alaparma AM-10
- Partenavia P.53 Aeroscooter

== Specifications ==
Data from Jane's All the World's Aircraft 1938

=== General characteristics ===
- Bore: 90 mm (3.54 in)
- Stroke: 110 mm (4.33 in)
- Displacement: 1.4 L (85.4 cu in)
- Length: 478 mm (18.81 in)
- Width: 856 mm (33.70 in)
- Height: 526 mm (20.71 in)
- Dry weight: dry 42 kg (92.6 lb)

=== Components ===
- Valvetrain: Large diameter overhead valves, one inlet and one exhaust per cylinder. Enclosed rocker gear operated by push-rods driven off upper crankcase camshaft.
- Oil system: Wet sump; crankshaft fed pressurised oil by pump.
- Cooling system: Air

=== Performance ===
- Power output: rated 28 kW (38 hp) at 2,700 rpm at sea level
