= CNA C.VI =

C.VI
- Type: Six cylinder inverted air-cooled in-line.
- National origin: Italy
- Manufacturer: Compagnia Nazionale Aeronautica (CNA)

The CNA C.VI I.R.C.43 was a six-cylinder, supercharged, inverted, inline engine designed and built in Italy in the 1930s. Following standard Italian practice, the designation IRC43 indicated that the engine was inverted, geared down and had a supercharger rated to 4,300 m (14,110 ft).

== Applications ==
Data from Italian Civil and Military Aircraft 1930-1945

- CNA Eta
- CNA 15
- CNA 25

== Specifications ==
Data from Jane's All the World's Aircraft 1938

=== General characteristics ===
- Bore: 90 mm (3.54 in)
- Stroke: 110 mm (4.33 in)
- Displacement: 4.2 L (256.2 cu in)
- Dry weight: dry 185 kg (408 lb)

=== Components ===
- Valvetrain: Two underhead camshafts, one for inlet valves and one for exhaust
- Supercharger: Roots type rated to 4,300 m (14,110 ft)
- Cooling system: Air
- Reduction gear: 2:1

=== Performance ===
- Power output: rated 112 kW (150 hp) at 3,400 rpm at 4,300 m (14,110 ft)
- Fuel consumption: 0.33 kg/kWh (0.54 lb/hp h)
- Oil consumption: 24 g/kWh (0.053 lb/hp h)
