= Fiat AS.1 =

Italian touring aircraft model

AS.1/AS.2/TR.1
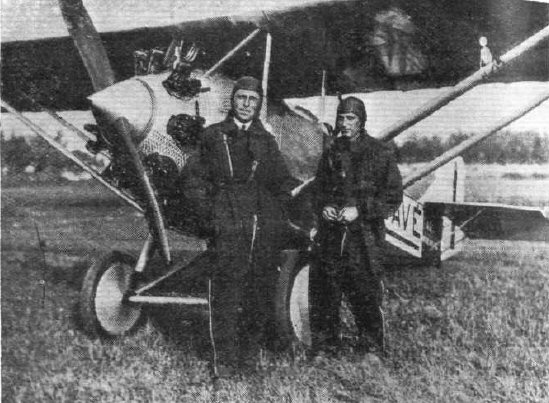
- Fiat AS.1 of Lombardi and Capannini

General information
- Type: Touring aircraft
- Manufacturer: Fiat
- Number built: ca. 550

History
- First flight: 1928

The Fiat AS.1 was a light touring monoplane aircraft designed and produced by the Italian aircraft manufacturer Fiat.

The AS.1 was a relatively basic and conventional design, possessing a parasol wing, a tailskid undercarriage and seating for two, the pilot and one passenger/trainee, in tandem open cockpits. Construction was of wood throughout, covered by plywood, fabric, and (around the nose) metal. A later development, designated TR.1 featured a metal structure and a shorter span wing.

The type proved to be extremely popular, and the production run would eventually extend to over 500 machines, with roughly half of these purchased by the Regia Aeronautica as trainers and liaison aircraft.

== Design ==
The Fiat AS.1 was a light twin-seat monoplane aircraft intended for long-distance touring and training. Both the pilot and passenger were completely enclosed within a cabin, the latter typically being seated in front of the former. The aircraft was typically provisioned with two complete sets of flight control; however, the forward set could be easily disconnected at the direction of the pilot. Directly behind the pilot' seat was a sizable baggage compartment, the variable weight of which could be easily offset via adjustments of the aircraft stabilizer. Structurally, the fuselage, wing and tail surfaces were all supported by a tubular framework made entirely of duralumin, save for numerous steel fittings. The forward section of the fuselage was partially covered by a metal sheathing; aft of the pilot's position, the remainder of the fuselage was covered using fireproofed fabric instead.

Favourable external visibility was provided by sizable windows at both the sides and front area of the cabin; specialised windshields were fitted that permitted both the pilot and passenger to stick their heads of the aircraft without being fully exposed to strong winds. The pilot's position also benefitted in this respect from the use of a transparent roof for the cabin. Active ventilation was used to regulate the climate of the cabin. The transverse frames and side walls of the fuselage were constructed in a manner that provided ample unobstructed spaces and permitted the use of relatively large doors without incurring excessive external dimensions. A total of four doors were present, two on each side of the fuselage; this was felt to increase the aircraft's safety level. A specialised device was present to overcome any difficulties in the opening of the doors during flight, better facilitating the occupant's emergency egress.

Typically, the AS.1 was powered by a single Fiat A.50 engine seven-cylinder air-cooled radial engine, capable of generating up to 100 hp at 1,900 rpm; however, numerous aircraft were furnished with alternative engines, such as the more powerful Fiat A.53 radial engine, instead. Fuel was housed inside steel fuel tanks located on the roof of the cabin, which had a capacity of 125 liters (33 gallons); an additional pair of supplementary tanks, with a capacity of 45 liters (roughly 12 gallons) each, could be installed in the cabin. The oil tank, complete with a fin-type radiator, was positioned directly underneath the forward rudder bar and had a capacity of 10 liters (2.6 gallons). Fuel is delivered to the engine via a self-regulating engine-driven pump; this is capable of consistently supplying fuel even during protracted aerobatic manoeuvres. The engine mounting was a thick duralumin sheet with to which the supporting struts were bolted into steel fittings; these had relatively large dimensions in order to amply handle the engine's vibrations. The cowling conformed to the lines of the fuselage to give a fairly slender and elegant appearance without negatively impacting the engine's cooling.

The wing structure consisted of a pair of triangular spars that were supported by a series of struts that connected to the base of the fuselage. The ribs were composed of square duralumin tubing with triangular bracing. Similar tubing was also used for the spars, which were lightened along the walls as well as reinforced where it was deemed to be necessary to do so in relation to the covering of the wing. The lightening along the spar's walls formed a girder, the lateral plates of which were braced using diaphragms of varying strength in accordance with the shearing stresses that were to be withstood. Attachments to the spars were made using numerous steel fittings that were typically riveted and soldered. These spars were mutually braced using steel wires and duralumin compression members. The spars of each half-wing were attached to the fuselage's central body via a relatively simple set of hinges instead of being rigidly embedded. A box rib that was suitably joined to a corresponding rib integral with the fuselage established an optimal junction between the wing and fuselage. Precautions were taken to suitably stiffen the wing structure against the stresses transmitted by its covering. The struts that connecting the wing spars with the fuselage were made from faired duralumin tubing that was suitably reinforced to appropriately handle all secondary stresses.

The undercarriage had a relatively wide-track gauge that provided considerable lateral stability while on the ground. The struts of the forward landing gear were equipped with long stroke oleopneumatic shock absorbers, which considerably reduced the length of the forward strut as well as being them a slender and somewhat elegant shape. As per convention amongst monoplanes of the era, the undercarriage was principally stressed in the axial direction. The axles were composed of high-tensile steel and were intentionally shaped as to ensure maximum rigidity as well as minimising weight. These axles were positioned at the ends of struts hinged to the fuselage at the planes of symmetry which reduced the lateral motion of the wheels to a minimum. Each axle incorporated a device that minimised the braking stresses imposed on the whole assembly; the brakes were controlled either by hand or via the rudder bars in order to facilitate ground movements. The tail skid consisted of three steel rods that formed a pyramid, the vertex of which was the point of contact with the ground. Two of the rods were attached to the fuselage via coaxial hinges normal to the vertical plane of symmetry of the fuselage while the third rod, which carried a shock absorber composed of rubber disks inside the fuselage, was aligned vertically. The lower end of the third rod was hinged to the top of the skid, which had a spoon-shaped show with a guiding rib. This style of skid was somewhat unorthodox and was claimed to be less prone to digging into the ground.

The aircraft was outfitted with large tail surfaces; the tail unit had a similar duralumin structure to that of the wing. The aircraft was furnished with an adjustable stabiliser, although such adjustments could only be performed while on the ground; it was otherwise easily adapted for effective control during flight. Actuation of the rudder was achieved via a pair of control cables while the elevator used a rigid control arrangement using a single lever. The stabilizer had a rectangular notch in its leading edge for the adjustment mechanism, while the elevator incorporated a pair of balancing projections towards the ends of its leading edge. The hinge axle at the leading edge had a casing composed of duralumin sheeting that matched a corresponding casing on the rear spar of the stabiliser, both having been shaped as to minimise drag. The stabiliser was structurally similar to that of the ailerons.

== Operational history ==
AS.1s were used successfully in a number of competitions and record-breaking events. In August 1929, they participated in the Challenge 1929 international contest, and in January 1930, an AS.1 piloted by Renato Donati with mechanic Gino Capannini was used to set endurance, distance, and altitude records in its class, respectively 29 h 4 min 14 s, 2,746.2 km (1,706.4 mi) and 6,782 m (22,251 ft). On 28 December 1932, Furio Niclot and Mariano Lanciani used a 127 kW (170 hp) CNA C-7, 9-cylinder radial engined example to set the seaplane altitude record in its class at 7,362 m (24,154 ft). Swapping wheels for pontoons, the same aircraft went on to set the equivalent landplane record two days later at 9,282 m (30,453 ft). Long-distance feats included flights from Rome to Mogadishu and Vercelli to Tokyo (both by Francis Lombardi and Gino Capannini) and an aerial circumnavigation of Africa by Francis Lombardi, Count Lodovico Mazzotti, and Mario Rasini who covered 27,600 km (17,150 mi) in 54 days.

The TR.1 also had competition successes in 1931 in the Giro Aereo del Piedmonte and the Giro Aereo d'Italia.

== Variants ==
- AS.1 - initial version with Fiat A.50 engine.
  - AS.1 Idro - floatplane version.
  - AS.1 Sci - ski-equipped version.
- AS.2 - version with strengthened structure and Fiat A.50 S engine.
- TR.1 - version with metal structure, shorter span wing (9.00 m; 29 ft 6.5 in) and enclosed cabin.

== Operators ==
Brazil

- Brazilian Air Force - One aircraft.

Ethiopia

- Ethiopian Air Force

Spain

- Spanish Air Force

== Specifications (AS.1) ==
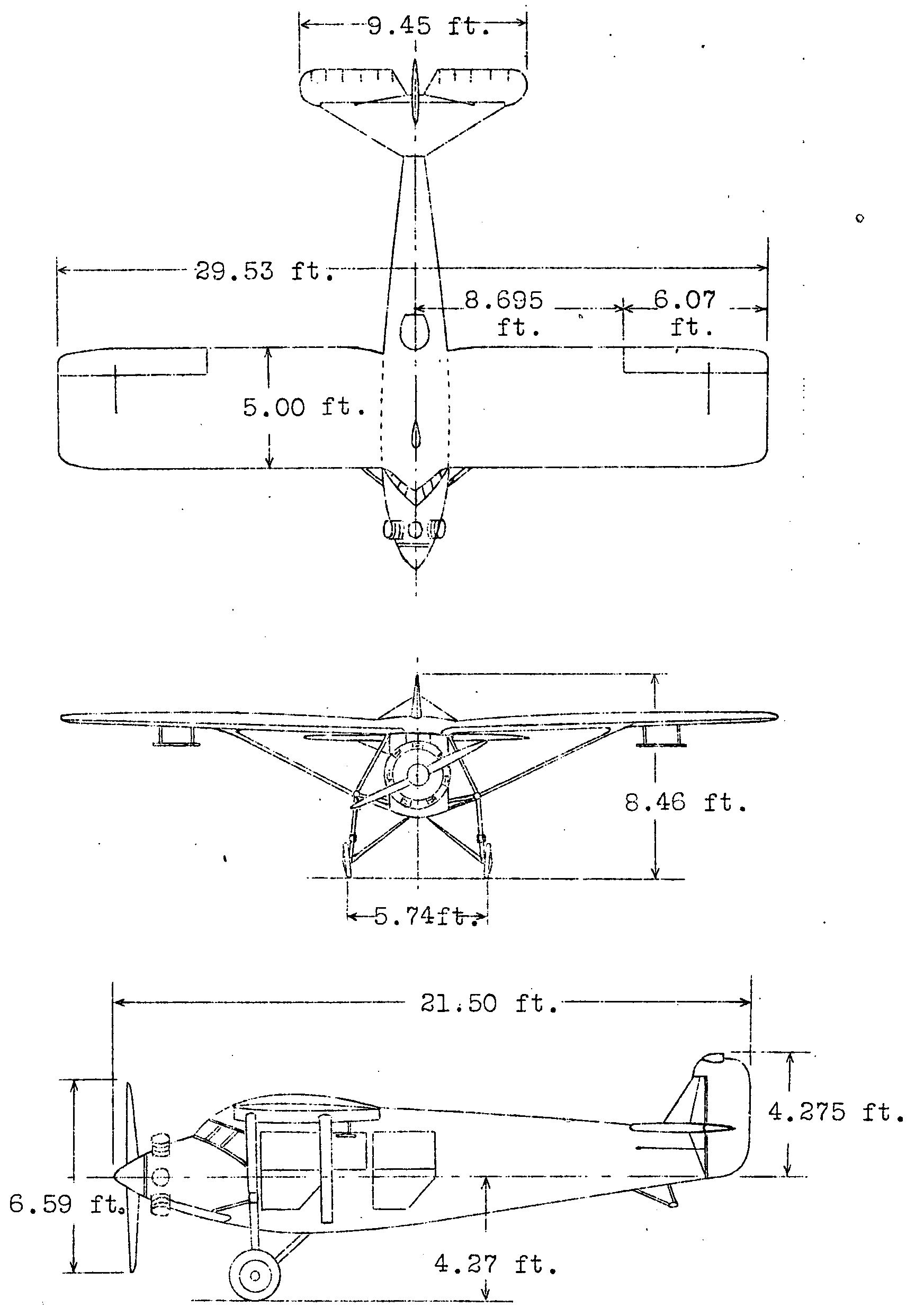
Fiat TR-1 3-view drawing from NACA Aircraft Circular No.130

Data from National Advisory Committee for Aeronautics

General characteristics

- Crew: One (pilot)
- Capacity: One passenger
- Length: 6.10 m (20 ft 0 in)
- Wingspan: 10.40 m (34 ft 2 in)
- Height: 2.53 m (8 ft 4 in)
- Wing area: 17.5 m^{2} (188 sq ft)
- Empty weight: 450 kg (990 lb)
- Gross weight: 690 kg (1,520 lb)
- Powerplant: 1 × Fiat A.50 , 67 kW (90 hp)

Performance

- Maximum speed: 158 km/h (98 mph, 85 kn)
- Range: 1,000 km (621 mi, 540 nmi)
- Service ceiling: 6,800 m (22,310 ft)
