= Caproni Ca.100 =

Ca.100
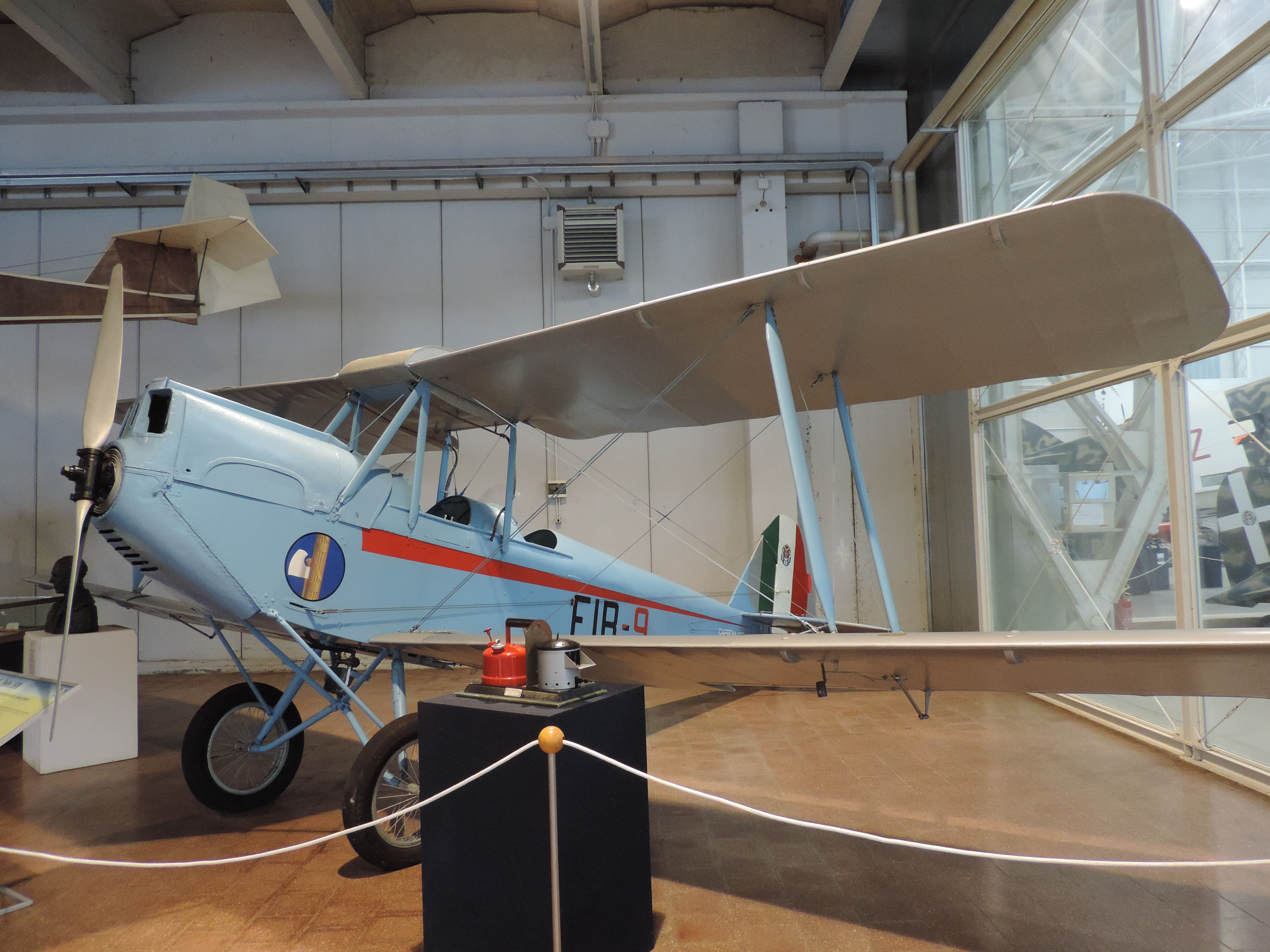
- Caproni Ca.100 trainer

General information
- Type: Trainer
- Manufacturer: Caproni
- Primary user: Regia Aeronautica
- Number built: c.700

History
- First flight: 1928

The Caproni Ca.100 was the standard trainer aircraft of the Regia Aeronautica in the 1930s. Large numbers of this tandem, two-seat, biplane were built, powered by different engines.

== Design and development ==
The Ca.100 (nicknamed Caproncino, little Caproni), was based on the de Havilland DH.60 Moth, for which Caproni had a production licence. They revised the wings so that the upper wing was slightly smaller than the lower, and also redesigned the tailplane. Otherwise, its wings followed those of the Moth in having no sweep or stagger. It was a wooden-framed, fabric-covered single-engine aircraft with a square section fuselage built around four longerons, with tandem open cockpits. It had a fixed, conventional undercarriage. Fuel was carried, Moth style, in a streamlined tank on the centre section of the upper wing. It first flew in late 1928, piloted by Domenico Antonini, at Milan-Taliedo.

Ca.100s were powered by a variety of engines. The most common of these were the 85 kW (114 hp) Isotta Fraschini Asso 80R and the 108 kW (145 hp) Colombo S.63, both six-cylinder air-cooled inline engines, and the uncowled 63 kW (84 hp) Fiat A.50 and 104 kW (139 hp) A.54 seven-cylinder radials. Other engines in the 60-100 kW (80-135 hp) range included the Walter NZ-85, Farini T.58, Fiat A.53, Fiat A.60 radials and the inline Colombo S.53, Cirrus Major, de Havilland Gipsy, de Havilland Gipsy Major engines.

== Operational history ==
The Regia Aeronautica received two prototype and 675 production Ca.100s, built by Bergamasche, Breda, C.N.A. and Macchi as well as Caproni. 30 of the Macchi-built examples were fitted with floats and designated Ca.100 Idro. The Ca.100s were mostly used as primary trainers, though some undertook liaison work.

Some aircraft were built as civilian tourers, numbering at least eight. Later they were joined on the Civil Register by retired ex-military machines.

There were exports to Peru and Portugal. Twelve Ca.100PRs, a derivative with all-metal structure, powered by a 125 hp (93 kW) Kinner B-5 radial engine were built under licence by Fábrica Nacional de Aviones Caproni Perú, a Peruvian subsidiary of Caproni from 1937. The Ca.100PRs remained in service with the Peruvian air force until 1946, when the remaining four aircraft were transferred to the Peruvian Civil Aviation School, where they remained in use until 1956.

Ca.100 was also produced by Caproni's Bulgarian subsidiary as the KB-1 Peperuda (butterfly), with seven aircraft powered by 120 hp (89 kW) Walter NZ 120 engines built in 1932, and a further two Bulgarian-built floatplanes donated to the Bulgarian government by Gianni Caproni. They were phased out of Bulgarian service due to problems with the aircraft's wooden structures within two years.

One example of the Ca.100 Idro seaplane version was used to establish a world seaplane altitude record of 5,324 m (17,467 ft) in 1931.

== Surviving aircraft ==
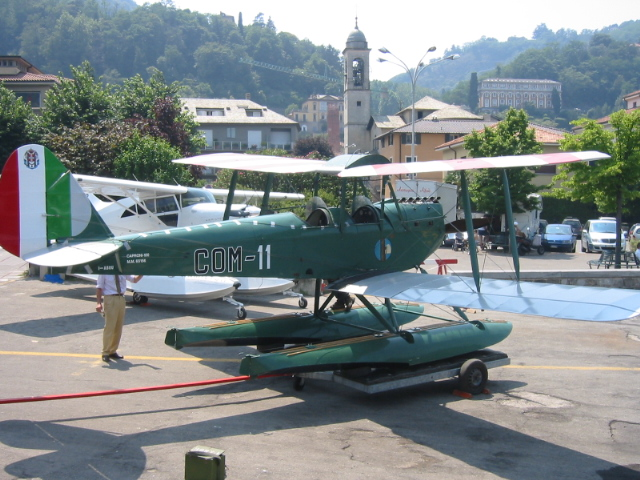
I-ABOU at Lake Como.

The last flying original landplane Ca.100, I-ABMT is ex-military, MM55194. The Aero Club Como floatplane I-ABOU, ex-MM65156, has been rebuilt after a takeoff collision in 2006, flying again in September 2010. At least one replica also flies.

== Aircraft on display ==
The Italian Air Force Museum at Vigna di Valle acquired landplane I-GTAB in May 2007; it is now marked with the registration FIR-9, appropriate to a Ca.100 serving at the Florence basic Flying School in the mid-1930s.

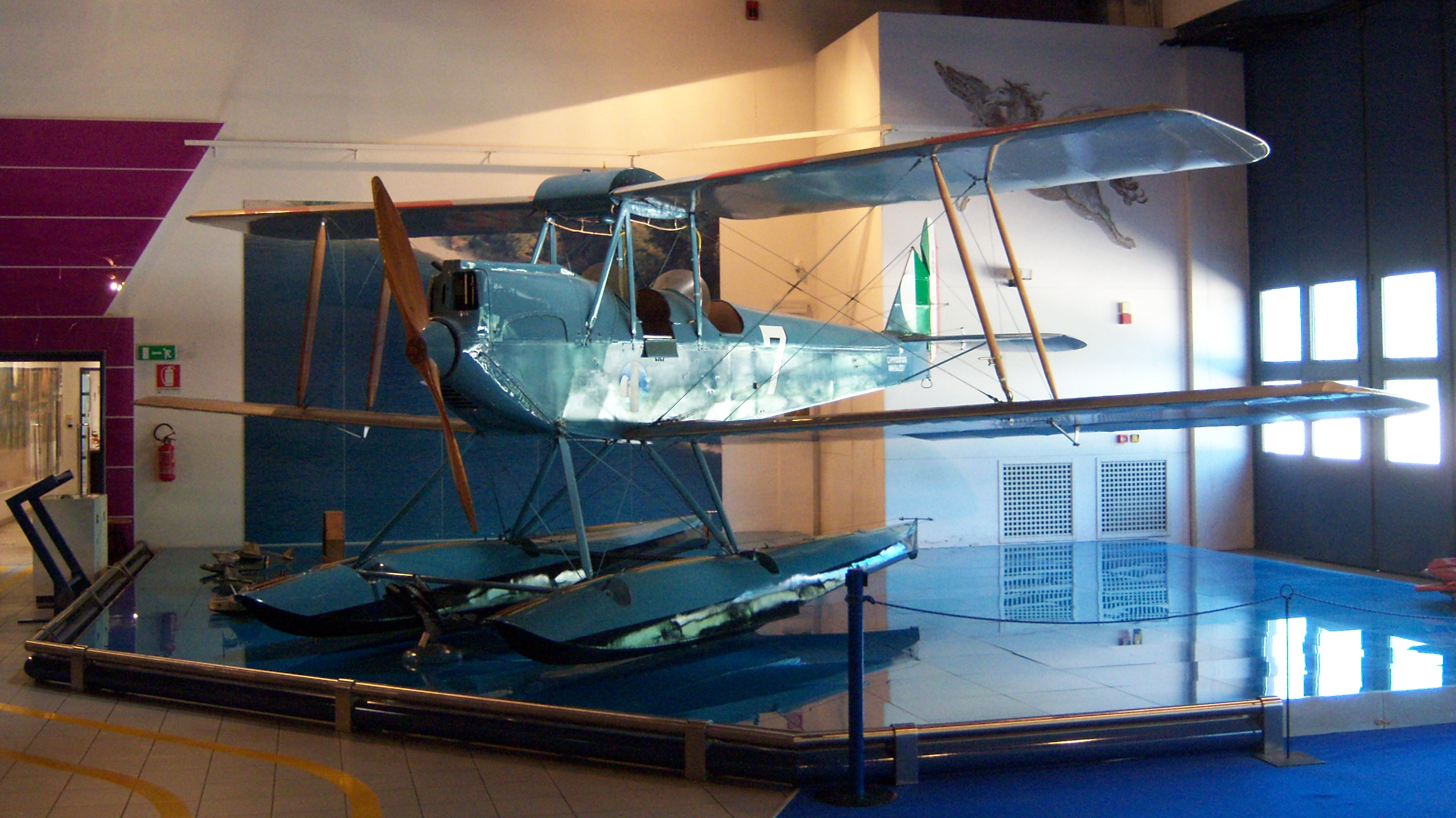
Caproni Ca.100 Idro floatplane variant in the Museo dell'Aeronautica Gianni Caproni, Trento.

Floatplane ex-I-DISC and MM56237 is in the Museo dell'Aeronautica Gianni Caproni, Trento.

Ex-I-BIZZ and MM56271 is in the Royal Saudi Air Force Museum.

== Operators ==
Austria

- Austrian Air Force

Bulgaria

- Bulgarian Air Force

Kingdom of Italy

- Regia Aeronautica

Italy

- Italian Air Force

Peru

- Peruvian Air Force

Portugal

- Portuguese Air Force - One aircraft.

Spain

- Spanish Air Force

Saudi Arabia

- Royal Saudi Air Force

== Specifications (Gipsy engine) ==
General characteristics

- Crew: two, pilot and instructor
- Length: 7.30 m (23 ft 11 in)
- Wingspan: 10.00 m (32 ft 10 in)
- Height: 2.75 m (9 ft 0 in)
- Wing area: 24.4 m^{2} (263 sq ft)
- Empty weight: 400 kg (882 lb)
- Gross weight: 560 kg (1,499 lb)
- Powerplant: 1 × de Havilland Gipsy 4-cylinder air-cooled upright inline , 63 kW (85 hp)

Performance

- Maximum speed: 165 km/h (102 mph, 89 kn)
- Range: 700 km (462 mi, 401 nmi)
- Service ceiling: 4,000 m (13,125 ft)
- Rate of climb: 1.8 m/s (354 ft/min)

== See also ==
- World Aircraft Information Files. London: Bright Star Publishing. pp. File 891 Sheet 09.

Related lists

- List of Interwar military aircraft
