= Italian Air Force Band =

- Banda musicale dell'Aeronautica Militare
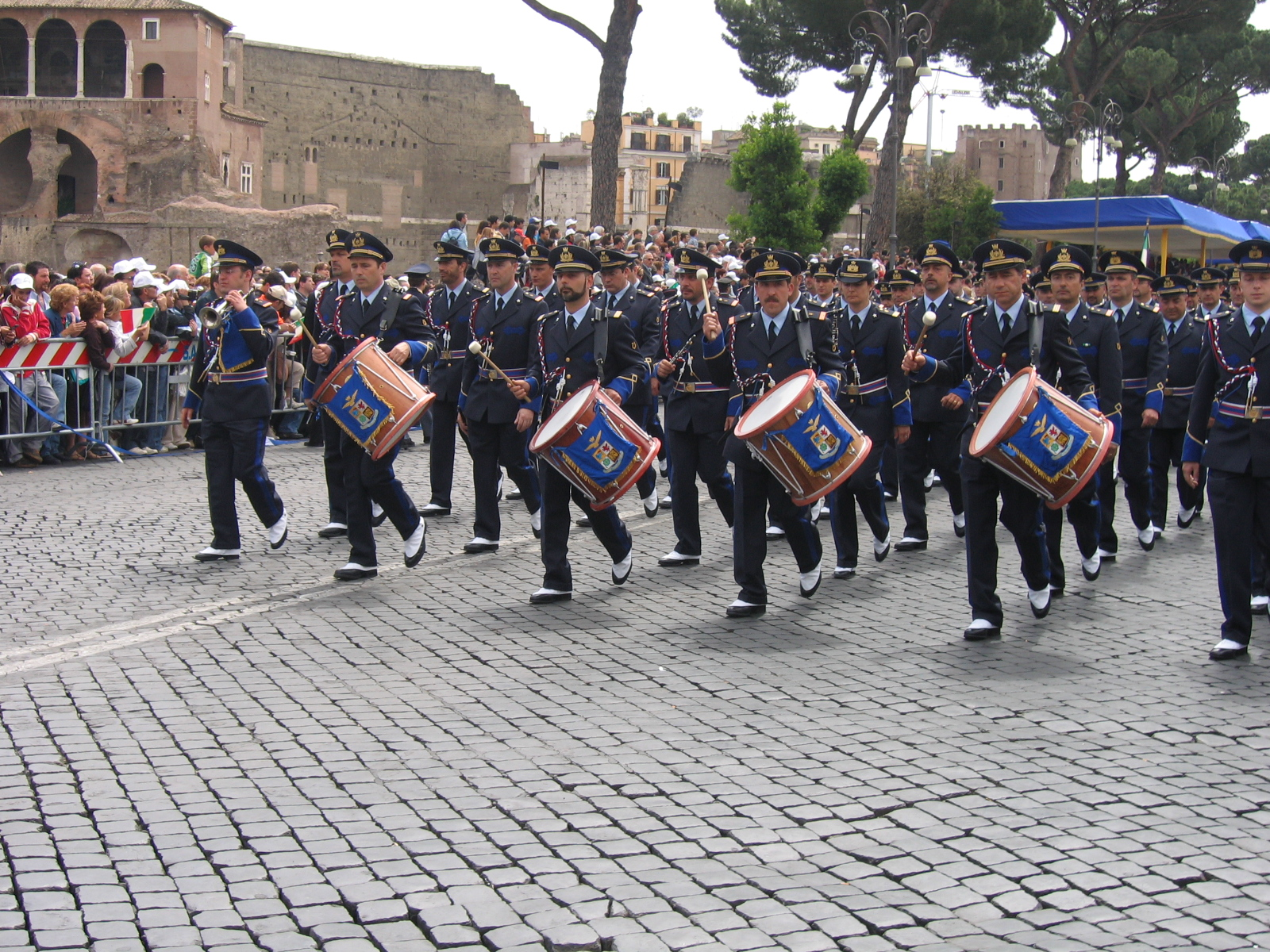
- Active: 1924; 101 years ago
- Country: Italy
- Branch: Italian Air Force
- Type: Military band
- Size: 102 members
- Headquarters: Rome

Commanders
- Current commander: major Pantaleo Leonfranco Cammarano

The Italian Air Force Band (Italian: Banda musicale dell'Aeronautica Militare) is an Italian military band representing the Italian Air Force; it is based in Rome. The band is composed of 102 non-commissioned officers and officers, as well as an archivist, in addition to the director and deputy director. When it was founded, the band was based at the 2nd Regional Area Command in Rome, until the year 1995, in which it passed its administrative dependencies to the Air Force General Affairs Department.

== History ==
The band was established by ministerial decree of the then Kingdom of Italy on 1 July 1937 with maestro Alberto Di Miniello as its first director. The same day of its founding, it also performed its first concert. At the inauguration ceremony of the Band, a sort of mystical baptism, the distinguished composer Pietro Mascagni intervened as an exceptional godfather, who directed it in the first concert. Its establishment was drawn from the Royal Decree of 19 November 1936, which ordered the establishment of a new military band. Cavour Barracks in Rome was chosen as the headquarters of the Musical Corps, a symbolic choice since it was the first Italian barracks that housed an aviation department at the beginning of the century. Subsequently, on 20 September 1937, the band was officially presented to the nation, with a concert held at the headquarters of Ente Italiano per le Audizioni Radiofoniche (the state radio). In the years between 1938 and 1940, there were numerous foreign tours by the band that included visits to Bulgaria, Spain, and Germany. In 1940, the band was invited to Belgium to perform concerts that were subsequently broadcast by radio in Brussels, in favor of Italian and German troops. Dissolved following the wartime events, the Band was reconstituted in 1944 and resumed concert activity that December.

== Activities ==
A video of the band during a Festa della Repubblica parade

Among its major musical activities, it has held concerts in New York, Buenos Aires, Rio de Janeiro, Chicago, Hamburg, Munich, Berlin, Ankara, Moscow, and Milan. In addition to the concert activity, like all Italian military bands, it also has the task of attending the arrival honor ceremonies at the Palazzo del Quirinale, alternating with other military bands. During state visits, it performs Honors music, primarily "Onori" ("Honors"), which is the term for the traditional ruffles and flourishes that precedes the national anthem. It also performs on 2 June for the Festa della Repubblica military parade, representing the Italian Air Force in the Italian Armed Forces.
