= Caproni Campini Ca.183bis =

Italian projected high-altitude fighter

Caproni Campini C.A.183bis

General information
- Type: high altitude interceptor/fighter
- Manufacturer: Caproni-Campini
- Status: One incomplete prototype
- Primary user: Kingdom of Italy / Repubblica Sociale Italiana

History
- Developed from: Caproni Campini N.1

The Caproni-Campini Ca.183bis was an Italian projected high-altitude fighter intended to have both piston and jet propulsion.

== Design and development ==
The Ca.183bis was intended to have a 1,250 hp (932 kW) Daimler-Benz DB 605 in the nose driving a six-bladed contra-rotating propeller, augmented by a secondary piston engine behind the cockpit driving a Campini compressor, expected to furnish a 100 km/h (60 mph) boost from jet thrust for an optimistic maximum speed of 740 km/h (460 mph) with a range of 2,000 km (1,200 mi). One 20 mm or 30 mm cannon was to be in the propeller hub with four more 20 mm cannon in the wings. Weight was to be 7,500 kg (16,500 lb).

The prototype was 80% complete by the time of the armistice. After Mussolini escaped from captivity with German help and became the nominal leader of the Italian Social Republic in September 1943, Italian work continued on the prototype. However, various attacks against military structures slowed the development and the prototype was probably destroyed in 1944.

== Specifications (Daimler-Benz DB605) ==
Data from

General characteristics

- Crew: one
- Wingspan: 15 m (49 ft 3 in)
- Max takeoff weight: 7,500 kg (16,535 lb)
- Powerplant: 1 × Daimler-Benz DB 605 piston engine, 930 kW (1,250 hp)
- Powerplant: 1 × Fiat A.30 piston engine, 520 kW (700 hp) driving a Campini thermo-jet engine
- Propellers: 6-bladed contra-rotating

Performance

- Maximum speed: 740 km/h (460 mph, 400 kn)
- Range: 2,000 km (1,200 mi, 1,100 nmi)

Armament

- Guns: 4x 20 mm (0.787 in) cannons in the wings and 1x 30 mm (1.181 in) or 20 mm (0.787 in) cannon firing through the hub of the contra-rotating propeller.

== See also ==
- List of jet aircraft of World War II

Related development

- Caproni Campini N1

Aircraft of comparable role, configuration, and era

- Heinkel He 112
- Mikoyan-Gurevich I-250
- Sukhoi Su-6
- Sukhoi Su-5
- Reggiane Re.2007
- Ryan FR Fireball

== Sources ==
Thompson, Jonathan (1963). Italian Civil & Military Aircraft 1930-1945 (1st ed.). New York: Aero Publishers Inc. pp. 94. ISBN 0-8168-6500-0.
