= List of jet aircraft of World War II =

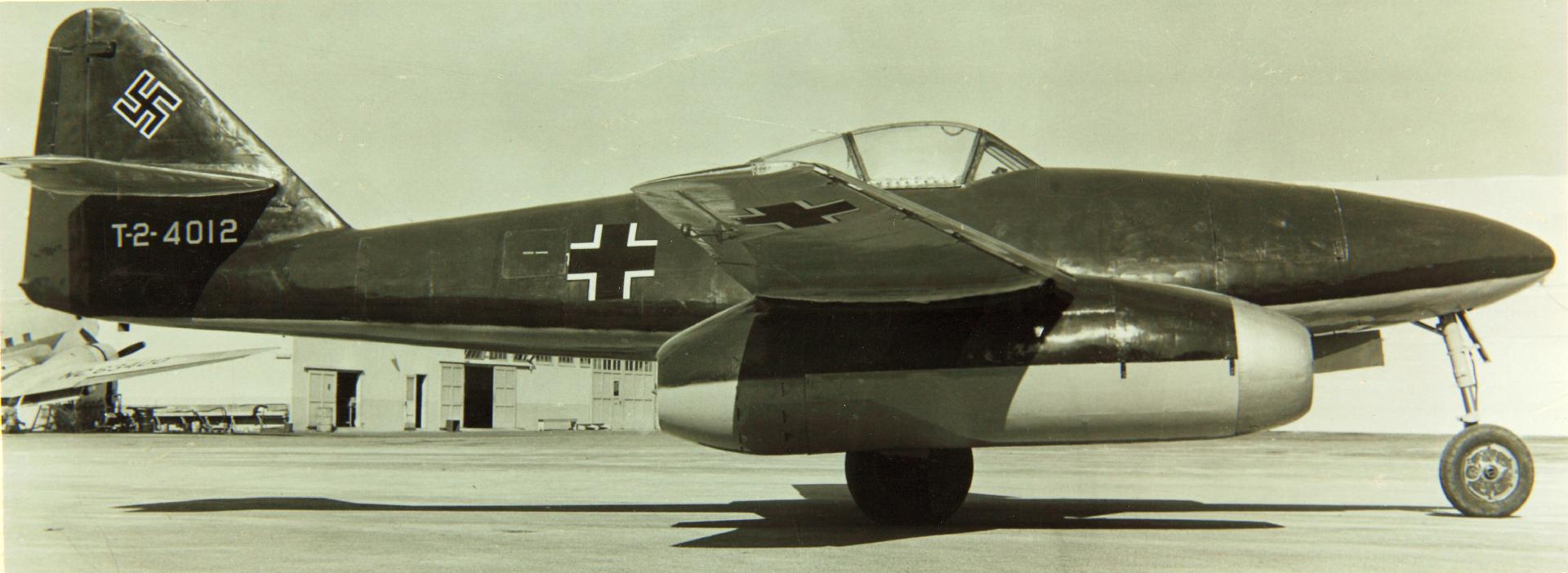
A captured Messerschmitt Me 262, the most numerous jet fighter of World War II

World War II was the first war in which jet aircraft participated in combat with examples being used on both sides of the conflict during the latter stages of the war. The first successful jet aircraft, the Heinkel He 178, flew only five days before the war started on 1 September 1939. By the end of the conflict on 2 September 1945 Germany, the United Kingdom, and the United States all had operational turbojet-powered fighter aircraft while Japan had produced, but not used, motorjet-powered kamikaze aircraft, and had tested and ordered into production conventional jets. Italy and the Soviet Union had both tested motorjet aircraft which had turbines powered by piston engines and the latter had also equipped several types of conventional piston-powered fighter aircraft with auxiliary ramjet engines for testing purposes. Germany was the only country to use jet-powered bombers operationally during the war.

This list includes only aircraft powered by turbine engines, either on their own or as part of mixed-power arrangements. Rocket-powered aircraft are not included, nor are aircraft that only flew following the end of the war. (Note: For instance, the first French jet aircraft, the Sud-Ouest Triton, was clandestinely designed during the German occupation of France, but was not constructed and flown until after the end of the war.) Aircraft which were designed but not constructed are also excluded. Production figures for aircraft used postwar include examples built after the war ended, of the same versions already flying during the war.

== Aircraft ==
Name	Origin	First flight	Type	Entered service	Number built	Notes
Arado Ar 234 Blitz	Germany	June 1943	Combat	August 1944	210+	First jet bomber but used mostly for reconnaissance. Few ever flew. Night fighter tested operationally.
Bell P-59 Airacomet	US	October 1942	Operational	September 1944	66	First USAAF jet to fly, used as trainer only.
Bell XP-83	US	February 1945	Prototype	n/a	2	Cancelled long-range escort fighter.
Caproni Campini N.1	Italy	August 1940	Prototype	n/a	2	First motorjet.
Consolidated Vultee XP-81	US	February 1945	Prototype	n/a	2	Cancelled turboprop and turbojet powered fighter.
Curtiss XF15C	US	February 1945	Prototype	n/a	3	Cancelled mixed-power fighter.
de Havilland Vampire F.1	UK	September 1943	Production	March 1946	244	Only 12 produced before VE Day; no combat service.
Douglas XBTD-2 Destroyer	US	May 1944	Prototype	n/a	2	Cancelled jet engine addition to conventional radial engine torpedo bomber
Fieseler Fi 103R Reichenberg	Germany	September 1944	Operational	October 1944	300	Manned version of the pulsejet powered V-1 flying bomb ready late 1944 but not used.
Gloster E.28/39	UK	April 1941	Prototype	n/a	2	Engine testbed and first Allied jet to fly.
Gloster Meteor F.1 & F.3	UK	March 1943	Combat	July 1944	250	First operational Allied jet. First jet to down another jet aircraft (a V-1 flying bomb).
Heinkel He 162	Germany	December 1944	Combat	February 1945	238+	Simple, inexpensive interceptor for use by semi-trained pilots (Volksjaeger); saw little service before war ended.
Heinkel He 178	Germany	August 1939	Prototype	n/a	2	First jet aircraft to fly
Heinkel He 280	Germany	September 1940	Prototype	n/a	9	First jet fighter to fly, cancelled.
Horten Ho 229	Germany	February 1945	Prototype	n/a	3	Fighter/bomber, first jet powered flying wing.
Junkers Ju 287	Germany	August 1944	Prototype	n/a	1	Testbed for multi-engine bomber design.
Lockheed P-80 Shooting Star	US	January 1944	Operational	January 1945	361	First operational US jet fighter. Four deployed during the war, two seeing limited service in Italy, but no combat.
McDonnell FD Phantom	US	January 1945	Production	July 1947	62	Postwar production, designation changed April 1946 to FH.
McDonnell TD2D Katydid	US	1942	Operational	1942	Unknown	US Navy pulsejet-powered target drone.
Messerschmitt Me 262	Germany	July 1942	Combat	June 1944	1,433	First operational jet fighter as fighter and fighter-bomber, with night-fighter, bomber, and reconnaissance versions trialled.
Messerschmitt Me 328	Germany	1944 (early)	Prototype	n/a	9	Cancelled pulsejet fighter/bomber.
Mikoyan-Gurevich I-250	USSR	March 1945	Prototype	n/a	28	Mixed-power motorjet fighter.
Nakajima Kikka	Japan	August 1945	Prototype	n/a	1 (Note: 23 additional Kikkas were near completion when the end of the war ended production.)	Jet bomber inspired by Me 262.
NAMU KDN Gorgon	US	June 1945	Prototype	n/a	9	Target drone based on Gorgon III missile.
Ryan FR Fireball	US	June 1944	Operational	March 1945	66	US Navy mixed power fighter, never saw combat.
Sukhoi Su-5	USSR	April 1945	Prototype	n/a	1	Cancelled mixed power motorjet fighter.
Yakovlev Yak-7PVRD	USSR	1944 (late)	Prototype	n/a	2	Mixed-power ramjet fighter.

== See also ==
- List of aircraft of World War II
- List of World War II military gliders
- List of rotorcraft of World War II
