= Luigi Stipa =

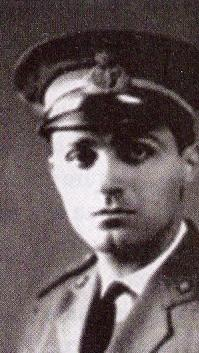
- Luigi Stipa, probably sometime in the 1920s or 1930s
- Born: 30 November 1900; Appignano del Tronto, Italy
- Died: 9 January 1992 (aged 91); Ascoli Piceno, Italy
- Occupations: Aeronautical engineer, hydraulic engineer, civil engineer, aircraft designer
- Years active: fl. ca. 1920s–1930s

Luigi Stipa (30 November 1900 – 9 January 1992) was an Italian aeronautical, hydraulic, and civil engineer and aircraft designer who invented the "intubed propeller" for aircraft, a concept that some aviation historians view as the predecessor of the turbofan engine.

== Early life and career ==
Stipa was born in Appignano del Tronto, Italy on 30 November 1900. He left school to serve in the Italian Army's Bersaglieri Corps during World War I. After the war, he earned academic degrees in aeronautical engineering, hydraulic engineering and civil engineering. He went to work for the Italian Ministry of Aeronautics, where he rose to the position of general inspector of the Engineering Division of the Italian Regia Aeronautica (Royal Air Force).

== Intubed propeller ==
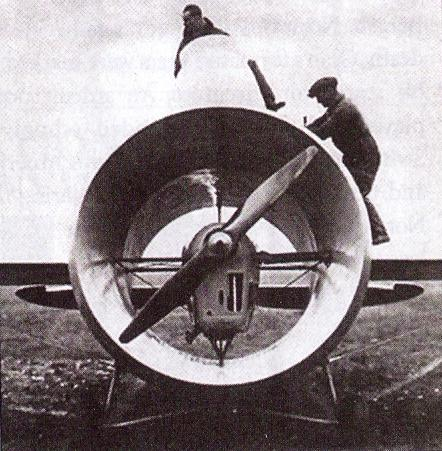
A front view of the Caproni Stipa experimental airplane in 1932, showing Stipa's "intubed propeller" design in which the propeller and engine are mounted inside a hollow tube which constitutes the airplane's fuselage.

In the 1920s, Stipa applied his study of hydraulic engineering to develop a theory of how to make aircraft more efficient as they traveled through the air. Noting that in fluid dynamics—in accordance with Bernoulli's principle—a fluid's velocity increases as the diameter of a tube it is passing through decreases, Stipa believed that the same principle could be applied to air flow to make an aircraft's engine more efficient by directing its propeller wash through a Venturi tube in a design he termed an "intubed propeller". In his concept, the fuselage of a single-engined airplane designed around an intubed propeller would be constructed as a tube, with the propeller and engine nacelle inside the tube, and therefore within the fuselage. The propeller would be of the same diameter as the tube, and its slipstream would exit the tube via the opening at the tube's trailing edge at the rear of the fuselage.

Stipa spent years studying the idea mathematically, eventually determining that the Venturi tube's inner surface needed to be shaped like an airfoil in order to achieve the greatest efficiency. He also determined the optimum shape of the propeller, the most efficient distance between the leading edge of the tube and the propeller, and the best rate of revolution of the propeller. He appears to have intended the intubed propeller for use in large, multi-engine, flying wing aircraft—for which he produced several designs—but saw the construction of an experimental single-engine prototype aircraft as the first step in proving the concept.

Stipa published his ideas in the Italian aviation journal Rivista Aeronautica ("Aeronautical Review"), then asked the Air Ministry to build a prototype aircraft to prove his concept. Eager for propaganda opportunities to highlight Italian achievements in technology to the world, and particularly interested in aviation advances, the Italian Fascist government approved of the venture, and contracted with the Caproni Aviation Corporation to build the prototype in 1932.

== The Stipa-Caproni ==
The prototype, named the Stipa-Caproni, (Note: Guttman refers to the Stipa-Caproni as the "Caproni Stipa" throughout his March 2010 Aviation History article.) first flew on October 7, 1932. Remarkably ungainly in appearance, the plane nonetheless proved Stipa's concept in that its intubed propeller increased its engine's efficiency, and the airfoil shape of the tube gave it an improved rate of climb compared to conventional aircraft of similar engine power and wing loading. The Stipa-Caproni also had a very low landing speed and was much quieter than conventional aircraft. Its rudder and elevators were mounted in the propeller's slipstream in the opening at the trailing edge of the tube in order to improve handling, and this configuration gave the aircraft handling characteristics that made it very stable in flight.

The Stipa-Caproni's great drawback was that the intubed propeller design created so much aerodynamic drag that most of the design's benefits in efficiency were negated by the drag. However, Stipa viewed the Stipa-Caproni as a mere testbed, and probably did not believe that the intubed propeller's aerodynamic drag problem would be significant in the various large, multi-engine flying wing aircraft he had designed.

After the Caproni company completed initial testing of the Stipa-Caproni, the Regia Aeronautica took control of it and conducted a brief series of additional tests, but did not develop it further because the Stipa-Caproni offered no performance improvement over aircraft of conventional design.

== Stipa's later work and influence ==
Despite the lack of Regia Aeronautica interest in developing the intubed propeller concept further, the Italian government publicized the success of Stipa's idea. Stipa patented the intubed propeller in 1938 in Germany, Italy, and the United States, and his work was published in France, Germany, Italy, the United Kingdom, and the United States, where the National Advisory Committee for Aeronautics studied it. The Regia Aeronautica's tests also sparked academic interest in the intubed propeller.

France in the 1930s based its ANF Les Mureaux BN.4 advanced night bomber design on a multi-engine intubed-propeller Stipa design, although the BN.4 was cancelled in 1936 before the first aircraft could be built. In Germany in 1934, Ludwig Kort designed the Kort nozzle, a ducted fan similar to Stipa's intubed propeller and still in use, and the German Heinkel T fighter design bore a similarity to Stipa's concepts. In Italy, none of Stipa's flying wing designs with intubed propellers ever were built, but the Caproni Campini N.1, an experimental but impractical advanced derivative of the intubed propeller idea powered by a motorjet, appeared in 1940.

Stipa himself believed that he deserved the credit for inventing the jet engine via his intubed propeller design, and claimed that the pulse jet engine the Germans employed on the V-1 flying bomb of World War II violated his intubed propeller patent in Germany, although the pulse-jet engine was not in fact closely related to his ideas.

Stipa died on 9 January 1992, embittered over never having received what he viewed as his just recognition for inventing the jet engine. Some aviation historians do at least partially agree with Stipa, noting that the modern turbofan engine has features which show it to be the descendant of his intubed propeller concept.
