= Jet aircraft =

Aircraft class powered by jet propulsion engines

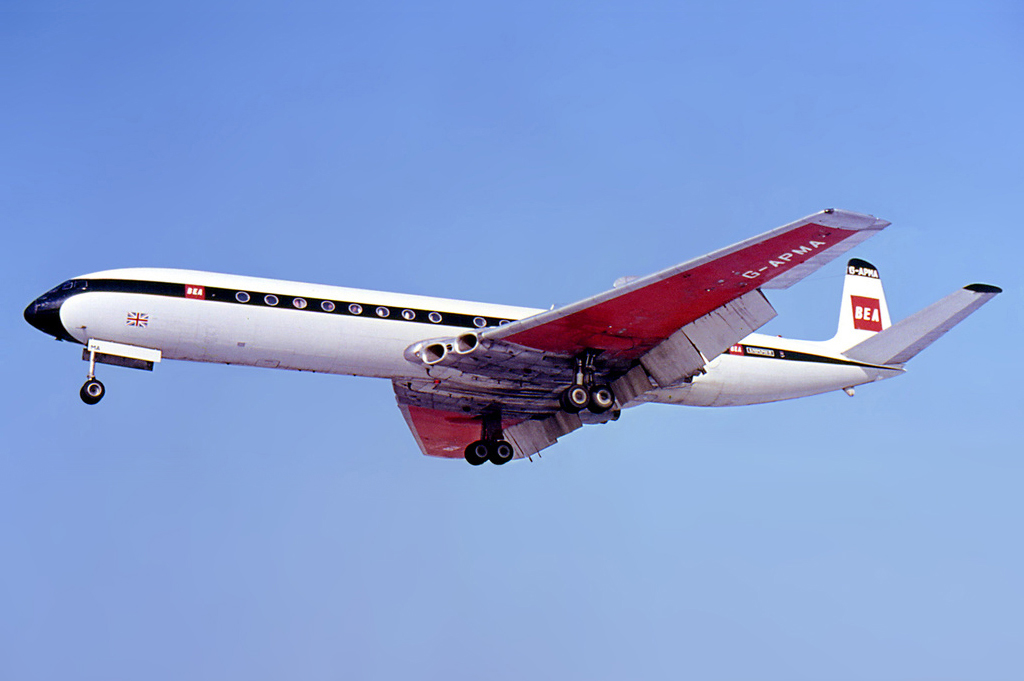
A British European Airways de Havilland Comet, the world's first jet airliner entered service in 1952, this later Comet 4B shown in 1969

A jet aircraft (or simply jet) is an aircraft propelled by one or more jet engines. Jets are nearly always fixed-wing aircraft, though a wide range of different types of jet aircraft exists – both for civilian and military purposes.

Most jet aircraft need to fly at high speeds – either supersonic, or just below the speed of sound (transonic) in order to achieve efficient flight. They typically cruise around Mach 0.8 (981 km/h; 610 mph), and at altitudes around 10,000–15,000 m (33,000–49,000 ft) or higher, where jet engines operate most efficiently. This contrasts with propeller-driven aircraft, which achieve peak efficiency at much lower speeds and altitudes.

Jet aircraft are usually designed using the Whitcomb area rule, which states that the total area of the cross-section of an aircraft must be approximately the same as that of a Sears–Haack body. The application of this rule minimizes the production of shockwaves, which waste energy.

Frank Whittle, an English inventor and RAF officer, began development of a viable jet engine in 1928, while Hans von Ohain in Germany began to independently work on similar concepts in the early 1930s. Thus, in August of 1939, the world's first jet aircraft, the Heinkel He 178, took its maiden flight.

== History ==
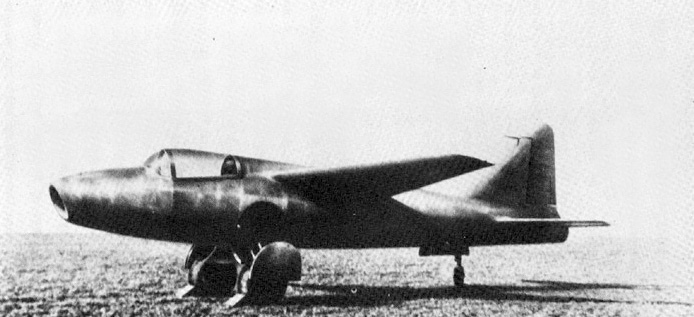
The Heinkel He 178 was the first aircraft to fly on turbojet power, in August 1939

After the first powered aircraft took flight, a multitude of jet designs and approaches were suggested. For example, René Lorin, O. Morise, and H. S. Harris all proposed different systems for creating a jet efflux. Additionally, during the 1920s and 1930s, a variety of motorjet, turboprop, pulsejet and rocket powered aircraft were designed.

Rocket engine research had been underway in Germany, and in 1928 the Lippisch Ente, which had previously been flown as a glider, became the first aircraft to fly using rocket power. The next year, in 1929, the Opel RAK.1 became the first purpose-built rocket aircraft to fly.

The turbojet was independently developed in the 1930s by Frank Whittle and, later, Hans von Ohain. The first turbojet aircraft to fly was the Heinkel He 178, on August 27, 1939 in Rostock (Germany), powered by von Ohain's design. However, "creep" (metal fatigue caused by the high temperatures within the engine) caused the engine to burn out quickly. Von Ohain's design, an axial-flow engine, as opposed to Whittle's centrifugal flow engine, was eventually adopted by most manufacturers by the 1950s.

The first jet-propelled aircraft to gain public attention was the Italian Caproni Campini N.1 motorjet prototype, which flew on August 27, 1940. Secondo Campini began development of the motorjet in 1932. This design differed from a true turbojet in that the turbine was driven by a piston engine, rather than combustion of the turbine gases.

The British experimental Gloster E.28/39 took its first flight on May 15, 1941, powered by Sir Frank Whittle's turbojet, and the United States Bell XP-59A flew on October 1, 1942, using of a version of the Whittle engine built by General Electric.

The Gloster Meteor was the first production jet. The prototype for this jet was first flown on March 5, 1943, and the first produced aircraft on January 12, 1944.

== Types of jet aircraft ==
=== Military jet aircraft ===
The Messerschmitt Me 262 (Me 262) was the first operational jet fighter, entering service on April 19, 1944. Up to 1,400 Me 262 were produced, with 300 going into combat. One Me 262 scored the first combat victory for jet fighters on July 26, 1944, but the Me 262 squadrons became operational too late to have significant effects on the outcome of World War II.

Around this time, mid 1944, the United Kingdom's Meteor was being used for defense of the UK against the V-1 flying bomb– the V-1 itself being a pulsejet-powered aircraft and direct ancestor of the cruise missile. This same year, Germany introduced the Arado Ar 234 jet reconnaissance and bomber aircraft into service (though primarily used in the former role), along with the Heinkel He 162 Spatz single-jet light fighter appearing later in the year.

USSR tested its own Bereznyak-Isayev BI-1 in 1942, but the project was scrapped by leader Joseph Stalin in 1945. The Imperial Japanese Navy also developed jet aircraft in 1945, including the Nakajima J9Y Kikka, a modified, and slightly smaller version of the Me 262 that had folding wings. By the end of 1945, the US had introduced their first jet fighter, the Lockheed P-80 Shooting Star, into service and the UK its second fighter design, the de Havilland Vampire.

The US introduced the North American B-45 Tornado, their first jet bomber, into service in 1948. It was capable of carrying nuclear weapons, but was used for reconnaissance over Korea. On November 8, 1950, during the Korean War, United States Air Force Lt. Russell J. Brown, flying in a Lockheed F-80 Shooting Star, intercepted two North Korean MiG-15s near the Yalu River and shot them down in the first jet-to-jet dogfight in history. The UK put the English Electric Canberra into service in 1951 as a light bomber. It was designed to fly higher and faster than any interceptor.

The fastest military jet aircraft was the SR-71 Blackbird at Mach 3.35 (3,661 km/h (2,275 mph)).

=== Commercial jet aircraft ===
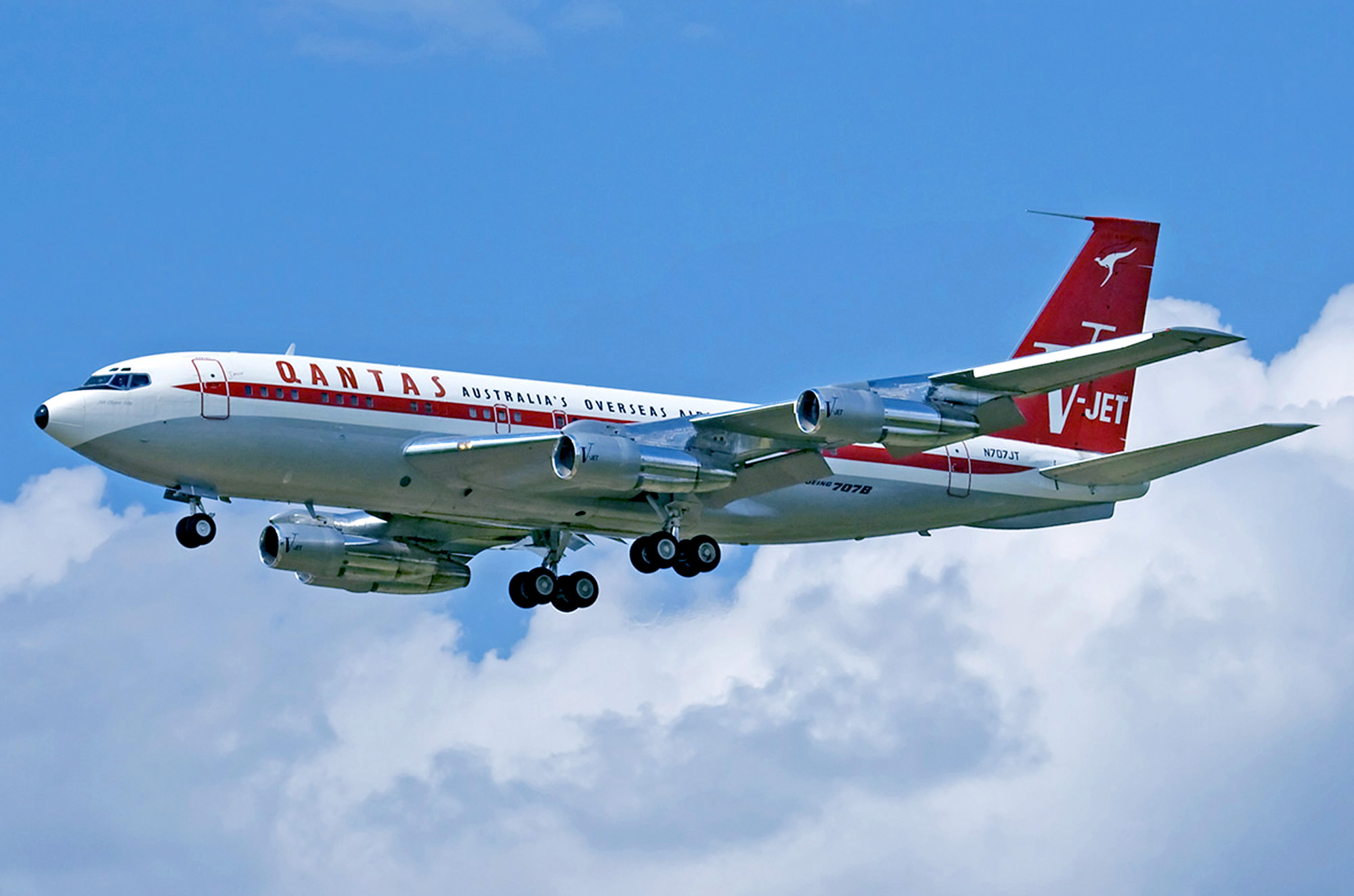
The Boeing 707 popularised commercial jet travel

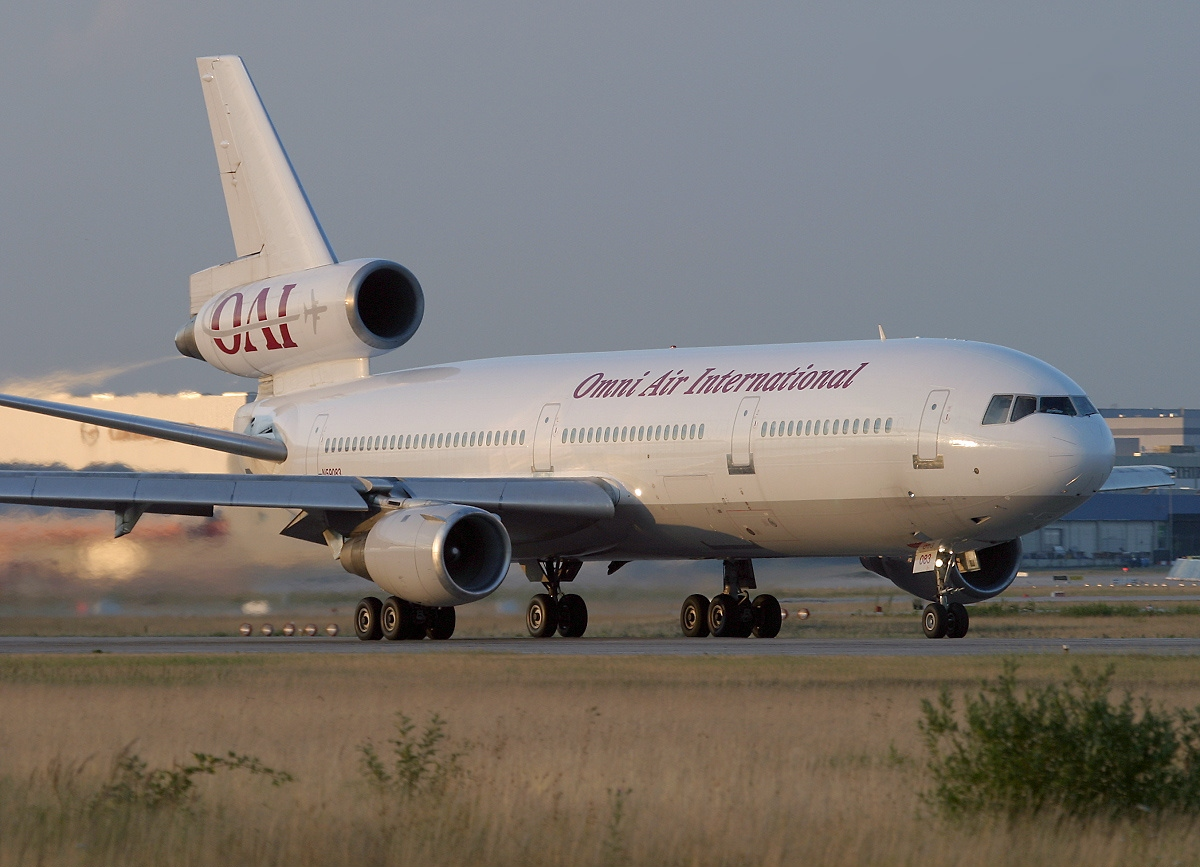
An Omni, McDonnell Douglas DC-10 in July 2003, an example of a trijet configuration

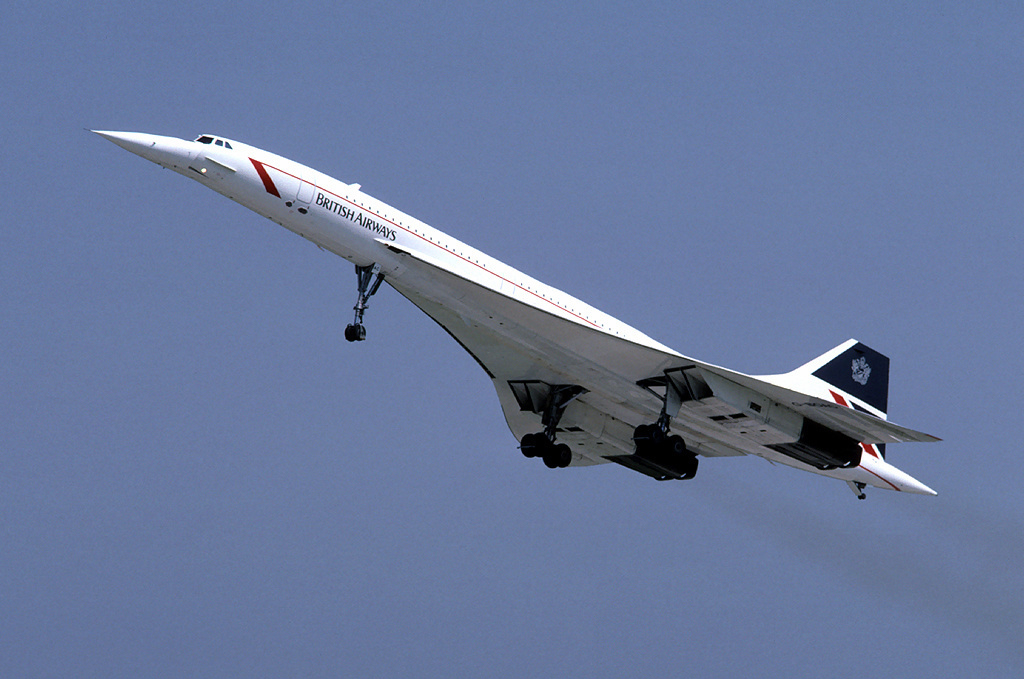
The Concorde was the longest running commercial SST providing service from 1976 to 2003

The first commercial jet service was operated in 1952 by BOAC. This service flew from London to Johannesburg, using the de Havilland Comet jetliner. The Comet travelled faster and higher than propeller aircraft, and provided a quieter and smoother ride for passengers. However, due to a design defect, and use of aluminum alloys, the aircraft suffered catastrophic metal fatigue, leading to several crashes. Due to these accidents, the Boeing 707 gained the opportunity to enter service in 1958 and dominate the market for civilian airliners. The 707's underslung engines were found to be advantageous in the event of a propellant leak, making its visual appearance contrast that of the Comet, which had blended wings containing hidden engines. The 707's overall shape is similar to that of contemporary aircraft, with marked commonality still evident today. Some examples of this include the Boeing 737 (fuselage) and Airbus A340 (single deck, swept wing, four below-wing engines).

Turbofan aircraft, which had greater fuel efficiency, began entering service in the 1950s and 1960s, and eventually became the most commonly used type of jet.

The Tu-144 supersonic transport was the fastest commercial jet aircraft at Mach 2.35 (2,503 km/h (1,555 mph)). It went into service in 1975, but was withdrawn from commercial service shortly afterwards. The Mach 2 Concorde entered service in 1976 and flew for 27 years.

=== Other ===
Though the term "jet aircraft" is commonly used to denote gas-turbine-based airbreathing jet engines, rockets and scramjets are both also propelled by jet propulsion.

Cruise missiles are single-use unmanned jet aircraft, powered predominantly by ramjets, turbojets, or turbofans, but they often have a rocket propulsion system for initial propulsion.

The fastest airbreathing jet aircraft is the unmanned X-43 scramjet at around Mach 9–10.

The fastest manned (rocket) aircraft is the X-15 at Mach 6.85.

The Space Shuttle, while faster than the X-43 or X-15, was not regarded as an aircraft during ascent, since it was carried ballistically by rocket thrust, rather than the air. Upon re-entry to Earth, it was classified (like a glider) as an unpowered aircraft. The first flight took place in 1981.

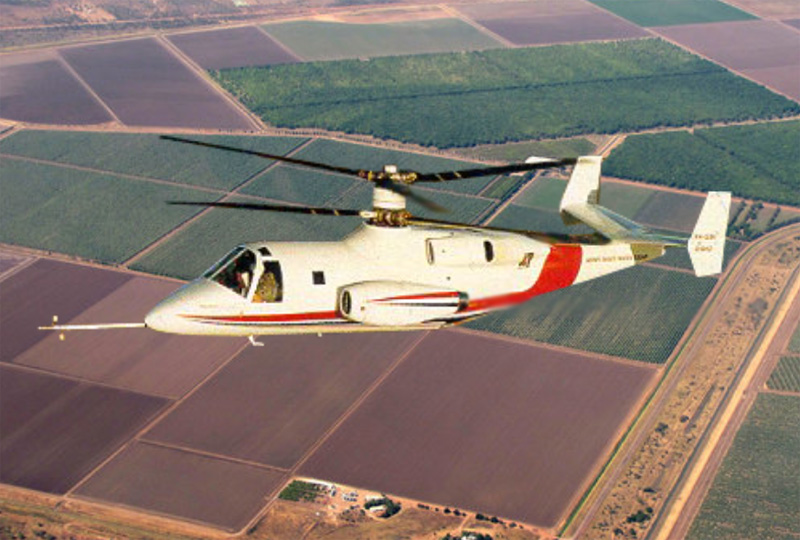
The Sikorsky S-69 was a compound helicopter with auxiliary turbojets

The Bell 533 (1964), Lockheed XH-51 (1965), and Sikorsky S-69 (1977–1981) are examples of compound helicopter designs where jet exhaust added to forward thrust. The Hiller YH-32 Hornet and Fairey Ultra-light Helicopter were among many helicopters where the rotors were driven by tip jets.

Jet-powered wingsuits exist – powered by model aircraft jet engines – but can only fly short durations and need to be launched at height.

== Jet engines ==
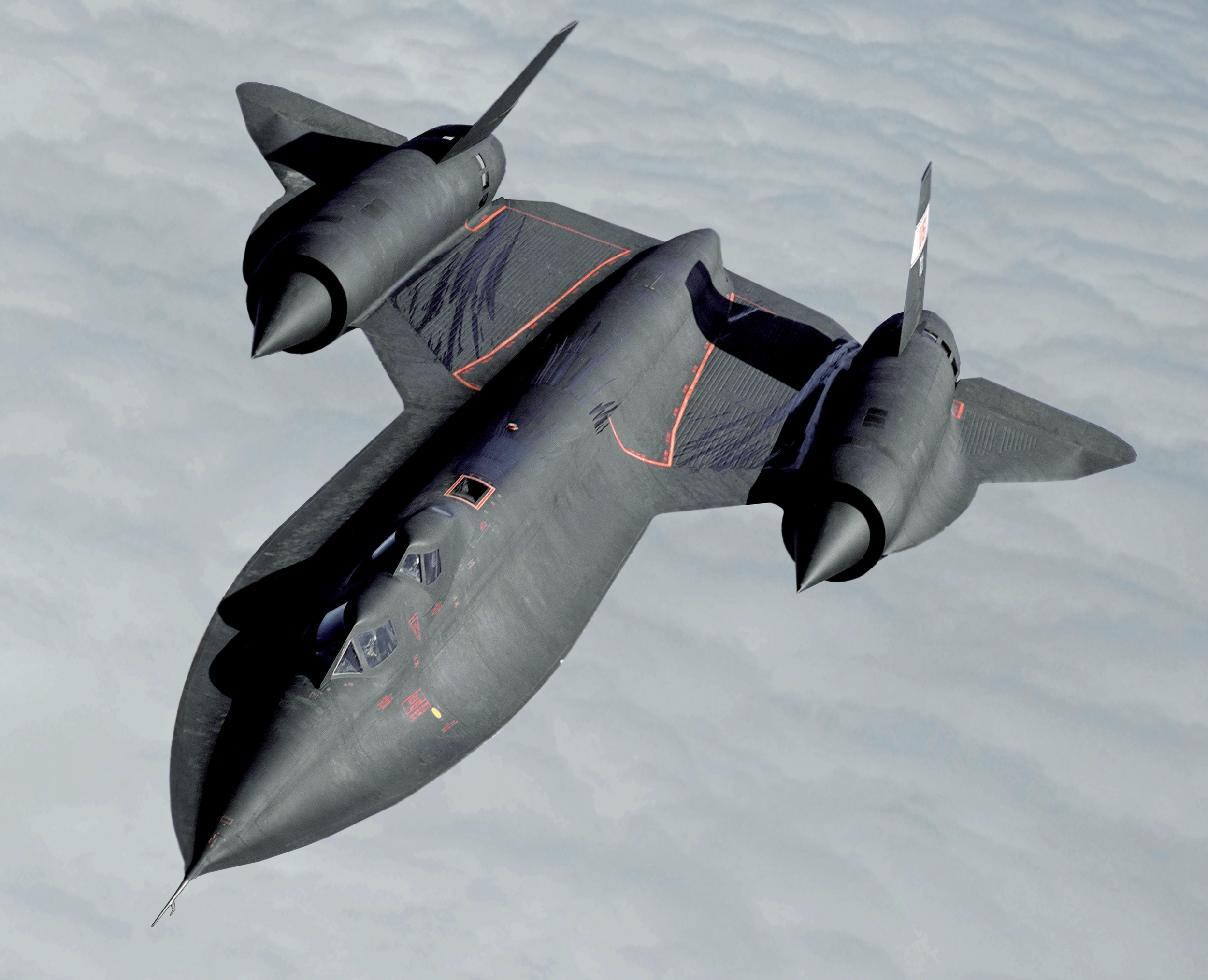
The Lockheed SR-71 was one of the fastest jets, flying at Mach 3.35 (3,661 km/h; 2,275 mph)

Several types of engines operate by expelling hot gas:

- turbojet
- turbofan
- ramjet
- turboprop

Each different kind of engine achieves a different purpose.

Turbojets have a high exhaust speed, and low frontal cross-section, making them best suited to supersonic flight. Although once widely used, they are relatively inefficient compared to turboprop and turbofans for subsonic flight. The last major aircraft to use turbojets were the Concorde and the Tu-144 supersonic transports.

Low bypass turbofans have a lower exhaust speed than turbojets, and are mostly used for high sonic, transonic, and low supersonic speeds. High bypass turbofans are relatively efficient, and are used by subsonic aircraft, such as airliners.

== Propulsive efficiency ==
In aircraft overall propulsive efficiency $\eta$ is the efficiency, in percent, with which the energy contained in a vehicle's propellant is converted into useful energy, to replace losses due to air drag, gravity, and acceleration. It can also be stated as the proportion of the mechanical energy actually used to propel the aircraft. It is always less than 100% because of kinetic energy loss to the exhaust, and less-than-ideal efficiency of the propulsive mechanism, whether a propeller, a jet exhaust, or a fan. In addition, propulsive efficiency is greatly dependent on air density and airspeed.

Mathematically, it is represented as $\eta = \eta_\text{c} \eta_\text{p}$, where $\eta_\text{c}$ is the cycle efficiency, and $\eta_\text{p}$ is the propulsive efficiency. The cycle efficiency, in percent, is the proportion of energy that can be derived from the energy source that is converted to mechanical energy by the engine.

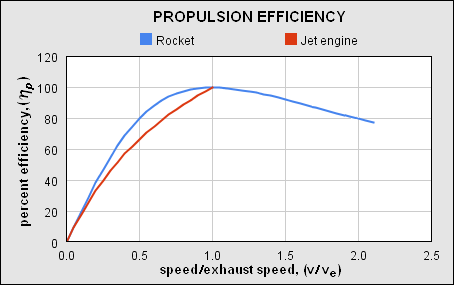
Dependence of the propulsive efficiency ($\eta_\text{p}$) upon the vehicle speed/exhaust speed ratio (v/c) for rocket and jet engines

For jet aircraft the propulsive efficiency (essentially energy efficiency) is highest when the engine emits an exhaust jet at a speed that is the same as, or nearly the same as, the vehicle velocity. The exact formula for air-breathing engines as given in the literature, is
$$\eta_\text{p} = \frac{2}{1 + \dfrac{c}{v}},$$
where c is the exhaust speed, and v is the speed of the aircraft.

== Range ==
For a long-range jet operating in the stratosphere, the speed of sound is constant, hence flying at fixed angle of attack and constant Mach number causes the aircraft to climb, without changing the value of the local speed of sound. In this case:
$$V = aM,$$
where $M$ is the cruise Mach number, and $a$ the local speed of sound. The range equation can be shown to be
$$R = \frac{aM}{c_T} \frac{C_L}{C_D} \ln\frac{W_1}{W_2},$$
which is known as the Breguet range equation after the French aviation pioneer Louis Charles Breguet.

== See also ==
- Coanda-1910 – Aircraft
- Commercial aviation – Transport system providing air transport for hire
- Contrail – Long, thin artificial clouds that sometimes form behind aircraft
- Jet airliner – Passenger aircraft powered by jet engines
- Jet noise – Noise caused by jets
- Jumbo jet – Airliner with two aisles
- Very light jet – Class of small jet aircraft under 10,000 lb.
- List of jet aircraft of World War II
