= Kholshchevnikov VRDK =

Motorjet engine

VRDK
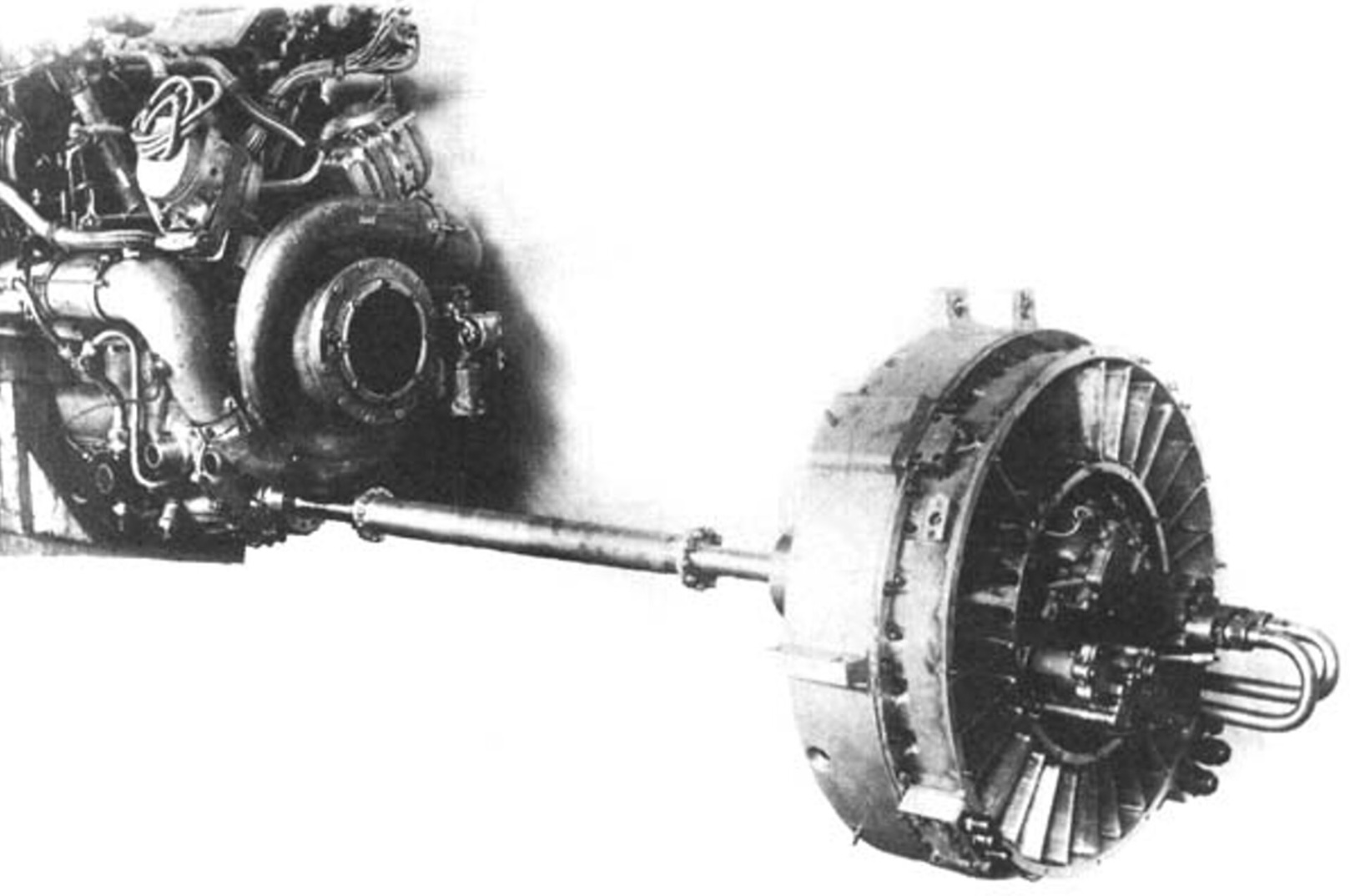
- Type: Motorjet
- National origin: Soviet Union
- Manufacturer: Central Institute of Aviation Motors
- Designer: Kholshchevnikov
- Built by: Plant No. 381
- First run: 1945
- Major applications: Mikoyan-Gurevich I-250

The Kholshchevnikov VRDK (Vozdushno-Reaktivniy Dopolnitelniy Kompressor) (Russian: "Jet-Propelled Auxiliary Compressor”) (Note: Expansion of acroynm comes from the book MiG: Fifty years of secret aircraft design. Some sources indicate that the "D" in VRDK stood for "dvigatel," (Russian: "engine").), or E-3020, was a motorjet developed in the Soviet Union during World War II. The VRDK was designed to give fighter aircraft a ten-minute performance boost during combat.

VRDK boosters were built in small numbers for use in the Mikoyan-Gurevich I-250 and Sukhoi Su-5 mixed propulsion fighter aircraft. Both aircraft made their first flights in 1945, shortly before the end of World War II.

Interest in VRDK technology declined quickly after World War II as Soviet designers focused on the development of turbojet powered fighter aircraft.

== Design and development ==
Design work on VRDK technology started in 1941 at the Central Aerohydrodynamic Institute with the goal of developing a motorjet where a piston engine would be combined with an axial flow compressor. From 1943 work was handed over to the Central Institute of Aviation Motors where design studies separated into two branches. One branch of research headed by A.I Tolstov focused on diesel engines the other headed by K.V Kholshchevnikov(ru) focused on spark ignition engines.

In May 1944 the GKO (state committee for defence) ordered the major aircraft design bureaus to start developing aircraft that used a piston engine as their primary powerplant augmented with a small rocket or jet engine booster for short bursts of speed. The Mikoyan-Gurevich and Sukhoi design bureaus opted to use the VRDK developed by Kholshchevnikov's team which was formally known as the E-3020 while being informally known as the Kholshchevnikov accelerator.

A diagram of the VRDK as installed in the I-250

Both the Sukhoi Su-5 and Mikoyan-Gurevich I-250 used a single 1,230 kW (1,650 hp) Klimov VK-107 engine to drive a propeller and the VRDK’s single stage axial flow compressor. The compressor was driven from a step-up gearbox and could be engaged/disengaged by the pilot using a clutch mechanism which connected it to the piston engine via a shaft. Intake air to the compressor was supplied from a duct at the front of the aircraft. A small proportion of the compressed air was diverted and used to supercharge the engine, while the remainder passed over a radiator. The heated, compressed air leaving the radiator was then fed to an afterburner before exiting through a nozzle at the rear of the aircraft. To protect the pilot and airframe, the VRDK was cooled during operation by water from a 78 L (20.6 US gal) tank mounted in the fuselage.

When tested in the I-250, the thrust from the VRDK was 344 kg (758 lb) and the combined output from the piston engine + VRDK was calculated to be the equivalent of 1,976 kW (2,650 hp).

The VRDK was designed to operate for 10 minutes continuously and provide a speed increase of 90 km/h (56 mph). Both the Su-5 and the I-250 had top speeds faster than contemporary piston engined fighters but slower than early jet fighters such as the Gloster Meteor and Messerschmitt Me 262.

Only small numbers of Soviet motorjet aircraft were built and none saw service during World War II. After the war interest in motorjets quickly declined as the Soviets acquired German and British turbojet engines. Research, development and flight testing of Soviet motorjet aircraft had finished by 1950.

== Applications ==
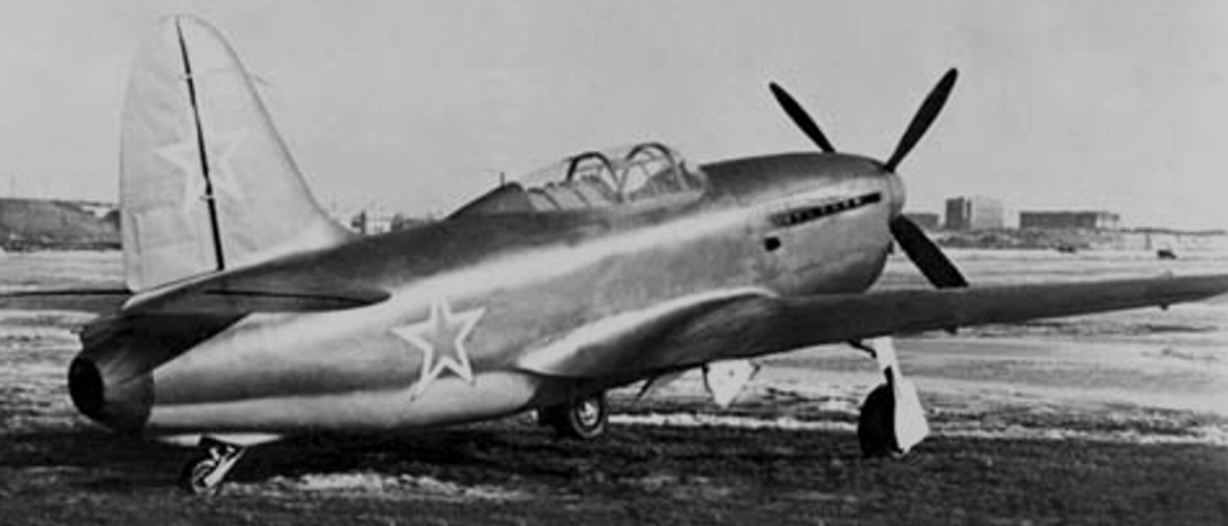
Sukhoi Su-5

- Mikoyan-Gurevich I-250
- Sukhoi Su-5

== Specifications ==
Data from Harkins. Performance figures are for the VRDK only. In practice the VRDK could not be operated without being coupled to an external driver.

==== General characteristics ====
- Type: Motorjet
- Length: ~8 m (26.2 ft) including ducting
- Diameter: ~0.7 m (2.3 ft)
- Dry weight: 140.9 kg (310.6 lb) VRDK only

==== Components ====
- Compressor: Single-stage axial
- Combustors: Afterburner ring with seven nozzles
- Fuel type: Avgas

==== Performance ====
- Maximum thrust: 344 kg (758 lb)
- Fuel consumption: 206 kg (454 lb) for 10 minutes of flight
- Thrust-to-weight ratio: 2.44

== See also ==
- Ishikawajima Tsu-11
- Caproni Campini N.1
