= Caproni Campini N.1 =

Experimental Italian jet aircraft of the 1930/40s

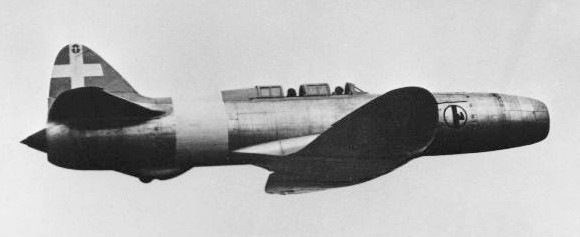
- A Caproni Campini N.1 in flight. The canopies are left open to cool down the cockpit.

General information
- Type: Experimental aircraft
- National origin: Italy
- Manufacturer: Caproni
- Designer: Secondo Campini
- Status: Prototypes only
- Primary user: Regia Aeronautica
- Number built: 2

History
- First flight: 27 August 1940
- Developed into: Caproni Campini Ca.183bis

The Caproni Campini N.1, also known as the C.C.2, is an experimental jet aircraft built in the 1930s by Italian aircraft manufacturer Caproni. The N.1 first flew in 1940 and was briefly regarded as the first successful jet-powered aircraft in history, before news emerged of the German Heinkel He 178's first flight a year earlier.

During 1931, Italian aeronautics engineer Secondo Campini submitted his studies on jet propulsion, including a proposal for a so-called thermo-jet to power an aircraft. Following a high-profile demonstration of a jet-powered boat in Venice, Campini was rewarded with an initial contract issued by the Italian government to develop and manufacture his proposed engine. During 1934, the Regia Aeronautica (the Italian Air Force) granted its approval to proceed with the production of two jet-powered prototype aircraft. To produce this aircraft, which was officially designated as the N.1, Campini formed an arrangement with the larger Caproni aviation manufacturer.

The N.1 is powered by a motorjet, a type of jet engine in which the compressor is driven by a conventional reciprocating engine. On 27 August 1940, the first flight of the N.1 took place at the Caproni facility in Taliedo, outside Milan, flown by Mario de Bernardi.

The N.1 achieved mixed results; while it was perceived and commended as a crucial milestone in aviation (until the revelation of the He 178's earlier flight), the performance of the aircraft was unimpressive. It was slower than many existing conventional aircraft of the era, while the motorjet engine was incapable of producing sufficient thrust to deliver adequate performance for a fighter aircraft. As such, the N.1 programme never led to any operational combat aircraft, and the motorjet design was soon superseded by more powerful turbojets. Only one of the two examples of the N.1 to have been constructed has survived to the present day.

== Background ==
During 1931, Italian aeronautics engineer Secondo Campini submitted a report to the Regia Aeronautica (the Italian Air Force) on the potential of jet propulsion; this report included his proposals for one such implementation, which he referred to as a thermo-jet. That same year, Campini established a company, with his two brothers, called the "Velivoli e Natanti a Reazione" (Italian for "Jet Aircraft and Boats") to pursue the development of this engine. In April 1932, the company demonstrated a pump-jet propelled boat in Venice. The boat achieved a top speed of 28 knots (32 mph; 52 km/h), a speed comparable to a boat with a conventional engine of similar output. The Italian Navy, who had funded the development of the boat, placed no orders and vetoed the sale of the design outside Italy.

During 1934, the Regia Aeronautica granted approval for the development of a pair of prototypes, along with a static testbed, for the purpose of demonstrating the principle of a jet aircraft, as well as to explore potential military applications. As his company lacked the necessary industrial infrastructure for such endeavours, Campini formed an arrangement with the larger Caproni aviation manufacturer, under which the latter provided the required material assistance for the manufacturing of the prototypes. Under this relationship, Campini developed his design, which later received the official Italian Air Force designation of N.1.

Historian Nathanial Edwards has contrasted the relative openness of Italian early jet development work against the high levels of secrecy present within other nation's programmes, such as Britain and Germany. He speculated that this was due to desire of the Italian government to be perceived as possessing a modern and advanced aviation industry, being keen to acquire national prestige and renown for such achievements. Edwards went on to claim that the practicality of the N.1 design was undermined by political pressure to speed the programme along so that Italy would be more likely to be the first country in the world to perform a jet-powered flight.

== Design ==
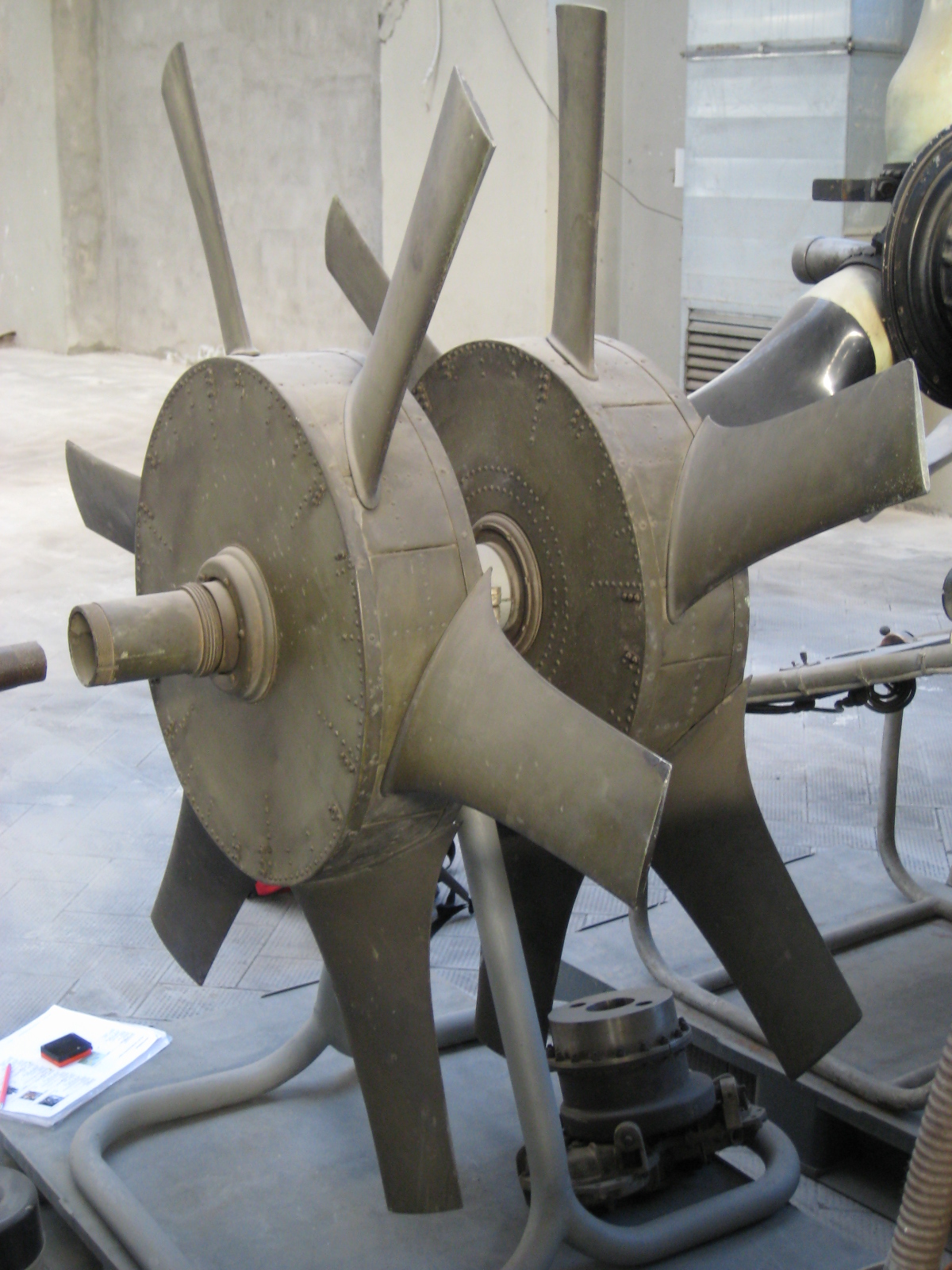
The first two stages of the compressor of the C.C.2

The Caproni Campini N.1 is an experimental aircraft, designed to demonstrate the practicality of jet propulsion and its viability as an engine for aircraft. It was a monoplane built entirely out of duralumin, with an elliptical wing. The original design was to have the aircraft cockpit pressurised but this facility was never installed. The aircraft was fitted with dual controls allowing it to be flown from either of the two seats. Both seats had individual rearward sliding canopies however, flight testing quickly revealed that, due to the excessive heat output of the propulsion system, the canopy had to be left permanently open as a mitigating measure.

The engine of the N.1 differs substantially from the later-produced turbojet and turbofan engines. One crucial difference in Campini's design is that the compressor – a three-stage, variable-incidence one, located forward of the cockpit – was driven by a conventional piston engine, this being a 900 hp (670 kW), liquid-cooled Isotta Fraschini unit. The airflow provided by the compressor was used to cool the engine before being mixed with the engine's exhaust gases, thus recovering most of the heat energy that in traditional piston-propeller designs would be wasted. A ring-shaped burner then injected fuel into the gas flow and ignited it, immediately before the exhaust nozzle, to further increase thrust.

In practice the engine provided enough thrust for flight without activating the rear burner, making the design somewhat similar to a ducted fan coupled to an afterburner. Campini referred to this configuration as being a thermojet, although it has since become commonly known as motorjet. The relatively small size of the duct limited the mass flow and thus the propulsive efficiency of the engine. In modern designs this is offset through high overall pressure ratios, which could not be achieved on the N.1, therefore resulting in relatively low thrust and poor fuel efficiency. Ground tests performed with the static testbed produced a thrust of around 700 kgf (1,500 lbf).

== Operational history ==
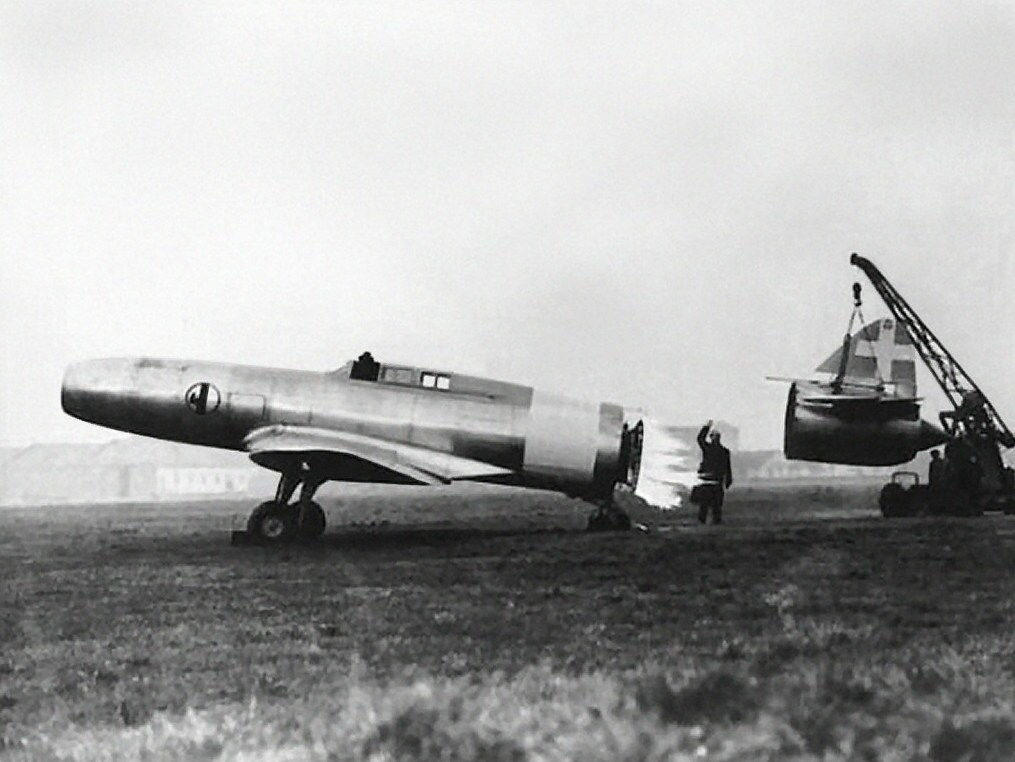
The C.C.2 during a ground test, with the tail section removed. The lit burner is within the airflow from the compressor.

The N.1's first flight was made on 27 August 1940 by test pilot Mario De Bernardi at Caproni's facility in Taliedo, outside Milan. He would conduct the majority of the N.1's test flights. The first flight lasted ten minutes, during which de Bernardi kept the speed below 225 mph (362 km/h), less than half throttle.

Although the first flight of the jet-powered Heinkel He 178 had been made a year before to the day, it had not been made public, so the Fédération Aéronautique Internationale recorded the N.1 as the first successful flight by a jet aircraft.

Flight tests with the first prototype revealed several issues with the engine. It did not produce sufficient thrust to achieve the anticipated performance if it was matched to a strengthened airframe to withstand the high loading pressures. The engine generated considerable heat, which forced the pilot to fly with the canopy open throughout the flight, which although effectively venting the heat, increased drag. According to aviation author Sterling Michael Pavelec the N.1 was "heavy and underpowered" and the conventionally-powered Caproni Vizzola F.4 was faster which he attributed to limited national resources which left development programs underfunded.

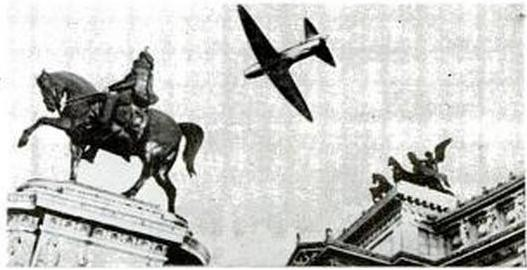
N.1 over Rome

On 30 November 1941 the second prototype (Caproni construction No 4850) was flown by de Bernardi, with Giovanni Pedace as a passenger, from Milan's Linate Airport to Rome's Guidonia Airport. During the flight adverse weather caused a diversion, resulting in an unplanned flight over Pisa. On 5 December 1941, de Bernardi made a flight over central Rome following a request from Benito Mussolini. On 6 December 1941, Mussolini inspected the aircraft and watched de Bernardi demonstrate its capabilities.

Testing of the first Caproni Campini N.1 prototype (Caproni construction No 4849) by the Italian military took place from December 1941 to August 1942 with the aircraft receiving its military serial number (MM.487) on 30 December 1941. During the test program the aircraft was regularly shown off to foreign delegations. The last known flight by a Caproni Campini N.1 took place on the 27 August 1942. In June 1944, MM.487 was found by Allied forces in its hangar at Guidonia airport. The aircraft was badly damaged either from allied bombing raids or by the retreating Germans. The damaged prototype was transported to the United Kingdom for study at the Royal Aircraft Establishment (RAE) in Farnborough. The aircraft was later scrapped at RAF Newton in 1949. The other example MM.448 (Caproni construction No 4850) survived the war in excellent condition.

== Further developments ==
A variant of the Yokosuka MXY-7 Ohka, built in Japan towards the end of WW2, was powered by a Ishikawajima Tsu-11 motorjet based on Campini's design. The Soviets were influenced by reports of the Campini Caproni N1 and developed the Kholshchevnikov VRDK motorjet engine which was used in the Mikoyan-Gurevich I-250 and the Sukhoi Su-5 aircraft. The Caproni company proposed a development of their Reggiane Re.2005 Sagittario single-seat fighter with the auxiliary 370 h.p. engine used to drive two centrifugal compressors. One compressor was to be used for supercharging the main Daimler-Benz DB 605 engine, and the auxiliary unit, while the second would be used to provide reaction propulsion.

== Surviving aircraft ==
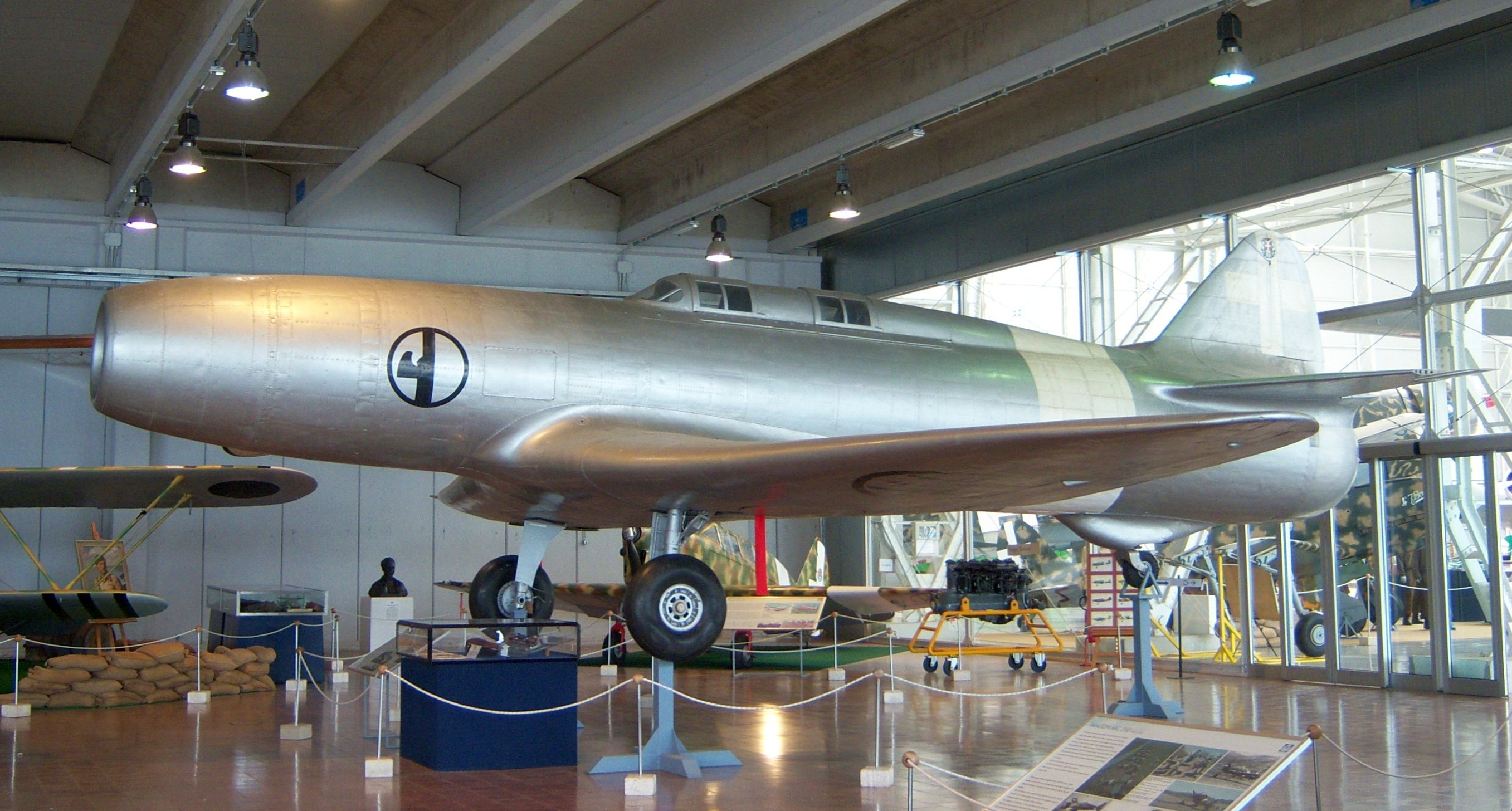
The surviving C.C.2 at the Italian Air Force Museum

The surviving example is now on display at the Italian Air Force Museum at Vigna di Valle, near Rome, and the ground testbed, consisting of only the fuselage, is on display at the National Museum of Science and Technology in Milan.

== Specifications ==
Data from Illustrated Encyclopedia of Aircraft

General characteristics

- Crew: 2
- Length: 13.1 m (43 ft 0 in)
- Wingspan: 15.85 m (52 ft 0 in)
- Height: 4.7 m (15 ft 5 in)
- Wing area: 36 m^{2} (390 sq ft)
- Empty weight: 3,640 kg (8,025 lb)
- Max takeoff weight: 4,195 kg (9,248 lb)
- Powerplant: 1 × motorjet , 6.9 kN (1,600 lbf) thrust consisting of a 670 kW (900 hp) Isotta Fraschini L.121 R.C.40 piston engine driving a three-stage, variable-pitch axial compressor with an afterburner

Performance

- Maximum speed: 375 km/h (233 mph, 202 kn)
- Service ceiling: 4,000 m (13,000 ft)

== See also ==
Aircraft of comparable role, configuration, and era

- Mikoyan-Gurevich I-250
- Sukhoi Su-5

Related lists

- List of jet aircraft of World War II
