= Secondo Campini =

Italian engineer and pioneer of the jet engine

Secondo Campini (August 28, 1904 – February 7, 1980) was an Italian engineer and one of the pioneers of the jet engine.

Campini was born at Bologna, Emilia-Romagna. In 1931 he wrote a proposal for the Italian Air Ministry on the value of jet propulsion, and in 1932 demonstrated a jet-powered boat in Venice. With support of the Air Ministry, he began work with Italian aircraft manufacturer Caproni to develop a jet aircraft, the Caproni Campini C.C.2, which first flew in 1940.

The "motorjet" that Campini developed to propel the C.C.2 is substantially different from the jet engines of today. Campini's engine used a conventional piston engine to compress air, which was then mixed with fuel and ignited. Modern jets are based on the turbojet principle, but Campini's engine was nevertheless a true jet, since it was the reactive force of the burning exhaust gases that pushed the aircraft along.

After World War II, Campini emigrated to the US at the request of Preston Tucker (noted for the Tucker 48 automobile), who wanted Campini to help him with his new corporation. Tucker asked Campini to both help him develop a turbine powered car, and also used his fame to attempt to secure a US Air Force development contract for the Tucker Corporation. After the Tucker Corporation folded in 1948, he worked on a number of military projects, including the YB-49 flying-wing bomber.

Campini died in Milan in 1980.
