= Motorjet =

Type of jet engine

Main components of Mikoyan-Gurevich I-250 motorjet-powered aircraft; the propeller is absent on some designs.

A motorjet is a rudimentary type of jet engine which is sometimes referred to as thermojet, a term now commonly used to describe a particular and completely unrelated pulsejet design. It uses a piston engine to drive a compressor which was then used to combust fuel, similar to a jet engine.

== Design ==
At the heart the motorjet is an ordinary piston engine (hence, the term motor), but instead of (or sometimes, as well as) driving a propeller, it drives a compressor. The compressed air is channeled into a combustion chamber, where fuel is injected and ignited. The high temperatures generated by the combustion cause the gases in the chamber to expand and escape at high velocity from the exhaust, creating a thermal reactive force that provides useful thrust.

Motorjet engines provide greater thrust than a propeller alone mounted on a piston engine; this has been successfully demonstrated in a number of different aircraft. A jet engine also can provide thrust at higher speeds where a propeller becomes less efficient or even ineffective; in fact, a jet engine gains efficiency as speed rises, while a propeller loses it (outside of a certain design range). This gives better efficiency in either operating range than an aircraft powered by just a propeller or a jet. The same is true of the dual-powerplant aircraft experimented with after the turbojet became practicable, which were equipped with both a piston-driven propeller and a turbojet engine.

== History ==
- In 1908 French inventor René Lorin proposed using a piston engine to compress air that would then be mixed with fuel and burned to produce pulses of hot gas that would be expelled through a nozzle to generate a propelling force.
- In 1917, O. Morize of Châteaudun, France, proposed the Morize ejector scheme in which a reciprocating engine drove a compressor supplying air to a liquid-fueled combustion chamber which discharged into a convergent-divergent tube and ultimately out into the atmosphere.
- The term "motor jet" was established in a patent filed in Britain by J.H. Harris of Esher, U.K., in 1917.
- It was next explored by Secondo Campini in the early 1930s, although it was not until 1940 that an aircraft, the Caproni Campini N.1 (sometimes referred to as C.C.2), would fly powered by his engine. Campini used the term thermojet at this time to describe his motorjet.
- NACA engineer Eastman Jacobs was actively pursuing thermojet research in the early 1940s for a project that came to be known as "Jake's jeep", which was never completed, as turbojet technology overtook it.
- Japanese engineers developed the Ishikawajima Tsu-11 motorjet engine to power Yokosuka MXY-7 Ohka aircraft as an alternative to the solid-propellant rocket engines that these aircraft were then using.
- The Soviet Mikoyan-Gurevich I-250, designed in 1944, used a piston engine to drive both a propeller at the nose of the plane, and a Kholshchevnikov VRDK motorjet leading to a jet exhaust at the tail. Between 10 and 50 I-250 (a.k.a. MiG-13) aircraft were produced, serviced, and flown by the Soviet Navy through 1950. The similarly designed Sukhoi Su-5 was also produced as a prototype during the same period.
- An incomplete prototype of the motorjet powered Caproni Campini Ca.183bis was built in the Italian Social Republic but was probably destroyed in 1944.

Motorjet research was nearly abandoned at the end of World War II, as the turbojet was a more practical solution to jet power, using the jet exhaust to drive a gas turbine and providing the power to drive the compressor without the additional weight and complexity of a piston engine that generated no thrust. One of the primary advantages of the motorjet layout was that the reciprocating engine provided power for the compressor and no turbine power section was needed. However, metallurgy and understanding of the design of turbines had advanced to a point after World War II where it was feasible to create a turbine to operate reliably in the high-velocity hot-gas environment downstream of the combustor, and the motorjet idea lost favor.

== See also ==
- Luigi Stipa
- Caproni Campini N.1
- Stipa-Caproni
