= Sukhoi Su-5 =

Soviet fighter prototype

Su-5 (I-107)
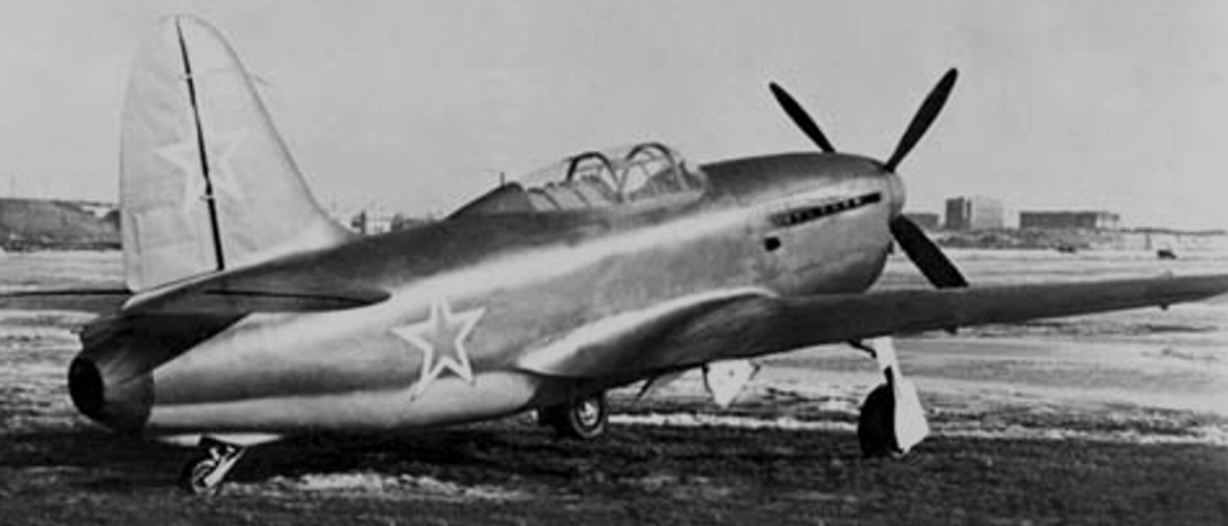

General information
- Type: Fighter
- Manufacturer: Sukhoi
- Designer: Pavel Sukhoi
- Status: Cancelled
- Number built: 1

History
- First flight: 6 April 1945

The Sukhoi Su-5 or I-107 was a Soviet mixed-power (propeller and motorjet) prototype fighter aircraft built toward the end of World War II.

== Development ==
The appearance of the German turbojet-powered Messerschmitt Me 262 near the end of World War II prompted the Soviet Union to develop faster fighter aircraft. Since the USSR lacked a production-ready turbojet engine, development efforts were directed toward mixed-power aircraft utilizing a conventional piston engine-driven propeller for the majority of propulsion with a small rocket or jet engine for bursts of speed.

The Su-5 (initially I-107) and the conceptually similar Mikoyan-Gurevich I-250 were designed in 1944. The aircraft first flew on 6 April 1945 and underwent limited flight testing. It was subsequently fitted with a laminar flow wing and attained 793 km/h (428 kn, 493 mph) at 4,350 m (14,270 ft) with the motorjet functioning. On 15 June 1945, the Klimov VK-107A piston engine was damaged beyond repair in flight. Following acquisition of another VK-107A, flight testing continued until 18 October when the engine reached the end of its service life. No further VK-107As could be procured and the project was canceled.

The Su-5 was a conventional monoplane of all-metal construction. The Kholshchevnikov VRDK motorjet in the rear of the fuselage was powered by a driveshaft from the VK-107 piston engine and could provide an additional 100 km/h (54 kn, 62 mph) of speed for three minutes.

== Specifications (Su-5) ==
Data from Istoriia konstruktskii samoletov v SSSR, 1938–1950, The Great Book of Fighters, OKB Sukhoi

General characteristics

- Crew: 1
- Length: 8.51 m (27 ft 11 in)
- Wingspan: 10.56 m (34 ft 8 in)
- Wing area: 17 m^{2} (180 sq ft)
- Airfoil: root: TsAGI 1B10 (16.5%); tip: NACA 23011
- Empty weight: 2,954 kg (6,512 lb)
- Gross weight: 3,804 kg (8,386 lb)
- Powerplant: 1 × Klimov VK-107A V-12 liquid-cooled piston engine, 1,230 kW (1,650 hp) at 8,300 m (27,200 ft)
- Powerplant: 1 × VRDK main-engine driven motorjet booster, 2.9 kN (650 lbf) thrust for 10 minutes (Воздушно-Реактивный Двигатель Компрессорный - Vozdushno-Reaktivny Dvigatel Kompressornyi – air reaction compressor jet)
- Propellers: 4-bladed constant-speed propeller

Performance

- Maximum speed: 793 km/h (493 mph, 428 kn) at 4,350 m (14,270 ft)

810 km/h (500 mph; 440 kn) at 7,800 m (25,600 ft)

- Range: 600 km (370 mi, 320 nmi)
- Service ceiling: 12,050 m (39,530 ft)
- Time to altitude: 5,000 m (16,000 ft) in 5 minutes 42 seconds

Armament

- Guns:

- 1 × 23 mm (0.91 in) Nudelman-Suranov NS-23 cannon with 100 rounds
- 2 × 12.7 mm (0.50 in) Berezin UB machine guns with 200 rpg

== See also ==
Aircraft of comparable role, configuration, and era

- Mikoyan-Gurevich I-250
