= Mikoyan-Gurevich I-250 =

Soviet fighter aircraft prototype

I-250
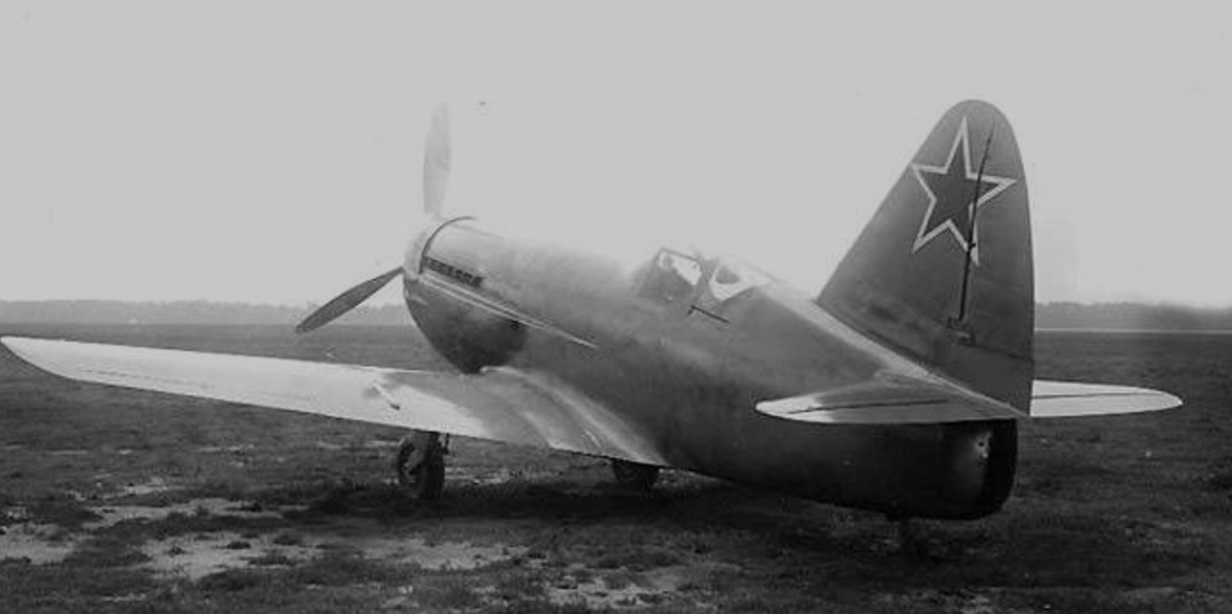

General information
- Type: Fighter aircraft
- National origin: Soviet Union
- Manufacturer: Mikoyan-Gurevich
- Status: Cancelled
- Number built: 12

History
- Manufactured: 1945–1946
- First flight: 3 March 1945

The Mikoyan-Gurevich I-250 (Samolet N), aka MiG-13, was a Soviet fighter aircraft developed as part of a crash program in 1944 to develop a high-performance fighter to counter German turbojet-powered aircraft such as the Messerschmitt Me 262. The Mikoyan-Gurevich design bureau decided to focus on a design that used something more mature than the jet engine, which was still at an experimental stage in the Soviet Union, and chose a mixed-power solution with the VRDK (Vozdushno-Reaktivny Dvigatel Kompressornyi – air reaction compressor jet) motorjet powered by the Klimov VK-107 V12 engine. While quite successful when it worked, with a maximum speed of 820 km/h (510 mph) being reached during trials, production problems with the VRDK fatally delayed the program and it was canceled in 1948 as obsolete.

== Design and development ==
By January 1944 the Soviets were aware of successful British and American jet aircraft projects and that the Germans were about to deploy jet and rocket-propelled aircraft of their own. The GKO ordered on 18 February that the NKAP (People's Commissariat for Aviation Industry) centralize jet research under its control and that the NKAP was to present proposals to alleviate the situation within a month. As a result of this meeting the NKAP ordered the Lavochkin, Sukhoi, Yakovlev and Mikoyan-Gurevich design bureaus (OKBs) to develop and build jet aircraft with the utmost dispatch. Aware of earlier problems encountered with other novel propulsion systems such as ramjets both Sukhoi and Mikoyan-Gurevich chose to use the VRDK booster engine that had been under development since 1942.

The VRDK was a motorjet, a rudimentary type of jet engine where an external power source drove the engine's compressor. It forced air into the stainless steel combustion chamber where fuel was sprayed from seven nozzles and ignited to exhaust out the variable rear nozzle. In the I-250 a 1,650-horsepower (1,230 kW) Klimov VK-107R V12 piston engine was used as the primary powerplant. After takeoff a clutch at the end of the crankshaft could be engaged which drove a step up gearbox with a ratio of 13:21 to an extension shaft that powered the compressor of the VRDK. The air for the compressor was fed through a long duct that ran from the inlet underneath the propeller spinner, thence under the engine and through the belly of the aircraft. This duct also fed air to the oil cooler near the engine, but the water radiator was positioned behind the compressor to maximize airflow over it. A secondary duct led from the main duct to the VK-107's supercharger; when the VRDK was running the secondary duct diverted some of that additional air to the supercharger which boosted the engine's output to 2,500-horsepower (1,900 kW) at 7,000 m (22,966 ft). The increased airflow over the engine radiator helped to dump the engine's excess heat into the exhaust stream. However the VRDK was limited to only ten minutes' operating time per sortie, which meant that it was useless weight during the rest of the flight.

Diagram of the I-250's engine installation

The I-250 was a low-wing, all-metal aircraft with a monocoque fuselage. Other than the VRDK the aircraft was largely conventional in layout, although the cockpit was set very far back in the fuselage, almost to the base of the vertical tail. The two-spar wings had a thickness of 10% to preserve aileron control and avoid tip stall. They were fitted with Frise ailerons and slotted flaps. Fuel was contained in a 412-litre (91 imp gal; 109 US gal) fuselage tank and a 100-litre (22 imp gal; 26 US gal) tank in each wing. The conventional landing gear mainwheels had a levered suspension and retracted inwards. The tail wheel retracted aft into the very small ventral fin. The VK-107A engine initially drove a 3.1-metre (10 ft) VISh-105SV propeller.

The NKAP had asked Mikoyan to begin preliminary design work on a high-altitude interceptor in January 1944, but ordered two prototypes of an all-metal interceptor using the VRDK for testing in February and March 1945. The aircraft was to reach an altitude of 5,000 m (16,000 ft) in 4.5 minutes with full power and 5.5 minutes using the piston engine alone. Its maximum speed was to be 810 km/h (500 mph) at 7,000 m (22,966 ft) with full power and 700 km/h (430 mph) at 7,000 m (22,966 ft) using the VK-107 by itself. Its intended armament was one 23 mm (0.91 in) autocannon and two 12.7 mm (0.50 in) machine guns. To assist Mikoyan TsAGI was ordered to provide help with aerodynamic and stress calculations and to test a full-size mockup in their wind tunnel in one month's time. TsIAM was ordered to deliver three VRDK engines with 9-kilonewton (2,000 lb_{f}) at 7,000 m (22,966 ft) with a specific fuel consumption of 1,200 kg (2,600 lb) per hour. The plane was designated I-250 by the NKAP; but the internal OKB designation was N.

The NKAP approved the preliminary specifications of the I-250 on 19 September 1944 which included a maximum speed of 825 km/h (513 mph) a take-off weight of 3,500 kg (7,700 lb) and a time to 5,000 metres (16,404 ft) of 3.9 minutes. A mock-up was inspected on 26 October and rejected because of the poor cockpit layout, although this decision was reversed because the fuselage of the first prototype was too far along for major changes that would have significantly delayed the program. That same month the combustion chamber was sent to TsIAM for testing which revealed it to be too weak. The complete powerplant was tested in December, but the drive shaft connecting them failed several times.

The first prototype was completed on 26 February 1945, although the VRDK was not yet ready. It was fitted with a new 3.1-metre (10 ft) AV-10P-60 propeller before making its first flight on 4 April according to Gordon and Komissarov, although Belyakov and Marmain say 3 March. It was armed with three 20 mm Berezin B-20 cannon with 160 rounds each. One gun was fitted on each side of the nose and the third fired through the hollow propeller shaft. The VRDK was tested for the first time on 8 April in a dive, attaining a speed of 710 km/h (440 mph), but a leak was found in the oil cooler after landing and the VRDK had to be returned to the factory for repairs. The VRDK was reinstalled by 14 April, but was still troublesome. It twice reached 809 km/h (503 mph) at about 7,000 m (22,966 ft) during these early tests, but its service life had been exceeded by 30 May and it had to be returned to TsIAM, which postponed any further tests until the second aircraft was finished.

The unarmed second prototype was completed on 19 May, but did not make its first flight until 26 May. It was later discovered to have several major defects, including an oil leak from the VRDK compressor's sleeve. The VRDK's designer was summoned in an attempt to solve its problems although not all of these were design issues. The first prototype was grounded for most of June to remedy magneto problems and to add extra air intakes to cool the spark plugs. It attained a speed of 820 km/h (510 mph) at 6,700 m (21,982 ft) on 3 July. Unfortunately its port tailplane failed at low altitude two days later, killing the test pilot, Alexandr Deyev, when his parachute failed to open in time. Post-crash analysis revealed that he had exceeded the airframe's G limit while maneuvering.

Despite the accident, a pre-production batch of ten aircraft was ordered on 27 July 1945 as it was felt that mixed-power aircraft would be of some use easing the transition of pilots from piston-engine fighters to jet-engined ones. At the same time Sukhoi's Su-5 was cancelled as it was judged inferior to the I-250.

In the meantime the horizontal stabilizer of the second prototype was strengthened and it resumed flying on 20 July. The pilot complained of excess torque pull to the right so the vertical stabilizer was enlarged by 0.63 m^{2} (6.8 sq ft), but this was just one of numerous problems, and it was not ready to pass State acceptance trials without more development work on the powerplant. However, the second prototype continued flight testing until 12 July 1946 when an engine fire forced an emergency landing and it was damaged beyond repair.

The order for the pre-production I-250s had been placed with Factory No. 381 in Moscow for two aircraft to be delivered in September, three more in October and the remainder by the end of the year. This proved to be very optimistic and it was revised to a single aircraft by the end of the year. The airframe was completed on this revised schedule, but its engine was not ready in time. The factory management was much criticized for these problems which were not entirely under their control as changes to the design and drawings were constant. The criticism was not limited to just the I-250 program as the other jet programs could not be developed as fast as the leadership wanted as well and Alexei Shakhurin, the head of MAP (Ministry of Aviation Industry) and its NKAP predecessor since 1940, was arrested in March 1946 as a sign of their displeasure. The new Minister severely reprimanded the designer of the VRDK and three factory directors on 13 April 1946 and set up a commission to determine why Factory No. 381 and TsIAM had failed to meet their deadlines. He refused to accept its findings as it apportioned blame fairly evenly among those responsible for the production program and he had the director of Factory No. 381 and his quality control manager arrested for industrial sabotage.

Despite these production problems and the fact that the I-250 had yet even to be submitted for State acceptance trails, an order had been placed for fifty more aircraft on 26 February (these aircraft have been referred to as the MiG-13, which presumably would have been their designation if they had actually entered service). A new deadline of 5 July 1946 was set for the delivery of the first pre-production aircraft, but it was stymied, again, for a lack of an engine. By this time seven airframes had been completed, but all lacked engines. The first I-250 was finally accepted on 8 August and flown for the first time three days later, although its engine seals failed and a number of ignition cables were scorched. The engine replacement and repairs forced the aircraft to miss its scheduled appearance at the Tushino Air Display. It was handed over to the NII VVS (Air Force Scientific Test Institute) on 15 September to finally begin its State acceptance tests. All ten aircraft had been delivered by 30 October, although construction number 3810107 (Factory No. 381, first batch, seventh aircraft) was used as a static test airframe and 3810110 became a static engine testbed.

Joseph Stalin convened a meeting on 29 November 1946 to settle the future policy on jet fighters for the VVS and PVO. The Mikoyan-Gurevich MiG-9 was selected as the primary fighter with the Yakovlev Yak-15 relegated to conversion training and familiarization. The imminent availability of British jet engines and access to German jet technology and engineers meant that there was no longer any need for mixed-power aircraft, but Stalin insisted that the I-250 finish its trials and that the tooling and drawings should be retained along with unassembled parts even though the program was cancelled.

Completion of the trials would be delayed until May 1947 when the trials of the VRDK itself would be completed and Mikoyan tried to sell the aircraft to Naval Aviation for use as escorts for torpedo bombers. Additional fuel tanks were fitted in the wings and fuselage of 3810102 to carry an additional 218 litres (48 imp gal; 58 US gal) of fuel and the capacity of the oil tank was increased to 78 litres (17 imp gal; 21 US gal). These changes increased its empty weight to 3,028 kg (6,676 lb) and its take-off weight to 3,931 kg (8,666 lb). A new round of State trials began on 9 October 1947, but these were delayed by bad weather and reliability issues. Only six flights totaling two hours and twenty-five minutes had been completed by 21 January 1948 and the VRDK had only been run for a minute and half during a ground test. The I-250 was unsurprisingly declared to have failed the trials on 3 April 1948.

== Specifications (first prototype) ==
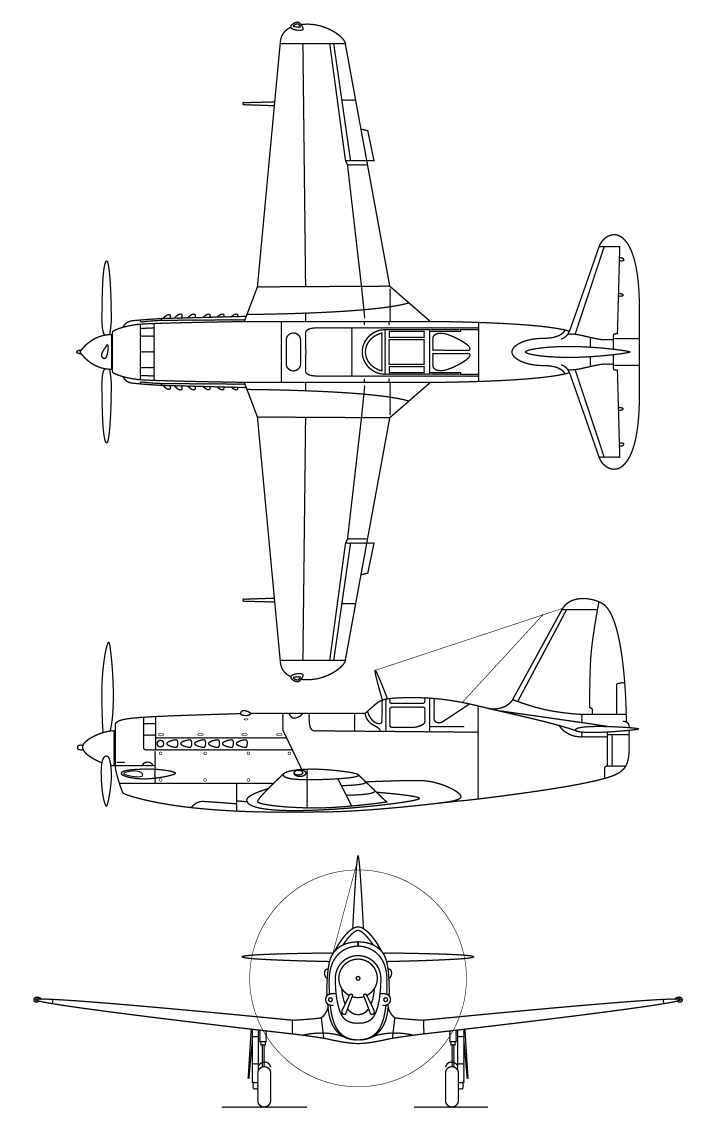
I-250

Data from OKB Mikoyan: A History of the Design Bureau and its Aircraft, OKB MiG

General characteristics

- Crew: 1
- Height: 3.7 m (12 ft 2 in)
- Wing area: 14.99 m^{2} (161.4 sq ft)
- Empty weight: 2,797 kg (6,166 lb)
- Gross weight: 3,650 kg (8,047 lb)
- Fuel capacity: 612 litres (135 imp gal; 162 US gal) / 570 kg (1,260 lb) fuel and oil
- Powerplant: 1 × Klimov VK-107R V-12 liquid-cooled piston engine, 1,230 kW (1,650 hp) with VRDK - equivalent power 2,088 kW (2,800 hp)
- Powerplant: 1 × Kholshchevnikov VRDK motorjet, 2.9 kN (660 lbf) thrust (VRDK - Vozdushno-Reaktivnyi Dvigatyel Kompressornyi)
- Propellers: 3-bladed AV-10P-60, 3.1 m (10 ft 2 in) diameter constant-speed propeller

Performance

- Maximum speed: 820 km/h (510 mph, 440 kn)
- Range: 790 km (490 mi, 430 nmi)
- Service ceiling: 11,900 m (39,000 ft)
- Wing loading: 245 kg/m^{2} (50 lb/sq ft)

Armament

- 3 × 20 mm (0.787 in) Berezin B-20 autocannon (160 rounds each)

== See also ==
Aircraft of comparable role, configuration, and era

- Curtiss XF15C
- Ryan FR Fireball
- Sukhoi Su-5

Related lists

- List of military aircraft of the Soviet Union and the CIS
- List of fighter aircraft
