= List of aircraft (C–Cc) =

This is a list of aircraft in alphabetical order beginning with 'C' through to 'Cc'.

== C–Cc ==
=== C-E ===
(C-E Aeroplane Works, (office) New York, NY; (plant) Anderson, IN)

- C-E A-12 Transcontinental Triplane
- E-C-13 1916 Triplane Tractor

=== CAARP ===
(Cooperative des Ateliers Aeronautiques de la Region Parisienne – Parisian aeronautic factory co-operative)

- CAARP CP-100
- CAARP CAP-20 (Mudry CAP 20)

=== CAB ===
(Cantieri Aeronautici Bergamaschi )

- see:Caproni-Bergamaschi

=== CAB ===
(Constructions Aéronautiques du Béarn – Béarn aeronautic manufacturers)

- CAB GY-20 Minicab
- CAB GY-30 Supercab

=== Cabane-Saissac ===
(Henri Saissac)

- Cabane-Saissac CS-01-3

=== Cabin-Aire ===
- OHS-3

(also displayed and registered as "Snyder OHS-III", "deLloyd Monoplane" and "Aire-Craft Cabin-Aire/deLloyd"

=== Cabrinha ===
(Richard Cabrinha)

- Cabrinha RC-412 Free Spirit (Mk II)

=== CAC ===
(Commonwealth Aircraft Corporation)

- CAC Wirraway
- CAC Wackett
- CAC Boomerang
- CAC Mustang
- CAC Kangaroo
- CAC Ceres
- CAC Winjeel
- CAC Avon-Sabre
- CAC Macchi
- CAC Kiowa

=== CAC ===
(Commuter Aircraft Corporation)

- CAC-100

=== CACT ===
(Compañía Aérea de Construcción y Transportes / Waterhouse / BAJA California / Tijuana)

- CACT BAJA California BC.1
- CACT BAJA California BC.2
- CACT BAJA California BC.3

=== Cadet ===
(Cadet Aircraft Co, Pomona, CA)

- Cadet 2-P-A (Chambers Trainer q.v.)

=== Cadillac ===
(Cadillac Aircraft Corp/H.G. McCarroll - Detroit, MI)

- McCarroll Voyageur
- McCarroll Duoplane

=== CAG ===
(Construcciones Aeronauticas de Galicia, Spain)

- CAG Toxo

=== Cage ===
(John M. Cage - Denver, CO)

- Cage 1909 Tilt-rotor (c. 1909)

=== Cagny ===
(Raymond Cagny - France)

- Cagney Performance 2000 (c. 1909)

=== CAHI ===
(anglicised version of TsAGI Центра́льный аэрогидродинами́ческий институ́т (ЦАГИ) or Tsentralniy Aerogidrodinamicheskiy Institut, the Central Aerohydrodynamic Institute) see:TsAGI

=== Cailly ===
(France)

- Cailly 1911 Type Millitaire

=== Cain ===
(Cain Aircraft Corp - Detroit, MI)

- Cain Sport

=== CAIC ===
(Changhe Aircraft Industries Corporation)

- Changhe Z-8
- Changhe WZ-10 (WZ – Wuzhuang Zhishengji – armed helicopter)
- Changhe Z-11

=== CAIG ===
(China Aviation Industry General)

- China Aviation Industry General Aircraft Primus 150

=== Cain ===
(Cain Aircraft Corp, 10527 Gratiot Ave, Detroit, MI)

- Cain Sport CC-14

=== Cairns ===
((Edmund B) Cairns Aircraft Corp, 62 Rubber Ave, Naugatuck, CT)

- Cairns A (based on the Clark Robinson Special)
- Cairns AG-4 (based on the Clark Robinson Special)
- Cairns AC-6
- Cairns OG
- Cairns B
- Cairns C

=== C.A.L. ===
(Columbia Air Liners, Inc., New York, NY)

- C.A.L. Mailplane "Uncle Sam" (1929)
- C.A.L. CAL-1 Triad
- C.A.L. CAL-2 (5 Place Amphibian)

=== Calderara ===
(Italy)

- Calderara 1912 Hydroaeroplane

=== Caldas Aeronautica ===
(Pali, Colombia)

- Caldas 2G7 Vento

=== Calidus ===
(Calidus Technology Development and Manufacturing Company, UAE)

- Calidus B-250

=== California ===
(USA)

- California Aero Glider "Skyway Express"

=== California ===
(California Aircraft Corp, Los Angeles, CA)

- California Cub D-1
- California Cub D-2

=== California ===
(John J Montijo & Lloyd Royer, Glendale, CA)

- California Coupe-Cabin

=== California Aero ===
(California Aero Mfg & Supply Co (Fdr: Cleve F Shaffer), San Francisco, CA)

- California Aero 1910 Biplane

=== California Cub ===
(California Aircraft Corp, 5866 South San Pedro St, Los Angeles, CA)

- California Cub D-1-K
- California Cub D-2

=== California Institute of Technology ===
(Pasadena, CA)

- California Institute of Technology Merrill Type Stagger-Decalage

=== Calipt'Air ===
(Spiez, Switzerland)

- Calipt'Air Serenis
- Calipt'Air V-56
- Calipt'Air Vectis
- Calipt'Air Walabis Bi

=== Call ===
((a.k.a.Girard) Aerial Navigation Co of America Inc (Fdr: Henry Laurens Call), Girard, KS)

- Call Mayfly 1909
- Call Whynot
- Call II monoplane

=== CallAir ===
((Ivan, Ruell T, Spencer) Call Aircraft Co, Afton, WY)

- CallAir S-1
- CallAir A
- CallAir A-1
- CallAir A-2
- CallAir A-3
- CallAir A-4
- CallAir A-5
- CallAir A-6
- CallAir A-7
- CallAir A-9
- CallAir B-1
- Call-Air Super Cadet

=== Calumet ===
(Calumet Motorsports)

- Calumet Snobird Explorer

=== Calvel ===
(Jacques Calvel)

- Calvel Frelon

=== Calvignac ===
(France)

- Calvinac 19123 Monoplane

=== Camair ===
( Camair Aircraft Corp, Remsenburg, NY)

- Camair Twin Navion

=== Camal ===
(Victor Camal, France)

- Camal 1911 Flying Machine (Patent)

=== Cambier ===
(Albert Cambier)

- Cambier AC1

=== Camco ===
(Chicago Aircraft Mfg Corp, 6116 St Lawrence Ave, Chicago, IL)

- Camco 2

=== CAMCO ===
(Central Aircraft Manufacturing Company Inc.)

- CAMCO V-Liner

=== Cameron & Sons Aircraft ===
- Cameron P-51G

=== Cammacorp ===
(El Segundo, CA)

- Cammacorp DC-8 Super 71

=== Campbell ===
(Corwin B Campbell, Evanston, IL)

- Campbell CB

=== Campbell ===
(John M Campbell, Tacoma, WA)

- Campbell Porpoise

=== Campbell ===
((Hayden S) Campbell Aircraft Co)

- Campbell Model F

=== Campbell ===
(Campbell Aircraft)

- Campbell Cougar
- Campbell Cricket
- Campbell Curlew

=== Campbell & Bone ===
(Mark M Campbell and R O Bone, Los Angeles, CA)

- Campbell Super Sport (Bone Golden Eagle C-5 prototypes)

=== Campini ===
Data from:

- Caproni-Campini N.1
- Campini CS.3
- Campini CS.4

=== CAMS ===
(Chantiers Aéro-Maritimes de la Seine – Seine aero-maritime shipbuilders)

- CAMS C.9 (License-Built SIAI S.9)
- CAMS C.13 (License-Built SIAI S.13)
- CAMS 30
- CAMS 31
- CAMS 32
- CAMS 33
- CAMS 34
- CAMS 35
- CAMS 36
- CAMS 37
- CAMS 38
- CAMS 42 ET.2
- CAMS 46
- CAMS 50
- CAMS 51
- CAMS 52
- CAMS 53
- CAMS 54GR
- CAMS 55
- CAMS 56
- CAMS 57
- CAMS 58
- CAMS 60
- CAMS 80
- CAMS 90
- CAMS 110
- CAMS 120

=== Canada Air RV ===
(Canada Air RV Inc, Edmonton, Alberta, Canada)

- ARV Griffin

=== Canadair ===
- Canadair C-4
- Canadair C-5
- Canadair CL-1 Canso
- Canadair CL-2 North Star
- Canadair CL-4 Argonaut
- Canadair CL-5
- Canadair CL-13 Sabre
- Canadair CL-21
- Canadair CL-28 Argus
- Canadair CL-30 Silver Star
- Canadair CL-41 Tutor
- Canadair CL-44 Yukon
- Canadair CL-66
- Canadair CL-84 Dynavert
- Canadair CL-89
- Canadair CL-90
- Canadair CL-201
- Canadair CL-215
- Canadair CL-219 Freedom Fighter
- Canadair CL-226 Freedom Fighter
- Canadair CL-227
- Canadair CL-289
- Canadair CL-415
- Canadair CL-540
- Canadair CL-600 Challenger
- Canadair CL-601 Challenger
- Canadair CL-604 Challenger
- Canadair CL-605 Challenger
- Canadair CL-610 Challenger E
- Canadair Regional Jet CRJ100
- Canadair Regional Jet CRJ200

=== Canadair aircraft Canadian military designations ===
(all manufacturers - see List of aircraft of Canada's air forces) Data from:

- Bombardier CC-144 Challenger
- Canadair CX-84 Dynavert
- Canadair CF-104 Starfighter
- Canadair CC-106 Yukon
- Canadair CP-107 Argus
- Canadair CP-108 Caribou
- Canadair CC-109 Cosmopolitan
- Canadair CF-111 Starfighter
- Canadair CT-114 Tutor
- Canadair CF-116
- Canadair CX-131
- Canadair CT-133 Silver Star 3
- Canadair CE-144A
- Canadair CC-144
- Canadair CP-144
- Canadair CX-144
- Canadair CF-5D

=== Canadian Aerodrome Company ===
- Hubbard 1910 monoplane
- Baddeck No. 1
- Baddeck No. 2

=== Canadian Aeroplanes ===
(Canadian Aeroplanes Ltd., Canada)

- Canadian Aeroplanes F-5L

=== Canadian Car and Foundry ===
- Burnelli CBY-3
- Gregor FDB-1
- CC&F F.A.T. 2 Maple Leaf
- CC&F SBW Helldiver

=== Canadian Home Rotors ===
- Canadian Home Rotors Safari
- Canadian Home Rotors Baby Belle

=== Canadian ===
(Canadian Powered Parachutes, Vegreville, Alberta, Canada)

- Canadian Phase I

=== Canadian military aircraft designations ===
(all manufacturers) - see List of aircraft of Canada's air forces

=== Canadian Vickers ===
- Canadian Vickers Vancouver
- Canadian Vickers Vanessa
- Canadian Vickers Varuna
- Canadian Vickers Vedette
- Canadian Vickers Velos
- Canadian Vickers Vigil
- Canadian Vickers Vista

=== Canadian Wooden Aircraft ===
(Canadian Wooden Aircraft Co., Canada)

- Canadian Wooden Aircraft Robin

=== Canaero Dynamics ===
- Canaero Dynamics Toucan series II

=== CanAmerican ===
(CanAmerican Inc)

- CanAmerican S.G.VI

=== Canard Aviation ===
see Aviafiber

=== Cañete ===
(Captain of Engineers Antonio Cañete Heredia)

- Cañete Pirata (aka HACR for Hidro Antonio Cañete de Reconocimiento)

=== Cannon ===
(Walter Cannon, Los Angeles, CA)

- Cannon 1911 biplane
- Cannon (1911 monoplane)

=== Canova ===
- Canova 1950 all-wing

=== CANSA ===
(Construzioni Aeronautiche Novaresi SA – Fiat)

- CANSA Lictor 90
- CANSA Lictor 130
- CANSA C.4
- CANSA C.5
- CANSA C.6 Falchetto
- CANSA FC.11 (trainer project)
- CANSA FC.12
- CANSA FC.20
- CANSA CT.24 (Assault glider - 2 ordered but not built)

=== CANT ===
- (sometimes labelled 'C.R.D.A. CANT')
- (CANT – Cantieri Aeronautici e Navali Triestini – Trieste shipbuilding and naval aeronautics)
- (Part of C.R.D.A. – Cantieri Riuniti dell'Adriatico – re-united Adriatic shipbuilding)
- CNT-II
- CANT 6
- CANT 7
- CANT 10
- CANT 13
- CANT 18
- CANT 21
- CANT 22
- CANT 23
- CANT 25
- CANT 26
- CANT 27
- CANT 36
- CANT 38
- CANT Z.501
- CANT Z.504
- CANT Z.505
- CANT Z.506
- CANT Z.508
- CANT Z.509
- CANT Z.511
- CANT Z.515
- CANT Z.516
- CANT Z.1007
- CANT Z.1010
- CANT Z.1011
- CANT Z.1012
- CANT Z.1015
- CANT Z.1018

=== Cantinieau ===
(Jean Cantinieau)

- Cantinieau C-100

=== Canton ===
- Canton S2 (STAe specification 1918 S2 - armoured ground attack aircraft)

=== Canton et Unné ===
(Georges Canton et Georges Unné)

- Canton et Unné 1910 monoplane

=== Canton-Melcher ===
(Allen Canton & J Melcher, Bronx, NY)

- Canton-Melcher Transatlantic

=== Canu ===
(Lucien Canu)

- Canu 01

=== CAO ===
(see SNCAO))

=== CAP ===
(Companhia Aeronáutica Paulista)

- CAP Alcatraz
- CAP-1 Planalto (IPT-4 Planalto)
- CAP-3 Planalto (IPT-4 Planalto)
- CAP-4 Paulistinha
- CAP-5 Carioquinha
- CAP-6 Tufão
- CAP-7
- CAP-8
- CAP-9 Carioca

=== CAP Aviation ===
- CAP Aviation CAP-10
- CAP Aviation CAP-20
- CAP Aviation CAP-21
- CAP Aviation CAP-222
- CAP Aviation CAP-230
- CAP Aviation CAP-231
- CAP Aviation CAP-232

=== Capelis ===
(Safety Airplane Corp, Oakland Airport and El Cerrito, CA)

- Capelis XC-12

=== Capella ===
(Capella Aircraft Corporation, Austin, TX)

- Capella SS
- Capella XS
- Capella XLS
- Capella XLS Super 100
- Capella Flashback
- Capella Javelin

=== Capen ===
((Ernest J) Capen Aircraft Corp, Lincoln, NE)

- Capen Parasol
- Capen Skyway aka Special

=== Capital ===
(Capital Machinery Factory)

- Capital-1

=== Capital Air ===
(Capital Aircraft Co Inc, Lansing, MI, 1929: Relocated and renamed Royal Aircraft Corp, Royal Oak, MI (qv))

- Capital Air Trainer

=== Capital ===
(Capital Helicopter Corporation)

- Capital C-1 Hoppi-copter

=== CAPRA ===
( Compagnie Anonyme de Productions et Réalisations Aéronautiques (CAPRA)) – (Roger Aimé Robert, designer – Marcel Chassagny, manager)

- CAPRA R.10
- CAPRA RR.20
- CAPRA S.20
- CAPRA R.30
- CAPRA R.300
- CAPRA R.40
- CAPRA R.41
- CAPRA R.400
- CAPRA R.46
- CAPRA R.80
- CAPRA R.90

=== Caproni ===
Data from:Aeroplani Caproni
(Societa Italiana Caproni)
(see also: Caproni Bergamaschi, Caproni-Reggiane, Caproni Vizzola)

=== Pre-World War I ===
- Caproni Ca.1 of 1910 – Experimental biplane

=== World War I ===
- Caproni Ca.1 of 1914 – Heavy bomber
- Caproni Ca.2 – Heavy bomber
- Caproni Ca.3 – Heavy bomber
- Caproni Ca.4 – Heavy bomber
- Caproni Ca.5 – Heavy bomber
- Caproni Ca.14 - biplane
- Caproni Ca.15 - monoplane
- Caproni Ca.17 - monoplane
- Caproni Ca.18 – Observation plane
- Caproni Ca.19 - monoplane
- Caproni Ca.20 – Monoplane fighter
- Caproni Ca.21 - reconnaissance aircraft
- Caproni Ca.22 – Variable incidence research parasol monoplane
- Caproni Ca.26 - project
- Caproni Ca.27 - project
- Caproni Ca.28 - project
- Caproni Ca.29 - project
- Caproni Ca.31 – Modified Ca.1
- Caproni Ca.32 – Modified Italian Army version of Ca.1

=== Inter-war period ===
- Caproni Ca.30 – Postwar redesignation of 1914 Ca.1
- Caproni Ca.33 – Postwar redesignation of Ca.3
- Caproni Ca.34 – Postwar redesignation of proposed modified Ca.3
- Caproni Ca.35 – Postwar redesignation of proposed modified Ca.3
- Caproni Ca.36 – Postwar redesignation of modified Ca.3
- Caproni Ca.37 – Postwar redesignation of prototype ground-attack version of Ca.3
- Caproni Ca.39 – Postwar redesignation of proposed seaplane version of Ca.3
- Caproni Ca.40 – Postwar redesignation of Ca.4 prototype
- Caproni Ca.41 – Postwar redesignation of Ca.4 variant
- Caproni Ca.42 – Postwar redesignation of Ca.4 variant
- Caproni Ca.43 – Postwar redesignation of floatplane variant of Ca.4
- Caproni Ca.44 – Postwar redesignation of Ca.5 heavy bomber
- Caproni Ca.45 – Postwar redesignation of Ca.5 aircraft built for France
- Caproni Ca.46 – Postwar redesignation of Ca.5 variant
- Caproni Ca.47 – Postwar redesignation of seaplane version of Ca.5
- Caproni Ca.48 – Airliner version of Ca.4
- Caproni Ca.49 – Proposed seaplane airliner of 1919
- Caproni Ca.50 – Air ambulance version of Ca.44
- Caproni Ca.51 – Postwar redesignation of prototype of enlarged Ca.4
- Caproni Ca.52 – Postwar redesignation for Ca.4 aircraft built for Royal Naval Air Service
- Caproni Ca.56 – Airliner version of Ca.1
- Caproni Ca.57 – Airliner version of Ca.44
- Caproni Ca.58 – Postwar redesignation for re-engined Ca.4s
- Caproni Ca.59 – Postwar redesignation for exported Ca.58s
- Caproni Ca.60 Noviplano – Flying boat airliner prototype
- Caproni Ca.64 - fighter project
- Caproni Ca.65 - fighter project
- Caproni Ca.66 - Four-engine, single-fuselage bomber of 1922
- Caproni Ca.68 - reconnaissance flying boat project
- Caproni Ca.69 - reconnaissance flying boat project
- Caproni Ca.70 – Prototype night fighter of 1925
- Caproni Ca.71 – Ca.70 variant of 1927
- Caproni Ca.73 – Airliner and light bomber
- Caproni Ca.74 – Re-engined Ca.73 light bomber
- Caproni Ca.75 - biplane bomber project
- Caproni Ca.76 - biplane bomber project
- Caproni Ca.77 - biplane bomber project
- Caproni Ca.78 - biplane bomber project
- Caproni Ca.80 – Later redesignation of Ca.74
- Caproni Ca.81 - reconnaissance monoplane project
- Caproni Ca.82 – Redesignation of Ca.73ter variant
- Caproni Ca.83 - monoplane fighter
- Caproni Ca.84 - biplane flying boat project
- Caproni Ca.85 - biplane flying boat project
- Caproni Ca.86 - biplane flying boat project
- Caproni Ca.88 – Redesignation of Ca.73quarter variant
- Caproni Ca.89 – Redesignation of Ca.73quarterG variant
- Caproni Ca.90 – Heavy bomber aircraft
- Caproni Ca.92 - reconnaissance biplane project
- Caproni Ca.93 - biplane bomber project
- Caproni Ca.94 - 4-engine monoplane heavy bomber
- Caproni Ca.95 - Heavy bomber aircraft, 1933
- Caproni Ca.96 - 4-engine biplane heavy bomber project
- Caproni Ca.97 – Civil utility aircraft
- Caproni Ca.98 - monoplane tourer
- Caproni Ca.99 - biplane tourer
- Caproni Ca.100 – Trainer
- Caproni Ca.101 – Airliner, transport, and bomber
- Caproni Ca.102 – Re-engined Ca.101
- Caproni Ca.106 - civil biplane project
- Caproni Ca.107 - biplane fighter project
- Caproni Ca.108 - mailplane project
- Caproni Ca.109 - 2-seat biplane sport/trainer
- Caproni Ca.110 - biplane fighter project
- Caproni Ca.111 – Reconnaissance aircraft and light bomber
- Caproni Ca.113 – Advanced trainer
- Caproni Ca.114 – Biplane fighter
- Caproni Ca.115 - twin-engined sesquiplane bomber project
- Caproni Ca.116 - sports biplane project
- Caproni Ca.117 - experimental high-altitude monoplane project
- Caproni Ca.118 - twin-engine monoplane bomber project
- Caproni Ca.119 - reconnaissance biplane project
- Caproni Ca.121 - fast monoplane bomber project
- Caproni Ca.122 – Prototype bomber and transport
- Caproni Ca.123 – Proposed airliner version of Ca.122
- Caproni Ca.124 – Reconnaissance and bomber floatplane
- Caproni Ca.125 – Two-seat touring biplane
- Caproni Ca.126 - monoplane sports aircraft project
- Caproni Ca.128 - low-wing metal monoplane 1+4 feederliner project
- Caproni Ca.129 - low-wing metal monoplane 1+4 feederliner project
- Caproni Ca.130 - trimotor transport, precursor of Caproni Ca.133
- Caproni Ca.132 – Prototype bomber and airliner
- Caproni Ca.134 – Reconnaissance biplane
- Caproni Ca.150 - twin-boom attack fighter
- Caproni Ca.153 - monoplane heavy fighter project
- Caproni Ca.154 - twin-engine monoplane heavy fighter project
- Caproni Ca.155 - twin-engine monoplane heavy fighter project
- Caproni Ca.156 - twin-engined heavy fighter project
- Caproni Ca.161 – High-altitude experimental aircraft
- Caproni Ca.162 - recce-fighter project
- Caproni Ca.163 – Prototype of Ca.164
- Caproni Ca.165 – Prototype fighter of 1938
- Caproni Ca.204 - long-range bomber project
- Caproni Ca.211 - three-engine long-range bomber project
- Caproni Ca.201 - high altitude bomber project
- Caproni Ca.205 - long-range bomber project
- Caproni Ca.214 - aerobatic trainer project
- Caproni Ca.301 – Prototype fighter
- Caproni A.P.1 – Attack aircraft derivative of Ca.301
- Caproni Ca.305 – First production version of A.P.1
- Caproni Ca.306 – Airliner prototype (1935)
- Caproni Ca.307 – Second production version of A.P.1
- Caproni Ca.308 – Export version of A.P.1 for El Salvador and Paraguay
- Caproni Ca. 308 Borea – Airliner
- Caproni Ca.309 – military light twin
- Caproni Ca.345 – recce floatplane project
- Caproni Ca.350 – Fighter-bomber, reconnaissance aircraft
- Caproni-Reggiane Ca.400 – Caproni-Reggiane-built version of Piaggio P.32 medium bomber
- Caproni Ca.401 – twin-engine recce-fighter
- Caproni Ca.405 – Caproni-built version of Piaggio P.32 medium bomber
- Caproni Ca.410 – twin-engined recce-bomber floatplane project
- Caproni CH.1 – Prototype fighter of 1935
- Caproni PS.1 – Sports aircraft
- Caproni Bergamaschi PL.3 – Long-distance racer aircraft
- Caproni-Pensuti triplane – Sports triplane of 1919
- Caproni Sauro-1 – Two-seat touring aircraft
- Caproni Vizzola F.5 – Fighter of 1939
- Stipa-Caproni – Experimental ducted-fan powered prototype of 1932

=== World War II ===
- Caproni Ca.133 – Transport and bomber
- Caproni Ca.135 – Medium bomber
- Caproni Ca.148 – Civil-military transport version of Ca.133
- Caproni Ca.164 – Trainer and liaison and reconnaissance aircraft
- Caproni Ca.309 Ghibli – Reconnaissance, ground-attack, and transport aircraft
- Caproni Ca.310 Libeccio – Reconnaissance aircraft and light bomber
- Caproni Ca.311 – Light bomber and reconnaissance aircraft
- Caproni Ca.312 – Re-engined version of Ca.310 sold to Norway
- Caproni Ca.313 – Reconnaissance bomber, trainer, and transport
- Caproni Ca.314 – Ground-attack aircraft and torpedo bomber
- Caproni Ca.316 – Seaplane
- Caproni Ca.320 - three-engine bomber
- Caproni Ca.325 – Proposed version of Ca.135 medium bomber with more powerful engines, built in mock-up form only
- Caproni Ca.330 - Project
- Caproni Ca.331 – Prototype tactical reconnaissance aircraft/light bomber (Ca.331 O.A./Ca.331A) of 1940 and prototype night fighter (Ca.331 C.N./Ca.331B) of 1942
- Caproni Ca.332 - Project; derived from Ca.330
- Caproni Ca.335 – Fighter-bomber, reconnaissance aircraft for the Belgian Air Force.
- Caproni Ca.360 - Twin engine dive bomber project
- Caproni Ca.365 - Twin engine bomber project
- Caproni Ca.370 - twin engine combat plane project
- Caproni Ca.375 - twin engine combat plane project
- Caproni Ca.380 - twin-boom fighter project
- Caproni Ca.381 - twin-boom fighter project
- Caproni Campini N.1 – Experimental motorjet-powered aircraft of 1940
- Caproni Campini Ca.183bis – Proposed high-altitude fighter aircraft
- Caproni Vizzola F.4 – Fighter prototype of 1940 with German-made engine
- Caproni Vizzola F.5bis – Proposed version of F.4 with Italian-made engine
- Caproni Vizzola F.6 – Fighter prototype of 1941 (F.6M) and 1943 (F.6Z)

=== Post-World War II ===
- Caproni Ca.193 – Twin-engined six-seat monoplane
- Caproni Ca.195 - jet trainer project
- Caproni Trento F-5 – Lightweight two-seat jet trainer
- Caproni Vizzola Calif – Family of gliders (sailplanes) (A-10, A-12, A-14, A-15, A-20, A-21)
- Caproni Vizzola C22 Ventura – Light jet trainer

==== Wartime Italian Army designations ====
- Caproni Ca.1 (1914) Italian Army designation
  - Caproni Ca.30 (Ca.1 re-designated post-war)
  - Caproni Ca.31 (Ca.1 re-designated post-war)
  - Caproni Ca.32 (Ca.1 re-designated post-war)
  - Caproni Ca.260 (informal designation for initial Ca.1s with total 260hp)
  - Caproni Ca.300 (informal designation for Ca.1s powered by three 100hp engines)
- Caproni Ca.2 (1916) Italian Army designation
  - Caproni Ca.350 (informal designation for Ca.2s powered by 2x100hp and 1x150hp engines)
- Caproni Ca.3 (1916) Italian Army designation
  - Caproni Ca.450 (informal designation for Ca.3s powered by three 150hp engines)
- Caproni Ca.4 (1916) Italian Army designation
- Caproni Ca.5 (1917) Italian Army designation
  - Caproni Ca.600 (informal designation for Ca.5s powered by three 200hp engines)
  - Caproni Ca.750 (informal designation for Ca.5s powered by three 250hp engines)

==== Caproni designations ====
- Caproni-Coanda 1908 glider
- Caproni Ca.1 (1910) biplane
- Caproni Ca.2 (1910) biplane
- Caproni Ca.3 (1911) biplane
- Caproni Ca.4
- Caproni Ca.5 (1911) biplane
- Caproni Ca.6 (1911) biplane
- Caproni Ca.7
- 25hp Caproni monoplane (Cm 1)
- Caproni Ca.8 (1911) monoplane (25hp Caproni monoplane / Cm 1)
- Caproni Ca.9
- Caproni Ca.10
- Caproni Ca.11 (1912) monoplane (Cm 5)
- Caproni Ca.12 (1912) monoplane (Cm 6)
- Caproni Ca.13 (1912) monoplane (Cm 7)
- Caproni Ca.14 (1912) monoplane (Cm 9)
- Caproni Ca.15
- Caproni Ca.16 (1912) monoplane (Cm 12)
- Caproni Ca.17 (1913) monoplane
- Caproni Ca.18 (1913) monoplane
- Caproni Ca.19
- Caproni Ca.20
- Caproni Ca.21
- Caproni Ca.22 (1914) monoplane
- Caproni Ca.23 (1914) monoplane
- Caproni Ca.24 (1914) monoplane
- Caproni Ca.25 (1914) monoplane
- Caproni Ca.30 (Ca.1 - redesignated post-war)
- Caproni Ca.31 (Ca.1 - redesignated post-war)
- Caproni Ca.32 (Ca.1 / Ca.300 - redesignated post-war)
- Caproni Ca.33 (Ca.3 / Ca.450 - redesignated post-war)
- Caproni Ca.34 (Ca.3 / Ca.450 - redesignated post-war)
- Caproni Ca.35 (Ca.3 / Ca.450 - redesignated post-war)
- Caproni Ca.36 (Ca.3 / Ca.450 - redesignated post-war)
- Caproni Ca.37
- Caproni Ca.38 (Ca.37 derivative)
- Caproni Ca.39 (Ca.3 / Ca.450 - seaplane conversion redesignated post-war)
- Caproni Ca.40 (Ca.4 - pre-series batch - redesignated post-war)
- Caproni Ca.41 (Ca.4 - production aircraft - redesignated post-war)
- Caproni Ca.42 (Ca.4 - with 450hp Liberty engines - RNAS))
- Caproni Ca.43 (Ca.4 - a Ca4 converted to floatplane - redesignated post-war)
- Caproni Ca.44 (Ca.5 / Ca.600 - redesignated post-war)
- Caproni Ca.45 (Ca.5 with 250hp IF V.6 engines)
- Caproni Ca.46 (Ca.5 with 450hp Liberty engines - Standard, Curtiss and Fisher production)
- Caproni Ca.47 (I.ca. - Idrovolante Caproni - redesignated postwar)
- Caproni Ca.48 (Ca.4 - airliner version post-war)
- Caproni Ca.50 (Ca.5 - redesignated post-war)
- Caproni Ca.51 (Ca.4 - biplane tail unit - redesignated post-war)
- Caproni Ca.52 (Ca.4 - lower gondola removed - 500kg bomb - redesignated post-war)
- Caproni Ca.53
- Caproni Ca.56 (Ca.3 post-war airliner conversions)
- Caproni Ca.57 (Ca.5 airliner version / conversions
- Caproni Ca.58 (Ca.4 - airliner conversions post-war)
- Caproni Ca.59 (Ca.4 - 5-engined airliner conversions post-war)
- Caproni Ca.60 Transaereo (Ca.4 wings on a triple triplane flying boat hull)
- Caproni Ca.61
- Caproni Ca.66
- Caproni Ca.67
- Caproni Ca.70
- Caproni Ca.71
- Caproni Ca.72
- Caproni Ca.73
- Caproni Ca.74
- Caproni Ca.79
- Caproni Ca.80 (Ca.73 with Bristol Jupiter engines)
- Caproni Ca.82 (Ca.73ter re-designated)
- Caproni Ca.87 Polonia
- Caproni Ca.88
- Caproni Ca.89
- Caproni Ca.90
- Caproni Ca.95
- Caproni Ca.97
- Caproni Ca.100
- Caproni Ca.101
- Caproni Ca.102
- Caproni Ca.103 (Ca.73 derivative)
- Caproni Ca.104
- Caproni Ca.105 (photo only)
- Caproni Ca.107 (un-built)
- Caproni Ca.109
- Caproni Ca.110 (un-built)
- Caproni Ca.111
- Caproni Ca.113
- Caproni Ca.114
- Caproni Ca.120
- Caproni Ca.122
- Caproni Ca.123
- Caproni Ca.124
- Caproni Ca.125
- Caproni Ca.127
- Caproni Ca.131
- Caproni Ca.132
- Caproni Ca.133
- Caproni Ca.134
- Caproni Ca.135
- Caproni Ca.137
- Caproni Ca.140
- Caproni Ca.142
- Caproni Ca.146
- Caproni Ca.148
- Caproni Ca.161
- Caproni Ca.163 (prototype Ca.164)
- Caproni Ca.164
- Caproni Ca.165
- Caproni Ca.166
- Caproni Ca.169
- Caproni Ca.183
- Caproni Ca.191
- Caproni Ca.193
- Caproni Ca.225
- Caproni Ca.301
- Caproni Ca.303
- Caproni Ca.305
- Caproni Ca.306
- Caproni Ca.307
- Caproni Ca.308
- Caproni Ca.308 Borea
- Caproni Ca.309 Ghibli
- Caproni Ca.310 Libeccio
- Caproni Ca.311
- Caproni Ca.312
- Caproni Ca.313
- Caproni Ca.314
- Caproni Ca.316
- Caproni Ca.325
- Caproni Ca.331
- Caproni Ca.335
- Caproni Ca.350 Maestrale
- Caproni Ca.355
- Caproni Ca.405
- Caproni Ca.602
- Caproni Ca.603
- Caproni CH.1
- Caproni I.Ca (Idrovolante Caproni / Ca.47)
- Caproni-Stipa
- Caproni Sauro-1
- Caproni Tricap
- Caproni-Pensuti 2
- Caproni PS.1
- Caproni TM.2
- Caproni QR.14 Levriero

=== Caproni-Bergamaschi ===
(Caproni-Bergamaschi / CAB Cantieri Aeronautici Bergamaschi)

- Caproni A.P.1
- Caproni Bergamaschi PL.3
- Caproni PS.1
- CAB C-1
- CAB C-2
- CAB C-4
- CAB AR-1
- CAB AR-2
- CAB AR-10
- CAB SC-4
- CAB SCA-5
- CAB AP.1

=== Caproni – Campini ===
- Caproni-Campini N.1

=== Caproni-Predappio ===
- Caproni-Predappio Ca.602
- Caproni-Predappio Ca.603

=== Caproni Trento ===
(Aeroplane Caproni Trento)

- Caproni Trento F-5

=== Caproni Vizzola ===
(Caproni-Vizzola S.A. – originally Scuola Aviazioni Caproni)

- Caproni-Vizzola CV.3
- Caproni-Vizzola F.4
- Caproni-Vizzola F.5
- Caproni Vizzola F.6
- Caproni Vizzola F.7
- Caproni Vizzola Calif
- Caproni Vizzola Ventura

=== Carden-Baynes ===
- Carden-Baynes Bee
- Carden-Baynes B-3

=== Cardoen ===
(Industrias Cardoen LtdA)

- Cardoen CB 206L-III

=== Caretti ===
(D. Caretti)

- Caretti helicopter

=== Carins ===
(Carins Aircraft, Naugatuck, CT)

- Carins Model A
- Carins Model AC6
- Carins Model C2
- Carins Pusher Cabin Monoplane

=== Cariou ===
(Louis Cariou)

- Cariou CL3 Sagittaire

=== Carley ===
(Joop D. Carley / Carley Flying School (Vliegvereniging), Ede, 1917)

- Carley 1917 Canard
- Carley S.1 1919
- Carley C.12
- Carley L.II - at NVI 1922 2-seat single-bay biplane trainer
- Carley Baby - at NVI 1922 single-seat shoulder-winged monoplane - aka 'Carly-baby'; aka 'Baby'; aka 'baby-machines'

=== Carlson ===
(Goodwin Carlson, Slayton, MN)

- Carlson Space Saver

=== Carlson ===
((Ernest W) Carlson Aircraft Inc, E Palestine, OH)

- Carlson Sparrow Ultralight
- Carlson Sparrow II
- Carlson Sparrow Sport Special
- Carlson Sparrow II XTC
- Carlson Criquet
- Carlson Skycycle

=== Carma ===
(Carma Manufacturing Co, Tucson, AZ)

- Carma VT-1 Weejet

=== CARMAM ===
(Coopérative d'Approvisionnement et de Réparation de Matériel Aéronautique de Moulins)

- CARMAM 20-90 Impala (Jacquet/Pottier JP20/90 Impala)

=== Carmier ===
(Pierre Carmier)

- Carmier Dupouy T.10

=== Carmier-Arnoux ===
(Pierre Carmier et René Arnoux)

- Carmier-Arnoux 10hp Simplex
- Carmier-Arnoux Simplex (320 hp)

=== Carnes ===
(Joseph R Carnes, Hillsboro, IN)

- Carnes 1931 home-built

=== Carothers ===
(Dr C E 'Chuck' Carothers, Lincoln, NE)

- Aerobatic Midwing Special

=== Carpenter ===
(Merrell L Carpenter, Joplin, MO and New Orleans, LA)

- Carpenter Special
- Carpenter Little Dea Dea

=== Carplane GmbH ===
(Braunschweig, Germany)

- Carplane GmbH Carplane

=== Carr ===
(Walter J Carr, Saginaw, MI, 1924: CSC Aircraft Co (Carr, John Coryell, Edward & Walter Savage), Saginaw, MI)

- CSC Maiden Saginaw
- Carr Special aka Junior

=== Carroll ===
- Carroll A2 – info required – French World War I observation aircraft competition loser

=== Carroll ===
(Raymond Carroll)

- Carroll 1920 biplane

=== Carson ===
((Franklin) Carson Helicopters Inc, Perkasie, PA)

- Carson Super C-4

=== Carstedt ===
(Carstedt Inc., Long Beach, CA)

- Carstedt Jet Liner 600

=== CarterCopter ===
(1994: CarterCopters LLC (pres: Jay Carter Jr), Wichita Falls, TX)

- CarterCopter
- Carter PAV

=== Carter-Maxwell ===
((Don J) Carter-(Arnold B) Maxwell Co, RFD 4, N Kansas City, MO)

- Carter-Maxwell C-M-2

=== CASA ===
(Construcciones Aeronáuticas SA)

- CASA I
- CASA III
- CASA 1.131 Jungmann license-built version of the Bücker Bü 131
- CASA 1.133 Jungmeister license-built version of the Bücker Bü 133
- CASA 2.111 license-built version of the Heinkel 111
- CASA 352 license-built version of the Junkers Ju 52
- CASA C-101 Aviojet
- CASA C-102
- CASA C.127 license-built version of the Dornier Do 27
- CASA C-201 Alcotán
- CASA C-202 Halcón
- CASA C-207 Azor
- CASA C-212 Aviocar
- CASA C-223 Flamingo license-built version of the MBB 223 Flamingo
- CASA/IPTN CN-235
- CASA C-295
- CASA SF-5A; license-built version of the Northrop F-5A
- CASA SF-5B; license-built version of the Northrop F-5B
- CASA SRF-5A; license-built version of the Northrop RF-5A
- CASA 3000; regional airliner – project abandoned in 1994.

=== Cascade ===
(Cascade Ultralites)

- Cascade Kasperwing I-80

=== Casey Jones ===
(JVW Corp, Newark, NJ)

- Casey Jones Flying Boat

=== Caspar ===
(Caspar-Werke)

- Caspar C V
- Caspar U 1
- Caspar U 2
- Caspar F 4
- Caspar S 1
- Caspar S 2
- Caspar CT 1
- Caspar CT 2
- Caspar CT 3
- Caspar CT 4
- Caspar CT 5
- Caspar CLE 11
- Caspar CLE 12
- Caspar CJ 14
- Caspar SJ
- Caspar CS 14
- Caspar CC 15
- Caspar CLE 16
- Caspar C 17
- Caspar CST 18
- Caspar C 23
- Caspar C 24
- Caspar C 26
- Caspar C 27
- Caspar C 29
- Caspar C 30
- Caspar LE 30
- Caspar C 32
- Caspar C 33
- Caspar C 35
- Caspar C 36
- Caspar D.I

=== Cassutt ===
(Designer: Tom Cassutt)

- Cassutt Special
- Cassutt II
- Cassutt III

=== Castaibert ===
(Paul (Pablo) Castaibert)

- Castaibert I 1910
- Castaibert II 1911
- Castaibert III 1912
- Castaibert IV 1913
- Castaibert V 1914
- Castaibert VI 1915
- Castaibert VII 1915

=== Castel ===
(Robert Castello)

- Castel Yanapour II
- Castel Casoar
- Castel C-24
- Castel C-24S
- Castel C-242
- Castel C-25S
- Castel C-301S
- Castel C-31P
- Castel C-310P
- Castel C-311P
- Castel C-32
- Castel C-34 Condor
- Castel C-36

=== Castel-Mauboussin ===
- Castel-Mauboussin CM Jalon
- Castel-Mauboussin CM.7
- Castel-Mauboussin CM.71
- Castel-Mauboussin CM.8
- Castel-Mauboussin CM.88
- Castel-Mauboussin CM.10
- Castel-Mauboussin CM.100
- Castel-Mauboussin CM.101

=== Castiglioni ===
(Angelo and Alfredo Castiglioni)

- Castiglioni Dragon Fly 333

=== CAT ===
(Construzioni Aeronautiche Taliedo)

- CAT TM.2.
- CAT QR.14

=== CATA ===
(Construction Aeronautique de Technologie Avancee)

- CATA LMK.1 ORYX

=== CATA ===
(Compañia Argentina de Trabajos Aéreos)

- CATA (Fleet) 150

=== Cato ===
(Cato Aircraft and Engine Corp)

- Cato 1909 Biplane
- Cato 1910 Monoplane
- Cato 1911 pusher biplane
- Cato Bounds
- Cato-LWF Butterfly
- Cato Sport Plane

=== Catron & Fisk ===
(1917: (J W) Catron & (Edwin) Fisk, 732 Marine St, Venice, CA, 1925: Reorganized as International Aircraft Corp.)

- Catron & Fisk CF-10 Dole racer
- Catron & Fisk CF-11
- Catron & Fisk CF-13
- Catron & Fisk CF-14 Triplane
- Catron & Fisk Sport Triplane
- Catron & Fisk Triplane airliner

=== Catt ===
(Carlos E Catt, Petersburg, IN)

- Catt 1935 monoplane

=== Caudron ===
(Gaston et René Caudron)

- Hydroaéroplane Caudron-Fabre
- Caudron A
- Caudron Airframe
- Caudron B
- Caudron B.2
- Caudron B Multiplace
- Caudron D
- Caudron F
- Caudron G
- Caudron G.2
- Caudron G.3
- Caudron G.4
- Caudron G.5 A3
- Caudron G.6 A2
- Caudron H
- Caudron J
- Caudron J Marine
- Caudron K
- Caudron L
- Caudron M
- Caudron M2
- Caudron N
- Caudron O
- Caudron R
- Caudron R.II (mis-identified R.11!!)
- Caudron R.3
- Caudron R.4
- Caudron R.5
- Caudron R.8 (R.4 Type 8)
- Caudron R.9
- Caudron R.10
- Caudron R.11 A3 spec.
- Caudron R.12
- Caudron R.14
- Caudron R.19 (R.4 Type 19)
- Caudron C.02 (1917 – high altitude fighter)
- Caudron C.17A2
- Caudron C.20
- Caudron C.21
- Caudron C.22
- Caudron C.23
- Caudron C.25
- Caudron C.26
- Caudron C.27
- Caudron C.33
- Caudron C.34
- Caudron C.37
- Caudron C.39
- Caudron C.43
- Caudron C.53
- Caudron C.55
- Caudron C.59
- Caudron C.60
- Caudron C.61
- Caudron C.61bis
- Caudron C.65
- Caudron C.66
- Caudron C.67
- Caudron C.68
- Caudron C.74
- Caudron C.81
- Caudron C.91
- Caudron C.97
- Caudron C.99
- Caudron C.101
- Caudron C.103
- Caudron C.104
- Caudron C.107
- Caudron C.109
- Caudron C.110
- Caudron C.112
- Caudron C.113
- Caudron C.114
- Caudron C.116
- Caudron C.117
- Caudron C.125
- Caudron C.127
- Caudron C.128
- Caudron C.128/2
- Caudron C.140
- Caudron C.157
- Caudron C.159
- Caudron C.161
- Caudron C.168
- Caudron C.180
- Caudron C.183
- Caudron C.190
- Caudron C.191
- Caudron C.192
- Caudron C.193
- Caudron P.V. 200 (designer P. de Viscaya)
- Caudron C.220
- Caudron C.221
- Caudron C.230
- Caudron C.232
- Caudron C.240
- Caudron C.251
- Caudron A.260
- Caudron C.270 Luciole
- Caudron C.271 Luciole
- Caudron C.272 Luciole
- Caudron C.273 Luciole
- Caudron C.274 Luciole
- Caudron C.275 Luciole
- Caudron C.276 Luciole
- Caudron C.277 Luciole
- Caudron C.278 Luciole
- Caudron C.280 Phalene
- Caudron C.282 Super Phalene
- Caudron C.286 Super Phalene
- Caudron C.289 Super Phalene
- Caudron C.340 Micro Phalene
- Caudron C.344 Phalène Junior
- Caudron C.360
- Caudron C.362
- Caudron C.366
- Caudron C.400 Super Phalene
- Caudron C.401 Super Phalene
- Caudron C.410 Super Phalene
- Caudron C.430 Rafale
- Caudron C.430/1
- Caudron C.440 Goéland
- Caudron C.441 Goéland
- Caudron C.444 Goéland
- Caudron C.445 Goéland
- Caudron C.446 Goéland
- Caudron C.447 Goéland
- Caudron C.448 Goéland
- Caudron C.449 Goéland
- Caudron C.450
- Caudron C.460
- Caudron C.461
- Caudron C.480 Frégate
- Caudron C.490
- Caudron C.491
- Caudron C.500 Simoun I
- Caudron C.510 Pélican
- Caudron C.520 Simoun
- Caudron C.530 Rafale
- Caudron C.560
- Caudron C.561
- Caudron C.570 Kangourou
- Caudron C.580
- Caudron C.600 Aiglon
- Caudron C.601 Aiglon
- Caudron C.610 Aiglon
- Caudron C.620 Simoun IV
- Caudron C.630 Simoun
- Caudron C.631 Simoun
- Caudron C.632 Simoun
- Caudron C.634 Simoun
- Caudron C.635 Simoun
- Caudron C.640 Typhon
- Caudron C.641 Typhon
- Caudron C.660 Rafale
- Caudron C.670 Typhon
- Caudron C.680
- Caudron C.684
- Caudron C.685 Super Rafale
- Caudron C.690
- Caudron C.710 Cyclone
- Caudron C.711 Cyclone
- Caudron C.712 Cyclone
- Caudron C.713 Cyclone
- Caudron C.714 Cyclone
- Caudron C.720 Cyclone
- Caudron-Renault CR.760 Cyclone
- Caudron-Renault CR.770 Cyclone
- Caudron C.800
- Caudron C.860
- Caudron C.870
- Caudron C.880
- Caudron KXC
- Caudron Navy Experimental Type C Trainer

=== Cavalier ===
(Cavalier Aircraft Corp., Sarasota, FL)

- Executive Mustang
- Cavalier 750
- Cavalier 1200
- Cavalier 1500
- Cavalier 2000
- Cavalier 2500
- Cavalier Mustang II
- Cavalier Turbo Mustang III

=== Cavarroc ===
(Raymond Cavarroc)

- Cavarroc RC.01 Minishinden

=== Cavasino ===
(Victor Cavasino, Bismarck, ND)

- Cavasino A

=== Cavassilas ===
(Pierre Cavassilas)

- Cavassilas CCJ.01
- Cavassilas CCJ.200

=== Cavenaugh ===
(Cavenaugh Aviation Inc.)

- Cavenaugh Cargoliner

=== Caviezel ===
- Caviezel Sport 1

=== CBB ===
(CBB ULM)

- CBB O2

=== CCF ===
(Canadian Car and Foundry)

- CCF-Burnelli CBY-3
- CCF FDB-1
- CCF F.A.T. 2 Maple Leaf
- CCF SBW Helldiver
