= CANSA C.4 =

Tandem seat aircraft

C.4

General information
- Type: Trainer/tourer
- National origin: Italy
- Manufacturer: Construzioni Aeonautiche Novaresi S.A (CANSA)

History
- First flight: 1942

The CANSA C.4 was a single engine, open cockpit, tandem seat training aircraft and tourer flown in Italy in 1942.

== Design and development ==
The last of a series of three CANSA trainer designs, preceded by the C.5 and C.6, the C.4 was the only monoplane. It had a low, straight tapered wing; no flaps were fitted. The empennage was conventional, with the tailplane mounted on top of the fuselage. The elevators were split so that the unbalanced rudder, which extended to the bottom of the fuselage, could move between them. The fin and rudder together were straight edged and round topped.

The fabric covered fuselage was flat sided, with a rounded decking. The two occupants sat in separate cockpits, the forward one at the wing leading edge and the second close behind over mid-chord. The cockpits were open but fitted with windscreens and short sidescreens. The C.4 was powered by a 67 kW (90 hp), 4-cylinder inline, air-cooled, inverted CANSA C.80 engine. It had a fixed, conventional undercarriage with a tailskid.

The C.4 was built as both a training aircraft and a tourer but production numbers are not known.

== Specifications ==
Data from Italian Civil and Military Aircraft 1930-1945

General characteristics

- Capacity: 2
- Wingspan: 12.12 m (39 ft 9 in)
- Wing area: 12.10 m^{2} (130.2 sq ft)
- Empty weight: 400 kg (882 lb)
- Gross weight: 640 kg (1,411 lb)
- Powerplant: 1 × CANSA C.80 4-cylinder inverted air-cooled in-line, 67 kW (90 hp)
- Propellers: 2-bladed

Performance

- Maximum speed: 216 km/h (134 mph, 116 kn)
- Range: 640 km (400 mi, 350 nmi)
- Service ceiling: 4,160 m (13,650 ft)
