= Caproni Ca.142 =

Three-engine multirole aircraft

General information
- Type: Transport/Light bomber
- Manufacturer: Caproni
- Primary user: Regia Aeronautica
- Number built: 1

History
- First flight: November 1935

The Caproni Ca.142 was a three-engined multirole aircraft built by Caproni in the mid-1930s.

== Design ==
The Ca.142 was a high-wing trimotor monoplane which differed from the Caproni Ca.133 in having a new landing gear with the retractable front elements to replace the fixed one of its predecessor. Flight results expressed by the Ca.142 failed to achieve the desired results, and the Ca.142 in September 1937 was handed over to the Regia Aeronautica, which allocated it the registration MM 327.

== Specifications ==
Data from , Aeroplani Caproni – Gianni Caproni ideatore e costruttore di ali italiane

General characteristics

- Crew: 4
- Length: 15.45 m (50 ft 8 in)
- Wingspan: 21.44 m (70 ft 4 in)
- Height: 4 m (13 ft 1 in)
- Wing area: 65 m^{2} (700 sq ft)
- Empty weight: 4,425 kg (9,755 lb)
- Gross weight: 6,925 kg (15,267 lb)
- Powerplant: 3 × Piaggio Stella P.VII C.16 7-cylinder air cooled radial piston engines, 338 kW (453 hp) each
- Powerplant: 2 × metal propellers

Performance

- Maximum speed: 286 km/h (178 mph, 154 kn)
- Cruise speed: 250 km/h (160 mph, 130 kn)

Armament

- Guns: 4 x 7.7 mm (0.303 in) Breda-SAFAT machine guns
- Bombs: 2 x 500 kg (1,100 lb) bombs

== See also ==
Related development

- Caproni Ca.133

Related lists

- List of bomber aircraft
- List of Interwar military aircraft
