= Castel C-301S =

1940s French glider

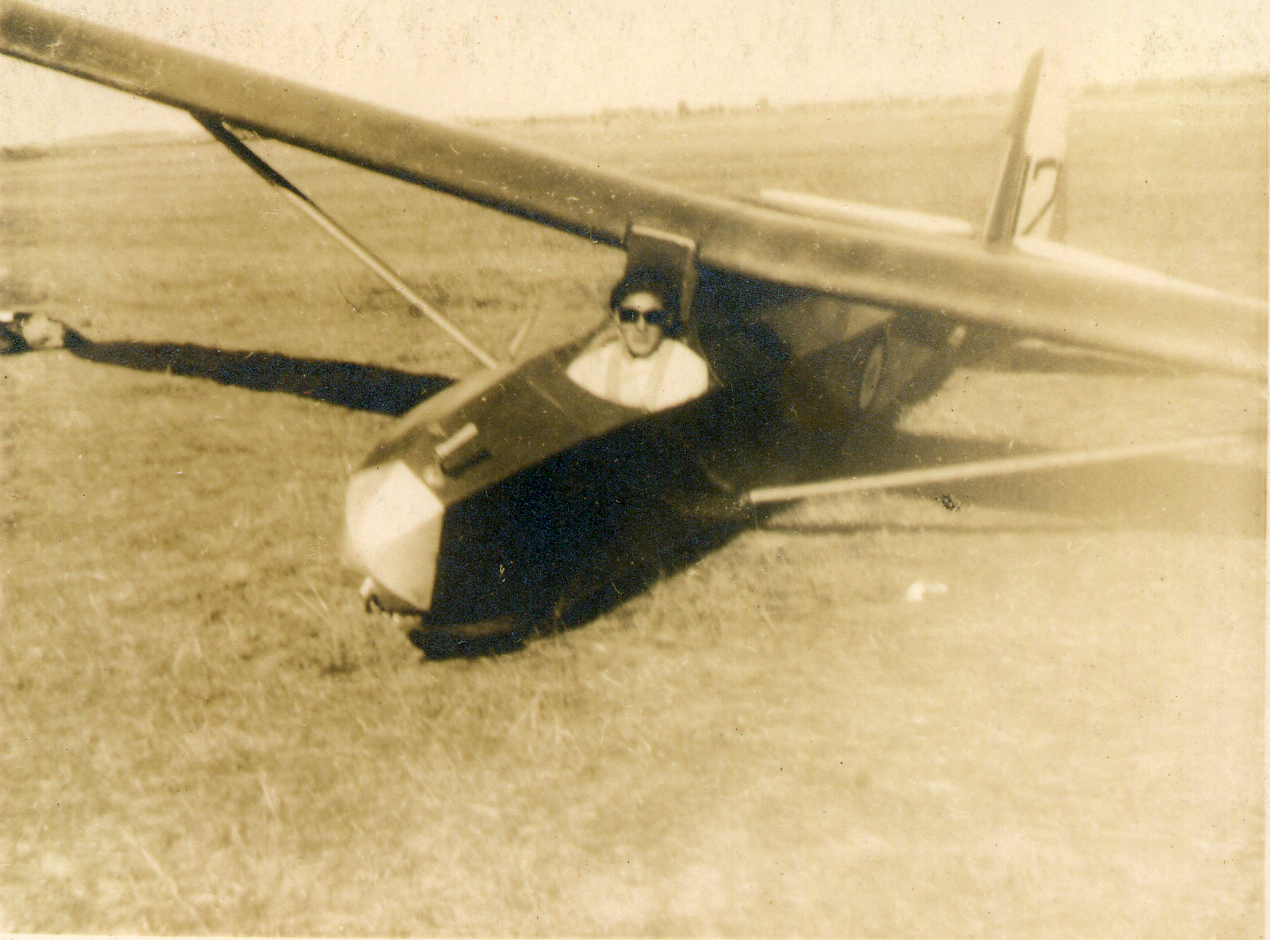

General information
- Type: Training glider
- National origin: France
- Manufacturer: Castel
- Number built: 315

History
- First flight: 1945

The Castel C-301S was a training glider built in the early 1940s in France. It was a glider of high-wing monoplane configuration.

== Specifications ==
Data from

General characteristics

- Crew: One
- Length: 6.20 m (20 ft 4 in)
- Wingspan: 12.28 m (40 ft 3 in)
- Height: 1.78 m (5 ft 10 in)
- Wing area: 14.66 m^{2} (157.8 sq ft)
- Aspect ratio: 10.28
- Empty weight: 130 kg (287 lb)
- Gross weight: 217 kg (478 lb)

Performance

- Maximum glide ratio: 18

== Bibliography ==
- Cortet, Pierre (April 2000). "Rétros du Mois" [Retros of the Month]. Avions: Toute l'aéronautique et son histoire (in French) (85): 5. ISSN 1243-8650.
