= Campbell Model F =

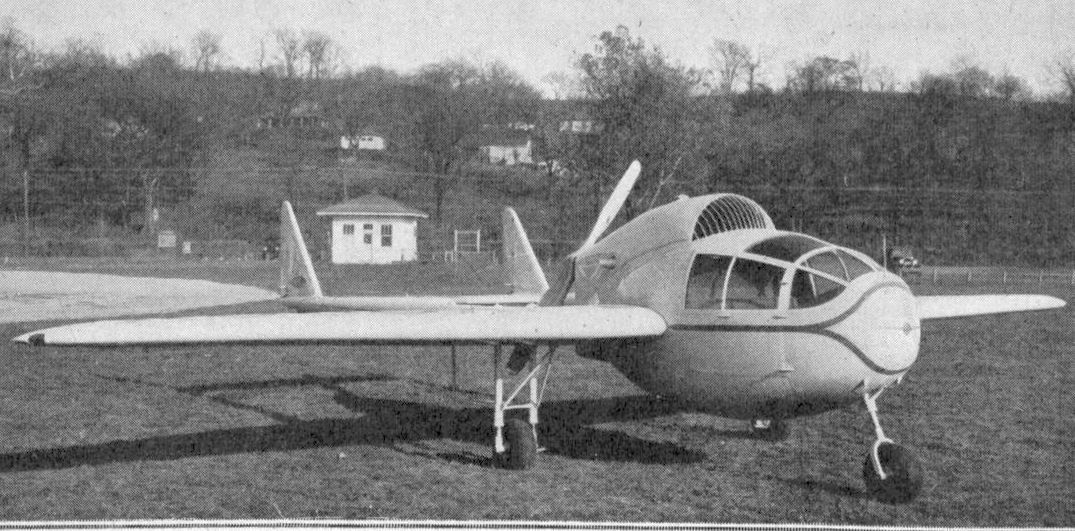

General information
- Type: Two seat private aircraft
- National origin: United States
- Manufacturer: Campbell Aircraft Co., St Joseph, MO
- Designer: Mervyn Campbell
- Number built: 1

History
- First flight: 1935

The Campbell Model F, a pusher configuration, two seat sport aircraft built in the 1930s, was unconventional in its day with its empennage on twin, slim booms, a cockpit under stepless, rounded, multi-panel glazing and a tricycle undercarriage.

== Design and development ==
The Campbell Model A was an all metal aircraft. Its mid-set wing was built around single box spars with light fore and aft sections attached to them. These gave it a rectangular plan centre section and trapezoidal outer panels, ending in rounded tips. Long, narrow chord ailerons were mounted on the outer panels. There were flaps on the wing undersides near the trailing edges.

The Model F had a short, ovoid fuselage nacelle which just reached to the wing trailing edge. Its 100 hp (75 kW) adapted Ford V-8 engine was mounted on top of the nacelle on rubber blocks, positioned over the spar with its pusher propeller barely beyond the trailing edge. Its radiator was just aft of the roof of its cabin, which had streamlined, multi-panel glazing rather than a windscreen. The cabin seated two side by side, sharing a central throw-over control column for training. Each seat had rudder pedals that could be removed for a passenger.

The tail was carried on a pair of slim, monocoque booms from the spar at the ends of the inner wing panels, placed just far enough apart to accommodate the propeller disk. Its tailplane was rectangular in plan and the twin fins triangular in profile, respectively carrying a narrow chord elevator and blunted, rectangular rudders.

The main landing wheels, with hydraulic brakes, were each on a short axle with parallel Bendix shock absorber legs to the spar. There was a V-form drag strut reaching forward. Each leg was also the forward attachment point of a tapering girder on the tailboom underside. The fork-mounted nose-wheel was steerable from the rudder pedals.

== Operational history ==
The Model F first flew in 1935, though the exact date is unknown. By 1937, if not earlier, it was making demonstration flights including one from Bolling Air Force Base. It was damaged in another demonstration and was not repaired.

== Specifications ==
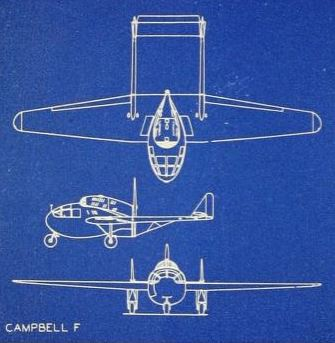

Data from

General characteristics

- Crew: one
- Capacity: one passenger or pupil
- Length: 19 ft 4 in (5.89 m)
- Wingspan: 36 ft (11 m)
- Height: 6 ft 6 in (1.98 m)
- Wing area: 145 sq ft (13.5 m^{2})
- Empty weight: 1,240 lb (562 kg)
- Gross weight: 1,775 lb (805 kg)
- Payload: 205 lb (93 kg)
- Fuel capacity: 25 US gal (21 imp gal; 95 L)
- Powerplant: 1 × converted Ford V-8 , 100 hp (75 kW) at 4,000 rpm.
- Propellers: 2-bladed Fahlin

Performance

- Maximum speed: 112 mph (180 km/h, 97 kn)
- Cruise speed: 97 mph (156 km/h, 84 kn)
- Landing speed (flaps down): 48 mph (77 km/h; 42 kn)
- Range: 350 mi (560 km, 300 nmi)
- Service ceiling: 12,000 ft (3,700 m)
- Rate of climb: 350 ft/min (1.8 m/s)
