= Castel-Mauboussin CM.7 =

Two-seat French glider, 1948

CM.7

General information
- Type: High-performance sailplane
- Manufacturer: Fouga
- Designer: Robert Castello
- Number built: 2

History
- First flight: 22 July 1948

The Castel-Mauboussin CM.7 was a high performance sailplane built in France in 1948 and used to establish a large number of altitude and duration records into the early 1950s. Conceived of by designer Robert Castello at his home in 1942, it was not until after the war that he had the opportunity to actually build it. It was a two-seat aircraft with a gull wing and conventional empennage.

Apart from a string of French national records for both men's and women's flight in a two-seat glider, the CM.7 set a number of world records, beginning in 1951 with women's records for altitude (7,042 m) and gain in altitude (6,072 m) on 18 January, and duration (28 hours 41 minutes) on 23 November, piloted by Marcelle Choisnet and Yvette Mazelier. The following year, a new men's record for duration (53 hours, 4 minutes) was set on 6 February by Albert Carraz and Jean Branswick, with a CM.7 used to break this same record by Claude Fronteau and Jacques Lebeau on 30 December 1953 (56 hours 11 minutes). Finally, on 11 January 1954, a CM.7 piloted by Jacqueline Mathé and Marinette Garbarino broke the women's duration record again, this time with a flight of 38 hours 11 minutes. None of these still stand in 2007.

== Specifications ==
General characteristics

- Crew: Two pilots
- Length: 8.47 m (27 ft 9 in)
- Wingspan: 18.00 m (59 ft 0 in)
- Height: 2.25 m (7 ft 5 in)
- Wing area: 22.3 m^{2} (240 sq ft)
- Aspect ratio: 14.6
- Empty weight: 400 kg (880 lb)
- Gross weight: 566 kg (1,248 lb)

Performance

- Maximum speed: 85 km/h (53 mph, 46 kn)
- Rate of sink: 1.4 m/s (276 ft/min)
