= Castel C-242 =

1940s French glider

General information
- Type: Training glider
- National origin: France
- Manufacturer: Castel
- Number built: 20

History
- First flight: 11 December 1941

The Castel C-242 was a training glider built in the early 1940s in France. It was a glider of high-wing monoplane configuration.

== Specifications ==
Data from

General characteristics

- Crew: Two
- Length: 8.00 m (26 ft 3 in)
- Wingspan: 18.00 m (59 ft 1 in)
- Height: 2.18 m (7 ft 2 in)
- Wing area: 21.75 m^{2} (234.1 sq ft)
- Aspect ratio: 21.6
- Empty weight: 258 kg (569 lb)
- Gross weight: 432 kg (952 lb)

Performance
