= Capital Machinery Factory Capital-1 =

Capital-1

General information
- Type: Light transport/utility aircraft
- National origin: PRC
- Manufacturer: Capital Machinery Factory
- Number built: 1

History
- First flight: 29 September 1958

The Capital Machinery Factory Capital-1 was a twin-engined monoplane light transport/utility aircraft designed and built in the People's Republic of China at Beijing in the late 1950s.

== Design and development ==
The late 1950s saw a great leap in capability for the Chinese aviation industry with a wealth of indigenously designed aircraft projects, one of which was the Capital-1. The Capital-1 bore a close resemblance to the contemporary Antonov An-14 Ptchelka, being twin-engined, twin-tailed with strut supported monoplane wings and fixed tricycle undercarriage, stub lower wing bracing the undercarriage and wing struts and a podlike fuselage terminating in a boom carrying the tail-unit.

Powered by two 119.3 kW (160 hp) M-11FR engines in helmeted cowlings, the Capital-1 had a mediocre performance with relatively short range and limited payload. Production of the aircraft was not continued past the prototype stage.

== Specifications (Capital-1) ==
Data from Chinese Aircraft:China's aviation industry since 1951

General characteristics

- Capacity: 870 kg (1,918.0 lb) payload, (8 passengers with no luggage or 6 passengers with 15 kg (33.1 lb) each).
- Length: 9.502 m (31 ft 2 in)
- Wingspan: 16.64 m (54 ft 7 in)
- Height: 3.955 m (13 ft 0 in)
- Max takeoff weight: 2,400 kg (5,291 lb)
- Powerplant: 2 × M-11FR 5-cyl. air-cooled radial piston engines, 120 kW (160 hp) each

Performance

- Maximum speed: 185 km/h (115 mph, 100 kn)
- Range: 658 km (409 mi, 355 nmi)

== See also ==
Aircraft of comparable role, configuration, and era

- Antonov An-14 Ptchelka
- Scottish Aviation Twin Pioneer
- Britten-Norman BN-2 Islander

Related lists List of aircraft
