= Caspar C 17 =

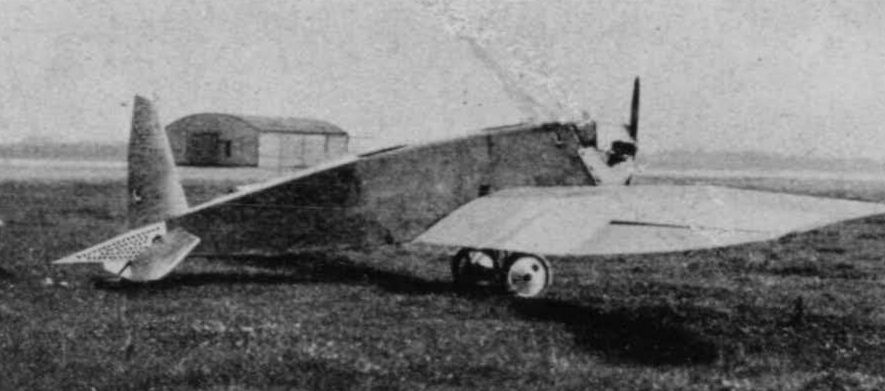

General information
- Type: Two seat ultralight
- National origin: Germany
- Manufacturer: Caspar-Travermünde Flugzeugerke
- Designer: Ernst Ritter von Loessel

History
- First flight: 1924

The Caspar C 17 was a mid-1920s German, low power, two seat ultralight aircraft with a cantilever wing of unusually high aspect ratio, flexibly attached to the fuselage to moderate gust effects.

== Design and development ==
The chief aim of Ernst Ritter von Loessel, the C 17's designer, was to produce a light two-seater with just enough power to be useful as a touring, sports or training aircraft whilst being economical to fly. Fuel economy further was enhanced by its clean, low wing, cantilever monoplane layout.

Each wing had an unswept inner part with constant chord and a constant, thick section. The outer panels, which carried the ailerons, were slightly tapered in plan and strongly thinned outwards to angled tips. The aspect ratio of 9.2 was high for the time, lowering the low speed induced drag. Each was built around two box section spars, longitudinally cross-braced with steel tubes and plywood-skinned. The most unusual feature was that the wing root mounting allowed spring-restrained variations of the angle of attack. The wings could pivot around a horizontal, span-wise axis just behind the forward spar, with a spring-loaded bolt at the rear spar. This was intended to make the lightweight C 17 less sensitive to gusts and also to exploit the Knoller-Betz effect by which some gust energy is converted into thrust and lift by a plunging wing. Von Loessel had earlier designed a glider incorporating flexible wings to use this effect but the C 17 developed the idea with an elevator-wing cross-connection to maintain trim.

The fuselage was based on a steel tube, rectangular section inner structure, covered by plywood fastened to stringers. Its ABC Scorpion flat twin, simply cowled with its cylinder heads exposed for cooling, produced a maximum power of 22 kW (30 hp) at 3,200 rpm. Behind the engine there were two cockpits in tandem, one near the wing leading edge and the other just aft of the trailing edge. The empennage was unusual, as both horizontal and vertical surfaces were all-moving. Both were polygonal in plan, with the elevator mounted at mid-fuselage height and the rudder tall and narrow above it.

The C 17 had a fixed, tailskid undercarriage with the mainwheels 1.0 m (3 ft 3 in) apart on a faired axle. The axle was mounted on V-struts from the outer, lower tubes of the fuselage frame, one transversely to its centre and two longitudinal pairs to its ends.

The exact date of the C 17's first flight is not known but it was reported in November 1924 that the aircraft was completed "some while ago" and that it "flew quite well with its small British engine". Level flight could be maintained at an engine speed of 2,200 rpm which produced 12 kW (16 hp). Despite this, little more was heard about it and it was not one of the several Caspar aircraft to take part in the 1925 Round-Germany Flight.

== Specifications ==
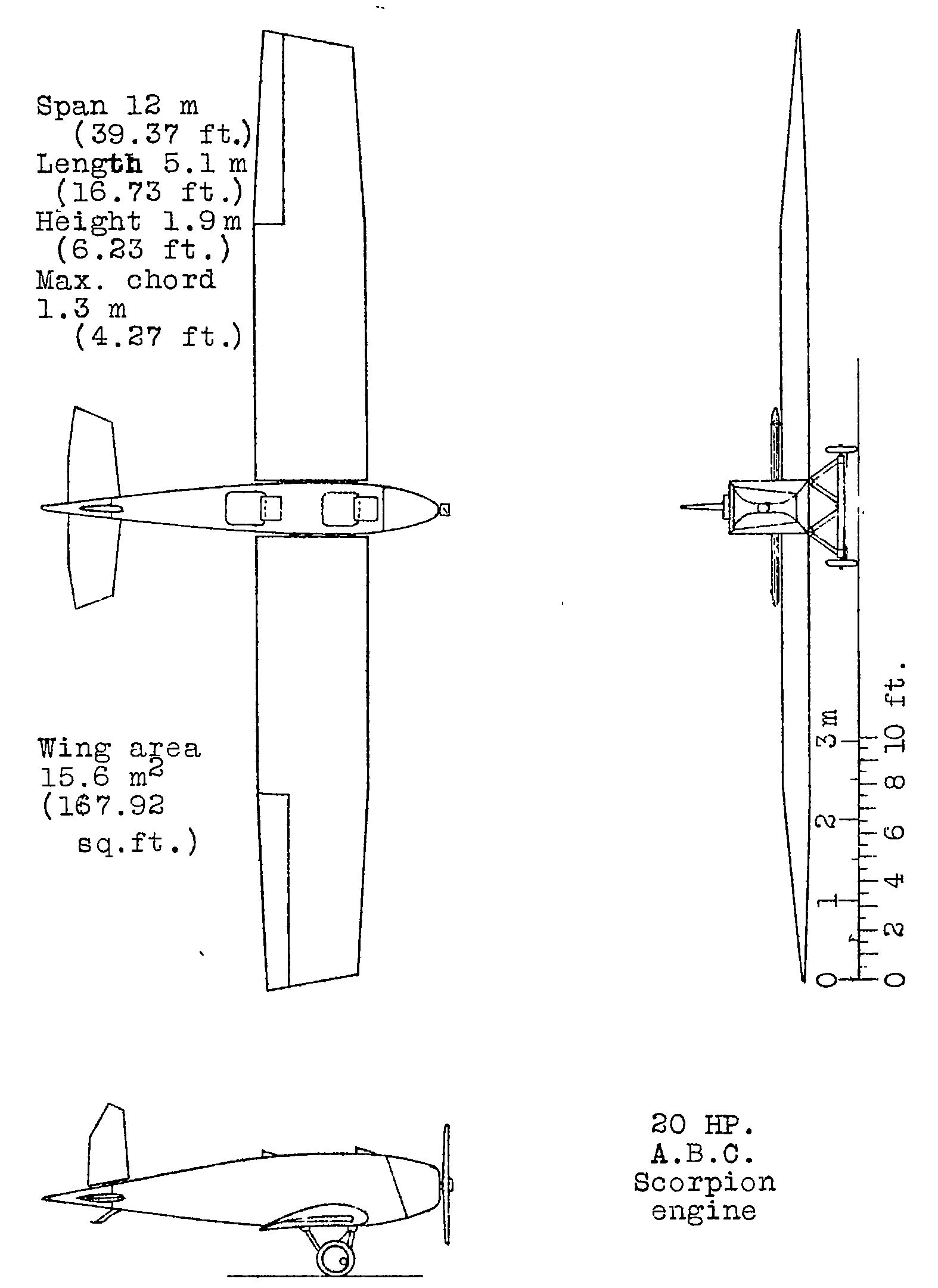
Caspar C.17 3-view drawing from NACA-TM-301

Data from Les Ailes, January 1925

General characteristics

- Crew: Two
- Length: 5.10 m (16 ft 9 in)
- Wingspan: 12.0 m (39 ft 4 in)
- Height: 1.90 m (6 ft 3 in)
- Wing area: 15.60 m^{2} (167.9 sq ft)
- Aspect ratio: 9.2
- Airfoil: Göttingen 348
- Empty weight: 145 kg (320 lb)
- Gross weight: 325 kg (717 lb)
- Powerplant: 1 × ABC Scorpion air-cooled flat twin, 22 kW (30 hp) maximum, at 3,200 rpm
- Propellers: 2-bladed Bork, 1.2 m (3 ft 11 in) diameter

Performance

- Maximum speed: 110–120 km/h (68–75 mph, 59–65 kn)
- Range: 200–250 km (120–160 mi, 110–130 nmi)
- Endurance: 2.0-2.5 hrs
- Service ceiling: 3,500 m (11,500 ft)
- Time to altitude: 12 min to 1,000 m (3,300 ft)
- Take-off distance: 40–60 m (130–200 ft)
- Landing speed: 60 km/h (37 mph)
