= Caproni Ca.7 =

1910s proposed Italian aircraft

- Side view of Caproni Ca.7

General information
- Type: Pioneering aircraft
- Manufacturer: Caproni
- Status: Paper project only
- Number built: 0

History
- First flight: Never flew

The Caproni Ca.7 was a proposed biplane designed by Caproni in the early 1910s.

== Design ==
The Ca.7 was an all-wood biplane equipped with a double horizontal fletching system, mounted respectively at the front and rear ends of the fuselage . The project involved the installation of two "tandem" engines inside the fuselage, which would have to accommodate, in addition to the pilot (housed at the front end, just behind the bow landing), two passengers (seated behind the engines).

The aircraft had two pushing propellers, driven by chain drive devices from the engines housed in the fuselage; the two engines were connected by friction clutches, so that they could work together or separately. Precisely because of the design difficulties involved in the use of two engines, both housed in the fuselage, one at a time should have been turned off, even in flight, for cooling needs, but prevented the construction of the airplane, which therefore he remained at the project stage.

Although, the Ca.7 never left the drawing board, its design contributed to the development of the multiengine Caproni bombers of World War I.

== Specifications ==
Top view

Data from Aeroplani Caproni – Gianni Caproni ideatore e costruttore di ali italiane

General characteristics

- Crew: 2
- Capacity: 2 passengers
- Length: 9.65 m (31 ft 8 in)
- Wingspan: 12 m (39 ft 4 in)
- Height: 3 m (9 ft 10 in)
- Wing area: 36 m^{2} (390 sq ft)
- Empty weight: 475 kg (1,047 lb)
- Gross weight: 675 kg (1,488 lb)
- Powerplant: 2 × Rebus 50hp 4-cyl in-line water-cooled piston engines, 37 kW (50 hp) each
- Propellers: 2-bladed fixed pitch propellers

Performance

== See also ==
- Giovanni Battista Caproni
