= Castel-Mauboussin CM Jalon =

Two-seat French glider, 1944

Jalon

General information
- Type: Two seat research glider
- National origin: France
- Manufacturer: Fouga
- Designer: Robert Castello and Pierre Mauboussin
- Number built: 2

History
- First flight: c.1944

The Castel-Mauboussin CM Jalon or Fouga Jalon two seat glider was designed in France towards the end of World War II for aerodynamic research, providing enough lift and space for measuring instruments and an operator. Two were built.

== Design and development ==
The Jalon was designed and built specifically to the requirements of the Groupement Français pour le Developpement des Researches Aéronautiques (G.R.A), who wanted a glider carrying an observer and electronic equipment for in-flight aerodynamic measurements. To this end, the Jalon could carry some 50 kg (110 lb) of instrumentation. It was a wooden aircraft with a mid set cantilever wing built around a single spar and covered with plywood skin. The wing had a central, constant chord section and tapered panels beyond half span, with rounded wing tips.

The fuselage was a wooden monocoque of oval cross-section which tapered constantly to the tail from a rather bulbous nose. The tandem cockpits were covered by a long, continuously glazed, multi-framed canopy without a windscreen step or other break in the smooth upper fuselage line. The observer's section, split into two by the wing spar, was unusually long to accommodate his instruments; he also had a pair of circular windows on each side, looking out under the wing root. The Jalon's tailplane was mounted a little above the fuselage on a shallow dorsal step, positioned ahead of the narrow chord fin. Both elevators and the generous, deep rudder were horn balanced; the rudder also carried a trim tab. There was a nose skid and monowheel undercarriage, the wheel semi-recessed at the end of the skid.

== Operational history ==
Two Jalons were built. The first was acquired by the Germans as they retreated from France in November 1944 and it is not certain if it flew, before or after transport to Germany. The second made its first flight on 22 September 1945. It was initially based at Toulouse, moving in May 1947 to the Office National d'Études et de Recherches Aérospatiales (ONERA) at Brétigny-sur-Orge and making measurements with a variety of external probes attached until at least 1953.

== Specifications ==
Data from Jane's All the World's Aircraft 1949

General characteristics

- Crew: Two
- Length: 7.78 m (25 ft 6 in)
- Wingspan: 14.1 m (46 ft 3 in)
- Height: 2.33 m (7 ft 8 in)
- Wing area: 18.4 m^{2} (198 sq ft)
- Aspect ratio: 10.8
- Empty weight: 322 kg (710 lb)
- Gross weight: 525 kg (1,157 lb)

Performance

- Maximum glide ratio: 26:1 at 95 km/h (59 mph; 51 kn)
- Rate of sink: 0.9 m/s (180 ft/min) minimum at 85 kmh (53 mph; 46 kn)
