= CNT-II =

Italian seaplane

General information
- Type: Racer
- National origin: Italy
- Manufacturer: Cantieri Navale Triestino (CNT)
- Designer: Alessandro Guidoni
- Number built: 2

History
- First flight: May 1924
- Retired: 1924

The CNT-II was a single-engine biplane flying boat built by the Italian shipyard Cantiere Navale Triestino (CNT) in 1924.

== Design and development ==
It was built to participate in the 1925 edition of the Schneider Cup. The CNT-II was powered by a pusher 465 hp (347 kW) V12 motor engine. Both aircraft sank during the flotation trials. Although recovered and sent for repairs, the project was abandoned.
