= Castel Casoar =

1930s French glider

General information
- Type: Training glider
- National origin: France
- Manufacturer: Castel
- Number built: 1

History
- First flight: 1937

The Castel Casoar was a training glider built in the late 1930s in France. It was a glider of high-wing monoplane configuration.

== Specifications ==
Data from

General characteristics

- Crew: One
- Length: 8.00 m (26 ft 3 in)
- Wingspan: 18.60 m (61 ft 0 in)
- Height: 2.18 m (7 ft 2 in)
- Wing area: 20.60 m^{2} (221.7 sq ft)
- Aspect ratio: 23
- Empty weight: 216 kg (476 lb)
- Gross weight: 390 kg (860 lb)

Performance
