= Carmier-Arnoux Simplex =

1920s French aircraft

Simplex

General information
- National origin: France
- Manufacturer: Carmier-Arnoux
- Number built: 1

The Carmier-Arnoux Simplex was a tailless racing aircraft built in France in the early 1920s.

== Design ==
The Arnoux Simplex was a cantilever monoplane with full-span controllers. The fuselage ended with a vertical fin with a rudder, but no horizontal stabilizer. The pilot sat far back behind the wing's leading edge.

== Specifications (Simplex) ==
Data from

General characteristics

- Crew: One
- Length: 5.40 m (17 ft 9 in) including elevator
- Wingspan: 9.00 m (29 ft 6 in)
- Wing area: 14.00 m^{2} (150.7 sq ft)
- Empty weight: 800 kg (1,764 lb)
- Gross weight: 980 kg (2,161 lb)
- Powerplant: 1 × Hispano-Suiza 8Fb V-8 water-cooled piston engine, 240 kW (320 hp)
- Propellers: 2-bladed

Performance

- Maximum speed: 385 km/h (239 mph, 208 kn)

== Bibliography ==
- "Courrier des Lecteurs" [Readers' Letters]. Avions: Toute l'Aéronautique et son histoire (in French) (94): 4. January 2001. ISSN 1243-8650.
