= Gabardini Lictor =

Lictor

General information
- Type: Civil utility aircraft
- Manufacturer: Gabardini
- Number built: 2

History
- First flight: 1935

The Gabardini Lictor was a light aircraft developed in Italy in the mid-1930s. It was a low-wing cantilever monoplane with fixed, tailwheel undercarriage and a fully enclosed cabin. Two versions were built, the Lictor 90 with a 90 hp (67 kW) Fiat engine, and that Lictor 130 with a 130 hp (97 kW) Alfa Romeo 110, a de Havilland Gipsy Major engine built by Alfa Romeo. Development was abandoned in early 1936 when the firm was absorbed by Fiat.

== Specifications (Lictor 130) ==
General characteristics

- Crew: One pilot
- Capacity: 2-3 passengers
- Length: 8.15 m (26 ft 8 in)
- Wingspan: 11.40 m (37 ft 5 in)
- Wing area: 17.5 m^{2} (188 sq ft)
- Empty weight: 650 kg (1,433 lb)
- Gross weight: 1,000 kg (2,200 lb)
- Powerplant: 1 × Alfa Romeo 110 , 97 kW (130 hp)

Performance

- Maximum speed: 230 km/h (143 mph, 124 kn)
