= Caspar CLE 12 =

1920s German airliner

The Caspar CLE 12 was an airliner built in Germany in the early 1920s.

== Development ==
Only one CLE 12 was built, and it took part in the International Air Exhibition in Gothenburg (Sweden) in July 1923.

== Specifications ==
Data from

General characteristics

- Crew: One
- Capacity: 8 passengers
- Length: 11.25 m (36 ft 11 in)
- Wingspan: 20.00 m (65 ft 7 in)
- Height: 3.50 m (11 ft 6 in)
- Wing area: 53.40 m^{2} (574.8 sq ft)
- Empty weight: 1,750 kg (3,858 lb)
- Gross weight: 2,850 kg (6,283 lb)
- Powerplant: 1 × Maybach Mb IVa 6-cylinder water-cooled in-line piston engine, 190 kW (260 hp)
- Propellers: 2-bladed fixed pitch propeller

Performance

- Maximum speed: 160 km/h (99 mph, 86 kn)
- Cruise speed: 145 km/h (90 mph, 78 kn)
- Endurance: 4.20 hours
- Service ceiling: 4,000 m (13,000 ft)
