= Caspar CLE 16 =

Type of aircraft

The Caspar CLE 16 was an airliner built in Germany in the early 1920s.

== Development ==
Only one CLE 16 was built (registration D-294), and it took part in the International Air Exhibition in Gothenburg (Sweden) in July 1923.

== Specifications ==
Data from

General characteristics

- Crew: One
- Capacity: 3 passengers
- Length: 6.72 m (22 ft 1 in)
- Wingspan: 12.00 m (39 ft 4 in)
- Height: 2.20 m (7 ft 3 in)
- Wing area: 19.00 m^{2} (204.5 sq ft)
- Empty weight: 450 kg (992 lb)
- Gross weight: 830 kg (1,830 lb)
- Powerplant: 1 × Siemens-Halske Sh 5 7-cylinder air-cooled radial piston engine, 60 kW (80 hp)
- Propellers: 2-bladed fixed pitch propeller

Performance

- Maximum speed: 130 km/h (81 mph, 70 kn)
- Cruise speed: 105 km/h (65 mph, 57 kn)
- Range: 480 km (300 mi, 260 nmi)
- Endurance: 6 hours
- Service ceiling: 3,000 m (9,800 ft)
