= Caproni Ca.25 =

1910s Italian aircraft

General information
- Type: multipurpose aircraft
- Manufacturer: Caproni
- Designer: Giovanni Battista Caproni
- Number built: 1

History
- First flight: 1914

The Caproni Ca.25 was a single-engine monoplane made by the Italian company Aeronautica Caproni in 1914.

== Design ==
The Ca.25 was similar to the Caproni Ca.22 in being of high-wing parasol design, but differed in the installation of the autoresistance system.

Despite the very modest flight characteristics of a single copy of the aircraft was purchased by the military and was used for test flights.

== Specifications ==
Data from Gli aeroplani Caproni – Studi – Progetti – Realizzazioni 1908–1935, Aeroplani Caproni – Gianni Caproni ideatore e costruttore di ali italiane

General characteristics

- Crew: 1
- Length: 8.67 m (28 ft 5 in)
- Wingspan: 8.88 m (29 ft 2 in)
- Height: 3.29 m (10 ft 10 in)
- Wing area: 19.5 m^{2} (210 sq ft)
- Empty weight: 300 kg (661 lb)
- Powerplant: 1 × Anzani 6-cyl air-cooled radial piston engine , 30 kW (40 hp)
- Propellers: 2-bladed wooden fixed-pitch propeller

Performance

- Endurance: 5 hours
