= Caspar CLE 11 =

Type of aircraft

General information
- Type: Airliner
- National origin: Germany
- Manufacturer: Caspar-Werke

The Caspar CLE 11 was a cantilever-parasol monoplane cabin airliner built and flown in Germany in 1923.

== Development ==
One CLE 11 was built (registration D-294), and it took part in the International Air Exhibition in Gothenburg (Sweden) in July 1923.

== Specifications ==
Data from

General characteristics

- Crew: One
- Capacity: 2 passengers
- Length: 6.72 m (22 ft 1 in)
- Wingspan: 12.00 m (39 ft 4 in)
- Height: 2.20 m (7 ft 3 in)
- Wing area: 19.00 m^{2} (204.5 sq ft)
- Empty weight: 450 kg (992 lb)
- Gross weight: 830 kg (1,830 lb)
- Powerplant: 1 × Siemens-Halske Sh 5 5-cylinder air-cooled radial piston engine, 60 kW (80 hp)
- Propellers: 2-bladed fixed pitch propeller

Performance

- Maximum speed: 160 km/h (99 mph, 86 kn)
- Cruise speed: 145 km/h (90 mph, 78 kn)
- Range: 800 km (500 mi, 430 nmi)
- Endurance: 6 hours
- Service ceiling: 3,000 m (9,800 ft)
