= Caproni Ca.79 =

1920s Italian bomber aircraft

Ca.79
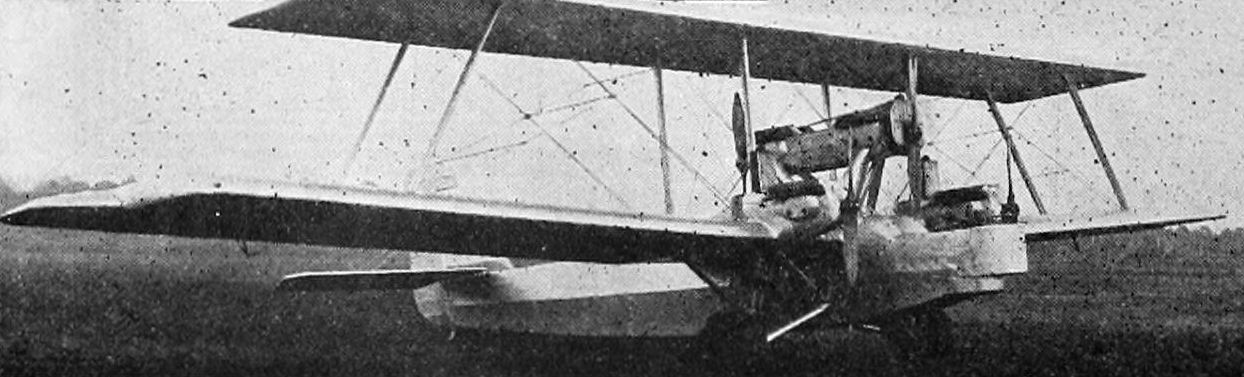

General information
- Type: Heavy bomber
- Manufacturer: Caproni
- Primary user: Regia Aeronautica

History
- Introduction date: 1927
- First flight: 1925

The Caproni Ca.79 was an Italian light bomber produced in the mid-1920s.

== Design ==
=== Wing ===
The wing structure consisted of two side members connected by joists and stiffened by cruises. The ribs were then inserted onto the side members. The ribs were very light and made of trellis, with duralumin insoles, steel tube uprights and adjustable steel wire crossbars.

=== Fuselage and armaments ===
At the center of the lower wing is the fuselage, made of steel tube. The lower side member is a lattice beam to which the carriages are anchored, the tie rods for stiffening the lower wing and the bombs. On the left side, two doors allowed access inside the fuselage: in the piloting position and at another place behind the wing. The two pilot seats were wide, at the top and in front of the front side member of the wing, separated by a short ladder. The controls are placed between the two pilots and on the ceiling of the fuselage. In the bow of the fuselage was located the turret for the machine gun and the place for the observer and its commands for the release of the bombs. Under the fuselage there was a second turret for the shot, which lowered with the weight of the machine gun (disappearing instead when it was not used). Aeroplani Caproni dal 1908 al 1935

=== Engine ===
Of the four engines, two were positioned in tandem, centrally to the cell above the fuselage, while each of the other two were positioned anteriorly, on the wings. The engines were started by compressed air, produced by a compressor unit located under the seat of the right hand rider.

== Operators ==
Kingdom of Italy

- Regia Aeronautica

== Specifications ==
Data from , Aeroplani Caproni dal 1908 al 1935

General characteristics

- Crew: 5
- Length: 16.4 m (53 ft 10 in)
- Wingspan: 33 m (108 ft 3 in)
- Height: 7 m (23 ft 0 in)
- Wing area: 220 m^{2} (2,400 sq ft)
- Empty weight: 6,500 kg (14,330 lb)
- Gross weight: 9,800 kg (21,605 lb)
- Max takeoff weight: 11,000 kg (24,251 lb)
- Powerplant: 4 × Isotta Fraschini Asso 500 V-12 water-cooledpiston engines, 370 kW (500 hp) each
- Propellers: 2-bladed fixed pitch pusher and tractor ptopellers

Performance

- Maximum speed: 220 km/h (140 mph, 120 kn)
- Cruise speed: 190 km/h (120 mph, 100 kn)
- Service ceiling: 5,500 m (18,000 ft)

Armament

- Guns: 3 × 7.7 mm (0.303 in) machine guns
- Bombs: 1,000 kg (2,200 lb) of bombs

== See also ==
Related lists

- List of Interwar military aircraft
