= Caspar C 30 =

Reconnaissance aircraft

C 30
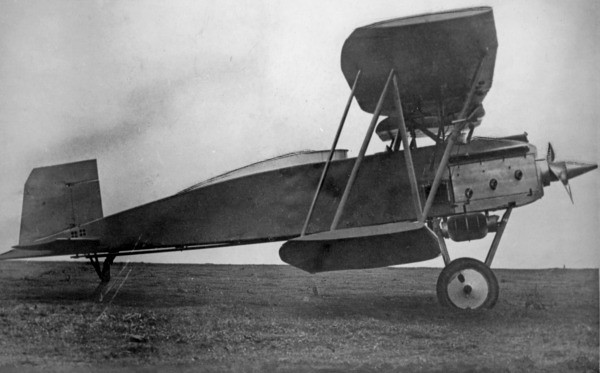

General information
- Type: Reconnaissance aircraft
- Manufacturer: Caspar-Werke
- Designer: Reinhold Mewes
- Number built: 1

History
- First flight: 1926

The Caspar C 30, a.k.a. Caspar LE 30 was an aerial reconnaissance aircraft developed in Germany and built in Denmark in the late 1920s.

== Design and development ==
It was a single-bay biplane with staggered, equal-span wings.

== Specifications ==
Data from

General characteristics

- Crew: 2
- Length: 9.1 m (29 ft 10 in)
- Wingspan: 10.8 m (35 ft 5 in)
- Empty weight: 1,200 kg (2,646 lb)
- Gross weight: 1,700 kg (3,748 lb)
- Powerplant: 1 × Hispano-Suiza 12Jb V-12 water-cooled piston engine, 280 kW (380 hp)
- Propellers: 2-bladed fixed pitch propeller

Performance

- Maximum speed: 240 km/h (150 mph, 130 kn)
- Cruise speed: 205 km/h (127 mph, 111 kn)
- Range: 1,000 km (620 mi, 540 nmi)
- Service ceiling: 7,000 m (23,000 ft)
