= Castel Yanapour II =

1930s French glider

General information
- Type: Primary Training Glider
- National origin: France
- Manufacturer: Dewoitine
- Designer: Robert Costello
- Number built: 1

History
- First flight: 1929

The Castel Yanapour II was a training glider built in the late 1929 in France. It was a glider of high-wing monoplane configuration. It was designed by Spanish-born French aeronautical engineer Robert Costello and manufactured by Constructions Aéronautiques Émile Dewoitine Only one plane was built, and it had its maiden journey in 1929, but due to new models being designed, it was dismantled.

== Specifications ==
Data from , J2mcL Planeurs: Castel Yanapour II

General characteristics

- Crew: 2
- Length: 8.02 m (26 ft 4 in)
- Wingspan: 12.48 m (40 ft 11 in)
- Height: 2.70 m (8 ft 10 in)
- Wing area: 24.00 m^{2} (258.3 sq ft)
- Aspect ratio: 6
- Airfoil: Göttingen 535 at 15% thickness
- Empty weight: 140 kg (309 lb)
- Gross weight: 270 kg (595 lb)

Performance
