= Castel C-31P =

1940s French glider

General information
- Type: Training glider
- National origin: France
- Manufacturer: Castel
- Number built: 63

History
- First flight: 1942

The Castel C-31P was a training glider built in the early 1940s in France. It was a glider of high-wing monoplane configuration.

== Specifications ==
Data from

General characteristics

- Crew: One
- Length: 6.20 m (20 ft 4 in)
- Wingspan: 14.00 m (45 ft 11 in)
- Height: 1.78 m (5 ft 10 in)
- Wing area: 13.63 m^{2} (146.7 sq ft)
- Aspect ratio: 18
- Empty weight: 140 kg (309 lb)
- Gross weight: 227 kg (500 lb)

Performance
