= Caspar U 2 =

1920s Japanese floatplane

U 2

General information
- Type: Reconnaissance aircraft
- Manufacturer: Caspar-Werke
- Designer: Reinhold Mewes
- Number built: 2

The Caspar U 2 was a recce floatplane built for Japan in the 1920s.

Two copies were constructed, and the aircraft formed the basis of the Yokosuka Navy Yokosho 1-go Reconnaissance Seaplane.

== Specifications ==
Data from

General characteristics

- Crew: One
- Length: 6.18 m (20 ft 3 in)
- Wingspan: 7.2 m (23 ft 7 in)
- Height: 2.59 m (8 ft 6 in)
- Wing area: 14 m^{2} (150 sq ft)
- Empty weight: 345 kg (761 lb)
- Gross weight: 510 kg (1,124 lb)
- Powerplant: 1 × Oberursel U.0 7-cylinder air-cooled rotary engine, 60 kW (80 hp)
- Propellers: 2-bladed

Performance

- Maximum speed: 150 km/h (93 mph, 81 kn)
- Cruise speed: 210 km/h (130 mph, 110 kn)
- Range: 250 km (160 mi, 130 nmi)
- Service ceiling: 3,000 m (9,800 ft)
- Time to altitude: 7 mins to 1,000 m (3,300 ft)

== Bibliography ==
- Passingham, Malcolm (February 2000). "Les hydravions embarqués sur sous-marins" [Submarine-carried Seaplanes]. Avions: Toute l'aéronautique et son histoire (in French) (83): 7–17. ISSN 1243-8650.
