= Caspar CT =

CT 1

General information
- Type: Sports plane
- Manufacturer: Caspar-Werke
- Designer: Reinhold Mewes
- Number built: 8

History
- First flight: 1923

The Caspar CT 1 was a sports aircraft developed in Germany in the early 1920s.

== Design and development ==
Only one CT 1 was built (civil registration D-662), and it took part in the 1925 Deutschen Rundflug.

== Variants ==
CT 1
(D-662), one built.
CT 2
(D-673, D-683, D-976) three built
CT 3
(D-617), one built for the 1925 Deutschen Rundflug.
CT 4
Two aircraft powered by Daimler D.II engines.
CT 5
Daimler D.I powered, one built by the end of 1925.

== Specifications (CT 2) ==
Data from

General characteristics

- Crew: 2
- Length: 7.00 m (23 ft 0 in)
- Wingspan: 11.50 m (37 ft 9 in)
- Height: 2.35 m (7 ft 9 in)
- Empty weight: 625 kg (1,378 lb)
- Gross weight: 860 kg (1,896 lb)
- Powerplant: 1 × Hirth HM 504A inline piston engine, 75 kW (100 hp)
- Propellers: 2-bladed fixed pitch propeller

Performance

- Maximum speed: 150 km/h (93 mph, 81 kn)
- Cruise speed: 135 km/h (84 mph, 73 kn)
- Service ceiling: 4,000 m (13,000 ft)
