= Caproni Ca.11 =

1910s Italian experimental aircraft

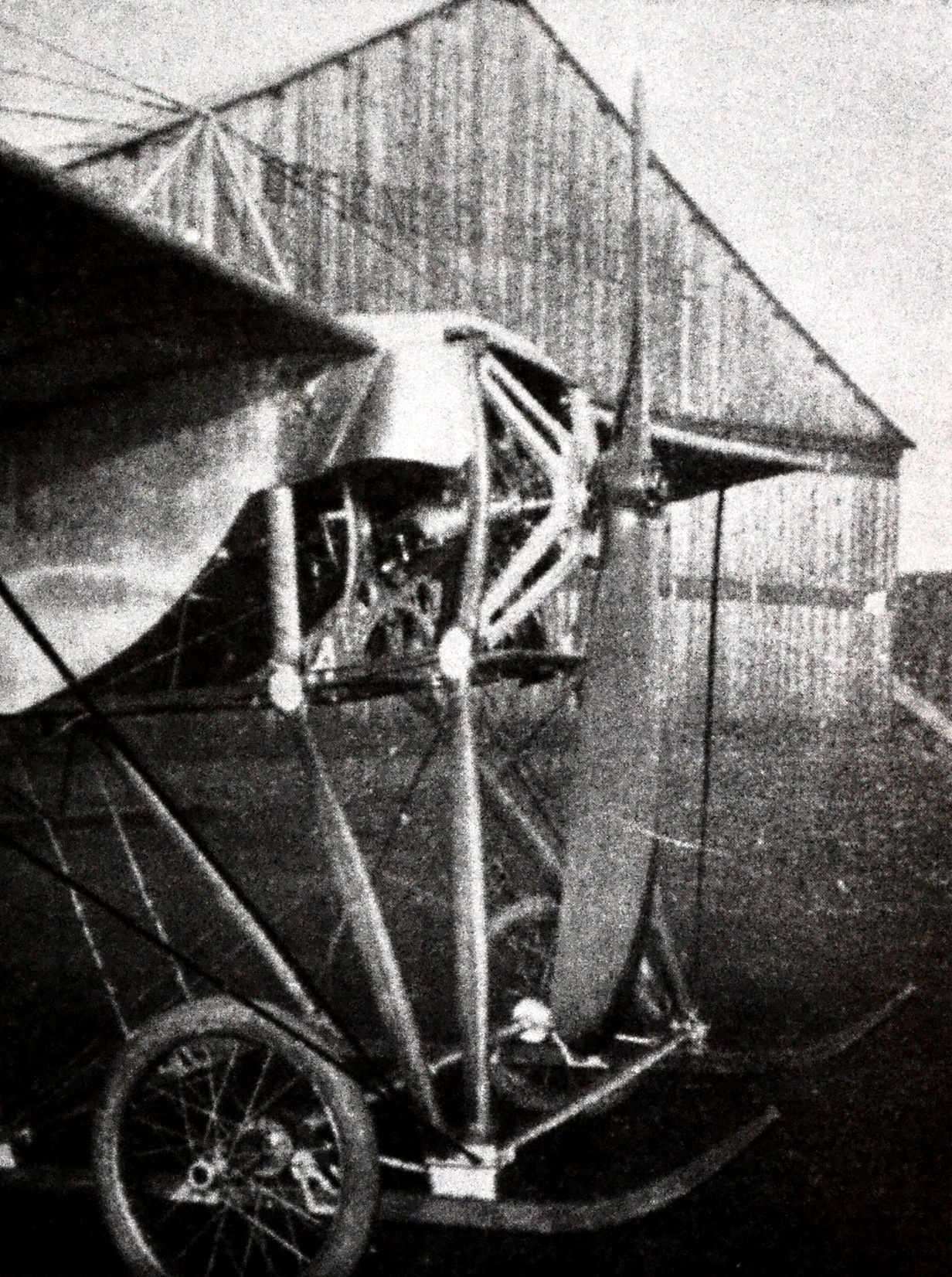

General information
- Type: Experimental aircraft
- Manufacturer: Caproni
- Status: Retired
- Number built: 1

History
- First flight: 1911

The Caproni Ca.11 was a single-engine monoplane designed and built by Caproni in the early 1910s.

== Design ==
The Caproni Ca.11 was a high wing monoplane with a wooden structure and a canvas covering, equipped with a wing warping system to control the roll and reinforced by metal tie rods connected to the fuselage and to a special structure placed above it; the fuselage was based on a wooden lattice structure, in turn reinforced by metal cables, and was covered in cloth only for the front half; the same wooden structure with a canvas covering characterized the empennages. The trolley, fixed, was composed of two front wheels with anti-overblank pads and another smaller, tailed shoe. The Ca.11 differed from its immediate predecessors mainly for the engine, a French -made 7- cylinder star- shaped Gnome capable of developing a power of 50 hp.

== Operational use ==
The Ca.11 was a single-seater designed for training and for experimental military applications. The quality of the project and the construction, however, allowed the model to report several notable successes, with a series of speed records beaten in February 1912.

On 12 February, under the control of the pilot Enrico Cobioni, who had obtained his own flight license at the Caproni aviation school in Vizzola Ticino, a Ca.11 traveled 20 times, turning around in a circle, a closed circuit of 5 km, for a total of 100 km, in 66 min 30 s, thus establishing a new Italian record for the 100 km circuit (average speed of 90.225 km / h ) [4] for the 5 km in circuit (average speed of 91.370 km / h, corresponding to a time of 3 min 17 s); the record was approved by the commissioners Augusto Vogel and Gustavo Moreno.

On 14 February the same pilot beat the Italian supremacy, rising to 1,150 m (moreover in a very short time of 15 minutes); during the same flight Cobioni covered 1,582 m in 53 s, touching a speed of 106.242 km / h and thus beating the national record straight.

== Specifications ==
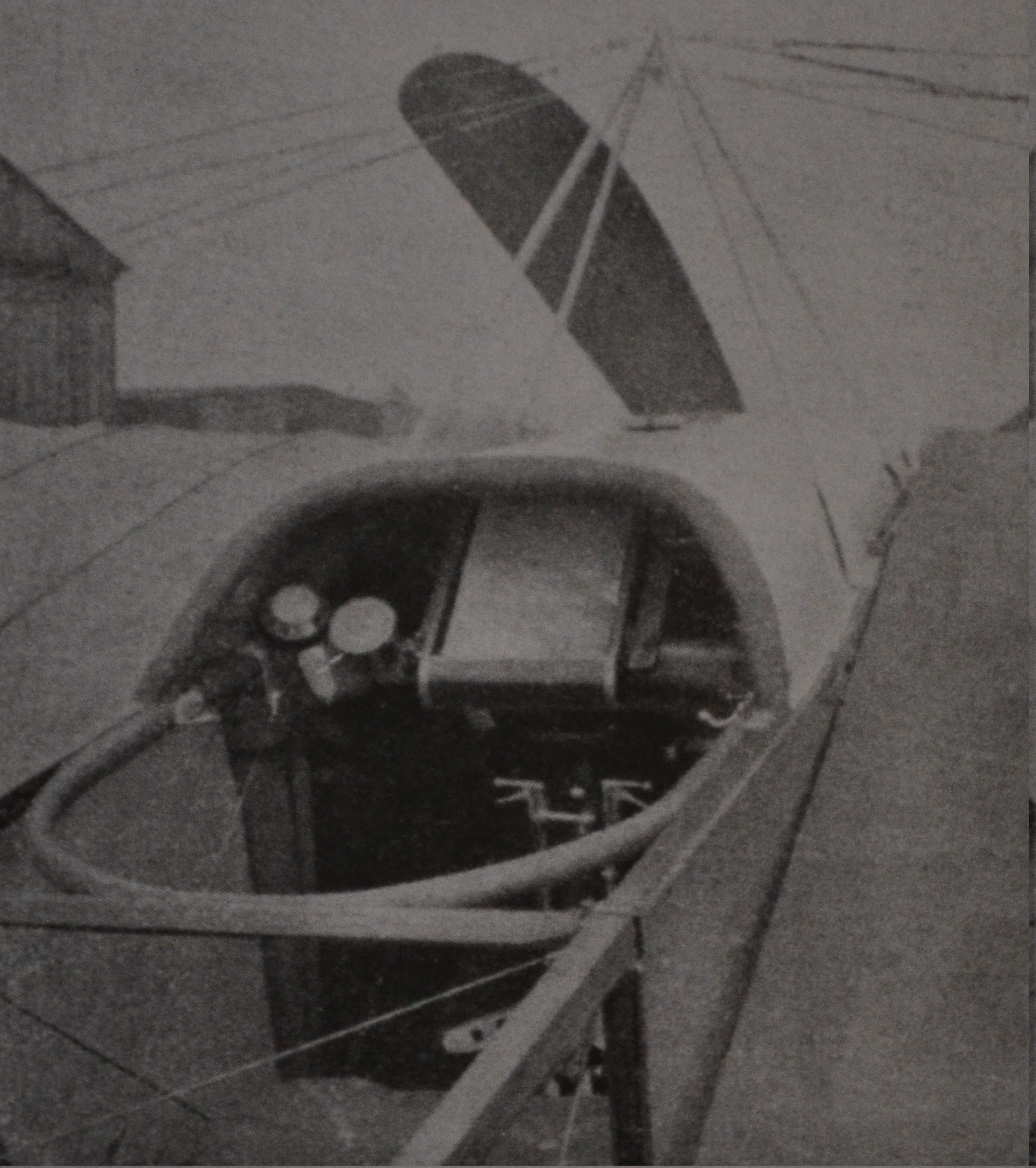
Ca.11 cockpit

Data from Gli aeroplani Caproni – Studi – Progetti – Realizzazioni 1908-1935, Aeroplani Caproni – Gianni Caproni ideatore e costruttore di ali italiane

General characteristics

- Crew: 1
- Length: 8.4 m (27 ft 7 in)
- Wingspan: 8.88 m (29 ft 2 in)
- Wing area: 16 m^{2} (170 sq ft)
- Empty weight: 240 kg (529 lb)
- Gross weight: 405 kg (893 lb)
- Powerplant: 1 × Gnome Omega 7-cylinder air-cooled rotary piston engine, 37 kW (50 hp)
- Propellers: 2-bladed wooden fixed-pitch propeller

Performance

- Maximum speed: 106 km/h (66 mph, 57 kn)

== See also ==
- Giovanni Battista Caproni
- Museo dell'Aeronautica Gianni Caproni
