= Caproni Ca.95 =

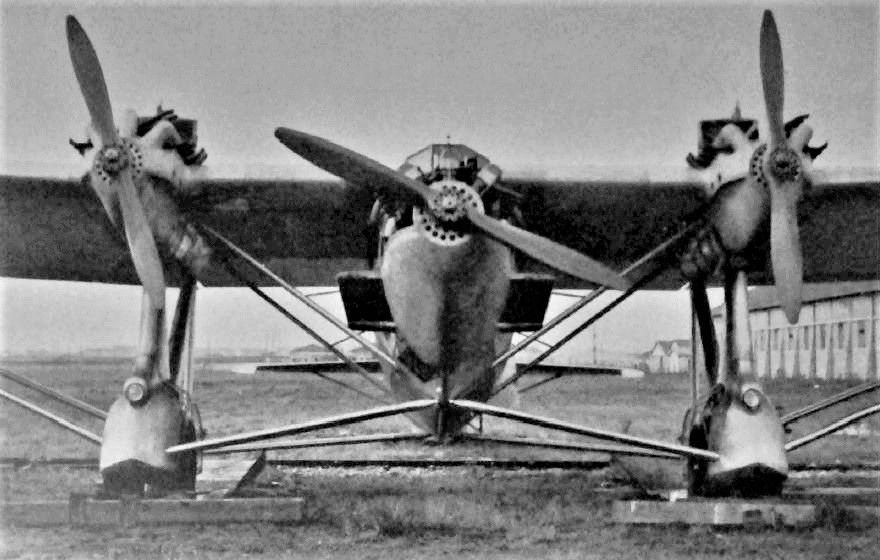

General information
- Type: Heavy bomber
- National origin: Italy
- Manufacturer: Società Italiana Caproni
- Number built: 1

History
- First flight: late 1929 - early 1930

The Caproni Ca.95 was a large, three engine, long range, heavy bomber prototype built in Italy in 1929. It could carry a 1,600 kg (3,500 lb) bomb load and had three defensive gun positions. Only one was built.

== Design and development ==
The three-engined Caproni 95 was a high wing monoplane with fixed landing gear, steel tube framed throughout, but almost entirely fabric covered. The large span wing was in three parts, with two outer panels mounted with 3.8° of dihedral to a central section which reached as far as the outer engines and the undercarriage legs. It was built around two square section steel beam spars and in plan was rectangular except close to the bevelled tips where there was straight taper. High aspect ratio ailerons occupied most of the trailing edge.

=== Fuselage ===
The Caproni's fuselage was formed internally by three longerons but the exterior was octagonal in cross section. The pilots' enclosed cabin, fitted with side-by-side seating and dual control, was at the wing leading edge and above the mechanic's position. They communicated via a hatch. The bomb-bay was behind the mechanic, under the wing, the bombs oriented according to weight. The largest, two 800 kg (1,800 lb) or four 400 kg (880 lb) bombs were held horizontally in parallel pairs but smaller bombs were arranged vertically, again in two rows. The fourth crew-member was the navigator and radio operator, seated at mid-fuselage, though he became the gunner when required. There were two mid-fuselage machine gun positions, one dorsal (though the early drawing shows it just aft of the cockpit) and one ventral in retractable turrets, with a third, in a rotatable position in the extreme tail, under the rudder. An internal duralumin walled tunnel gave access between the rear cabin and the guns.

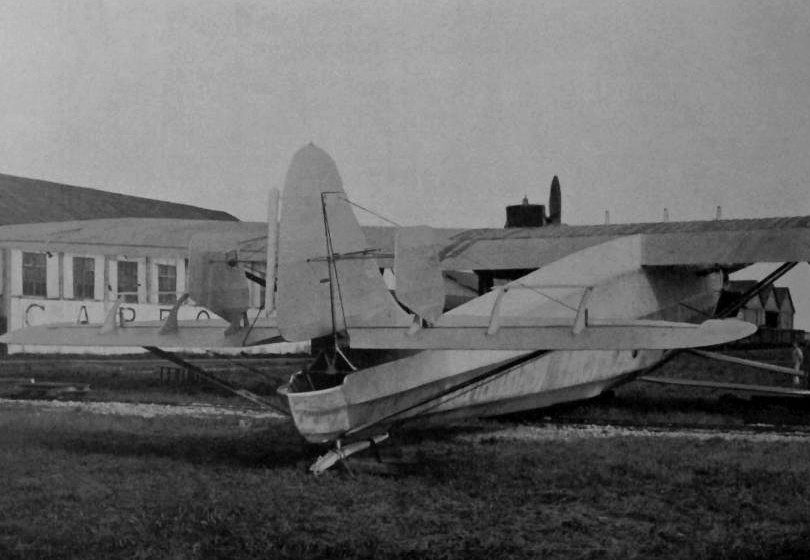

=== Flying controls ===
The rudder was hinged to a triangular fin which also mounted, low down, a triangular tailplane braced by diverging pairs of struts on each side to the lower fuselage. Originally both elevators and the rudder were horn balanced but before 1933 these integrated balances had external assistance to ease the control loads of this large and heavy aircraft: the elevators were fitted with upper surface spades and the rudder had a pair of servo surfaces close to it.(image, right)

=== Engines ===
The Caproni 95 was powered by three 1,000 hp (750 kW) water-cooled W-18 Isotta Fraschini Asso 1000 engines, one in the nose and the other two at the ends of the wing centre-section. The outer two had rectangular radiators raised behind them and the central one had a pair of flat, edge-on radiators at mid-fuselage height.(lower image)

=== Undercarriage ===
The Caproni was a heavy aircraft and needed a sturdy undercarriage. On each side it had a pair of mainwheels with 1,350 mm (53 in) diameter tyres on axles joined to a strong frame via short oleo struts. The frame, enclosed with the wheels under fairings, was mounted from the wings under the outer engine by a faired N-strut, of which the forward member was the chief leg. Another pair of struts, almost horizontal, joined the undercarriage frame to the lower fuselage. At the rear the 480 mm (19 in) diameter tailwheel was also oleo sprung and damped; it castored through ±90°.

The undercarriage structure was also central to the wing bracing. The Caproni 95's long wing was not a cantilever but braced by a pair of parallel struts from the wing spars just beyond mid-span to the wheel frames. These struts had further, short jury struts from near their tops at 90° to the spars. There was also a pair of struts from the lower fuselage to the wing, joining the vertical undercarriage legs under the engines.

== Operational history ==
The exact date of the first flight of the Caproni 95 is uncertain but the publication of an Air Ministry handbook for it in May 1930 suggests it was flying by then. It served with the Regia Aeronautica in an experimental aircraft squadron until 1934.

== Specifications ==
Data from l'Aérophile April 1933, p.117

General characteristics

- Crew: Four
- Length: 21.90 m (71 ft 10 in)
- Wingspan: 41.43 m (135 ft 11 in)
- Height: 5.35 m (17 ft 7 in)
- Wing area: 23.4 m^{2} (252 sq ft)
- Empty weight: 7,500 kg (16,535 lb) weights from
- Gross weight: 15,000 kg (33,069 lb)
- Fuel capacity: 6,000 L (1,300 imp gal; 1,600 US gal)
- Powerplant: 3 × Isotta Fraschini Asso 1000 water-cooled W-18, 750 kW (1,000 hp) each
- Propellers: 2-bladed

Performance

- Maximum speed: 250 km/h (160 mph, 130 kn)
- Cruise speed: 210 km/h (130 mph, 110 kn)
- Minimum control speed: 90 km/h (56 mph, 49 kn)
- Range: 3,000 km (1,900 mi, 1,600 nmi)
- Service ceiling: 5,000 m (16,000 ft)

Armament

- Guns: 1 machine gun in each of dorsal, ventral (both retractable) and tail turrets.
- Bombs: 2 × 800 kg (1,800 lb) or the same total weight of smaller bombs
