= Castel C-310P =

1940s French glider

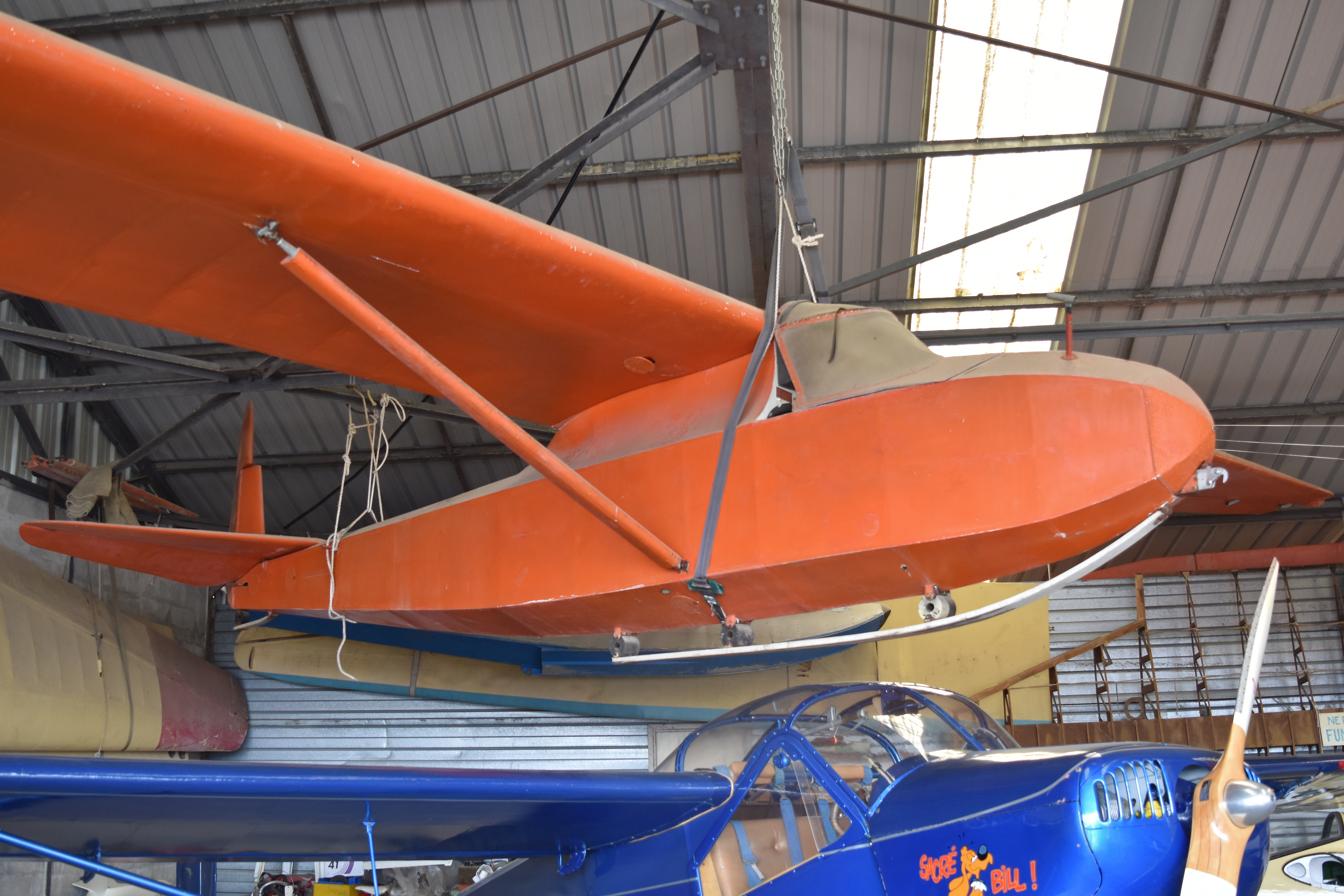
- Castel C-310P ‘F-CRGU’ (c/n 156), seen suspended in one of the many private hangars at the Aérodrome de Cerny-La-Ferté-Alais, Cerny, France.

General information
- Type: Training glider
- National origin: France
- Manufacturer: Castel
- Number built: 60

History
- First flight: 1942

The Castel C-310P was a training glider built in the late 1940s in France. It was a glider of high-wing monoplane configuration.

== Specifications ==
Data from

General characteristics

- Crew: One
- Length: 6.20 m (20 ft 4 in)
- Wingspan: 14.00 m (45 ft 11 in)
- Height: 1.78 m (5 ft 10 in)
- Wing area: 14.73 m^{2} (158.6 sq ft)
- Aspect ratio: 2
- Empty weight: 157 kg (346 lb)
- Gross weight: 244 kg (538 lb)

Performance
