= Carpenter Special =

Homebuilt 1933 biplane

General information
- Type: Homebuilt aircraft
- National origin: United States
- Designer: Wilbur Staib
- Number built: 1

History
- First flight: 1933

The Carpenter Special, also called Little Dea Dea, is an early homebuilt biplane design.

== Design and development ==
The Carpenter Special was a custom homebuilt design from Wilbur Staib, built for M. Carpenter in Joplin, Missouri in 1933.

The Carpenter Special is an open cockpit biplane with conventional landing gear. The fuselage is made of welded steel tube and the wings use wooden spars and wing ribs, all with fabric covering. The aircraft was built with a Continental A-50 powerplant, but was re-engined in 1949 with a 125 hp (93 kW) Warner Scarab, then with a Continental C-85 engine of 85 hp (63 kW).

== Specifications (Carpenter Special) ==
Data from Experimenter

General characteristics

- Crew: 1
- Length: 19 ft 6 in (5.94 m)
- Upper wingspan: 21 ft (6.4 m)
- Lower wingspan: 19 ft 9 in (6.02 m)
- Height: 7 ft 10 in (2.39 m)
- Airfoil: Clark Y
- Fuel capacity: 24 US gal (91 L; 20 imp gal)
- Powerplant: 1 × Continental C85-12 horizontally-opposed piston aircraft engine, 85 hp (63 kW)
- Propellers: 2-bladed

Performance

- Maximum speed: 96 kn (110 mph, 180 km/h)
- Cruise speed: 87 kn (100 mph, 160 km/h)
- Stall speed: 56 kn (65 mph, 105 km/h)
- Range: 282 nmi (324 mi, 521 km)
