= Caproni Ca.125 =

Ca.125
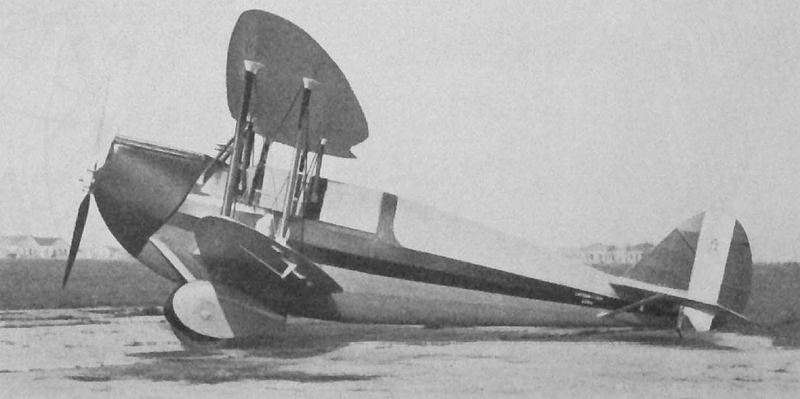

General information
- Type: Two tandem-seat touring biplane
- National origin: Italy
- Manufacturer: Società Italiana Caproni
- Number built: c.2

History
- First flight: 1933

The Caproni Ca.125 was a single-engine, tandem two-seat, touring biplane built in Italy in 1933. It could be operated either as a landplane or seaplane.

== Design and development ==
The Ca.125 was a wire braced single bay biplane with slender, elliptical, unequal span wings; pairs of parallel interplane struts defined the bays and, because the lower wings had the greater span, these struts leaned inwards. The wings had neither stagger nor sweep. Ailerons were fitted only on the lower planes. In contrast to the elegant wing plan, the fuselage was deep and portly, in part a consequence of the enclosed, tandem cockpits. Since the canopies' rooflines followed that of the upper fuselage, the crew sat low down, with poor forward views. The forward view was also hindered by the six-cylinder upright engine, which had to be placed high in the nose to properly locate the thrust line. As a result, the top of the cowling was at the same height as that of the windscreen; there was only a small gap between the screen and the rear of the engine. Cabane struts joined the wing centre section to the fuselage over the forward cockpit; a shallow trailing edge cutout somewhat improved upward visibility from the rear seat.

The Ca.125's fuselage was rounded in cross-section and tapered gradually to the tail. The tail surfaces were conventional, with the tailplane mounted on top of the fuselage and braced to the lower longerons. The elevators were separate so that the rounded rudder could extend to the base of the fuselage and move between them. The fin was almost triangular. The fixed undercarriage was conventional, with mainwheels in spats mounted on V-form struts fixed to the fuselage sides just forward of the wing leading edge. Half-axles joined the wheels to the central fuselage underside. A Ca.125 idro version was also flown, its wheels replaced by a pair of duralumin floats, attached by struts to the lower fuselage

== Variants ==
Ca.125
landplane
Ca.125 idro
floatplane

== Specifications (landplane) ==
Data from Gli Aeroplani Caproni (1935),

General characteristics

- Capacity: two
- Length: 7.25 m (23 ft 9 in)
- Wingspan: 8.85 m (29 ft 0 in)
- Height: 2.25 m (7 ft 5 in)
- Wing area: 19.0 m^{2} (205 sq ft)
- Empty weight: 545 kg (1,202 lb)
- Max takeoff weight: 815 kg (1,797 lb)
- Fuel capacity: 120L (31.7 USgal;26.4 Impgal)
- Powerplant: 1 × Colombo S.63 six-cylinder air-cooled upright inline, 101 kW (135 hp)
- Propellers: 2-bladed

Performance

- Maximum speed: 220 km/h (140 mph, 120 kn)
- Stall speed: 80 km/h (50 mph, 43 kn)
- Range: 900 km (560 mi, 490 nmi)
- Service ceiling: 5,500 m (18,000 ft)
