= Caproni Ca.146 =

1930s Italian aircraft

Ca.146

General information
- Type: Reconnaissance
- Manufacturer: Caproni
- Status: prototype only
- Number built: 1

History
- First flight: 1935

The Caproni Ca.146 was a high-wing reconnaissance aircraft built by Caproni in the mid-1930s.

== Design ==
The Ca.146 was a derivative of the Ca.127, and was similar in being a high-wing monoplane. However, the Ca.146 was of all-wood construction and had no armament provisions. The Ca.146 prototype (registration MM.131) flew in 1935 and showed good flight characteristics, but won no orders from the Regia Aeronautica.

== Specifications ==
Data from

General characteristics

- Crew: Two
- Length: 9.54 m (31 ft 4 in)
- Wingspan: 12.60 m (41 ft 4 in)
- Wing area: 23 m^{2} (250 sq ft)
- Empty weight: 1,950 kg (4,299 lb)
- Gross weight: 3,305 kg (7,286 lb)
- Powerplant: 1 × Isotta Fraschini Asso XI R.C.40 V-12 water-cooled piston engine, 630 kW (840 hp)
- Propellers: 2-bladed fixed pitch wooden propeller or 3-bladedground-adjustable metal propeller

Performance

- Maximum speed: 420 km/h (260 mph, 230 kn)
- Cruise speed: 380 km/h (240 mph, 210 kn)
- Range: 1,000 km (620 mi, 540 nmi)
- Service ceiling: 8,000 m (26,000 ft)
