= CAG Toxo =

Toxo
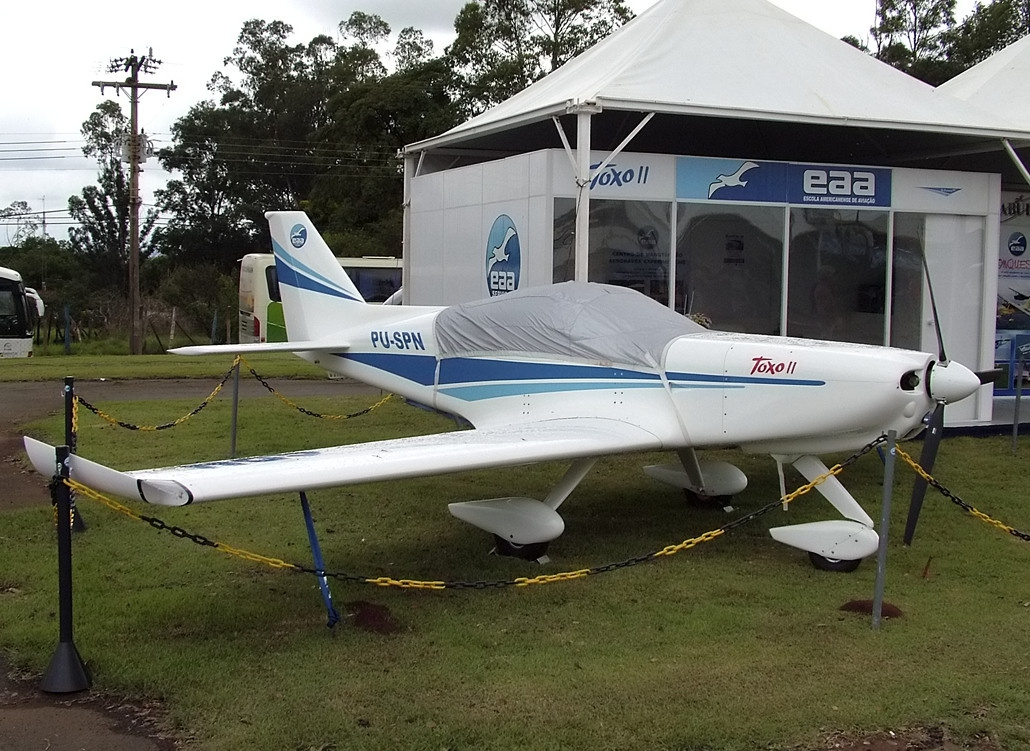

General information
- Type: Two-seat light homebuilt cabin monoplane
- National origin: Spain
- Manufacturer: Construcciones Aeronauticas de Galicia

History
- First flight: 1999

The CAG Toxo is a Spanish two-seat ultralight cabin monoplane designed and built by Construcciones Aeronauticas de Galicia for amateur construction.

== Design and development ==
The prototype Toxo ultralight first flew in 1999 and was a low-wing cantilever monoplane with fixed tricycle landing gear. The Toxo can be powered typically by a 120 hp (89 kW) Jabiru 3300 or a Rotax 914S engine. The cabin has two seats side-by-side with dual controls, each with a centerline-hinged upward-opening door.

== Variants ==
Toxo
Variant approved as an ultralight

Toxo II
Variant approved in the VLA category.

== Specifications (Toxo ultralight) ==
Data from Jane's All the World's Aircraft 2004-2005

General characteristics

- Crew: two
- Length: 5.40 m (17 ft 8.5 in)
- Wingspan: 7.96 m (26 ft 1.5 in)
- Height: 2.00 m (6 ft 6.75 in)
- Wing area: 8.70 m^{2} (93.65 sq ft)
- Empty weight: 280 kg (617 lb)
- Gross weight: 472 kg (1,041 lb)
- Powerplant: 1 × Jabiru 2200 , 64 kW (85 hp)

Performance

- Maximum speed: 400 km/h (249 mph, 216 kn)
- Cruise speed: 240 km/h (149 mph, 129 kn)
- Stall speed: 64 km/h (40 mph, 35 kn)
- g limits: +6/-4
- Rate of climb: 5.1 m/s (1,000 ft/min)
