= Calipt'Air =

Aircraft manufacturer based in Spiez, Switzerland

Calipt'Air AG
- Company type: Aktiengesellschaft
- Industry: Aerospace
- Founded: December 1997
- Defunct: 2005
- Fate: Out of business
- Headquarters: Spiez, Switzerland
- Products: Paragliders

Calipt'Air AG was a Swiss aircraft manufacturer based in Spiez. The company specialized in the design and manufacture of paragliders and also produced a line of emergency parachutes.

The company name comes from Ancient Greek. Kalos means beautiful and pteryx means wing.

The company was founded in December 1997 and went out of business in 2005. A memorial website for the company was created in 2009, but was later taken down from the internet.

Calipt'Air was an Aktiengesellschaft, a corporation limited by share ownership.

The company produced a range of paragliders, including the Calipt'Air Serenis intermediate glider, the Calipt'Air Vectis performance intermediate and competition wing and the Calipt'Air Walabis Bi for the tandem flight training role. It also made the SOS line of emergencies parachutes.

== Aircraft ==
Summary of aircraft built by Calipt'Air:

- Calipt'Air Serenis
- Calipt'Air V-56
- Calipt'Air Vectis
- Calipt'Air Walabis Bi
