= Caldas 2G7 Vento =

Colombian ultralight aircraft

2G7 Vento
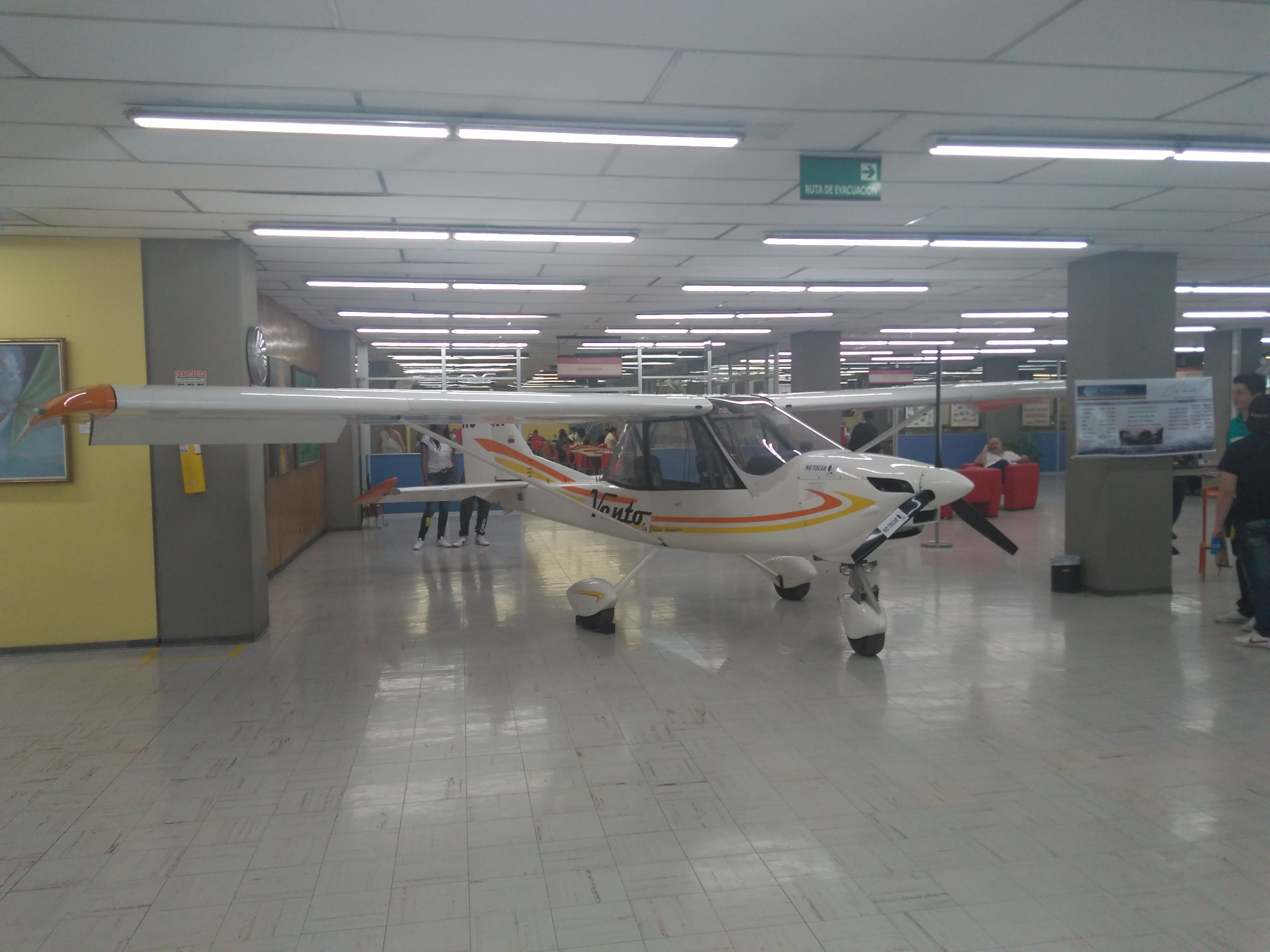

General information
- Type: Ultralight aircraft
- National origin: Colombia
- Manufacturer: Caldas Aeronautica
- Status: Production completed (2015)

History
- Manufactured: 2010-2015

The Caldas 2G7 Vento (English: Wind) is a Colombian ultralight aircraft that was designed and produced by Caldas Aeronautica of Cali, introduced in about 2010. The company seems to be out of business and the aircraft production completed.

== Design and development ==
The aircraft features a strut-braced high-wing, an enclosed cabin with two-seats-in-tandem accessed by flip-up doors, fixed tricycle landing gear and a single engine in tractor configuration.

The aircraft was designed for recreational, flight training and agricultural aircraft uses. Its 9.8 m (32.2 ft) span wing has an area of 12.32 m^{2} (132.6 sq ft) and flaps. The standard engine fitted is the 80 hp (60 kW) Rotax 912UL powerplant.

== Specifications (2G7 Vento) ==
Data from Tacke

General characteristics

- Crew: one
- Capacity: one passenger
- Wingspan: 9.8 m (32 ft 2 in)
- Wing area: 12.32 m^{2} (132.6 sq ft)
- Empty weight: 260 kg (573 lb)
- Gross weight: 590 kg (1,301 lb)
- Powerplant: 1 × Rotax 912UL four cylinder, liquid and air-cooled, four stroke aircraft engine, 60 kW (80 hp)
- Propellers: 3-bladed composite
