= Caproni Ca.225 =

1930s Italian aircraft

General information
- Type: Attack bomber
- Manufacturer: Caproni
- Primary user: Regia Aeronautica

History
- First flight: November 1935

The Caproni Ca.225 was a twin-engine attack bomber design proposed by Caproni in the mid-1930s.

== Specifications ==
Data from Italian Civil and Military Aircraft 1930–1945

General characteristics

- Crew: 2
- Length: 13.2502 m (43 ft 5.66 in)
- Wingspan: 14.7996 m (48 ft 6.66 in)
- Height: 4 m (13 ft 1 in)
- Wing area: 65 m^{2} (700 sq ft)
- Gross weight: 5,697 kg (12,560 lb)
- Powerplant: 2 × Isotta Fraschini Zeta R.C.42 X-24 air-cooled piston engines, 930 kW (1,250 hp) each
- Powerplant: 2 × metal propellers

Performance

- Maximum speed: 636 km/h (395 mph, 343 kn)

Armament

- Guns: 4 x 20 mm (0.787 in) cannon; 2 × 12.7 mm (0.500 in) machine guns

== See also ==
Related lists

- List of bomber aircraft
- List of Interwar military aircraft
