= Caproni Ca.122 =

Ca.122
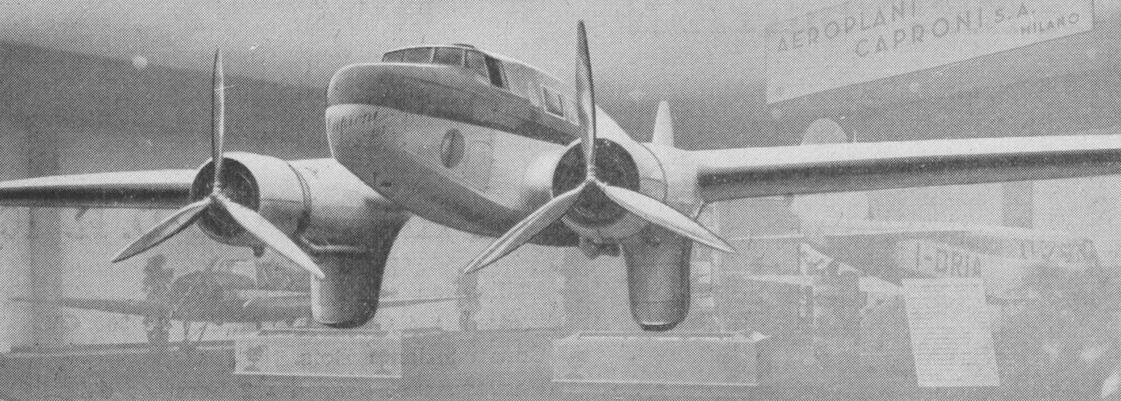
- Caproni Ca.123

General information
- Type: Bomber and military transport
- Manufacturer: Caproni
- Status: Prototypes only

The Caproni Ca.122 was a prototype bomber and military transport aircraft built in Italy in the mid-1930s. It was a conventional low-wing monoplane with fixed undercarriage. Power was provided by twin Gnome-Rhône 14K radial engines. No production ensued for either this or the 28-seat airliner version designated Ca.123.

== Specifications (Ca.123) ==
General characteristics

- Crew: three: pilot, co-pilot, and radio operator
- Capacity: 28 passengers
- Length: 18.19 m (59 ft 8 in)
- Wingspan: 27.87 m (91 ft 5 in)
- Height: 6.00 m (19 ft 8 in)
- Wing area: 91.6 m^{2} (986 sq ft)
- Empty weight: 5,300 kg (11,686 lb)
- Gross weight: 8,800 kg (19,404 lb)
- Powerplant: 2 × Gnome-Rhône 14K , 650 kW (870 hp) each

Performance

- Maximum speed: 340 km/h (211 mph, 183 kn)
- Range: 1,500 km (932 mi, 810 nmi)
- Service ceiling: 7,530 m (27,400 ft)
- Rate of climb: 0.10 m/s (13 ft/min)
