= Caproni Ca.134 =

1930s Italian reconnaissance aircraft

Ca.134
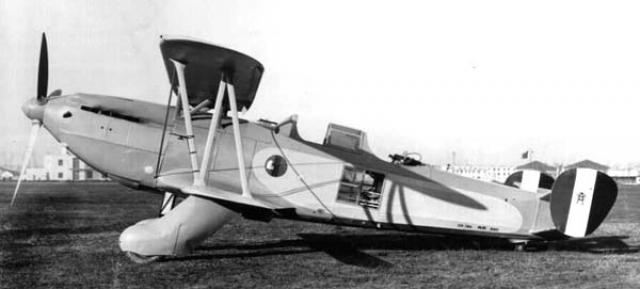

General information
- Type: Reconnaissance aircraft
- Manufacturer: Caproni
- Designer: Rodolfo Verduzio
- Status: prototype only
- Primary user: Regia Aeronautica
- Number built: 2

History
- First flight: 23 January 1937

The Caproni Ca.134 was a biplane reconnaissance aircraft built by the Italian company Caproni in the 1930s.

== Design ==
The Ca.134 was a two-seat, single-biplane fixed-cart aircraft with a typical appearance. The fuselage, made of a metal structure covered with panels that were also metal, incorporated the two tandem cabins with windshield, the front for the pilot and the rear of the observer, the latter equipped with side windows to facilitate the location targets and a defensive brandable machine gun. Laterally it continued in a tail characterized by the biplane bi-fletching drift with double control planes from the accentuated positive dihedral angle.

The wing configuration was inverted biplane-sesquiplane, with the upper wing opening lower than the one mounted low on the fuselage. The two wings were connected to each other by an N-shaped mullion on each side integrated with steel wire tie -rods, with the upper connected to the fuselage by a central tubular castle. The landing gear was a simple two- wheeled cycle with shock-absorbed power legs fitted with a "trouser" fairing, integrated at the back by a small wheel. The propulsion was entrusted to an Isotta Fraschini Asso XI RC.40 engine positioned at the front apex of the fuselage, a liquid-cooled 12-cylinder V engine capable of delivering a power output of 900 hp (662 kW ), covered by a metal casing and combined with a triple helix.

The armament consisted of a pair of Breda-SAFAT machine guns of different caliber, the heaviest 12.7 mm mounted on the hunt and the lighter 7.7 mm mounted on a tilting support and positioned in the rear passenger compartment.

== Development ==
In 1936 the Ministry of Aeronautics issued a specification for the supply of a new terrestrial strategic reconnaissance aircraft. The Caproni also participated in the competition announcement with a design assigned to the designation Ca.134. The Ca.134 was evaluated in Guidonia on January 23, 1937, by the commission examining the Regia Aeronautica but did not get any commission. There is no certain information about the use that was made but it appears to have been permanently put on the ground on 11 May 1939, radiated by age.

== Specifications ==
Data from

General characteristics

- Crew: 2
- Length: 9.6 m (31 ft 6 in)
- Wingspan: 12.32 m (40 ft 5 in)
- Height: 3.4 m (11 ft 2 in)
- Wing area: 32.6 m^{2} (351 sq ft)
- Empty weight: 1,620 kg (3,571 lb)
- Gross weight: 2,380 kg (5,247 lb)
- Powerplant: 1 × Isotta Fraschini Asso XI R.C.40 V-12 liquid-cooled piston engine, 670 kW (900 hp)

Performance

- Maximum speed: 486 km/h (302 mph, 262 kn)
- Cruise speed: 424 km/h (263 mph, 229 kn)
- Range: 1,800 km (1,100 mi, 970 nmi)
- Service ceiling: 7,800 m (25,600 ft)

Armament

- Guns:

1 × 12.7 mm (0.500 in) fixed forward firing synchronised machine gun
1 × 7.7 mm (0.303 in) machine gun in a dorsal turret
