= Caproni Ca.10 =

1910s Italian experimental aircraft

General information
- Type: Experimental aircraft
- Manufacturer: Caproni
- Designer: Giovanni Battista Caproni
- Status: Retired
- Number built: 1

History
- First flight: 1911

The Caproni Ca.10 was a single-engine monoplane designed and built by Caproni in the early 1910s.

== Design ==
The Caproni Ca.10 was a single-engine monoplane of conventional configuration with tailskid undercarriage and cruciform tail unit, similar to the Caproni Ca.9 from which it was derived, differentiated by having a two-seats instead of one. The second seat for the passenger was placed below the cabane pyramid, forward of the pilot's seat.

== Specifications ==
Data from Gli aeroplani Caproni – Studi – Progetti – Realizzazioni 1908-1935, Aeroplani Caproni – Gianni Caproni ideatore e costruttore di ali italiane

General characteristics

- Crew: 2
- Length: 8.4 m (27 ft 7 in)
- Wingspan: 8.88 m (29 ft 2 in)
- Height: 2.65 m (8 ft 8 in)
- Wing area: 16 m^{2} (170 sq ft)
- Empty weight: 220 kg (485 lb)
- Gross weight: 385 kg (849 lb)
- Powerplant: 1 × Anzani 3-cyl air-cooled radial piston engine , 26 kW (35 hp)
- Propellers: 2-bladed wooden fixed-pitch propeller

Performance

- Maximum speed: 90 km/h (56 mph, 49 kn)

== See also ==
- Giovanni Battista Caproni
- Museo dell'Aeronautica Gianni Caproni
