= Castel C-311P =

1950s French glider

General information
- Type: Training glider
- National origin: France
- Manufacturer: Castel
- Number built: 45

History
- First flight: 1950

The Castel C-311P was a training glider built in the early 1950s in France. It was a glider of high-wing monoplane configuration.

== Specifications ==
Data from

General characteristics

- Crew: One
- Length: 6.60 m (21 ft 8 in)
- Wingspan: 14.00 m (45 ft 11 in)
- Height: 2.10 m (6 ft 11 in)
- Wing area: 14.73 m^{2} (158.6 sq ft)
- Aspect ratio: 25
- Empty weight: 167 kg (368 lb)
- Gross weight: 254 kg (560 lb)

Performance
