= CANSA C.6 =

C.6 Falchetto

General information
- Type: Military trainer
- Manufacturer: CANSA
- Designer: Giacomo Mosso and Isidoro Martignago
- Number built: 2

History
- First flight: 30 June 1941

The CANSA C.6 was a training biplane developed in Italy during World War II. It was intended as an aerobatic intermediate trainer for the Regia Aeronautica and was of conventional tailskid configuration with a single-bay wing cellule with swept outer panels. Two prototypes were constructed, the single-seat C.6 and the two-seat C.6B, but no production order ensued.

== Specifications (C.6B) ==
Data from Dimensione Cielo

General characteristics

- Crew: Two, pilot and instructor
- Length: 7.83 m (25 ft 8 in)
- Wingspan: 8.65 m (28 ft 5 in)
- Height: 3.10 m (10 ft 2 in)
- Wing area: 21.67 m^{2} (233.3 sq ft)
- Empty weight: 930 kg (2,050 lb)
- Gross weight: 1,255 kg (2,767 lb)
- Powerplant: 1 × Isotta Fraschini Beta RC.10 , 210 kW (280 hp)

Performance

- Maximum speed: 260 km/h (160 mph, 140 kn)
- Stall speed: 90 km/h (56 mph, 49 kn)
- Range: 650 km (400 mi, 350 nmi)
- Service ceiling: 6,500 m (21,300 ft)
- Time to altitude: 7 minutes to 3,000 m (9,800 ft)
