= Caudron =

French aircraft manufacturer

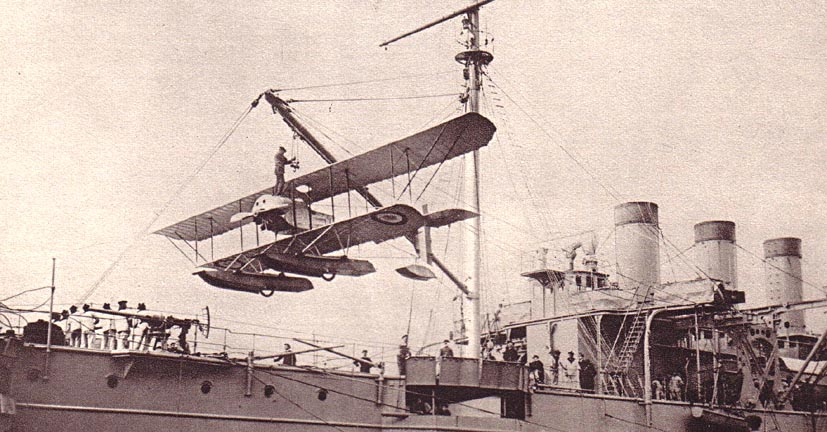
A Caudron seaplane, being hoisted on board La Foudre in April 1914

The Société des Avions Caudron was a French aircraft company founded in 1909 as the Association Aéroplanes Caudron Frères by brothers Gaston and René Caudron. It was one of the earliest aircraft manufacturers in France and produced planes for the military in both World War I and World War II. From 1933 onwards, it was a subsidiary of Renault.

== Alphonse (Gaston) (1882–1915) and René Caudron (1884–1959) ==
Born in Favières, Somme to parents who farmed nearby in Romiotte, the Caudron brothers were educated at a college in Abbeville. Gaston, as Alphonse was always known, intended to become an engineer but his education was cut short by health problems; René was interested in the development of mechanics and was a sportsman. After military service in an artillery regiment, they returned to work on the farm.

They began to build their first aircraft, a large biplane, in August 1908. Initially unable to obtain an engine, they flew it as a glider, towed by a horse, and tested it through the summer. In September 1909, they finally flew it under power. By April 1910, they were able to make a return flight of 10 km (6 mi) to Forest-Montiers.

Gaston Caudron died in an aircraft accident on 12 December 1915 at the airfield at Bron. René continued in the aircraft business until the fall of France in June 1940 during World War II. He died in 1959.

== Caudron Frères and Caudron-Renault ==
Needing a more convenient base than the farm, the brothers established their factory in nearby Le Crotoy, on the eastern side of the Somme estuary about 16 km (10 mi) from Abbeville and with a broad, flat, firm, south facing beach ideal for flying. They set up a flying school there which was functioning by 19 May 1910. This activity flourished and by early 1913 a second school had been set up at Port-Aviation (often called "Juvisy Airfield") in Viry-Châtillon with a combined capacity of 100 to 250. The War Ministry sent about 30 student pilots there in 1913. By then the company was based at Rue, Somme. During World War I, the company moved its production to Lyon and Issy-les-Moulineaux, as the Somme plant was too close to the battle front.

Designers of many aircraft like the two-seater Caudron G.3 that successfully landed on Mont Blanc in 1921, Caudron produced the trainers in which thousands of pilots got their first flying licence. The Caudron plants at Lyon and Issy-les-Moulineaux produced nearly 4,000 airplanes during World War I. In 1920, the Lyon plant stopped assembling and the Issy-les-Moulineaux site was consolidated as the headquarters and main production base. In 1933, Caudron was acquired by Renault, following pressure from the French Air Ministry, which was seeking consolidation in the aircraft industry. At the time, Renault was increasing its involvement in the aviation field. Renault took a controlling 55% stake while René Caudron kept the remaining 45%. both the Société des Avions Caudron and Renault's aircraft engine branch were integrated into the Renault Aviation division led by François Lehideux (as top manager), Marcel Riffard (as aircraft body chief designer) and Charles-Edmond Serre (aircraft engine chief designer). The Issy-les-Moulineaux plant improved synergies with the Billancourt engine plant, as both were in the Paris area. In 1937, Renault bought out René Caudron's minority stake.

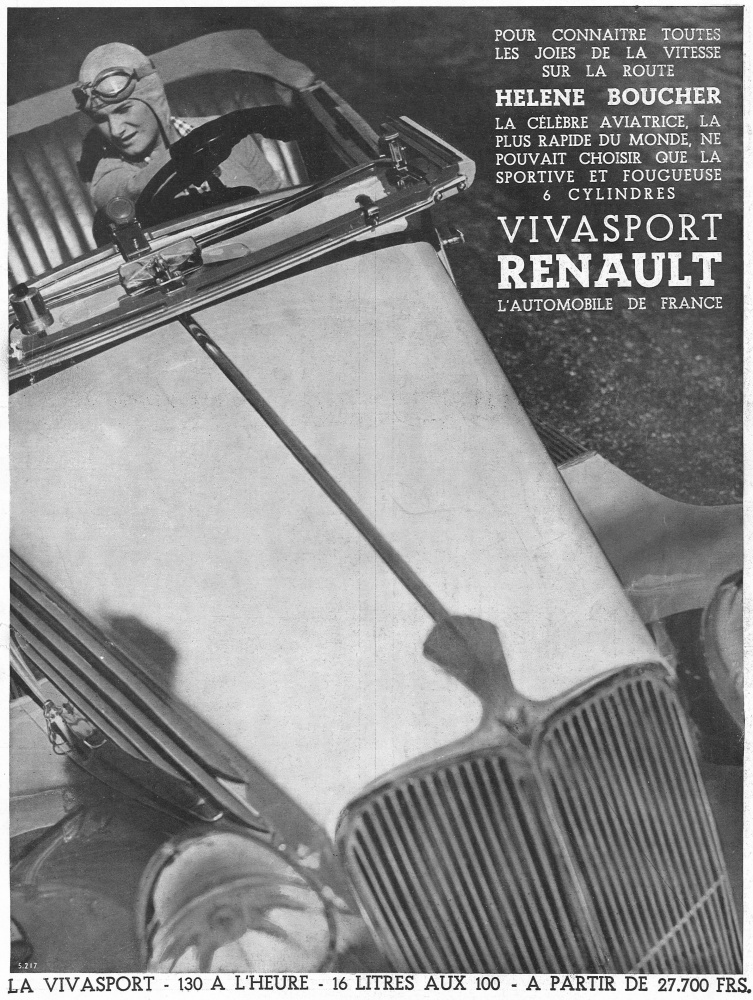
Renault used its successes on aviation to promote its core automotive business

As part of Renault, Caudron centred on producing light, sportier aircraft powered by either inline-four or inline-six cylinder engines, mirroring its automotive range at the time. Riffard was an expert on streamlined designs, which helped to achieve good speeds on low power. Caudron-Renault aircraft set several records in the 1930s. In August 1934, Hélène Boucher, on board her C 450, achieved the world record average speed for 100 kilometres, 1000 kilometres, and the world female speed record. In December 1934, Raymond Delmotte got a land aircraft world speed record of 505 km/h on board his C 460. According to Popular Aviation, by November 1935 Caudron-Renault was producing the following models: the C 272-3 Luciole (2-seat light biplane aircraft), the C 282-8 Phalene VIII (4-seat light monoplane), the C 360 (monoplane), the C 366 Atalante (a monoplane based on an earlier model), the C 440 (twin-engined low-wing cabin monoplane), the C 450 (1-seat racing monoplane), the C 460 (1-seat racing monoplane) and the C 530 Rafale (high-performance, 2-seat light monoplane).

By 1936, Renault was hit by the Great Depression and, in 1938, it spun off Caudron-Renault into a separate, autonomous subsidiary in order to focus on its core automotive business. After France was occupied by Nazi Germany during World War II, Caudron-Renault produced trainers, auto bodies, Messerschmitt aircraft parts, Messerschmitt Bf 108s the Caudron's Simoun and Goéland ranges, the Siebel Si-204, for the Wehrmacht. It also repaired aircraft. In February 1942, Willy Messerschmitt requested that Caudron produce the Messerschmitt Me 164, a Si-104 rival, but that was sabotaged. The Issy-les-Moulineaux plant was almost completely destroyed by RAF and AAF bombings that took place in September 1943, leaving it permanently out of production. In 1944, the remaining Caudron-Renault operations were nationalised by the French government and became part of the Société Nationale de Construction aéronautique du Centre.

== Aircraft ==
(Association Aéroplanes Caudron Frères / Société des avions Caudron)

- Hydroaéroplane Caudron-Fabre
- Caudron Type A
- Caudron Type B.2
- Caudron Type C
- Caudron Type D
- Caudron Type E
- Caudron Type F
- Caudron Type G
- Caudron G.2
- Caudron G.3
- Caudron G.4
- Caudron G.6
- Caudron Type H
- Caudron Type J
- Caudron Type K
- Caudron Type L
- Caudron Type M
- Caudron Type N
- Caudron Type O
- Caudron Type P
- Caudron R
- Caudron R.3
- Caudron R.3
- Caudron R.4
- Caudron R.5
- Caudron R.6
- Caudron R.8
- Caudron R.9
- Caudron R.10
- Caudron R.11
- Caudron R.12
- Caudron R.14
- Caudron R.15
- Caudron R.19
- Caudron C.02
- Caudron C.20
- Caudron C.21
- Caudron C.22
- Caudron C.23
- Caudron C.25
- Caudron C.27
- Caudron C.33
- Caudron C.37
- Caudron C.39
- Caudron C.43
- Caudron C.51
- Caudron C.59
- Caudron C.60
- Caudron C.61
- Caudron C.61bis
- Caudron C.65
- Caudron C.66
- Caudron C.67
- Caudron C.68
- Caudron C.74
- Caudron C.77
- Caudron C.81
- Caudron C.91
- Caudron C.92
- Caudron C.97
- Caudron C.98
- Caudron C.99
- Caudron C.101
- Caudron C.103
- Caudron C.104
- Caudron C.107
- Caudron C.109
- Caudron C.110
- Caudron C.113
- Caudron C.117
- Caudron C.125
- Caudron C.127
- Caudron C.128
- Caudron C.128/2
- Caudron C.140
- Caudron C.150
- Caudron C.157
- Caudron C.159
- Caudron C.160
- Caudron C.161
- Caudron C.168
- Caudron C.180
- Caudron C.183
- Caudron C.190
- Caudron C.191
- Caudron C.192
- Caudron C.193
- Caudron C.220
- Caudron C.221
- Caudron C.230
- Caudron C.232
- Caudron C.240
- Caudron C.250
- Caudron C.251
- Caudron C.270 Luciole
- Caudron C.272 Luciole
- Caudron C.272/2 Luciole
- Caudron C.272/3 Luciole
- Caudron C.272/4 Luciole
- Caudron C.272/5 Luciole
- Caudron C.273 Luciole
- Caudron C.275 Luciole
- Caudron C.280 Phalene
- Caudron C.280/2 Phalene
- Caudron C.280/6 Phalene
- Caudron C.280/9 Phalene
- Caudron C.282 Super Phalene
- Caudron C.282/4 Super Phalene
- Caudron C.282/8 Super Phalene
- Caudron C.282/10 Super Phalene
- Caudron C.286 Super Phalene
- Caudron C.286/2 Super Phalene
- Caudron C.286/2.S4 Super Phalene
- Caudron C.286/4 Super Phalene
- Caudron C.286/5 Super Phalene
- Caudron C.286/6 Super Phalene
- Caudron C.286/7 Super Phalene
- Caudron C.286/8 Super Phalene
- Caudron C.286/9 Super Phalene
- Caudron C.289 Super Phalene
- Caudron C.289/2 Super Phalene
- Caudron C.340 Micro Phalene
- Caudron C.344 Phalène Junior
- Caudron C.360
- Caudron C.362
- Caudron C.366
- Caudron C.400 Super Phalene
- Caudron C.401 Super Phalene
- Caudron C.410 Super Phalene
- Caudron C.430 Rafale
- Caudron C.440 Goéland
- Caudron C.441 Goéland
- Caudron C.444 Goéland
- Caudron C.445 Goéland
- Caudron C.445/1 Goéland
- Caudron C.445/2 Goéland
- Caudron C.445/3 Goéland
- Caudron C.445M Goéland
- Caudron C.445R Goéland
- Caudron C.446 Super Goéland
- Caudron C.447 Goéland
- Caudron C.448 Goéland
- Caudron C.449 Goéland
- Caudron C.449/1 Goéland
- Caudron C.449/2 Goéland
- Caudron C.449/3 Goéland
- Caudron C.449/4 Goéland
- Caudron C.449/5 Goéland
- Caudron C.450
- Caudron C.460
- Caudron C.461
- Caudron C.480 Frégate
- Caudron C.490
- Caudron C.491
- Caudron C.500 Simoun I
- Caudron C.510 Pélican
- Caudron C.520 Simoun
- Caudron C.530 Rafale
- Caudron C.560
- Caudron C.561
- Caudron C.570
- Caudron C.580
- Caudron C.600 Aiglon
- Caudron C.601 Aiglon
- Caudron C.610 Aiglon
- Caudron C.620 Simoun IV
- Caudron C.630 Simoun
- Caudron C.631 Simoun
- Caudron C.632 Simoun
- Caudron C.634 Simoun
- Caudron C.635 Simoun
- Caudron C.635M Simoun
- Caudron C.640 Typhon
- Caudron C.641 Typhon
- Caudron C.660 Rafale
- Caudron C.670 Typhon
- Caudron C.680
- Caudron C.684
- Caudron C.685 Super Rafale
- Caudron C.690
- Caudron C.710 Cyclone
- Caudron C.711 Cyclone
- Caudron C.712 Cyclone
- Caudron C.713 Cyclone
- Caudron C.714 Cyclone
- Caudron C.720 Cyclone
- Caudron-Renault CR.760 Cyclone
- Caudron-Renault CR.770 Cyclone
- Caudron C.800 Epervier
- Caudron C.801
- Caudron C.810
- Caudron C.811
- Caudron C-815
- Caudron C.860
- Caudron C.870
- Caudron C.880
- Caudron KXC
- Caudron Navy Experimental Type C Trainer
- Caudron LEI
