= Caudron Type H =

General information
- Type: Military amphibious biplane
- National origin: France
- Manufacturer: Caudron
- Number built: 2

History
- First flight: late 1912-early 1913

The Caudron Type H was a collective name for three different Caudron designs of 1912–1913. One of these was an amphibious three-seat biplane built for the French military. Two were completed, one appearing at the Paris Aero Salon in November 1912.

== Design and development ==
The Caudron brothers used the designations H and M to distinguish hydravions (seaplanes) from monoplanes in their catalogue for distribution at the 1912 Paris Salon. The H category included three different designs: a two-seat development of the pusher configuration Caudron-Fabre biplane, built for Claude Graham-White; a tractor configuration two-bay biplane; and a large, three-seat, three-bay biplane which was the only Caudron seaplane displayed at the Salon. Apart from the evidence of a few photographs, rather little detail has survived about the first two but more is known about the Salon aircraft, described below.

Apart from its tractor engine, the Salon machine had the same layout as all other Caudron biplane designs from the Type C of 1912 to the G.4 of 1915. Its wings were rectangular in plan apart from their rounded tips; the upper span was 45% greater than the lower. There was no stagger, so the three sets of parallel interplane struts on each side were vertical. Roll control was by wing warping.

In common with the other Caudron biplanes, the Salon Type H did not have a conventional fuselage. Instead, a pair of girders, each tapering in profile and with two vertical cross-members, were mounted parallel to each other in plan. On all types the upper members were attached to the upper wing; on landplanes the lower member passed under the lower wing and supported the landing wheels, but on Caudron seaplanes they were kept out of the water by joining the lower wing. A rectangular plan tailplane was placed just under the upper girder members at the extreme tail, with three small, rectangular vertical tails on its upper surface between the girders in a departure from the Caudron norm.

The three crew were accommodated in a flat-sided nacelle, mounted above the lower wing, with a semi-cowled, 52 kW (70 hp) Gnome Lambda seven-cylinder rotary engine in the nose and the pilot placed at about mid-chord. The aircraft was amphibious, with short, broad, single-stepped floats, each mounted on pairs of N-form struts under the central wing bays, assisted by two smaller, unstepped floats attached to the lower tailboom girders under the tailplane. The main, underwing floats had single mainwheels largely within them, set about two-thirds of the way back and enclosed above by roughly semicircular covers. The floats were not sprung and the only springing in the wheeled gear was in the pneumatic tyres. The Caudron brothers patented this arrangement.

It is not known if the first of the two examples built had flown before the Type H was exhibited at the Salon in November 1912. It was marked as a military machine, possibly intended for use in the French colonial empire, and was received by the French military on 14 February 1913 with serial CC5. At least one of the two was modified to have a land undercarriage with pairs of main wheels and a long skid on a wire braced N-form strut under each of the inner interplane struts pairs.

The first example flew at an event hosted by the Boulogne Aero-Club on 14 July 1913, taking off from the beach, though on different, longer floats.

== Specifications (1912 Salon) ==
Data from Hauet (2001), p.39

General characteristics

- Crew: three
- Length: 10.0 m (32 ft 10 in)
- Upper wingspan: 14.0 m (45 ft 11 in)
- Lower wingspan: 9.6 m (31 ft 6 in)
- Wing area: 35 m^{2} (380 sq ft)
- Empty weight: 400 kg (882 lb)
- Gross weight: 660 kg (1,455 lb)
- Powerplant: 1 × Gnome Lambda , 7-cylinder rotary in tractor configuration, 52 kW (70 hp)
- Propellers: 2-bladed Integrale

Performance

- Maximum speed: 80 km/h (50 mph, 43 kn) . Flight gives 97 km/h (60 mph)
- Time to altitude: 15 min to 500 m (1,640 ft)
