= Caudron Type F =

Type F

General information
- Type: Single seat tractor configuration biplane
- National origin: France
- Manufacturer: Caudron

History
- First flight: Early 1913
- Developed from: Caudron Type E
- Developed into: Caudron Type G

The Caudron Type F was a French single-seat biplane produced just before World War I. China bought a dozen and at least two other examples, with different engines, competed in 1913, coming first and second in the biplane category of the cross-country race at Reims, France. Flown by Pierre Chanteloup, one was the first biplane to loop-the-loop.

== Design and development ==
The Type F was a single-seat biplane with the same layout as all other Caudron land-based biplanes before it, apart from the Type B Multiplace. They were all twin-boom tractor-configuration aircraft with a short central nacelle and twin fins. Compared to the Type B-to-Type E range, the Type F differed most obviously in the nacelle design and the vertical tail shape. By 1913, when the Type F appeared, at least one of each of the earlier types had been modified from an equal-span biplane to a sesquiplane; like the Type E, the Type F was a sesquiplane from the start.

Like these earlier Caudrons, the Type F was a wire-braced two-bay biplane with two-spar fabric-covered wings having the same rectangular plan apart from angled tips. Upper and lower spans were in the ratio 1:8. There was no stagger, so the two sets of parallel interplane struts were parallel and vertical. The outer sections of the upper wings were supported by parallel pairs of outward-leaning struts from the bases of the outer interplane struts, at the tip of the lower wing. The rear spar was ahead of mid-chord, leaving the ribs in the rear part of the wing flexible and allowing roll control by wing warping.

The nacelle was a development of the earlier simple, flat-sided structures, but no longer with its sides curving upwards in profile to the engine. Instead, the upper edges of this structure were straight, with a curved decking which ran forward, rounding into a cowling around the 37 kW (50 hp) Gnome Omega seven-cylinder radial engine. The cowling was more complete than on the earlier models, though in the manner of the time there was a gap at the bottom to allow lost oil to escape. At least one Type F had an uncowled Anzani 10-cylinder radial engine. The cockpit's forward rim was raised up, making it more enclosed and better defined; similar protection had been introduced on the Type D2 and Type E. As before, the nacelle was supported above the lower wing on two more pairs of interplane struts; these were enclosed by the nacelle, as on the Type D.

The empennage of the Type F was supported on a pair of girders arranged parallel to one another in plan. The upper girder members were attached to the upper wing spars at the tops of the innermost interplane struts and the lower ones ran under the lower wing, mounted on inverted W-form struts from the bottom of the inner interplane pairs. These lower members, which supported the aircraft on the ground as skids, each carried twin, rubber sprung landing wheels. Behind the wing the upper and lower members converged to the rear, the drag on the lower members reducing the landing run. There were three vertical cross-braces on each girder but the only lateral inter-girder cross-members were near the tail, though there was wire bracing. The broad-chord, roughly rectangular, warping tailplane was mounted just below the upper girder member. Above it and instead of the earlier rectangular rudders there was a pair of small triangular fins, each mounting a broad rudder with a gently rounded leading edges and a straight, vertical trailing edge. The fins were separated by about one-third of the tailplane span.

In 1913 Caudron had already sold at least two of the earlier two-seat Type Ds to China and by early 1913 they had obtained an order for twelve of the single-seat Type Fs. Emile Obre, from Caudron, and Bon, from the French colonial forces, went to Peking (now Beijing) to organise an aviation centre. Two Type Fs competed at the Reims meeting at the end of September 1913, one Anzani-powered and flown by Gaston Caudron and the other, Gnome-powered, flown by his brother René. René won first prize in the biplane category of the cross-country event at an average speed of 94 km/h (58 mph) and another for setting the fastest lap time. His brother finished second at an average speed of 94 km/h (58 mph). On 21 November 1913 Pierre Chanteloup in the Gnome-powered Type F performed the first commanded loops in a biplane, as well as other aerobatic manoeuvres, at Issy-les-Moulineaux.

In August 1914, a Type F purchased by Will Scotland arrived in New Zealand. After the aircraft crashed on a test flight at Christchurch during September 1914, it was acquired by the New Zealand Flying School. Following repair, it was first flown from Kohimarama by Vivian Walsh on 13 December 1915. During its time with the school, it was used to train pilots for World War I and was operated on custom-built floats, becoming the first twin-float seaplane in New Zealand. The aircraft was damaged beyond repair on 31 August 1916 when it stalled in a turn and crashed into Waitemata Harbour.

== Specifications (50 hp Gnome) ==
Data from Hauet (2001) p.62-4

General characteristics

- Crew: one
- Length: 6.40 m (21 ft 0 in)
- Upper wingspan: 10.10 m (33 ft 2 in)
- Lower wingspan: 5.75 m (18 ft 10 in)
- Height: 2.60 m (8 ft 6 in)
- Wing area: 22 m^{2} (240 sq ft)
- Empty weight: 280 kg (617 lb)
- Powerplant: 1 × Gnome Omega 7-cylinder rotary, 37 kW (50 hp)
- Propellers: 2-bladed

Performance

- Maximum speed: 100 km/h (62 mph, 54 kn)
- Endurance: at least 4.5 hr
- Time to altitude: 5 min to 500 m (1,600 ft) when fuelled for 4.5 hrs flight
- Landing speed:40 km/h (25 mph)
