= Caudron Type E =

Two-seat trainer biplane first flown in 1912

Type E

General information
- Type: Two seat trainer biplane
- National origin: France
- Manufacturer: Caudron
- Number built: 4

History
- First flight: c. September 1912
- Developed from: Caudron Type C

The Caudron Type E two-seat trainer aircraft was a larger and more powerful development of the Type C. Two or three were bought by the French military and one by the Royal Navy just before World War I, but its sales were overtaken by the superior Type G.

== Design and development ==
All Caudron biplane landplanes from before and into the First World War followed the same layout: tractor configuration, short nacelles, twin booms, large tailplanes, and twin fins. From the Type A to the Type G.3, all were single-engined. All types contained sesquiplane examples; the early types were modified from equal-span biplanes and later ones, from the type E onwards, were sesquiplanes from the start. In contrast to its immediate predecessors, the Type C and Type D, the Type E was a two-seater, bigger and more powerful. It was designed as a military training aircraft.

The two-spar fabric covered wings had the same rectangular plan, apart from angled tips, and had an upper-to-lower span ratio close to 1.5. There were two wire-braced bays on each side, though the inner ones were only about half the width of the outer. There was no stagger, so the interplane struts were parallel and vertical. The overhang of the upper wing was supported by parallel, outward leaning struts from the bases of the outer interplane struts. The rear spar was ahead of mid-chord, leaving the ribs in the rear part of the wing flexible and allowing roll control by wing warping.

The two-seat nacelle was developed from the earlier simple, flat-sided structure of the Type B, supported above the lower wing on two more pairs of external interplane struts. It was larger, with more space for the two occupants and military equipment. The pilot was at the rear with the second seat forward; the upper fuselage ahead of the cockpit was raised, leaving the occupants less exposed. A 52 kW (70 hp) Gnome Lambda rotary engine was mounted in the front under a semi-circular cowling intended to deflect oil spray.

The empennage of the Type E was supported on a pair of girders arranged parallel to one another in plan. The upper girder members were attached to the upper wing spars at the tops of the innermost interplane struts and the lower ones ran under the lower wing, mounted on downward extensions of the inner interplane struts. The mounting was strengthened with two diagonal struts on each side, one from the base of the forward interplane strut to the upcurved tip of the lower member and the other from the rear interplane strut to the junction of the lower member and its first vertical cross member. Each of these lower members, which supported the aircraft on the ground as skids, carried twin, rubber-sprung landing wheels. Behind the wing the upper and lower members converged to the rear; the drag on the lower members shortened the landing run. The wingspans of the Type E were 0.5 m (1.6 ft) greater than those of the Type C with an increase of the inner bay width which placed the booms further apart and increased the undercarriage track from 2.4 to 3.0 m (8 to 10 ft), making landings easier. There were three vertical cross braces on each girder but the only lateral inter-girder cross-members were near the tail, though there was wire bracing. The broad chord, roughly rectangular, warping tailplane was mounted a little below the upper girder member. Above it, a pair of blunt-cornered, rectangular rudders were separated by about one-third of the tailplane span.

== Operational history ==
The French government received two Type Es, the first in September 1912 and the second a month later. Two more were built but proved hard to sell, probably because the superior Caudron Type G was becoming available. A Chinese order for Type Es was changed in favor of the newer type. One was sold to the Royal Navy though its acceptance was delayed until 29 June 1914 whilst modifications were made. (Note: Sturtivant and Page identify this aircraft, Naval serial no. 45, as a Caudron G.3 This may have been a contemporary confusion between somewhat similar Caudron types, or it may be an error of Hauet. Until photographic evidence is found this will remain a puzzle.) The fate of the fourth and final Type E is uncertain, though it may have replaced the first French government machine after its loss in May 1913. If so, it had been modernized with the pointed, round-edge form introduced on the Type F and used on all the G types.

== Operators ==
France
Aeronautique Militaire
United Kingdom
Royal Naval Air Service

== Specifications ==
Data from Hauet (2001)

General characteristics

- Crew: one pilot
- Capacity: one passenger
- Length: 7.15 m (23 ft 5 in)
- Upper wingspan: 10.8 m (35 ft 5 in)
- Lower wingspan: 7.3 m (23 ft 11 in)
- Wing area: 28 m^{2} (300 sq ft)
- Empty weight: 295 kg (650 lb)
- Gross weight: 555 kg (1,224 lb)
- Powerplant: 1 × Gnome Lambda 7-cylinder rotary, 52 kW (70 hp)
- Propellers: 2-bladed

Performance

- Maximum speed: 90 km/h (56 mph, 49 kn)
- Time to altitude: 10 min to 500 m (1,600 ft)
