= Caudron C. 02 =

Caudron 02

General information
- Type: Single seat fighter aircraft
- National origin: France
- Manufacturer: Caudron
- Designer: Paul Deville

History
- First flight: November 1917

The Caudron 02 was a French high-altitude single-seat fighter that was flown in November 1917.

== Design and development ==
The proper name and even the existence of this aircraft have been disputed in the past, but plans for the Type 02 high altitude fighter aircraft have since been found in the French Musée de l'Air. Hauet also refers to it as the C.02 and Green and Swanborough as the Type O, though the latter was a quite different sports aircraft from 1914.

The Type 02 was designed to fight at altitudes up to 9,000 m (29,500 ft) through a combination of engine power and flat airfoil section. It was a conventional single bay biplane with fabric covered, unswept, parallel chord wings ending in angled tips. The lower wing was smaller than the upper one, with a span reduced by 13% and a narrower chord. The wings had neither stagger nor dihedral and only the upper wing was fitted with ailerons. There was a pair of parallel, upright, streamlined interplane struts on each side, with the usual diagonal wire bracing. The upper wing was close to the fuselage, linked by four short, leaning cabane struts.

The intention was to power the Type 02 operationally with either a 112 kW (150 hp) Gnome 9N or a 127–134 kW (170–180 hp) Le Rhône 9R engine, though for about fours months of initial testing it was fitted with a 89 kW (120 hp) Le Rhône 9Jb. All of these engines were nine cylinder rotaries. Photographs show neat, close fitted cowlings. Behind the engine the fuselage maintained a circular cross-section. The pilot's open cockpit was placed under the upper trailing edge, where there was a semi-circular cut-out to increase his upward field of view. The Type 02's tailplane was of unusually long chord and in plan was a highly swept delta, mounted on top of the fuselage. The fin was also wide and shallow, though less angular. It had an unbalanced rudder which reached down to the keel, operating in a nick in the elevators. There was a tailskid undercarriage with mainwheels on a single axle with a 1.50 m (4 ft 11 in) track, sprung from forward raked V-struts from the lower fuselage.

First tests were made in November 1917, using the lower powered Le Rhône engine and flying from a base at 4,000 m (13,100 ft). The more powerful Gnome engine was not tested until April 1918; and the larger Le Rhône was also fitted that spring. It is not known how many prototypes were built but the Type 02 did not enter production; it handled well but its performance and armament were not a significant improvement over those of the SPAD S.XIII, already in series production.

== Specifications (Le Rhone 9R) ==
Data from Hauet (2001) p.135

General characteristics

- Crew: One
- Length: 6.425 m (21 ft 1 in)
- Upper wingspan: 7.50 m (24 ft 7 in)
- Lower wingspan: 6.50 m (21 ft 4 in)
- Height: 2.48 m (8 ft 2 in)
- Wing area: 17 m^{2} (180 sq ft)
- Empty weight: 400 kg (882 lb) with Gnome 9N engine
- Gross weight: 813 kg (1,792 lb)
- Powerplant: 1 × Le Rhône 9R 9-cylinder air-cooled rotary, 130 kW (180 hp) 170/180 ch
- Propellers: 2-bladed

Performance

- Maximum speed: 210 km/h (130 mph, 110 kn) at 4,000 m (13,123 ft)
- Endurance: 2 hr
- Time to altitude: 10 min to 4,000 m (13,123 ft)

Armament

- Guns: 1 or 2 × 7.7 mm (0.303 in) Vickers machine guns
