= C51 =

C51 or C-51 may refer to:

== Legislation ==
- Anti-terrorism Act, 2015, introduced as Bill C-51 in the 41st Canadian Parliament, 2nd Session
- Bill C-51 of the 39th Canadian Parliament, 2nd Session, a proposed amendment to the Food and Drugs Act

== Vehicles ==
- ARM General Juan N. Mendez (C51), an Admirable-class minesweeper of the Mexican Navy
- Caudron C.51, a French biplane floatplane
- Douglas C-51, an American transport aircraft
- JNR Class C51, a Japanese steam locomotive

== Other uses ==
- Caldwell 51, an irregular dwarf galaxy
- Evans Gambit, a chess opening
- GeForce 6100, a graphics processing unit
