= C67 =

C67 or C-67 may refer to:

- Berlin Defence (chess), a chess opening
- Bladder cancer
- Caldwell 67, a barred spiral galaxy
- Caudron C.67, a French biplane
- Douglas C-67 Dragon, an American transport aircraft
- Hours of Work and Rest Periods (Road Transport) Convention, 1939 of the International Labour Organization
