= C65 =

C65 or C-65 may refer to:

- Autovía C-65, a road in Catalonia, Spain
- Berlin Defence (chess), a chess opening
- Caldwell 65, a spiral galaxy
- Caudron C.65, a French biplane
- Commodore 65, a prototype home computer
- Honda Super Cub, a motorcycle
- Siemens C65, a mobile phone
- Stout XC-65, an American experimental aircraft
- C65, a racing car chassis from Courage Compétition
