= C68 =

C68 may refer to:

- Caldwell 68, a reflection/emission nebula
- Caudron C.68, a French biplane
- Douglas C-68, an American transport plane
- Ruy Lopez, Exchange Variation, a chess opening
- Bill C-68, which created the Canadian Firearms Registry
