= Hydroaéroplane Caudron-Fabre =

Caudron-Fabre
- The Caudron-Fabre taking-off during the March 1912 competition

General information
- Type: Competition floatplane
- National origin: France
- Manufacturer: Caudron
- Number built: 1

History
- First flight: c. July 1911; 115 years ago

The Hydroaéroplane Caudron-Fabre, (Caudron-Fabre), was a French amphibious seaplane that competed in the 1912 Monaco event. It was one of the first true amphibians, able to take-off from water and touch down on land.

== Design and development ==
On 28 March 1910, the Frenchman Henri Fabre made the first successful take-off from and landing on water. His float design was the first to allow an aircraft to break away from the surface and was patented. Its success attracted the interest of most of the major French aircraft builders, who saw new possibilities for aviation opening up. Glenn Curtiss bought a licence to build them.

These aviators included René Caudron, who combined Fabre's floats with a new aeroplane design that retained many of the characteristics of his Type B.2, Type C, Type D and Type E unequal span two bay biplanes. The wings of the Caudron-Fabre were particularly similar to those of the B2 and D2, rectangular in plan, apart from slightly angled tips, equal chord and mounted without stagger. There were two spars, one at the leading edge and one at about one third chord, with interplane struts in parallel pairs connecting forward and aft spars. Those defining the bays and the centre section were vertical but the outer pairs leaned strongly outwards to support the longer upper wings. Lateral control was achieved by wing warping.

The Caudron-Fabre, like the earlier Caudron land-planes, had no enclosed fuselage but instead a pair of parallel vertical girders, each with cross-members but only cross-braced horizontally towards the tail. On the land-planes the lower longitudinal members of the girder ran to the undercarriage; this was not practical on the float-plane so they were replaced by horizontal members running forward from the tail to beyond the wing. These extensions, braced by sloping struts on each side to both of the centre section struts formed a kind of outrigger on which the pilot sat, exposed, just forward of the leading edge. Behind the pilot and mounted on the rear pair of the centre-section struts was an un-cowled, pusher configuration 60 hp (45 kW) Anzani 6-cylinder radial engine. Long cut-outs from the trailing edges of both wings were needed to clear the path of the large diameter, two blade propeller. A rectangular tailplane was mounted on a cross member between the upper girders, strengthened by outward diagonal bracing, with broad chord elevator-like surfaces extending beyond. A pair of rectangular rudders were hinged, close together, from this same cross-member.

The Caudron-Fabre had an undercarriage composed of both wheels and floats, though it was possible to remove the former; photographs show the aircraft in both configurations. There was no cross-axle, each wheel being mounted individually on two pairs of outwardly splayed V-struts from the feet of the inner interplane struts and another to the feet of the nearest centre-section struts. Its floats were mounted immediately ahead of the wheels, articulated at a forward point on their centreline by a strut from the outrigger, a strut from the wing leading edge over the wheels and another from the wheel axle. A rear strut had a pneumatic shock absorber. A third float, similar in size and shape, was mounted on a vertical strut attached to the girder cross-member ahead of the tailplane, braced at its lower end by a pair of struts angled up to the ends of the vertical girders. The floats were flat bottomed with segmental section and an almost square plan, with a width about 70% of their length. As on Fabre's original aircraft, they were mounted with a pronounced angle of attack.

== Operational history ==
The Caudron-Fabre left the Caudron factory in July 1911, and when the requirements of the Monaco competition were released, towards the end of 1911, Caudron was able to modify the aircraft to meet them. Nonetheless, at the end of the March 1912 event it was only placed fifth out of nine competitors, with Farman aircraft first and second. It did attract attention as the only amphibian present and has been claimed as the first truly amphibious aircraft, able to operate from land or water without having to change its undercarriage.

== Specifications ==
Data from Hauet (2001) p.36

General characteristics

- Crew: One
- Length: 7.25 m (23 ft 9 in)
- Wingspan: 10.6 m (34 ft 9 in)
- Wing area: 30 m^{2} (320 sq ft)
- Gross weight: 400 kg (882 lb)
- Powerplant: 1 × Anzani 6-cylinder 6-cylinder, two row air-cooled radial piston engine, 45 kW (60 hp)
- Propellers: 2-bladed

Performance

- Maximum speed: 85 km/h (53 mph, 46 kn)
