= C66 =

C66 or C-66 may refer to:

- C-66 (Michigan county highway)
- Berlin Defence (chess), a chess opening
- Caldwell 66, a globular cluster
- Caudron C.66, a French biplane
- HMCS Uganda (C66), later renamed HMCS Quebec, a Fiji-class cruiser of the Royal Canadian Navy
- Lockheed C-66 Lodestar, an American transport aircraft
- Migration for Employment Convention, 1939 of the International Labour Organization
- Siemens C66, a mobile phone
