= Caudron Typhon =

French utility aircraft

Typhon
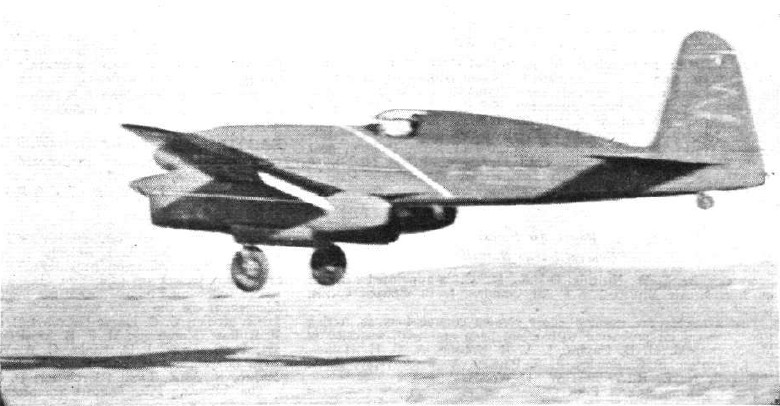
- C.641 Typhon (high-speed version) With a view to attacking a number of long distance records, including that for 5,000 km, the French pilot Maurice Rossi testing his Renault-engined Caudron Typhon at Istres aerodrome. (Flight magazine, 1937)

General information
- Type: High-Speed Mailplane
- Manufacturer: Caudron-Renault
- Designer: Georges Otfinovsky/Marcel Riffard
- Number built: 10

History
- Introduction date: 1935
- First flight: 1935

The Caudron C.640 Typhon was a 1930s French high-speed single-seat monoplane utility aircraft built by Caudron-Renault.

== History ==
Similar in concept to the de Havilland DH.88 Comet the Typhon (en: Typhoon) was designed by Georges Otfinovsky and Marcel Riffard for use on long-range postal routes. The first aircraft first flew on 17 June 1935. The aircraft was a twin-engined low-wing cantilever monoplane of wooden construction. Seven C.640s were built. The Typhon established 5000 km speed records. It was not a success in operation as its flexible wings experienced buffeting and vibration problems.

== Variants ==
- C.640 Typhon - production model with Renault 6Q engines, 7 built.
- C.641 Typhon - record breaking version with raised canopy and increased fuel capacity, 2 built.
- C.670 Typhon - prototype high-speed bomber version with a crew of three, similar to the C.640 but with increased dimensions and weights, one built.

== Operators ==
France

- French Air Force

Romania

- Romanian Air Force

== Specifications (C.640) ==
Data from Aviafrance : Caudron C.640 'Typhon'

General characteristics

- Crew: 2
- Length: 10.95 m (35 ft 11 in)
- Wingspan: 11.5 m (37 ft 9 in)
- Height: 3 m (9 ft 10 in)
- Wing area: 28 m^{2} (300 sq ft)
- Empty weight: 1,630 kg (3,594 lb)
- Gross weight: 3,400 kg (7,496 lb)
- Powerplant: 2 × Renault 6Q 6-cylinder inverted air-cooled in-line piston engines, 164 kW (220 hp) each
- Propellers: 2-bladed Ratier

Performance

- Maximum speed: 400 km/h (250 mph, 220 kn)
- Cruise speed: 370 km/h (230 mph, 200 kn)
- Range: 3,725 km (2,315 mi, 2,011 nmi)
- Service ceiling: 7,000 m (23,000 ft)

== See also ==
Aircraft of comparable role, configuration, and era

- de Havilland DH.88
- Grigorovich E-2
