= Caudron C.27 =

French biplane

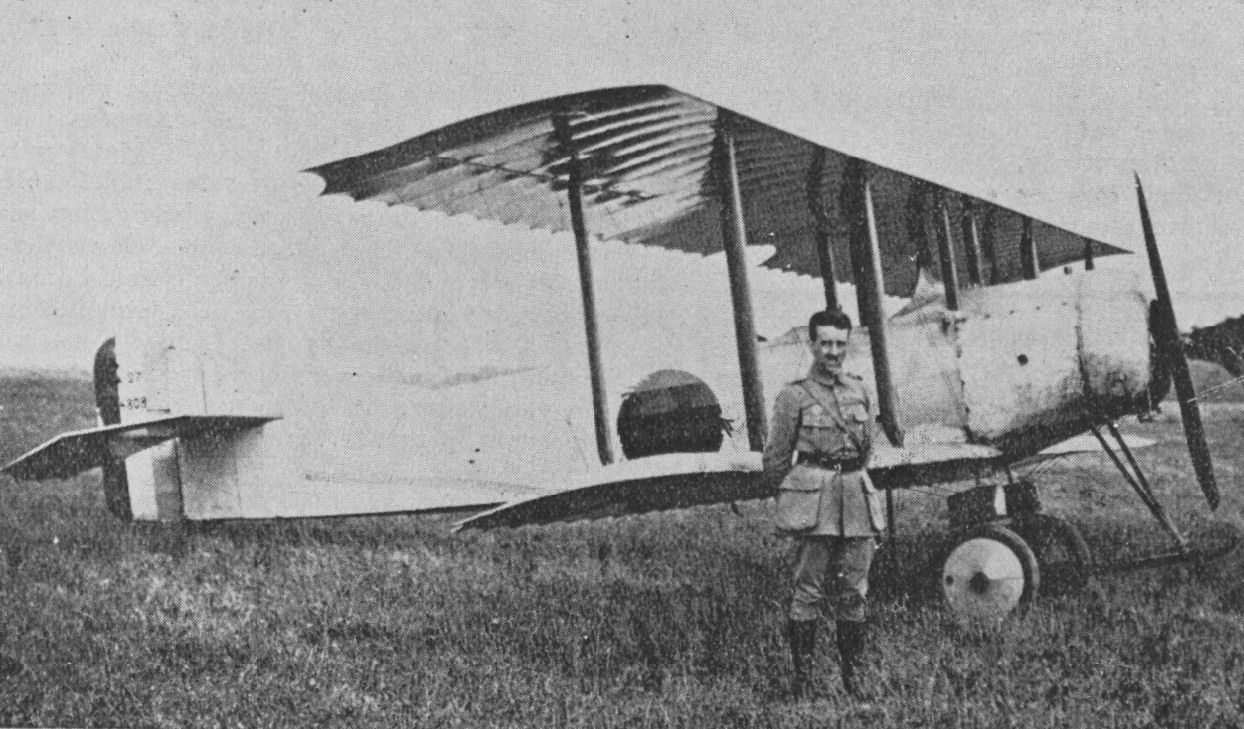

General information
- Type: Basic trainer
- National origin: France
- Manufacturer: Caudron
- Designer: Paul Deville
- Number built: more than 20

History
- First flight: first half of 1922

The Caudron C.27 was a French biplane, a two-seat basic trainer which also competed successfully in the 1920s.

== Design and development ==
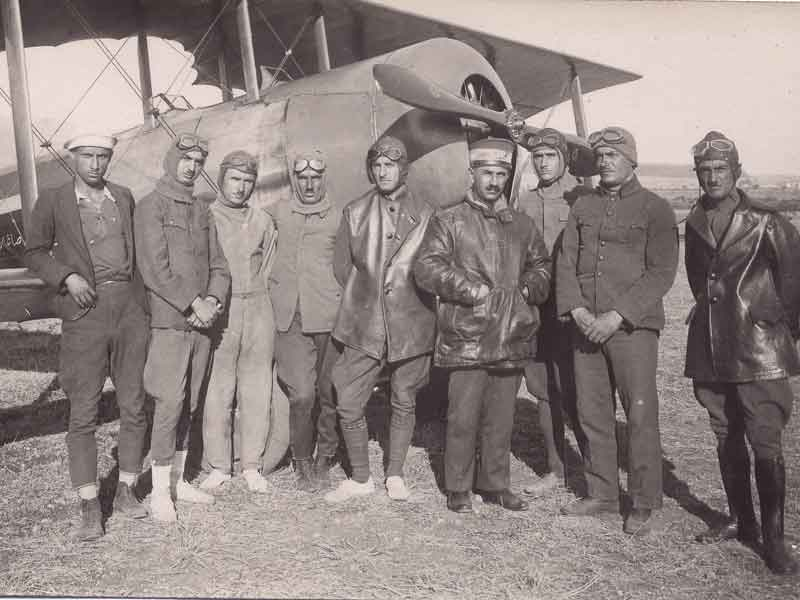
A Caudron C.27 in Turkish service

When it was shown at the 1922 Paris Salon, the C.27 was presented as the second in a triplet of increasingly demanding trainers, starting with the Caudron G.3 and ending with the more powerful Caudron C.59, though Hauet describes it as a basic trainer.

It was a two bay biplane, without stagger or significant dihedral. It had rectangular plan wings, each built around two wooden spars and fabric covered. These were braced with parallel interplane struts, assisted by piano-wire bracing. There were simple parallel cabane struts between the upper wing centre section and the upper fuselage longerons. Ailerons were fitted only to the upper wing.

The C.27 was powered by an 80 hp (60 kW) Le Rhône 9C nine cylinder air-cooled rotary engine, driving a two blade propeller and with a cowling which surrounded its upper three-quarters. Behind the engine the fuselage had a cross-braced beam structure. The open cockpits were in tandem between the wings, the pupil's slightly forward of mid-chord and the instructor's close behind under the trailing edge, which had a rounded cut-out to improve his vision. At the rear a long, shallow triangular fin carried a straight edged balanced rudder which reached down to the keel. The tailplane was mounted on top of the fuselage and the elevators were cut away centrally to allow rudder movement. The C.27 had a fixed tail skid undercarriage with its wheels on a single axle supported by two pairs of V-struts from the lower fuselage. The forward members of these were originally double with a shock absorber in their upper parts, together with an elaborately wire braced central skid to prevent nose-overs, but the skid was soon abandoned and the double struts replaced by single ones.

At least one C.27 flew with an 80 hp (60 kW) Anzani engine. The name C.27 was used to at least mid-1924 but at the Paris Salon L'Aérophile noted that the designation had changed to C.127. From 1925 several were fitted with 130 hp (97 kW) Clerget 9B nine cylinder rotary engines and designated C.125.

The C.128 was again very similar but powered by a 120 hp (89 kW) Salmson 9AC, a nine-cylinder, air cooled radial engine. This had a smaller diameter than the rotaries and was mounted in a tapered nose with its cylinders exposed. There was a 14% increase in empty weight from the C.127 and a slight increase in span and area. At least five were built or converted.

At least twenty-one C.27, C.125, C.127 and C.128 aircraft appeared on the French civil register.

== Operational history ==
The exact date of the first flight, piloted by Boulard, is not known but the aircraft was flown publicly at Orly at the end of June 1922. It was piloted by Thoret, who particularly impressed onlookers with a polished aerobatic performance, the last part with his engine off. Two years later a C.27 piloted by Patin won the 1924 Zenith Cup, a trophy based on fuel consumption and load carrying ability, and Adrienne Bolland set a women's record in another C.27 when she completed 212 consecutive loops.

A C.128 came second in the 1926 Zenith Cup and in September 1927 one carried five people to win a competition at a rally in Auvergne. In September 1927 a C.128 won a prize by carrying five people. In September 1928 pilots Mauler and Baud, with cameraman Cohendy set out on a flight, made in stages of about 350–400 km (220–250 mi) from Paris to the Cape of Good Hope via the West African coast. The flight was organised by Le Peit Paisien newspaper and by Paramount films, for whom Cohendy recorded their journey. It was the first flight from France to the Cape. They then flew back to Paris after a round trip of about 35,000 km (22,000 mi).

In 1930 a modified C.128, ordered by the Société Pour le Développement de l'Aviation (Society for the development of aviation) and designated C.128/2 was equipped to allow an acrobat to hang on a trapeze under the aircraft and also to permit wing-walking.

== Variants ==
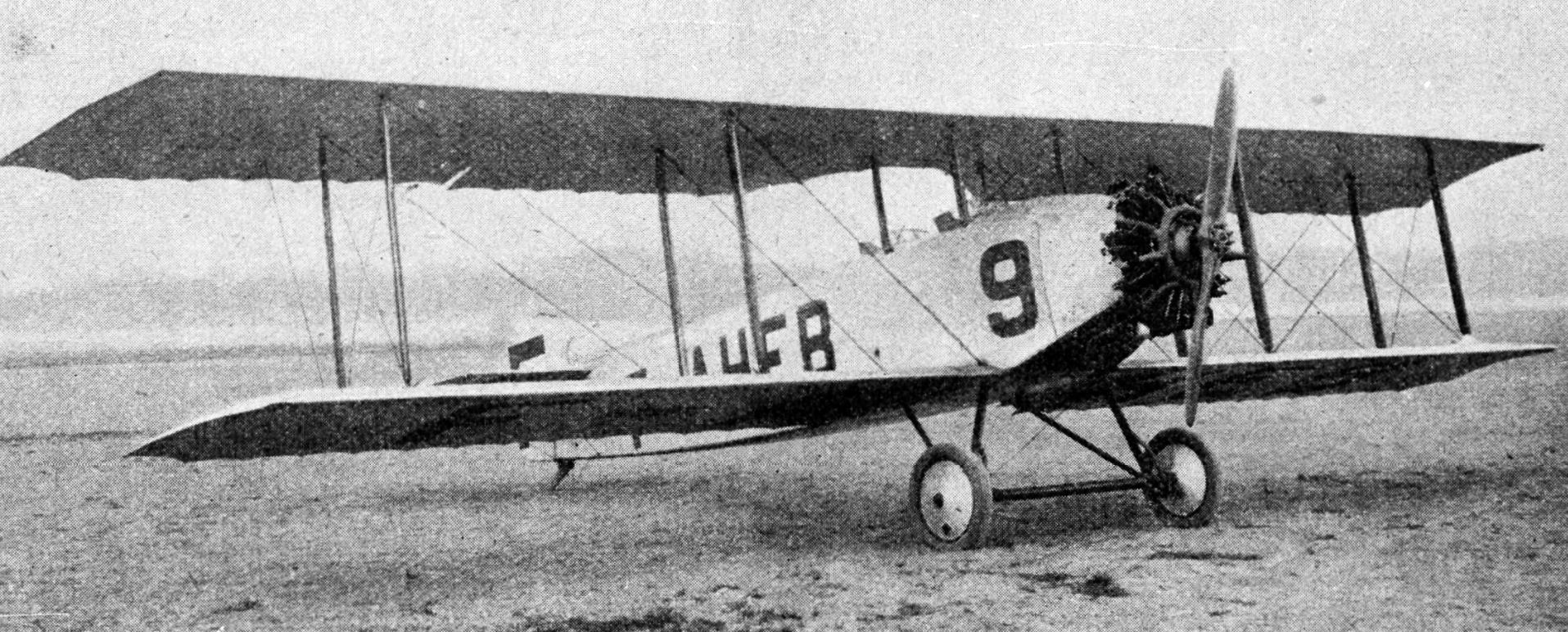
Caudron C.128 photo from L'Aérophile, January 1926

C.27
Original aircraft with 80 hp (60 kW) Le Rhône 9C. 70–80 hp (52–60 kW) Anzani engines were also fitted.
C.125
As C.27/127 but with 130 hp (97 kW) Clerget 9B engine.
C.127
Original type redesignated with only minor changes, same Le Rhône 9C engine.
C.128
As C.27/127 but with 120 hp (89 kW) Salmson 9AC engine and greater span. Some were three seaters, with a third cockpit a little further aft.

== Specifications (C.127) ==
Data from Hauet (2001) pp.188-9

General characteristics

- Crew: Two
- Length: 8.30 m (27 ft 3 in)
- Wingspan: 12.00 m (39 ft 4 in)
- Height: 2.83 m (9 ft 3 in)
- Wing area: 34.50 m^{2} (371.4 sq ft)
- Empty weight: 510 kg (1,124 lb)
- Gross weight: 794 kg (1,750 lb)
- Fuel capacity: 107 kg (236 lb)
- Powerplant: 1 × Le Rhône 9C 9-cylinder air-cooled rotary, 60 kW (80 hp)
- Propellers: 2-bladed

Performance

- Maximum speed: 132 km/h (82 mph, 71 kn)
- Stall speed: 50 km/h (31 mph, 27 kn)
- Service ceiling: 4,000 m (13,000 ft)
- Wing loading: 23.0 kg/m^{2} (4.7 lb/sq ft)
