= Caudron C.680 =

1930s French aircraft

C.680
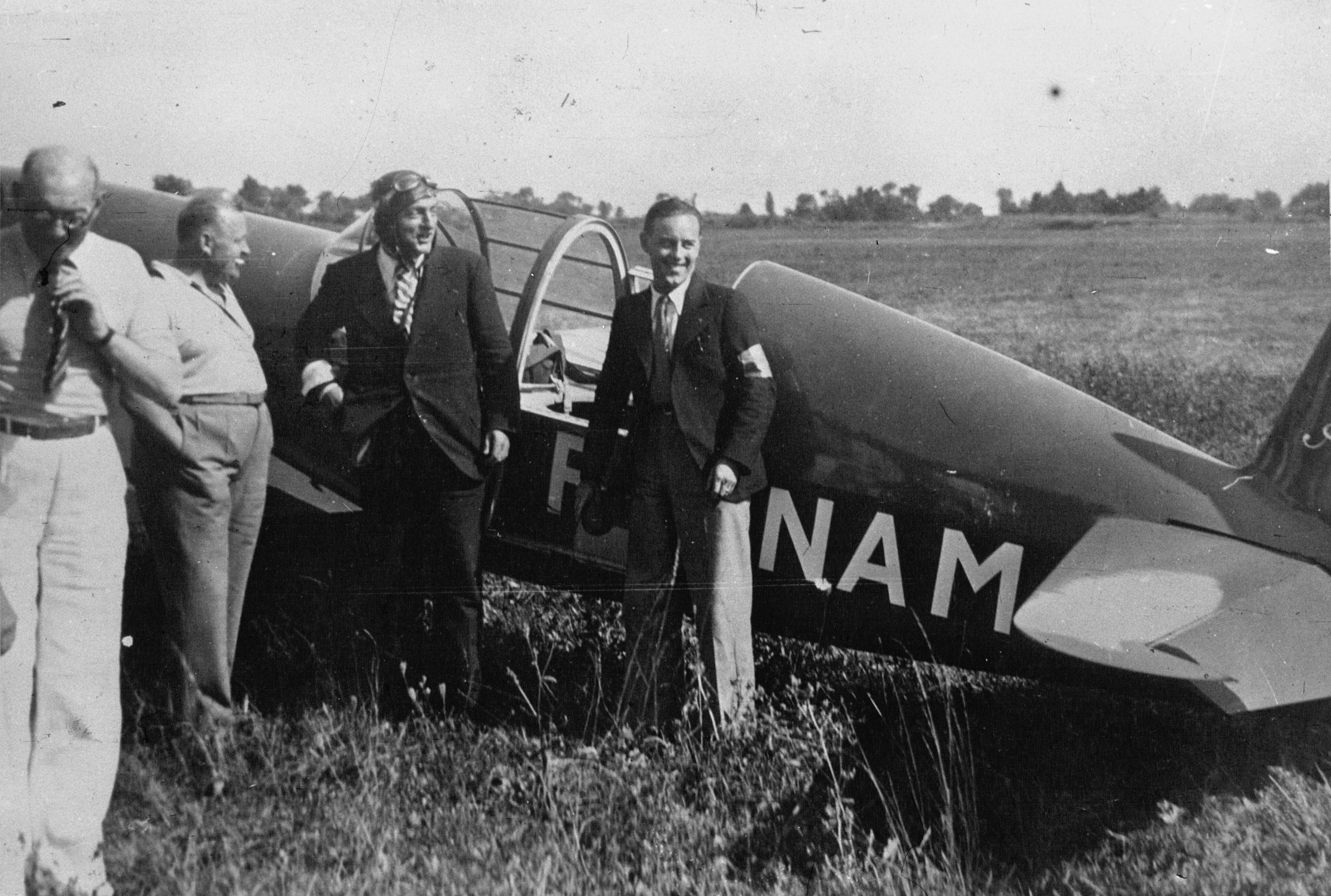
- Maurice Arnoux with his C.680 in July 1936.

General information
- Type: Sports aircraft
- Manufacturer: Caudron
- Number built: 1

History
- First flight: 1936

The Caudron C.680 was a 2-seat sport aircraft built by Caudron in the late 1930s.

== Design ==
The C.680 was a low-wing monoplane of all-wood construction, with the airframe covered by canvas and plywood.

== Specifications ==
Data from

General characteristics

- Crew: 2
- Length: 7.07 m (23 ft 2 in)
- Wingspan: 7.7 m (25 ft 3 in)
- Wing area: 9 m^{2} (97 sq ft)
- Powerplant: 1 × Renault 4Pei 4-cylinder inverted in-line piston engine, 100 kW (140 hp)

Performance
