= Caudron C.101 =

1920s French reconnaissance aircraft

- Caudron C.104 G.R.

General information
- Type: Reconnaissance aircraft
- National origin: France
- Manufacturer: Caudron
- Designer: André Brunet

History
- First flight: 1925

The Caudron C.101 and its variants, the C.103, C.104 and C.107 were French two seat reconnaissance aircraft flown from 1925, differing in their engines.

== Design and development ==
The C.101 was designed to be a deep reconnaissance aircraft with the performance of contemporary fighters and able to carry some offensive weapons. The military classification was Grandes Raids (G.R.) (English: major flights). It was a wooden single bay sesquiplane with strongly outward leaning interplane struts. A tandem pair of inverse V-form cabane struts supported the upper wing over the fuselage. In plan both upper and lower fabric covered wings were rectangular apart from angled tips and a semi-circular cut-out in the upper trailing edge to improve the pilot's upward view. The lower wings were almost a 63% scaled copy of the upper ones, with the same aspect ratio. There were ailerons on the upper wings only.

The four different versions had engines of three different configurations, two water-cooled V-12 engines and two radial engines, one a single row nine cylinder, air-cooled unit and the other an eighteen-cylinder, water-cooled in-line radial engine. Although they were all in the 313–373 kW (420–500 hp) power range, their layouts required very different cowlings and resulted in a range of lengths. Otherwise the C.101-7 variants all had the same dimensions, though the weights varied. They all were fitted with two way radio and had generous fuel capacity for a good range; the tank of the C.103 at least could be released in an emergency to prevent it catching fire.

The pilot's open cockpit was under the wing cut-out; the observer sat close behind in a cockpit equipped with twin machine guns on a Scarff ring type mounting. The fin of the C.101 was triangular and broad chord and the rudder had a straight, vertical edge which extended down to the keel. As the rectangular plan tailplane was mounted on top of the fuselage, the balanced, overhung elevators had a cut-out for rudder movement. The C.101 had a fixed tailwheel undercarriage, with its mainwheels on a single axle which was sprung from V-form struts.

The Caudron C.101 was probably first flown in the first half of 1925 as test pilot Bécheler completed its official testing in that August. Even though the output of the Salmson engine, the most powerful of the set, was 19% more than that of the Gnome-Rhône, the maximum speed at ground level of the C.107 was only 4% more than that of the C.104. The two 336 kW (450 hp) V-12 engines in the C.101 and C.103 produced speeds of 227 km/h (141 mph) and 218 km/h (135 mph) respectively, the former faster than the more powerful C.107 and the latter only slightly faster than the lowest powered C.104.

The Caudron C.104 was displayed at the 10th Paris Salon in December 1926. As well as the observer's guns, visible in images of the C.101, C.104 and drawings of the C.107, two more machine gun positions were noted: one fixed, forward firing synchronised pair controlled by the pilot and another single gun aimed by the observer through his cockpit floor. There was internal provision for twelve 10 kg (22 lb) bombs. Since these arms were required by the military specification, they were probably shared by the other variants.

The number of airframes built is not certain; there is only photographic evidence of the C.101 and C.104 and these may have shared the same airframe. Only the C.101 appeared, as F-ESAI, on the French civil aircraft register.

== Variants ==
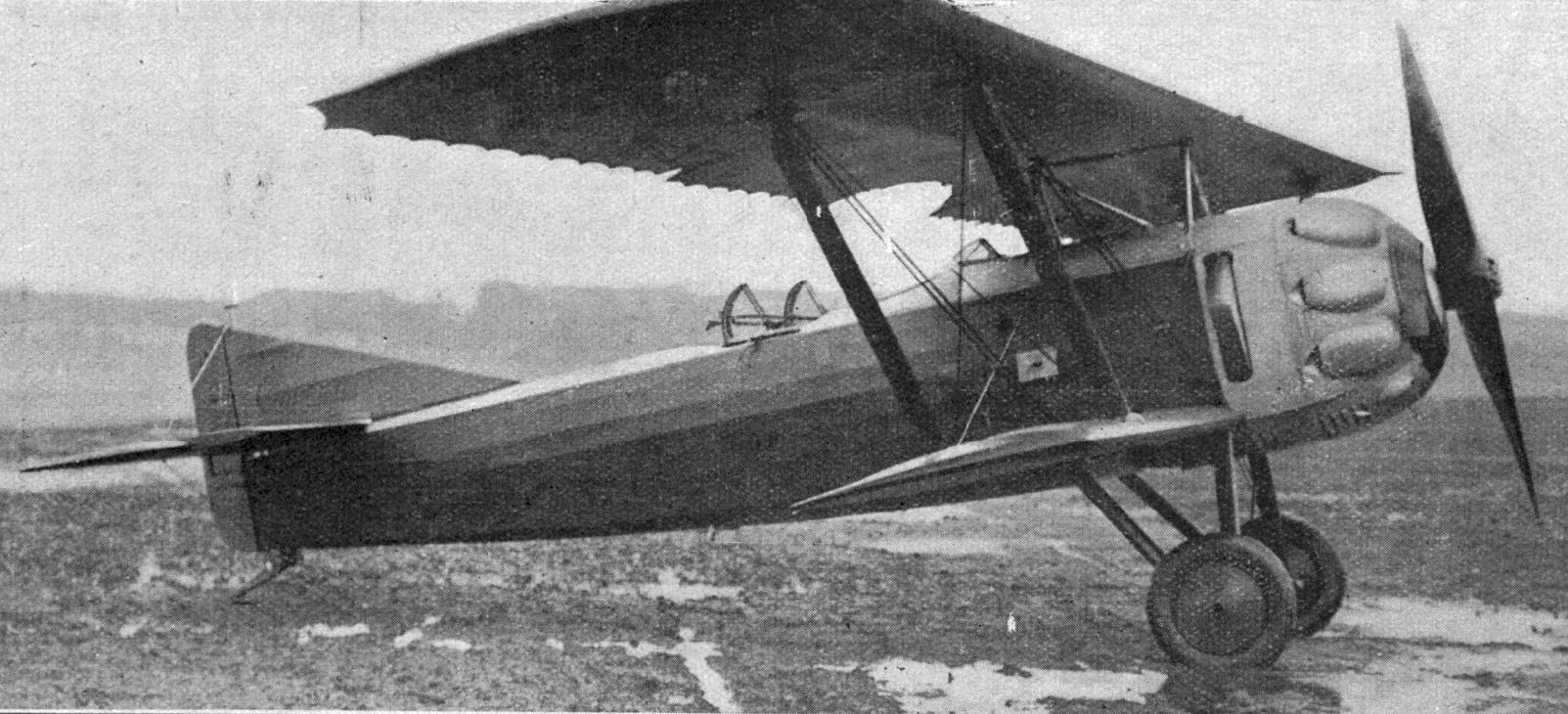
Caudron C.107 photo from L'Aéronautique December,1926

Data from Hauet (2001) pp. 194–5

Caudron C.101
336 kW (450 hp) Hispano-Suiza 12H upright water-cooled V-12. Maximum speed at ground level 227 km/h (141 mph).
Caudron C.103
336 kW (450 hp) Lorraine 12Db water-cooled V-12. Maximum speed at ground level 218 km/h (135 mph).
Caudron C.104
313 kW (420 hp) Gnome-Rhône 9Ab Jupiter air-cooled 9-cylinder radial engine. Maximum speed at ground level 213.5 km/h (132.7 mph)
Caudron C.107
373 kW (500 hp) Salmson 18CMb water-cooled 18-cylinder radial engine. Maximum speed at ground level 223 km/h (139 mph)

== Specifications (C.101) ==
Data from Hauet (2001) pp.194-5

General characteristics

- Crew: Two
- Length: 9.10 m (29 ft 10 in)
- Upper wingspan: 14.56 m (47 ft 9 in)
- Height: 3.27 m (10 ft 9 in)
- Wing area: 42 m^{2} (450 sq ft)
- Empty weight: 1,209 kg (2,665 lb)
- Gross weight: 2,097 kg (4,623 lb)
- Powerplant: 1 × Hispano-Suiza 12H water-cooled upright V-12, 340 kW (450 hp)
- Propellers: 2-bladed

Performance

- Maximum speed: 227 km/h (141 mph, 123 kn) at ground level
- Range: 600 km (370 mi, 320 nmi)
- Service ceiling: 6,750 m (22,150 ft)
- Time to altitude: 3.25 min to 1,000 m (3,281 ft)
