= Caudron G.2 =

1914 single-engined French biplane

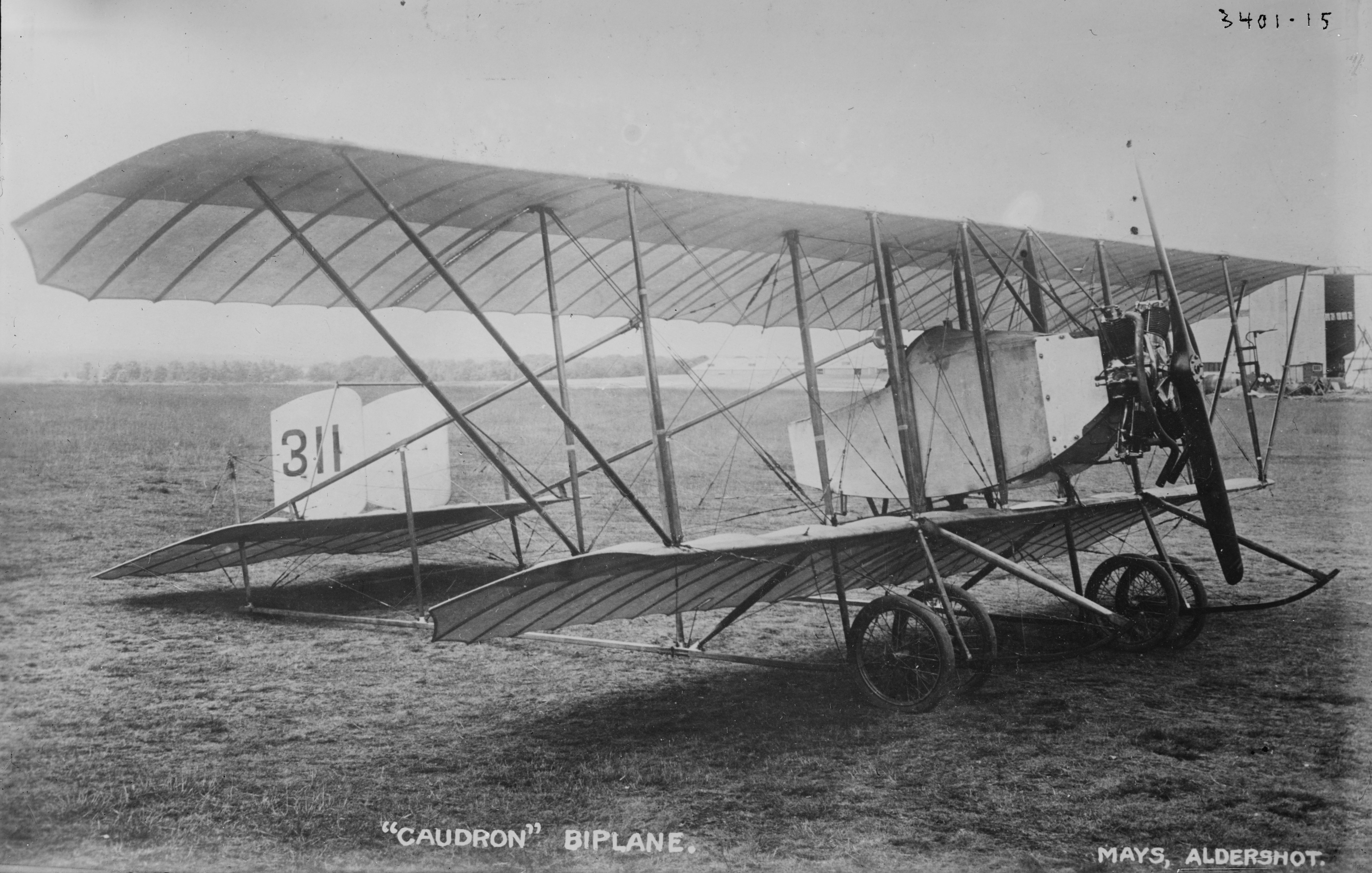

General information
- Type: Trainer aircraft
- Manufacturer: Caudron
- Primary users: Aéronautique Militaire Australian Flying Corps; Royal Naval Air Service
- Number built: 10

History
- Introduction date: 1914
- First flight: Late 1913
- Developed from: Caudron Type G
- Variant: Caudron G.3

The Caudron G.2 was a single-engined French biplane built by Caudron, used in World War I as a reconnaissance aircraft and trainer.

== Development ==
The outbreak of World War I precipitated the need for military applications of the successful Caudron Type G, leading to the creation of the G.2. The Caudron G.2 had a short crew nacelle, with a single engine in the nose of the nacelle, and an open tailboom truss. It was of sesquiplane layout, and used wing warping for lateral control. The wings of the Caudron had scalloped trailing edges that were to become a trademark of the aircraft.

== Operational history ==
Ten Caudron G.2s were produced, with five being assigned to Escadrille Caudron Monoplace 39, four being delivered to the Australian Flying Corps, and one going to the Royal Naval Air Service.

== Specifications ==
Data from French aircraft of the First World War

General characteristics

- Crew: 1 or 2
- Length: 7.25 m (23 ft 9 in)
- Wingspan: 12.1 m (39 ft 8 in)
- Wing area: 28 m^{2} (300 sq ft)
- Gross weight: 400 kg (882 lb)
- Powerplant: 1 × Gnome Monosoupape 9 Type B 9-cylinder air-cooled rotary piston engine\, 60 kW (80 hp)
- Propellers: 2-bladed fixed-pitch propeller

Performance

- Maximum speed: 106 km/h (66 mph, 57 kn)
- Rate of climb: 2.76 m/s (543 ft/min)

== See also ==
Related development

- Caudron G.3
- Caudron R.4
- Caudron R.11
