= Caudron C.99 =

Military Aircraft

General information
- Type: Reconnaissance aircraft
- National origin: France
- Manufacturer: Caudron
- Designer: Brunet
- Number built: 1

History
- First flight: c.1924

The Caudron C.99 was a French light bomber and reconnaissance aircraft. The only example flew with different engines in the mid-1920s.

== Design and development ==
Though in 1924 Flight described the C.99, which was on display at the 18th Paris Salon, as a fighter, both contemporary and modern French sources term it an observation and long range reconnaissance aircraft. It was a conventional single engine tractor biplane with two open cockpits in tandem. Its unequal span wings were rectangular in plan and were mounted without stagger, divided into two bays on each side by two pairs of parallel interplane struts. Cabane struts supported the upper wing over the fuselage.

The C.99 had a steel frame engine mounting in the nose, designed to accept a variety of engines. At the 1924 Salon it had a 450 hp (336 kW) Hispano-Suiza 12H water cooled V-12 engine but it was also seen with a 300 hp (224 kW) water cooled Fiat engine and a 400 hp (298 kW) Lorraine-Dietrich was another possibility. The forward seat was just behind the wing trailing edge and the second close behind. There was a triangular fin which carried a rudder with a straight and upright edge. This extended to the keel so the elevators, attached to a tailplane mounted on top of the fuselage, required a central cut-out for movement. The C.99 had a fixed undercarriage with its mainwheels on a single axle mounted on V-struts from each side of the fuselage.

As a bomber, the C.99 could carry twelve 10 kg (22 lb) bombs. At the Salon it was fitted with four machine guns, one fixed and forward-firing for the pilot and two on a Scarff ring for the observer in the rear cockpit, who also had the fourth, rearward firing, gun in his floor.

== Specifications (Hispano engine) ==
Data from Hauet (2001), p.187

General characteristics

- Crew: Two
- Length: 9.70 m (31 ft 10 in)
- Upper wingspan: 14.00 m (45 ft 11 in)
- Lower wingspan: 12.73 m (41 ft 9 in)
- Height: 3.25 m (10 ft 8 in)
- Wing area: 48.0 m^{2} (517 sq ft)
- Empty weight: 1,185 kg (2,612 lb) with coolant
- Gross weight: 1,830 kg (4,034 lb)
- Fuel capacity: 255 kg (562 lb)
- Powerplant: 1 × Hispano 12H V-12 engine, 340 kW (450 hp)
- Propellers: 2-bladed

Performance

- Maximum speed: 200 km/h (120 mph, 110 kn)
- Endurance: 3.50 hr
