= Caudron C.570 =

French aircraft

C.570 Kangourou

General information
- Type: Bomber/military transport
- National origin: France
- Manufacturer: Caudron-Renault
- Number built: 1

History
- First flight: 24 November 1935

The Caudron C.570 was a French twin-engine aircraft designed and built by Caudron in the mid-1930s. It was designed to function in multiple roles; as a bomber, passenger transport, paratroop aircraft, cargo aircraft and air ambulance.

== Design ==
The Caudron C.570 was primarily designed to fill a gap in the types of aircraft available to French armed forces, that of a troop-carrier, though it could take on other roles. It was a low wing cantilever monoplane with wings in three parts, a 7.80 m (25 ft 7 in) span rectangular centre section and outer trapezoidal panels, ending in rounded tips. The wings were built around twin box spars made of spruce and plywood. The central section had an aluminium frame and light metal skin; the outer panels were ply-covered. Multi-section ailerons filled more than half the span of the outer panels' trailing edges.

The C.570 had a square section fuselage. Its 7.80 m (25 ft 7 in)-long forward part, reaching aft to the wing trailing edges, housed the crew and up to eighteen troops and was built with aluminium longerons and frames, skinned in light alloy. There was a cabin in the nose for a crew-member who acted as navigator, bomb aimer and second pilot and behind that, ahead the engines, a well glazed pilot's cabin with side-by-side seating. Immediately behind the pilot was a cabin for the wireless operator and also four passengers. Next came the main cabin, which seated fourteen men and finally a small cabin for any injured. The distribution of the crew may have depended on the designated role, e.g. transport or bomber, as Flight describes a different arrangement. Access to the forward cabins was via a large port-side door. The main cabin had another large door on the starboard side at the rear; there was also a trapdoor large enough for four parachutists to leave together. The rear part of the fuselage was a welded chrome-molybdenum steel tube girder, fabric covered over a light wooden frame.

It was powered by two 520 kW (700 hp) water-cooled Renault 18Jbr 18-cylinder W engines, mounted on welded steel tubes in the wing centre section with radiators below them. The C.570's hydraulically retractable main undercarriage had wheels on Messier oleo struts which folded backwards behind the engines, giving it a track of 7.80 m (25 ft 7 in).

The C.570 had a twin tail with its tailplane mounted at the top of the fuselage. Together with the elevators it was trapezoidal in plan; the fins were of the endplate type, oval in profile and with rudders split into two sections to allow elevator movement. Both horizontal and vertical control surfaces had Flettner-type servo tabs. Below the tail was a fixed tailwheel.

== Development ==
The C.570 flew for the first time, with pilots Delmotte and Lacombe and engineer Marcel Riffard, on 24 November 1935. By July 1936 it was undergoing official tests at Villcaoublay. In November it appeared there amongst an array of prototypes and its prolonged trials were only ended in September 1937, by when it had acquired the name Kangourou.

== Specifications ==
Data from Les Ailes 26 March 1936

General characteristics

- Length: 19.36 m (63 ft 6 in)
- Wingspan: 29.00 m (95 ft 2 in)
- Height: 4.60 m (15 ft 1 in)
- Wing area: 110 m^{2} (1,200 sq ft)
- Empty weight: 5,670 kg (12,500 lb)
- Gross weight: 10,100 kg (22,267 lb)
- Powerplant: 2 × Renault 18Jbr water-cooled 18-cylinder W engine, 520 kW (700 hp) each nominal, equivalent 1,240 kW (1,660 hp)
- Propellers: 2-bladed

Performance

- Maximum speed: 270 km/h (170 mph, 150 kn) at ground level
- Range: 1,100 km (680 mi, 590 nmi) into 50 km/h (31 mph) headwind
- Landing speed: 90 km/h (56 mph) with flaps down
