= Caudron C.490 =

Trainer aircraft

C.490

General information
- Type: Trainer aircraft
- Manufacturer: Caudron
- Number built: 7

History
- First flight: September 1935
- Developed from: Caudron C.159

The Caudron C.490 was a trainer aircraft built by Caudron in the mid 1930s.

== Design ==
The C.490 was a biplane of all-wood construction with the airframe covered by canvas, derived from the Caudron C.159.

== Specifications ==
Data from

General characteristics

- Crew: 2
- Length: 8.6 m (28 ft 3 in)
- Wingspan: 10.23 m (33 ft 7 in)
- Height: 2.55 m (8 ft 4 in)
- Wing area: 26 m^{2} (280 sq ft)
- Empty weight: 622 kg (1,371 lb)
- Gross weight: 1,000 kg (2,205 lb)
- Powerplant: 1 × Renault 4Pfi 4-cylinder inverted air-cooled in-line piston engine, 130 kW (170 hp)

Performance

- Maximum speed: 180 km/h (110 mph, 97 kn)
- Range: 450 km (280 mi, 240 nmi)
- Service ceiling: 5,000 m (16,000 ft)
