= Caudron C.220 =

Two-seat French biplane trainer

General information
- Type: Trainer aircraft
- National origin: France
- Manufacturer: Caudron
- Designer: Paul Deville
- Number built: 2

History
- First flight: 1929

The Caudron C.220 was a two-seat French biplane trainer. Only two were built, using different engines.

== Design and development ==
The Caudron C.220 basic trainer was a single bay biplane with two pairs of parallel interplane struts aided by wire bracing and two pairs of parallel cabane struts between the upper wing and the upper fuselage longerons. The wings were rectangular in plan and of similar chord though the upper span was about 3% greater. The wings were built from spruce and fabric covered. Ailerons were carried on the lower wing only.

The C.220 was powered by a 71 kW (95 hp) Salmson 7AC seven cylinder radial engine driving a metal, two blade propeller. One photograph shows the engine uncowled though the second aircraft, the C.221, which had a 75 kW (100 hp) Lorraine 5P five cylinder radial and was otherwise identical apart from using a different make of propeller, was recorded both with and without a narrow chord Townend ring type cowling. Behind the engine the fuselage was a box girder structure covered in plywood, though the upper decking was rounded. The forward of the two open tandem cockpits was placed between the wings at about mid-chord with the rear seat behind the trailing edge. The C.220 had a triangular fin and an unbalanced rudder with straight, parallel side and rounded top and bottom. The horizontal tail was fixed to the upper fuselage longerons. There was a fixed, tail wheel undercarriage.

The C.220 first flew in 1929. In July 1931 it was successfully presented at the military testing centre at Villacoublay, along with two other intermediate trainer candidates, both monoplanes, the successful Hanriot LH.10 and the Morane-Saulnier MS.311.

== Variants ==
C.220
71 kW (95 hp) Salmson 7AC 7-cylinder radial engine, Chauvière metal propeller.
C.221
75 kW (100 hp) Lorraine 5P 5-cylinder radial engine, Levasseur metal propeller. Otherwise as C.220.

== Specifications (C.220) ==
Data from Hauet (2001) pp.214-5

General characteristics

- Crew: Two, pupil and instructor
- Length: 7.795 m (25 ft 7 in)
- Upper wingspan: 9.90 m (32 ft 6 in)
- Lower wingspan: 9.62 m (31 ft 7 in)
- Height: 2.83 m (9 ft 3 in)
- Wing area: 24.23 m^{2} (260.8 sq ft)
- Gross weight: 830 kg (1,830 lb)
- Fuel capacity: 80 kg (176 lb)
- Powerplant: 1 × Salmson 7AC radial, 71 kW (95 hp) 95 cv
- Propellers: 2-bladed Chauvière, metal

Performance

- Maximum speed: 140 km/h (87 mph, 76 kn) at sea level
- Stall speed: 82 km/h (51 mph, 44 kn)
- Time to altitude: 1,000 m (3,280 ft) in 6' 25"
- Take-off distance: 125 m (410 ft)
- Landing distance: 105 m (344 ft)
