= Caudron C.92 =

1920s French aircraft

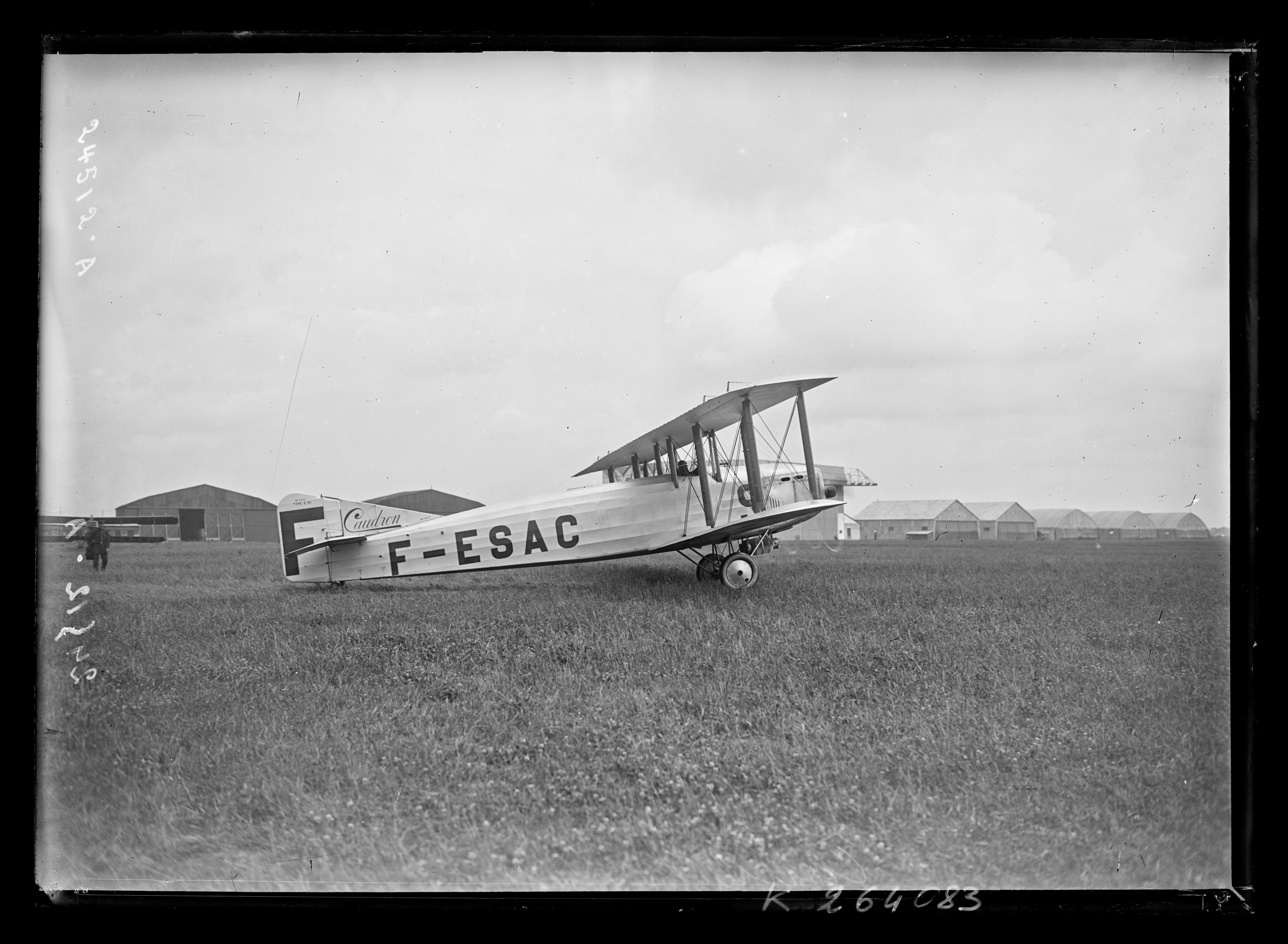
- The C.92 in July 1925

General information
- Type: Airliner
- National origin: France
- Manufacturer: Caudron
- Number built: 1

History
- First flight: 1925

The Caudron C.92 was a passenger transport built by Caudron in 1925, powered by a 370 hp (280 kW) Lorraine-Dietrich 12D. Only one was built, and it was discarded in July 1934.

== Design and development ==
The C.92, first flown in 1925, was a close but more powerful relative of the C.91 from 1924. It was a two bay biplane with pairs of upright, parallel interplane struts between its wings, which were rectangular plan out to angled tips. The upper wing was supported centrally on four short cabane struts. The lower wing had a slightly shorter span, 10% smaller chord and, unlike the upper wing, had light dihedral. Only the upper wing carried ailerons. Structurally, the wings were built from spruce and plywood.

Its 370 hp (280 kW) liquid-cooled upright V-12 Lorraine-Dietrich 12D was neatly cowled in the nose, with twin cylindrical Lamblin radiators externally mounted below it. Behind the engine the fuselage was flat-sided with a rectangular section, starting with a 1.3 m^{3} (46 cu ft) baggage space. Above it, the pilot and navigator sat side by side in open cockpits. The passenger cabin behind the baggage space accommodated four, each with their own windows and electric heating. Entry was via a port side door.

The tail of the C.92 was conventional, with a tailplane on the top of the fuselage and generous elevators of similar plan as the wings apart from an elevator cut-out for rudder movement. Its long vertical tail had a blunted triangular profile and a rudder that extended to the keel.

Its fixed, conventional landing gear had a track of 1,050 mm (41 in). The axle was bungee cord-sprung to a pair of vertical landing legs, each braced with a V-strut. Its wooden tailskid was also bungee sprung.

Very little is known about its history, though a photograph taken before the end of 1925 shows it marked "9" as if for a contest.

== Specifications ==
Data from Les Ailes 1925

General characteristics

- Crew: two
- Capacity: four passengers
- Length: 12.49 m (41 ft 0 in)
- Upper wingspan: 16.55 m (54 ft 4 in)
- Lower wingspan: 15.53 m (50 ft 11 in)
- Height: 3.93 m (12 ft 11 in)
- Wing area: 65 m^{2} (700 sq ft)
- Empty weight: 1,606 kg (3,541 lb)
- Gross weight: 2,648 kg (5,838 lb)
- Powerplant: 1 × Lorraine-Dietrich 12D liquid-cooled V-12, 280 kW (370 hp)
- Propellers: 2-bladed

Performance

- Maximum speed: 180 km/h (110 mph, 97 kn) at ground level
- Cruise speed: 152 km/h (94 mph, 82 kn)
- Range: 1,100 km (700 mi, 610 nmi)
- Maximum glide ratio: 19.2:100 engine off
- Time to altitude: 7 min 40 s to 1,000 m (3,300 ft)
