= Caudron C.68 =

Two-seat French training and touring aircraft

General information
- Type: Touring and sport aircraft
- National origin: France
- Manufacturer: Caudron
- Designer: Paul Deville
- Number built: 6

History
- First flight: 1922
- Developed from: Caudron C.67

The Caudron C.68 was a two-seat French training and touring aircraft, built in the early 1920s, which attracted interest at the time because of its simple and fast wing folding arrangement. Only a few were produced.

== Design and development ==
Apart from its folding wings, the C.68 was a conventional single bay biplane with rectangular plan wings of similar span, mounted without stagger. Ailerons were fitted only on the upper wings. The outer interplane struts were in parallel pairs and the upper wing was supported over the fuselage on four upright cabane struts. The forward pair of these were unusual in extending down to the lower fuselage longerons and in being split vertically; the inner halves linked the centre section and fuselage and the outer halves were extra interplane struts. To fold the wings a short section of the centre section trailing edge was folded back to make room for the part of the upper wing aft of its hinge and the lower, outer, normally concealed part of the cabane/interplane strut swung out of its slot in the fuselage. The rear part of the lower wing cleared the fuselage underside. The aileron cables ran within the wing and did not need to be disconnected for folding thanks to wires that prevented them slackening.

The C.68 was powered by a 37 kW (50 hp) Anzani 6-cylinder two row radial engine, mounted without a cowling and driving a two blade propeller. Behind the engine the fuselage was flat sided, though the underside had a curved profile and there was curved upper decking. It had two open cockpits, one under the wing and the second just aft of the trailing edge. The C.68's fin was triangular and broad, carrying a vertical edged unbalanced rudder which extended down to the keel. Its tailplane was mounted on top of the fuselage with its elevators notched to allow rudder movement. It had a tailskid undercarriage with its mainwheels on a single 1.40 m (4 ft 7 in) long axle sprung on two V-form struts from the lower fuselage longerons.

Folding and deploying the wings was straightforward and rapid, taking less than four minutes. Folding began by pinning on a tailskid extension to keep the lower wings off the ground. This extension could also link the folded C.68 behind a car for towing. The C.68's folded width was less than its 2.4 m (7 ft 10 in) height.

The C.68 was first flown in 1922 and was on display at the 1922 Paris Salon, which opened on 15 December. Another C.68 was flown to Paris by Becheler who landed it in front of the Grand Palais on 16 December 1922, then gave a demonstration of its folding wings.

Four C.68s appeared on the French Civil Register. In total six C.68s were built, of which a single example survives ad is in airworthy condition.

== Specifications ==
Data from Hauet (2001) pp.172-3

General characteristics

- Crew: Two
- Length: 5.80 m (19 ft 0 in)
- Wingspan: 7.65 m (25 ft 1 in)
- Height: 2.40 m (7 ft 10 in)
- Wing area: 16.00 m^{2} (172.2 sq ft)
- Empty weight: 250 kg (551 lb)
- Gross weight: 480 kg (1,058 lb)
- Fuel capacity: 51 kg (112 lb)
- Powerplant: 1 × Anzani 6-cylinder air-cooled two row radial, 37 kW (50 hp)
- Propellers: 2-bladed

Performance

- Maximum speed: 115 km/h (71 mph, 62 kn)
