= Caudron C.97 =

Two-seat biplane trainer designed and built in France around 1924

General information
- Type: Trainer
- National origin: France
- Manufacturer: Caudron

History
- First flight: early 1924

The Caudron C.97 was a two-seat biplane trainer designed and built in France around 1924. A number were used by the Bolivian Air Force.

== Design and development ==
Rather little information has survived on the C.97. Although it looked very similar to the Caudron C.59 and used the same engine, it is not on a list of eight other Caudron designs which shared the latter's airframe. The C.97 was a two bay biplane without stagger and with pairs of parallel interplane struts and cabane struts. Its fabric covered, unequal span wings were rectangular in plan apart from a large central cut-out over the fuselage to improve upward vision from the rear cockpit. Ailerons were fitted to the upper wing.

Its fuselage was flat sided. An upright, water-cooled Hispano-Suiza 8Ab V-8 engine, a relatively high compression engine developed during World War I as aircraft flew to higher altitudes and so able to cope with the high Andean airfields of Bolivia, sat high in the nose with the fuselage underside curving upwards under it and with a flat fronted, angled cowling above the propeller shaft. Two different radiators were used, one of the cylindrical Lamblin type mounted below the fuselage and the other a shallow but wide rectangular one on the underside. The forward open cockpit was close behind the engine and under the wing, with the instructor's position slightly behind the trailing edge. At the rear the fin was triangular and broad, with a straight edged rudder that reached down to the keel. Since the tailplane was mounted on top of the fuselage, the elevators had a large cut-out for rudder movement.

The C.97 had a fixed tail skid undercarriage with its mainwheels on a single axle sprung from V-form struts to the lower fuselage longerons.

The first flight was probably made in early 1924 as the prototype was registered F-AGBH in April that year. The first Bolivian Air Force machine was delivered on 1 August 1925. The number purchased is not known; L'Aéronautique in 1927 mentions just one but Flight in 1928 says "a number". One C.97 was used from mid-1926 by the French-South American Company, based in Buenos Aires in Argentina. The privately owned F-AGBH flew in France until 1926, taking part in competitions like the 1924 Concours Aviation de Tourisme de l'Aéro-Club de France (aviation touring competition of the French Aéro-Club). It was next owned by the Compagnie Française d'Aviation until about 1930, when it was exported to Argentina.

== Operators ==
Bolivia

- Bolivian Air Force

== Specifications ==
Data from Hauet (2001) p.186

General characteristics

- Crew: Two
- Powerplant: 1 × Hispano-Suiza 8Ab upright water-cooled V-8, 130 kW (180 hp)
- Propellers: 2-bladed

Performance

- Range: 300 km (190 mi, 160 nmi)
- Service ceiling: 6,200 m (20,300 ft)
