= Caudron Type O =

Type O
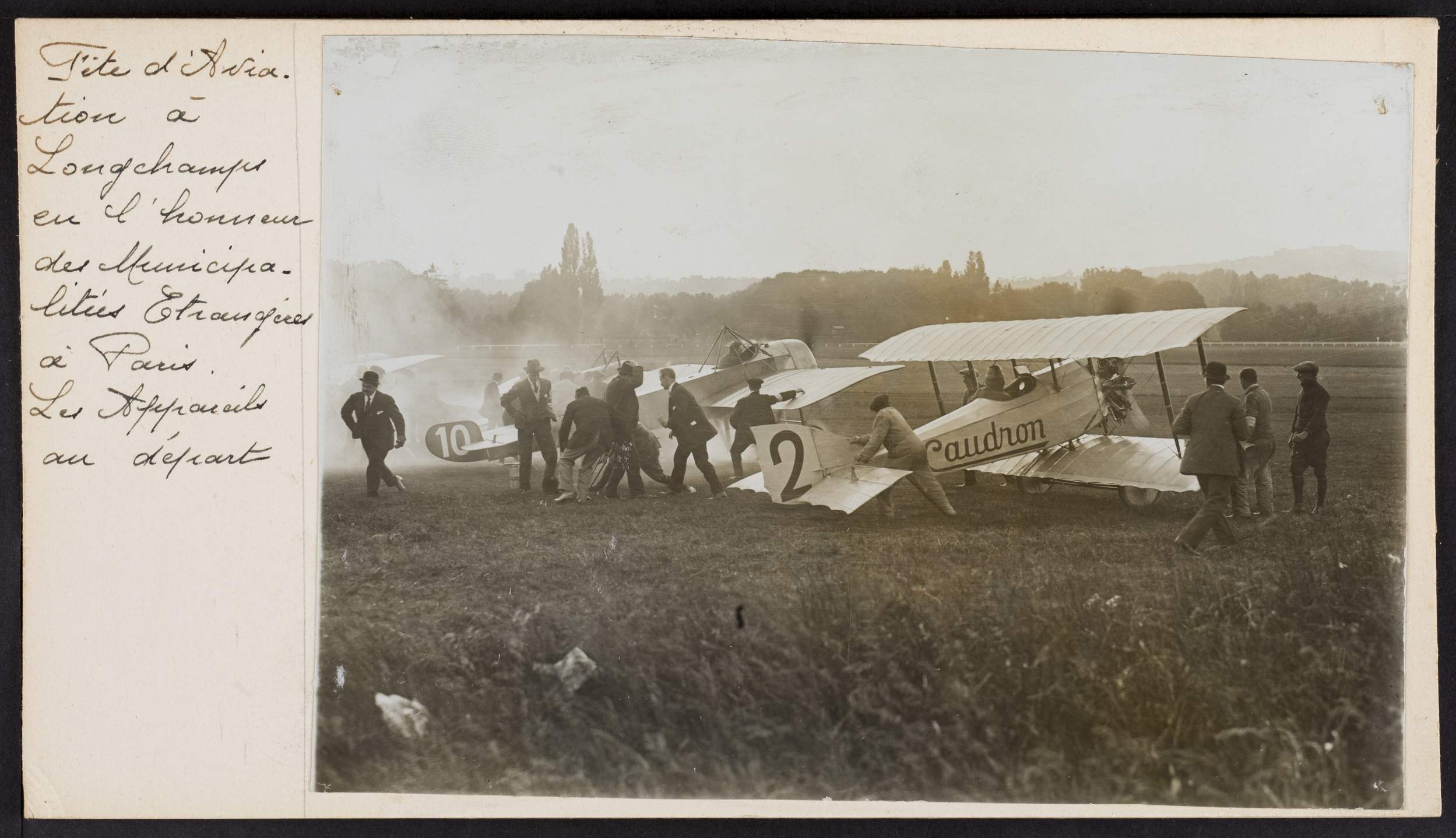
- The Caudron O at the 1914 Fete d'Aviation, held at the Longchamps racecourse, Paris

General information
- Type: Sports aircraft
- National origin: France
- Manufacturer: Caudron
- Designer: Gaston Caudron
- Number built: 1

History
- First flight: January–February 1914

The Caudron Type O was a French single seat air racing biplane first flown in 1914.

== Development ==
The Type O was a single bay biplane with no stagger. Both wings had two wooden spars and were fabric covered. On each side there were two pairs of parallel interplane struts joining the spars, one outboard and the other passing through the fuselage between the centre sections. These placed the upper wing well above the fuselage and the lower one a little below it. The usual crossed diagonal pairs of flying wires braced the bays. The Type O used wing warping rather than ailerons for lateral control.

When it first flew in the early weeks of 1914, it was powered by a semi-cowled Anzani 6-cylinder radial. There were two versions of this engine with different displacements; l'Aérophile states a power output of 45 hp (34 kW), corresponding to the smaller version, but Hauet quotes 50–60 hp (37–45 kW), that of the larger engine. By May 1914 it was flying with an uncowled 100 hp (75 kW) Anzani 10-cylinder radial.

The fuselage was recycled from one of Caudron's earlier monoplanes, the very similar Types M and N, and was built around an ash lattice girder of square section which tapered to the rear. Stringers, stood off from the girder, gave the fabric covered fuselage a more rounded cross-section. An open, single seat cockpit was placed under the wing trailing edge. When it first flew the Type O had an almost square, upright vertical tail with little or no fin and a large rudder reaching down to the keel. The horizontal tail, narrow and with a straight, unswept leading edge was mounted on top of the fuselage so the rudder operated in an elevator cut-out. Later in the year, the aircraft, now with the 100 hp Anzani and a modified upper forward fuselage, had a very different tail with a larger fin which had a long, curving leading edge, its contour continuing into that of a broad, deep rudder. There may also have been wing modifications as well; l'Aéroplane describes the upper and lower wings as having the same span, whereas in Hauet's account the span of the upper wing was the greater.

The Type O had an all-steel tailskid undercarriage, with a pair of spoked mainwheels on split axles hinged from the centre of a transverse rod mounted on four longitudinal V-struts, arranged as an inverted W from the inner, under-fuselage interplane struts. Rubber springs damped the movement of the outer ends and wheels on landing.

== Operational history ==
Early in its life the Type O acquired the nickname of "The soap box". In May 1914, re-engined and with its new tail, it was flown by Chanteloup in a race at the Bois de Boulogne; in June it flew in Vienna. In September, a month after the outbreak of World War I, it was delivered to the military.

== Specifications (100 hp Anzani) ==
Data from Hauet (2001)

General characteristics

- Crew: One
- Length: 5.00 m (16 ft 5 in) ; l'Aérophile gives 7 m (23 ft 0 in)
- Upper wingspan: 7.40 m (24 ft 3 in)
- Lower wingspan: 6.80 m (22 ft 4 in)
- Height: 2.50 m (8 ft 2 in)
- Wing area: 14.50 m^{2} (156.1 sq ft)
- Powerplant: 1 × Anzani two row, 10-cylinder radial, 75 kW (100 hp)
- Propellers: two-bladed

Performance

- Maximum speed: 146 km/h (91 mph, 79 kn)
