= Caudron C.161 =

Lightweight French two-seat biplane

C.161
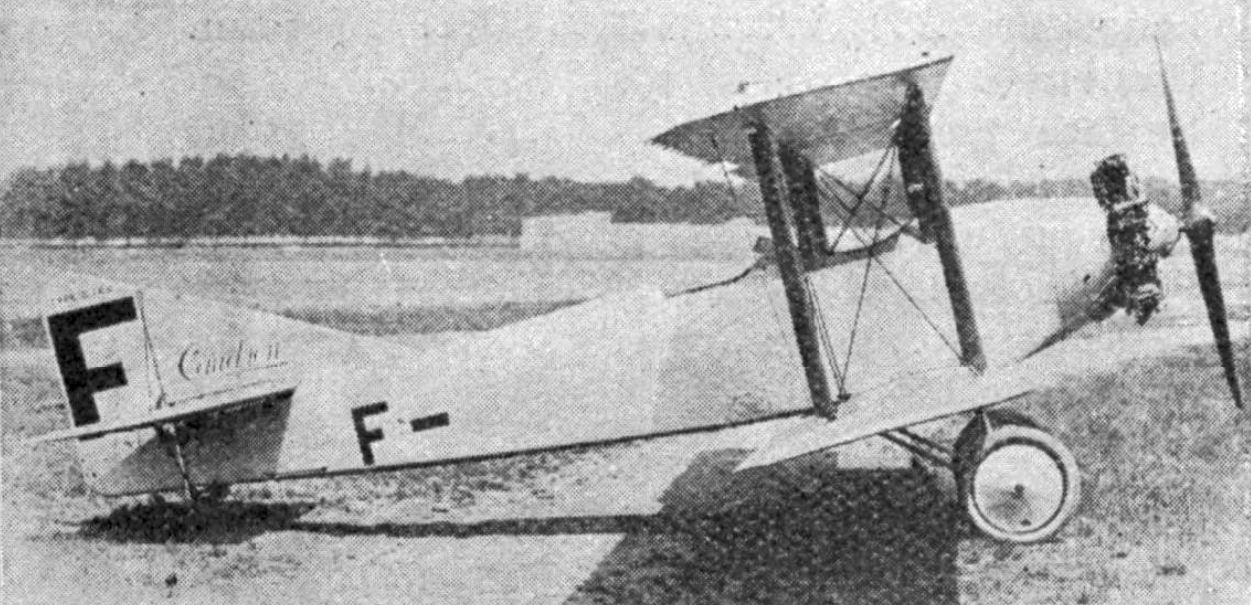
- Caudron C.168

General information
- Type: Sport or training biplane
- National origin: France
- Manufacturer: Caudron

History
- First flight: 1927

The Caudron C.161 was a lightweight French two-seat biplane designed by Caudron for sport or flight training use. A conventional biplane with a square fuselage powered by a 65 hp (48 kW) Salmson radial engine. It had two cockpits in tandem with dual controls in both, when not used as a trainer the controls could be removed from the rear cockpit. A variant, the C.168, with a more powerful 70 hp (52 kW) Anzani radial engine was also available.

== Variants ==
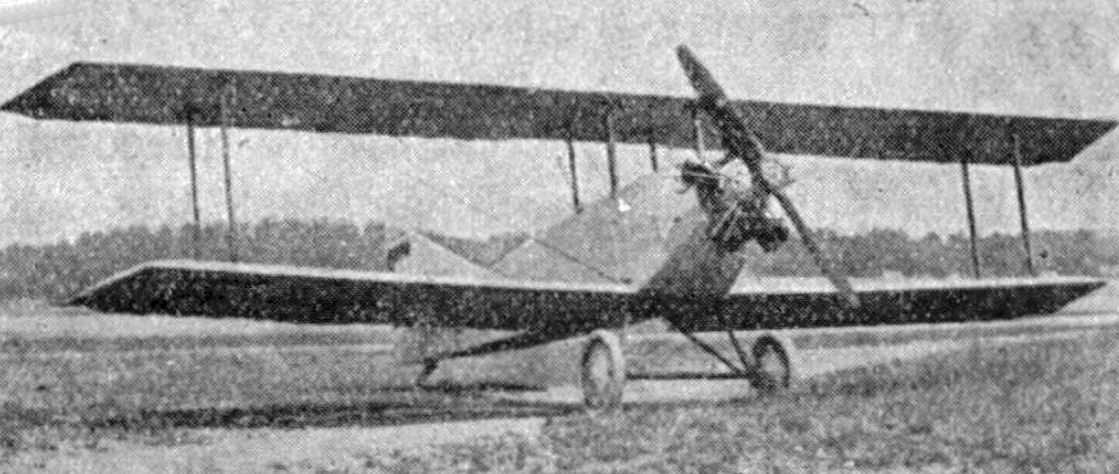
Caudron C.161 photo from L'Air December 1,1926

C.161
Variant with a 65 hp (48 kW) Salmson 5Ac radial engine.
C.168
Variant with a 70 hp (52 kW) Anzani 6-cylinder radial engine.

== Specifications (C.168) ==
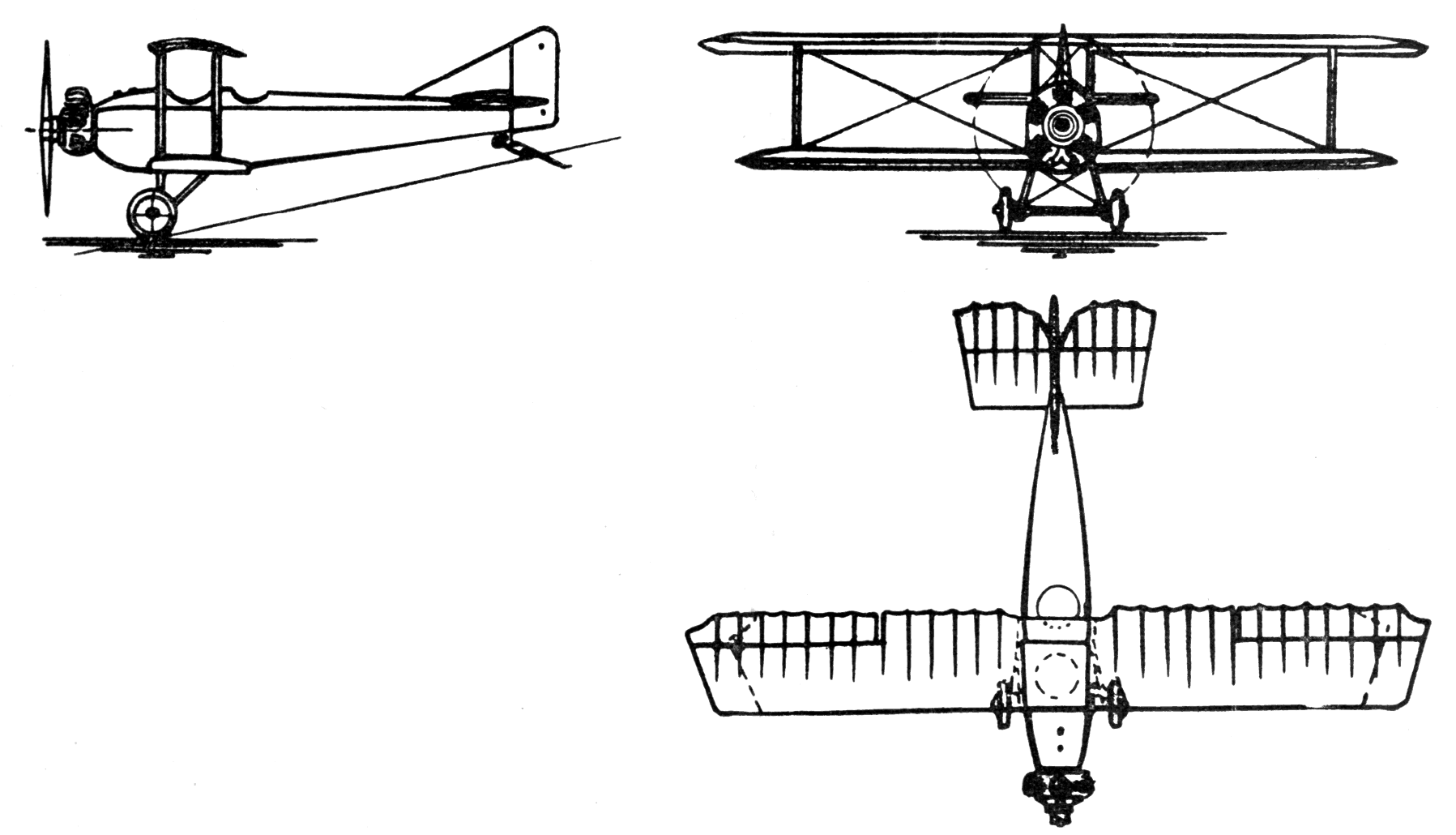
Caudron C.161 3-view drawing from L'Air October 15,1929

Data from The Illustrated Encyclopedia of Aircraft, Jane's all the World's Aircraft 1928

General characteristics

- Crew: 2
- Length: 6.13 m (20 ft 1 in)
- Wingspan: 9 m (29 ft 6 in)
- Height: 2.42 m (7 ft 11 in)
- Wing area: 20 m^{2} (220 sq ft)
- Empty weight: 342 kg (754 lb)
- Gross weight: 572 kg (1,261 lb)
- Powerplant: 1 × Anzani 6-cylinder radial piston engine, 52 kW (70 hp)

Performance

- Maximum speed: 150 km/h (93 mph, 81 kn)
- Wing loading: 28.6 kg/m^{2} (5.9 lb/sq ft)
- Power/mass: 0.0912 kW/kg (0.0555 hp/lb)
