= Caudron C.98 =

French sports/racing aircraft

The Caudron C.98 was a French sports/racing aircraft built by Caudron in the 1920s. Derived from the Caudron C.91, it was powered by a 230 hp Salmson 9 Ab 9-cyl air-cooled radial, and it was intended for the Coupe Zenith race.
