= Caudron C.140 =

1920s French military trainer aircraft

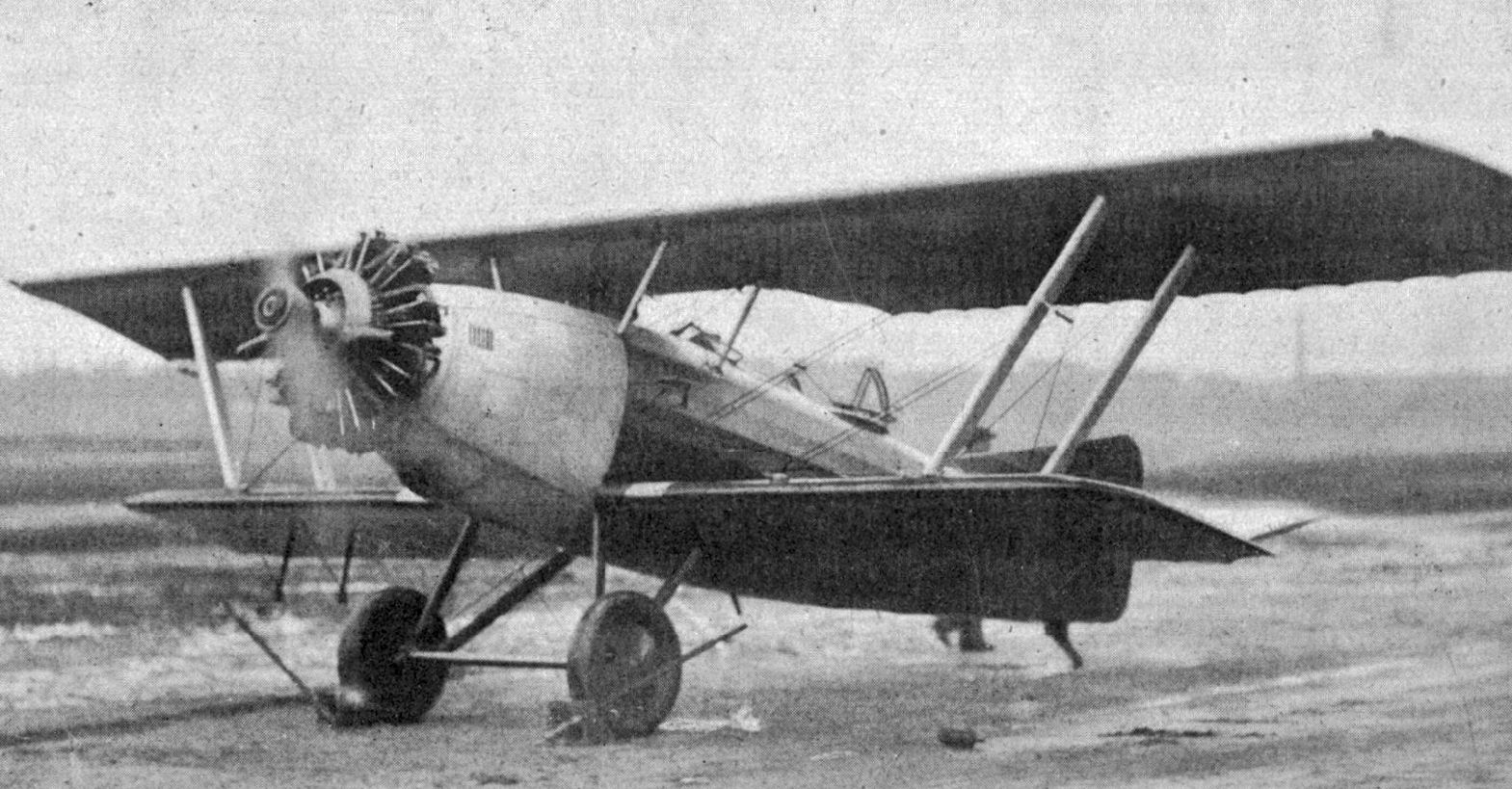

General information
- Type: Liaison and observation and gunnery trainer
- National origin: France
- Manufacturer: Caudron
- Designer: Paul Deville

History
- First flight: Summer 1928

The Caudron C.140 was a French tandem cockpit sesquiplane designed in 1928 as a combination of liaison aircraft and observer and gunnery trainer.

== Design and development ==
The C.140 was designed in the first half of 1928 to meet a French military call for a multi-purpose aircraft that could train pilots and gunners in gunnery and in photographic and radio reconnaissance work as well as fulfilling a liaison role.

It was a single bay, markedly unequal span biplane or sesquiplane. The upper wing was in three parts, with easily detachable, rectangular plan outer panels joined to a central panel which included a broad cut-out over the fuselage to enhance the upward view from the tandem cockpits. The lower wings were similar but with the lower fuselage in place of the central panel. Both wings had two drawn, rectangular section duralumin tube spars drilled for lightness, wooden ribs and round duralumin tube internal drag struts. Parallel pairs of outward-leaning interplane struts, again of round tubular duralumin, linked upper and lower wing spars aided by wire bracing. Similar parallel pairs of outward-leaning cabane struts joined the central panel to the upper fuselage longerons. There was no stagger or dihedral.

The C.140 was powered by an uncowled 172 kW (230 hp) Salmson 9AB nine cylinder radial engine, mounted on duralumin bearers. In the case of a fire, the 200 L (44 imp gal; 53 US gal) fuel tank could be jettisoned in flight. Behind the engine the fuselage was of mixed construction and a deep oval in section, with multiple longitudinal members. The pilot sat in the forward, open cockpit under the rear of the wing, with the observer close behind, about halfway to the tail, where there was a shallow triangular fin with a parallel edged rudder with a tip continuing the upper fin line and a lower edge reaching to the keel. The small tailplane was rectangular in plan and carried larger area, overhanging balanced elevators with a small cut-out for rudder movement. The C.140 had a tail skid undercarriage with its main wheels on a single axle, sprung to two sets of steel V-struts from the lower wing root.

For gunnery training the pilot had a camera-gun and the observer a pair of Lewis machine guns. The observer also had a wide-angle camera for photographic reconnaissance and radio equipment for immediate reporting. The C.140 was equipped for night flying.

The C.140 first flew in the summer of 1928. It did not go into series production.

== Specifications ==
Data from Jane's all the World's Aircraft 1928, Aviafrance:C-140

General characteristics

- Crew: Two
- Length: 7.84 m (25 ft 9 in)
- Upper wingspan: 11.3 m (37 ft 1 in)
- Lower wingspan: 7.87 m (25 ft 10 in)
- Height: 3.2 m (10 ft 6 in)
- Wing area: 28 m^{2} (300 sq ft)
- Empty weight: 896 kg (1,975 lb)
- Gross weight: 1,300 kg (2,866 lb)
- Fuel capacity: 200 L (44 imp gal; 53 US gal)
- Powerplant: 1 × Salmson 9AB air-cooled 9-cylinder radial, 170 kW (230 hp) 230 CV
- Propellers: 2-bladed wooden fixed-pitch propeller

Performance

- Maximum speed: 185 km/h (115 mph, 100 kn) at 2,000 m (6,600 ft)
- Service ceiling: 5,000 m (16,000 ft)
- Wing loading: 46.5 kg/m^{2} (9.5 lb/sq ft)
- Power/mass: 0.13257 kW/kg (0.08064 hp/lb)
