= Caudron C.880 =

C.880

General information
- Type: Observation/artillery liaison
- Manufacturer: Caudron
- Number built: 2

History
- First flight: 12 February 1940

The Caudron C.880 was a high-wing monoplane of all-metal construction, observation/artillery liaison aircraft built by Caudron in the early 1940s.

== Specifications ==
Data from

General characteristics

- Crew: 2
- Length: 10.25 m (33 ft 8 in)
- Wingspan: 14.8 m (48 ft 7 in)
- Height: 3.63 m (11 ft 11 in)
- Wing area: 31 m^{2} (330 sq ft)
- Powerplant: 1 × Renault 6Q-03 6-cyl inverted air-cooled in-line piston engine, 160 kW (220 hp)
- Propellers: 2-bladed propeller

Performance

- Maximum speed: 230 km/h (140 mph, 120 kn)
