= Caudron C.51 =

C.51

General information
- Type: Floatplane
- Manufacturer: Caudron
- Number built: 1

History
- First flight: 1921

The Caudron C.51 was a French biplane floatplane made by Caudron in the early 1920s.

One C.51 was built, powered by a 130 hp (97 kW) Clerget engine and bearing the registration F-AIBL. It had an empty weight of 538 kg (1,186 lb) and a maximum speed of 140 km/h (87 mph; 76 kn).

It competed in the Monaco meeting in April 1921, piloted by Poirée. He won the first speed contest by flying the 78 mi (126 km; 68 nmi) course in 45 min 27 sec, an average speed of about 99 mph (159 km/h; 86 kn), winning the 12,000 Franc prize.
