= Caudron C.91 =

French single engine biplane

General information
- Type: Four seat passenger aircraft
- National origin: France
- Manufacturer: Caudron
- Designer: André Brunet

History
- First flight: late 1923

The Caudron C.91 was a French single engine biplane with an enclosed passenger cabin seating four. It first flew in 1923.

== Design and development ==
The C.91 was a conventional single engine two bay biplane with a wooden structure and fabric covering. The bays were defined by pairs of parallel interplane struts; similar but shorter pairs of cabane struts ran from the upper fuselage to the upper wing centre section. In plan its wings were rectangular, with ailerons only on the upper wing.

For its first flights, made in late 1923, the C.91 was powered by a 224 kW (300 hp) Renault 12Fe water-cooled upright V-12 engine with a rectangular radiator in the extreme nose behind the propeller, enclosed in a flat sided, slotted cowling. The rest of the fuselage was also flat sided. The pilot had an open cockpit under the wing and behind him the four passengers sat in an enclosed cabin with four windows. Passenger comfort was a priority and up to 100 kg (220 lb) of baggage could be placed in the hold. At the rear the fin was triangular and broad, carrying a balanced rudder which extended down to the keel. Tailplane and elevators were mounted on top of the fuselage. The C.91 had a tailwheel undercarriage with its mainwheels on a single axle longer than the fuselage width, sprung to a pair of V-struts to the lower fuselage longerons.

Rather little is known about the C.91's activities but it did compete in the 1925 Coupe d'Aviation Zenith (Zenith Aviation Cup), awarded for fuel-economical load carrying. It was held in early July 1925, by which time the Renault engine had been replaced with a more powerful 276 kW (370 hp) Lorraine 12D water-cooled V-12. Bad weather kept most of the competitors, including Bechelet's C.91, grounded and the event was rerun in 1926.

== Specifications ==
Data from Hauet (2001) p.185

General characteristics

- Capacity: Four passengers
- Wing area: 65 m^{2} (700 sq ft)
- Gross weight: 2,510 kg (5,534 lb)
- Powerplant: 1 × Renault 12Fe water-cooled upright V-12, 220 kW (300 hp) 300 cv
- Propellers: 2-bladed

Performance

- Maximum speed: 166 km/h (103 mph, 90 kn)
- Time to altitude: 56 min t 4,000 m (13,123 ft)
- Wing loading: 38.6 kg/m^{2} (7.9 lb/sq ft)
