= Caudron C.20 =

1910s French aircraft

The Caudron C.20 was a French army cooperation aircraft/light bomber built by Caudron in World War I. It was powered by a 180-hp Gnome Monosoupape rotary engine.
