= Caudron Types M and N =

- Caudron Type N

General information
- Type: Racing aircraft
- National origin: France
- Manufacturer: Caudron
- Number built: at least 4

History
- First flight: late 1911

The Caudron Types M and N were small, fast French sports monoplanes, flown 1911–13 under a wide range of engine powers. There was also a military version.

== Design and development ==
Although almost all the aircraft designed by the Caudron brothers in the twenty years from their first attempts in 1908 were biplanes, they did in 1911-2 produce three monoplane types. These were the single seat racing Types M and N and the related but somewhat larger Type M2 military version. The Types M and N were very similar and, though the designations were reported together with some details in contemporary accounts, for example in l'Aérophile in 1912, it has proved difficult for modern historians to distinguish them. They shared the same fuselage and both used a variety of engines but a comparison of data from different contemporary sources suggests that the Type M had a larger wing than the Type N. Though there is some scatter, the span of the Type M was close to 8.7 m (28 ft 7 in) and of the Type N to 8.0 m (26 ft 3 in). In contrast, wing area varied within types.

Around this time, various French manufacturers like Voisin and Farman were hoping to improve the stability of aircraft against gusts by using wings that were partly flexible like those of birds and the Caudron Types M and N also included this feature. Each wing had two steel tube, wood filled spars, one at the leading edge and the other 500 mm (19.7 in) aft, a little behind one third chord, with ash ribs and wire bracing. The number of ribs varied between 10, 11 and 12 and they were conventionally rigid between the spars. Behind the rear spar the upper part of each rib was also rigid, ending at about 70% chord; the lower part was completed by a thin, flexible extension strip for about 60% of the chord. The wing was then fabric covered, though the flexible portion was only covered on the upper side. The wings were supported from above by landing wires from a four-legged pylon above the fuselage and by lifting wires from another below, shorter on the Type N than on the Type M. On the latter the tip of the lower pylon was braced by a horizontal, longitudinal strut to the centre of the undercarriage frame. Lateral control was by wing warping.

The structural fuselage of the Types M and N was a rectangular section, ash framed lattice girder with wire cross bracing. Poplar formers and stringers produced a more rounded, fabric covered section. The pilot sat well down in an open cockpit over the wing and behind the upper pylon. A wide range of engines were fitted, including the 35 hp (26 kW) Anzani three cylinder inverted Y radial engine, the 45 hp (34 kW) Anzani 6-cylinder two row radial and the 50 hp (37 kW) Gnome. The last, a rotary engine, was usually covered over the upper part to screen the pilot from oil spray; the Anzanis were mounted uncowled. They all drove large, rather broad chord propellers. The very broad chord, low aspect ratio tailplane was constructed like the wing with a flexible rear surface acting both to improve stability and, by warping, act like conventional elevators, its trailing edge extending well beyond the end of the fuselage. A small, near rectangular, one piece, rigid fin was pivoted near its leading edge from the extreme tail.

The Types M and N had a tailskid undercarriage. A transverse steel bar was fixed at each end to an ash V-strut from the lower fuselage and further braced with a steel V-strut from its centre. A pair of axles, hinged at the centre of the bar, passed through the vertices of the ash struts via rubber shock absorbers with the mainwheels, slightly toed out and 1.4 m (4 ft 7 in) apart, beyond them. Early versions of the undercarriage used a single axle rather than a split one. There was an unusually long, curved, tall tailskid at the rear to keep the long tailplane clear of the ground.

Apart from basic specification (dimensions, weights and speed) in Laérophile and Jane's All the World's Aircraft 1913, no records of the Type M2 are currently known.

== Operational history ==
The first flight dates are not currently known, nor which type flew first, but there are reports of a Type N, piloted by Renée Caudron, flying on 23 December 1911. Fitted with the 35 hp (26 kW) Anzani engine, it flew an out and return flight from Caudron's Le Crotoy base to Pointe-Saint-Quentin at 100 km/h (62 mph). Two days later it was on display at the 1911 Paris Salon. It was re-engined with a 45 hp (34 kW) Anzani for an English owner, E.W. Ewen, who flew it home across the English Channel on 2 May 1912. Flown by Maurice Guillaux it took part in a circuit of London race in June 1912, starting from Hendon, but retired from lack of fuel just before the end when it looked a likely winner. After many modifications it was on display at the Olympia show in February 1913. In September 1913 F. Goodden demonstrated it the Aerial Derby at Hendon, powered by a 35 hp (26 kW) Anzani; it had been entered for the race with the 45 hp (34 kW) engine but did not compete. The 8.4 m^{2} (90 sq ft) wing area of this aircraft, possibly the only Type N, was much smaller than that usually quoted (10 m^{2} (108 sq ft)). Though its span was 230 mm (9.1 in) less than the 8 m (26 ft 3 in) said to indicate a Type N and shown on the three-view in L'Aérophile, the main cause was a narrow chord (1.2 m (4 ft 0 in)) compared with the 1.4–1.5 m (4 ft 7 in – 4 ft 11 in) found in the French references.

Emile Obre flew many demonstration flights in early 1912 with a Type M, powered by a 50 hp (37 kW) Gnome engine. He flew across mainland France and in Corsica, Sardinia and French colonies in North Africa, visiting Tunis and Carthage, where the aircraft was damaged in an accident. At least three Type Ms were built.

== Variants ==
Type M
Span 8.7 m (28 ft 7 in) and long lower pylon braced to the undercarriage cross-member.

Type M2
Military machine, span 9.4 m (30 ft 10 in), wing area 14 m^{2} (151 sq ft), length 6.1 m (20 ft 0 in), weight 235 kg (518 lb), maximum speed about 115 km/h (71 mph).

Type N
Span 8.0 m (26 ft 3 in) and short lower pylon.

== Specifications (Type N) ==
Data from Hauet (2001)

General characteristics

- Crew: One
- Length: 6.0 m (19 ft 8 in)
- Wingspan: 8.0 m (26 ft 3 in)
- Height: 2.0 m (6 ft 7 in)
- Wing area: 10.0 m^{2} (108 sq ft)
- Empty weight: 175 kg (386 lb) ; engine unspecified
- Gross weight: 300 kg (661 lb) ; engine unspecified
- Powerplant: 1 × Anzani radial or Gnome rotary , 26–37 kW (35–50 hp) Several different engine types were fitted
- Propellers: 2-bladed Caudron, 2.03 m (6 ft 8 in) diameter

Performance

- Maximum speed: 125 km/h (78 mph, 67 kn) ; engine unspecified
