= Caudron C.160 =

1920s French aircraft

The Caudron C.160 was a French training aircraft built by Caudron in the late 1920s. It was a two-seat biplane powered by a 65 hp Salmson 5Ac 5-cyl radial.
