= Caudron C.65 =

Single seat biplane floatplane

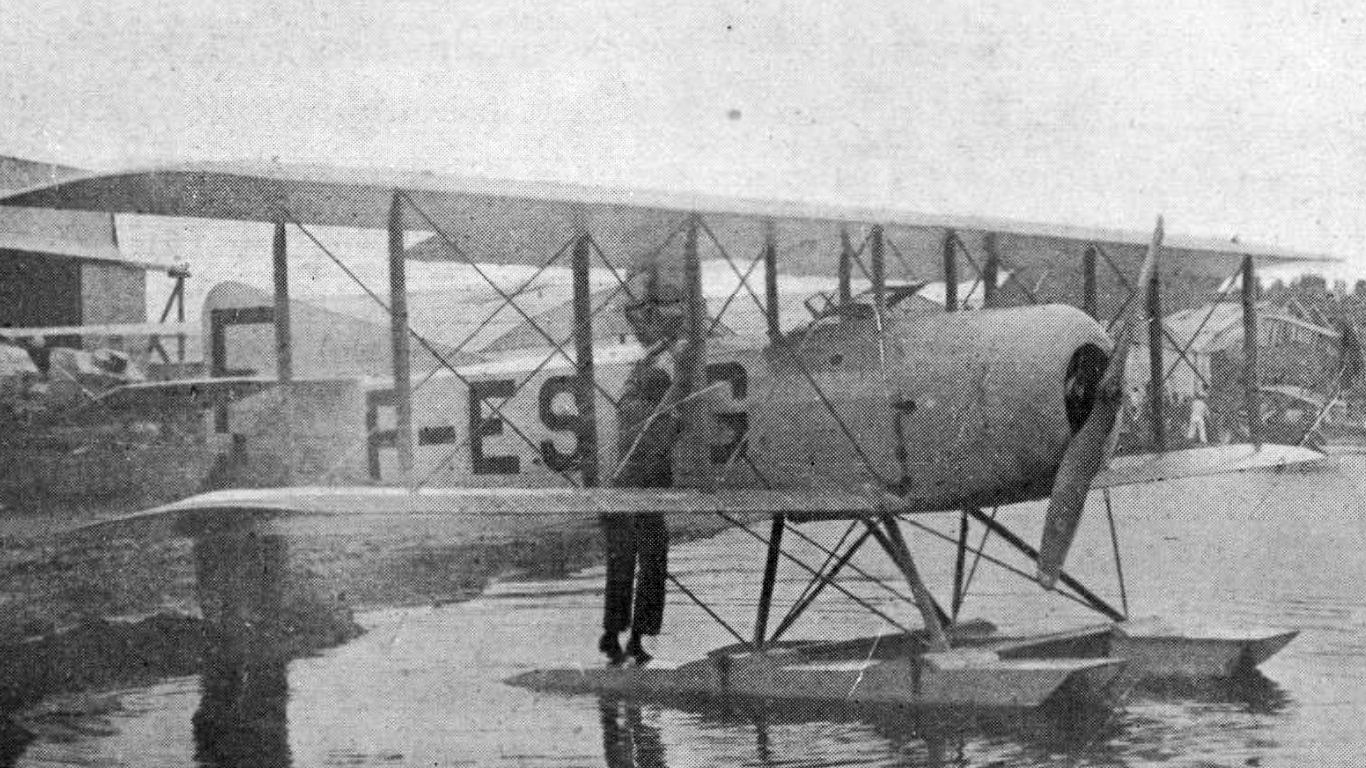

General information
- Type: Single seat floatplane
- National origin: France
- Manufacturer: Caudron
- Designer: Paul Deville
- Number built: 1

History
- First flight: January 1922

The Caudron C.65 was a single seat biplane floatplane designed and built in France in 1922. Only one was completed.

== Design and development ==
The C.65 was a conventional wire braced, two bay biplane, with equal span wings mounted without stagger. The interplane struts were in vertical, parallel pairs and vertical cabane struts joined the upper wing centre section to the upper fuselage longerons. There were ailerons only on the upper wings.

The C.65's engine was a 97 kW (130 hp) Clerget 9B nine cylinder rotary, cowled and driving a two blade propeller. The C.65 was piloted from a single, open cockpit under the wing. At the rear of the flat sided fuselage there was a broad, triangular fin, carrying a straight edged rudder that extended down to the keel. As the tailplane was on the top of the fuselage, its elevators needed a cut-out for rudder movement. Rectangular cross section floats were held 2.0 m (6 ft 7 in) apart by a pair of sturdy cross bars from the ends of which ran angled struts to the lower fuselage, aided by wire bracing.

The C.65 flew for the first time in January 1922, piloted by Poiré. Only one C.65 was built, though the C.66, a version with a 134 kW (180 hp) Hispano-Suiza 8Ab liquid-cooled V-8 engine had an otherwise similar airframe.

== Operational history ==
Between 17 and 19 April 1922 Poiré flew the C.65 in a seaplane race from Marseille to Monaco and back, a distance of 413 km (257 mi), winning first prize.

It was still being flown in competitions in July 1923.

== Variants ==
C.65
97 kW (130 hp) Clerget 9B 9-cylinder rotary engine.
C.66
134 kW (180 hp) Hispano-Suiza 8Ab liquid-cooled V-8 engine. 14% heavier and faster.

== Specifications (C.65) ==
Data from Hauet (2001)

General characteristics

- Crew: One
- Length: 7.65 m (25 ft 1 in)
- Wingspan: 12.00 m (39 ft 4 in)
- Height: 2.75 m (9 ft 0 in)
- Wing area: 35.00 m^{2} (376.7 sq ft)
- Empty weight: 614 kg (1,354 lb)
- Gross weight: 1,014 kg (2,235 lb)
- Powerplant: 1 × Clerget 9B 9-cylinder rotary, 97 kW (130 hp)
- Propellers: 2-bladed

Performance

- Maximum speed: 140 km/h (87 mph, 76 kn)
