= Caudron Type G =

1914 single-engined French biplane

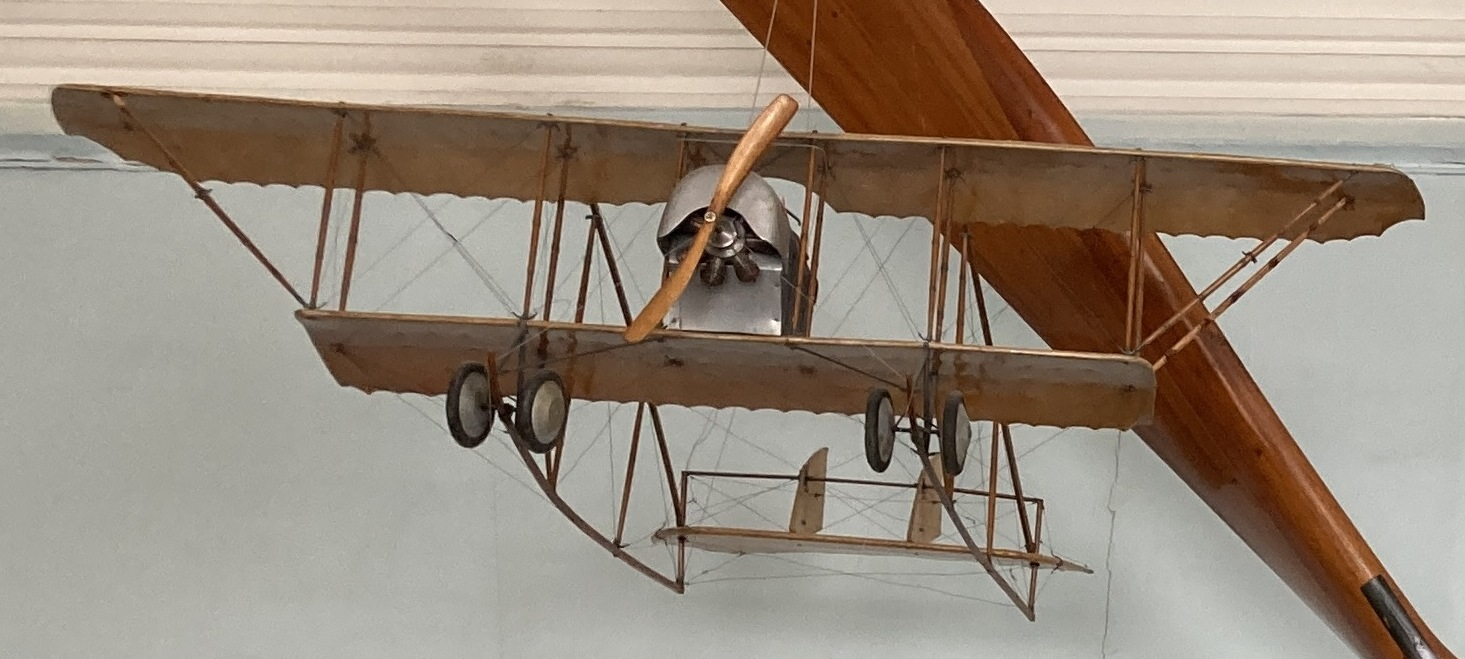
- Caudron G.3, 1914 (model); Collections of the Central House of Aviation and Cosmonautics

General information
- Type: Trainer aircraft
- Manufacturer: Caudron
- Primary user: Aéronautique Militaire
- Number built: 1

History
- First flight: 1913
- Variant: Caudron G.2

The Caudron Type G was a single-engined French biplane built by Caudron prior to World War I. Developments of the Caudron G saw widespread service in France, the Russian Empire, and the United Kingdom.

== Specifications ==
Data from

General characteristics

- Crew: 1
- Length: 7.30 m (23 ft 11 in)
- Wingspan: 13.90 m (45 ft 7 in)
- Wing area: 30 m^{2} (320 sq ft)
- Empty weight: 350 kg (772 lb)
- Gross weight: 625 kg (1,378 lb)
- Powerplant: 1 × Gnome Monosoupape 9 Type B 9-cylinder air-cooled rotary piston engine, 60 kW (80 hp)
- Propellers: 2-bladed fixed-pitch propeller

Performance

- Maximum speed: 100 km/h (62 mph, 54 kn)
- Time to altitude: 500 m (1,600 ft) in 6 minutes

== See also ==
Related development

- Caudron G.2
- Caudron R.4
- Caudron R.11
