= Caudron C.67 =

French single-seat airplane

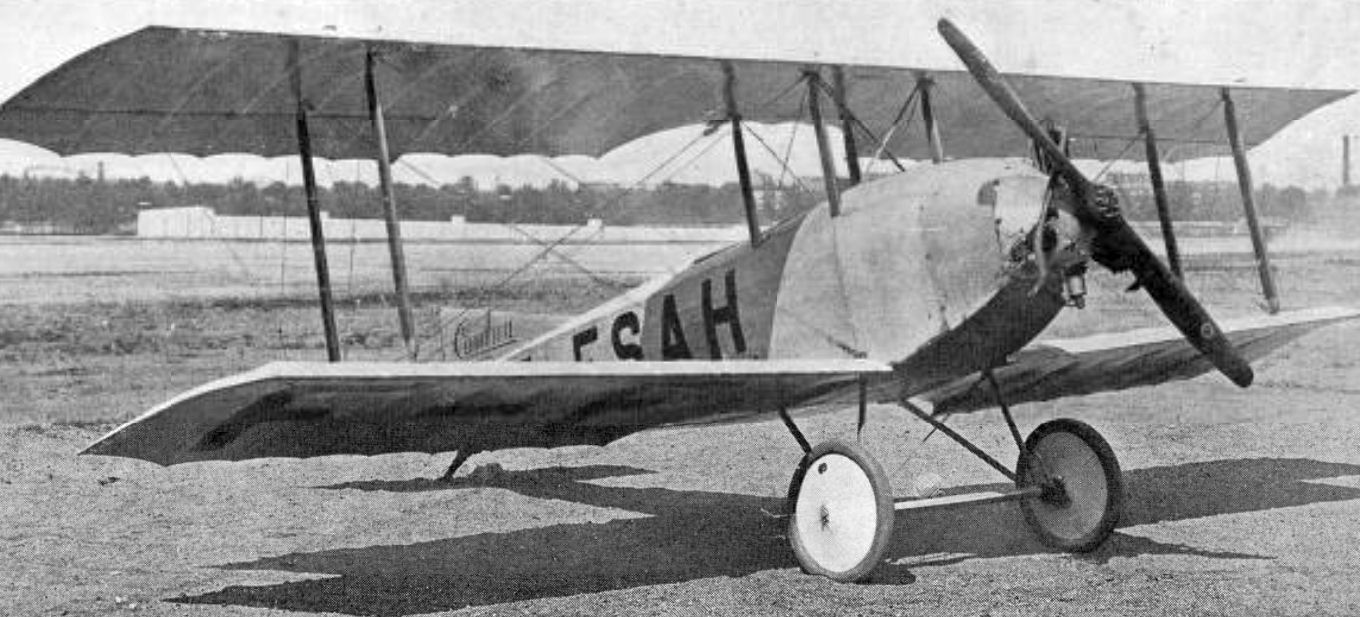

General information
- Type: Sport aircraft
- National origin: France
- Manufacturer: Caudron
- Designer: Paul Deville
- Number built: 1

History
- First flight: April or May 1922

The Caudron C.67 was a simple single seat biplane with a low powered engine. It was built and flown in France in 1922.

== Design and development ==
The C.67 was, apart from its undercarriage, an all wood-framed aircraft with fabric covering. It was a single bay biplane with wings that were rectangular in plan apart from angled tips, had equal spans and were mounted without stagger. The lower wings were mounted on the lower fuselage longerons, with the upper wing braced to it by parallel pairs of vertical interplane struts. Four similar but shorter cabane struts connected the upper fuselage and upper wing centre section; bracing wires ensured structural stability. The upper wing was built in two parts and carried the ailerons.

Its fuselage was also simple, with a rectangular section apart from the curved upper decking. The underside curved upwards strongly near the nose, where its three-cylinder Anzani radial engine was cowled with its cylinders projecting for cooling. There was a single, open cockpit under the wing, which had a wide cut-out in its trailing edge to improve upward visibility. At the rear a broad, triangular fin carried an angular, unbalanced rudder, which reached down to the keel. Since the tailplane, with a plan similar to that of the wings, was mounted on top of the fuselage, the elevators required a cut-out for rudder movement. The C.67 had a fixed tailskid undercarriage. its mainwheels were on a steel single axle sprung to a pair a steel V-form struts, assisted by wire bracing.

The C.67 was flying regularly by mid-May 1922, piloted by Poirée, and performing aerobatics. It was exhibited at the 1922 Paris Salon that December. The prototype was the only example of the C.67.

== Specifications ==
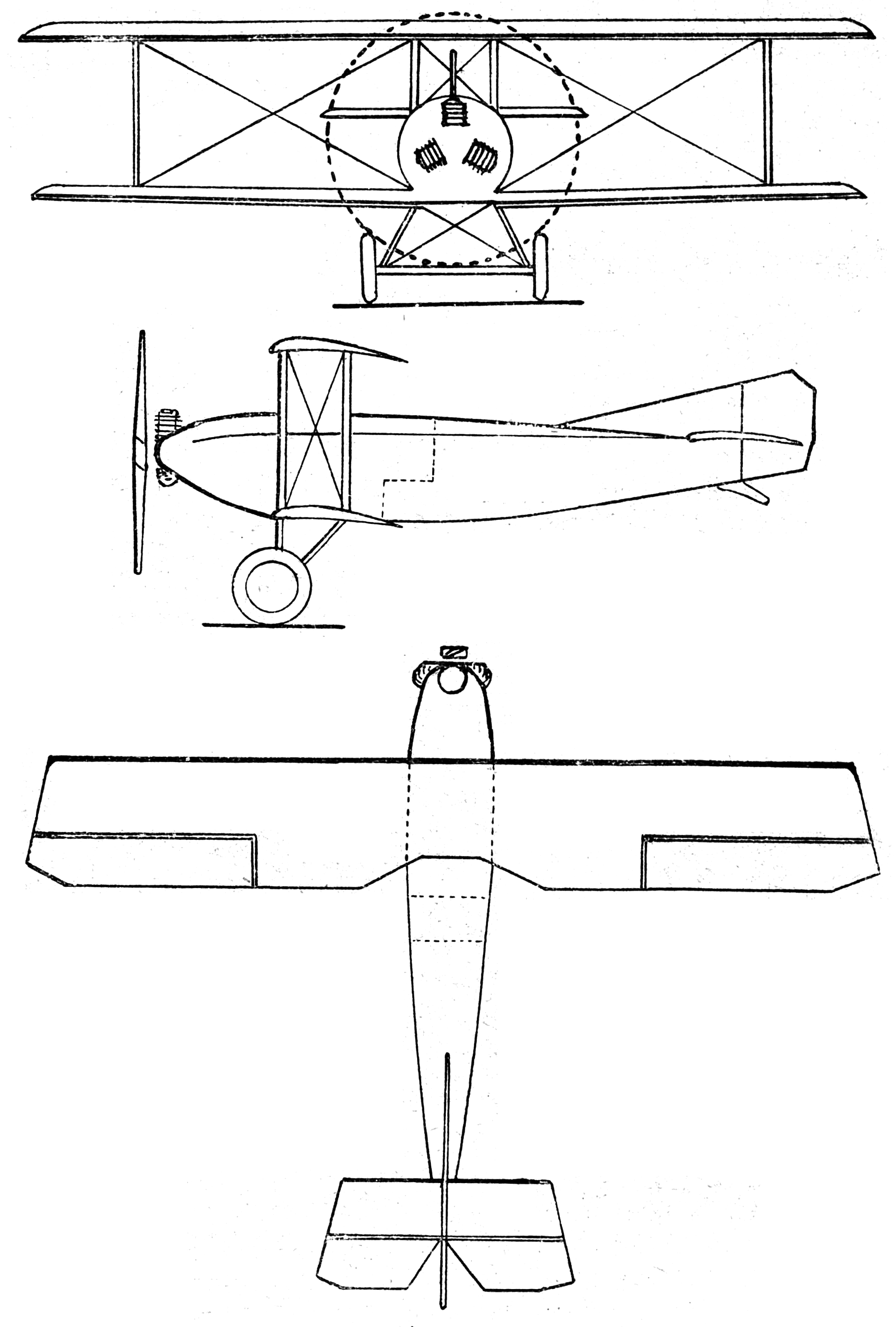
Caudron C.67 3-view drawing from Les Ailes May 25,1922

Data from Hauet (2001)

General characteristics

- Crew: One
- Length: 5.80 m (19 ft 0 in)
- Wingspan: 7.30 m (23 ft 11 in)
- Height: 2.40 m (7 ft 10 in)
- Wing area: 14.00 m^{2} (150.7 sq ft)
- Empty weight: 210 kg (463 lb)
- Gross weight: 324 kg (714 lb)
- Fuel capacity: 34 kg (75 lb)
- Powerplant: 1 × Anzani 3-cylinder air-cooled inverted Y or radial, 19 kW (25 hp)
- Propellers: 2-bladed

Performance

- Maximum speed: 95 km/h (59 mph, 51 kn)
- Service ceiling: 1,300 m (4,300 ft)
