= Caudron Type C =

Type C

General information
- Type: Single seat military biplane
- National origin: France
- Manufacturer: Caudron
- Number built: 2

History
- First flight: late 1911
- Developed from: Caudron Type B

The Caudron Type C was a single seat French biplane, intended for military evaluation. Two were built in 1911.

== Design and development ==
From the Type B of 1911 to the World War I Caudron G.3 Caudron biplanes had a common layout with tractor engines, occupants in a nacelle mounted between the wings and empennage on twin booms. The earlier Types B-D in this sequence began as equal span biplanes, then were modified into sesquiplanes.

In its original form, the Type C was an equal-span, wire-braced two-bay biplane, though the inner bay was only about half the width of the outer. The two-spar fabric-covered wings had the same rectangular plan apart from angled tips. Wing area was 22 m^{2} (240 sq ft). There was no stagger, so the two sets of parallel interplane struts were parallel and vertical. The rear spar was ahead of mid-chord, leaving the ribs in the rear part of the wing flexible and allowing roll control by wing warping.

The nacelle was a simple, flat sided structure. As on the Type B, it was supported above the lower wing on two more pairs of interplane struts but on the Type C the left and right pairs passed within the nacelle, rather than down its sides. A 37 kW (50 hp) Gnome Omega rotary engine was mounted in the front under a rudimentary shield to protect the pilot from oil spray, though a 26 or 34 kW (35 or 45 hp) Anzani 3-cylinder radial engine could also fitted. The nacelle extended aft at the wing trailing edge, with the pilot just aft of mid-chord.

The empennage of the Type C was supported on a pair of girders arranged parallel to one another in plan. The upper girder members were attached to the upper wing spars at the tops of the innermost interplane struts and the lower ones ran under the lower wing, mounted on downward extensions of the inner interplane struts. The mounting was strengthened with two diagonal struts on each side, one from the base of the forward interplane strut to the upcurved tip of the lower member and the other from the rear interplane strut to the junction of the lower member and its first vertical cross member. Each of these lower members, which supported the aircraft on the ground as skids, carried twin, rubber sprung landing wheels. Behind the wing the upper and lower members converged to the rear; the drag on the lower members reduced the landing run to 20 m (66 ft) There were three vertical cross braces on each girder but the only lateral inter-girder cross-members were near the tail, though there was wire bracing. The broad chord, roughly rectangular, warping tailplane was mounted a little below the upper girder member. Above it, a pair of rectangular rudders were separated by about one third of the tailplane span.

Two Type Cs were built and delivered to the military in November 1911. In July 1912 they were modified into sesquiplanes to ease their accommodation in field tents. The Type C appeared in the Caudron catalogue of 1912 in that form, with the upper wing overhang supported by parallel, outward leaning struts from the bases of the outer interplane struts.

== Specifications (1912 catalogue sesquiplane, Gnome engine) ==
Data from Hauet 2001, pp.26-7

General characteristics

- Crew: one
- Length: 6.75 m (22 ft 2 in)
- Upper wingspan: 10.30 m (33 ft 10 in)
- Lower wingspan: 6.80 m (22 ft 4 in)
- Wing area: 25 m^{2} (270 sq ft)
- Empty weight: 260 kg (573 lb)
- Gross weight: 440 kg (970 lb)
- Powerplant: 1 × Gnome 7-cylinder rotary, 37 kW (50 hp)
- Propellers: 2-bladed

Performance

- Maximum speed: 90 km/h (56 mph, 49 kn)
- Time to altitude: 10 min to 500 m (1,600 ft)
