= Trimotor =

Aircraft powered by three piston engines

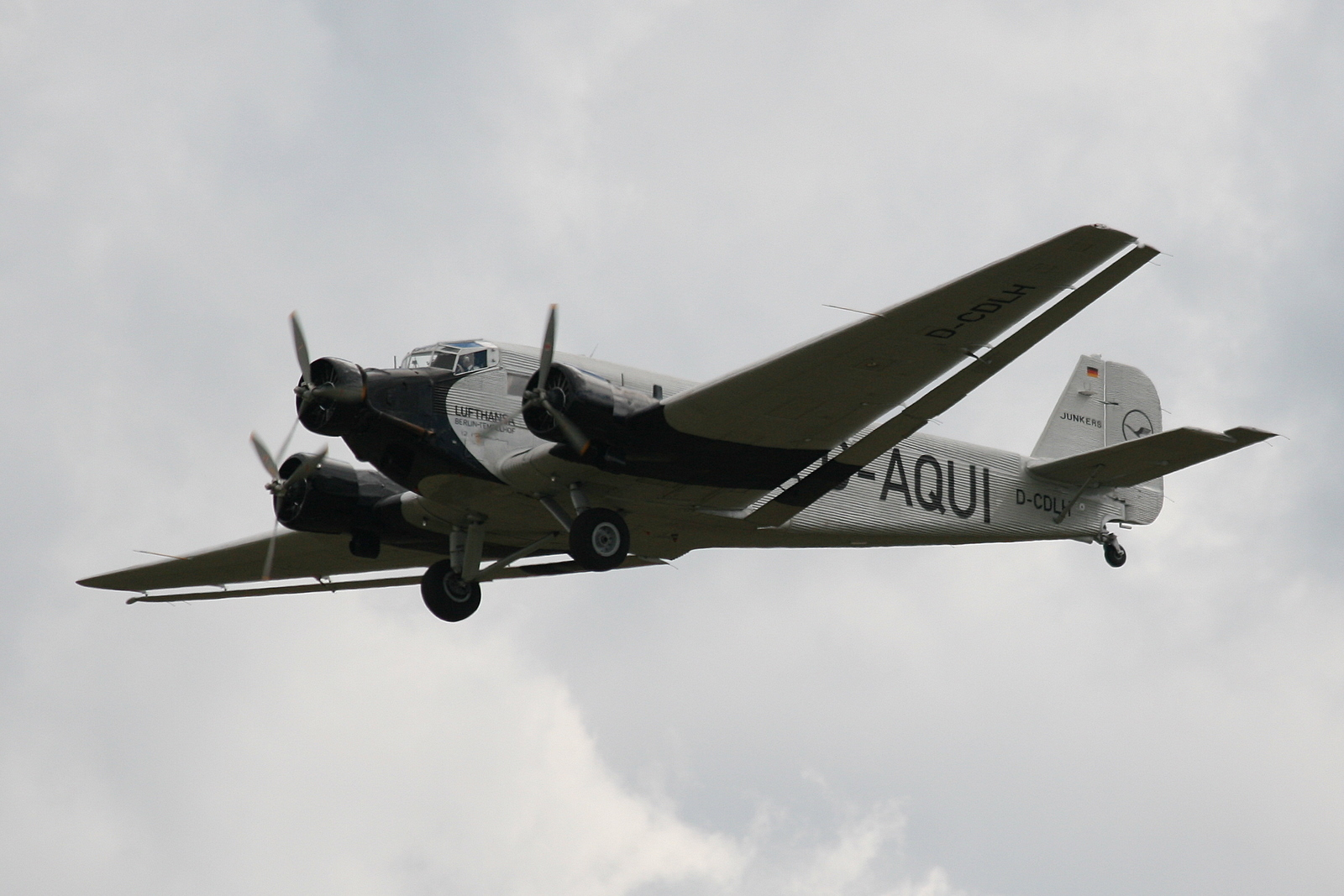
Nearly 5,000 Junkers Ju 52/3m were built, the most of any trimotor

A trimotor is a propeller-driven aircraft powered by three internal combustion engines, characteristically one on the nose and one on each wing. A compromise between complexity and safety, such a configuration was typically a result of the limited power of the engines available to the designer. Many trimotors were designed and built in the 1920s and 1930s as the most effective means of maximizing payload.

Other - and uncommon - configurations include engines above the wing, as on seaplanes, including in pusher configuration, and an engine on each wing and one on the tail.

The best known trimotors are the Fokker F, Ford AT, and Junkers Ju series aircraft.

== Gallery ==
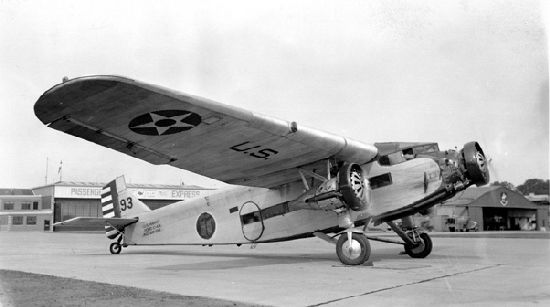
Ford Trimotor, a pioneering all-metal aircraft

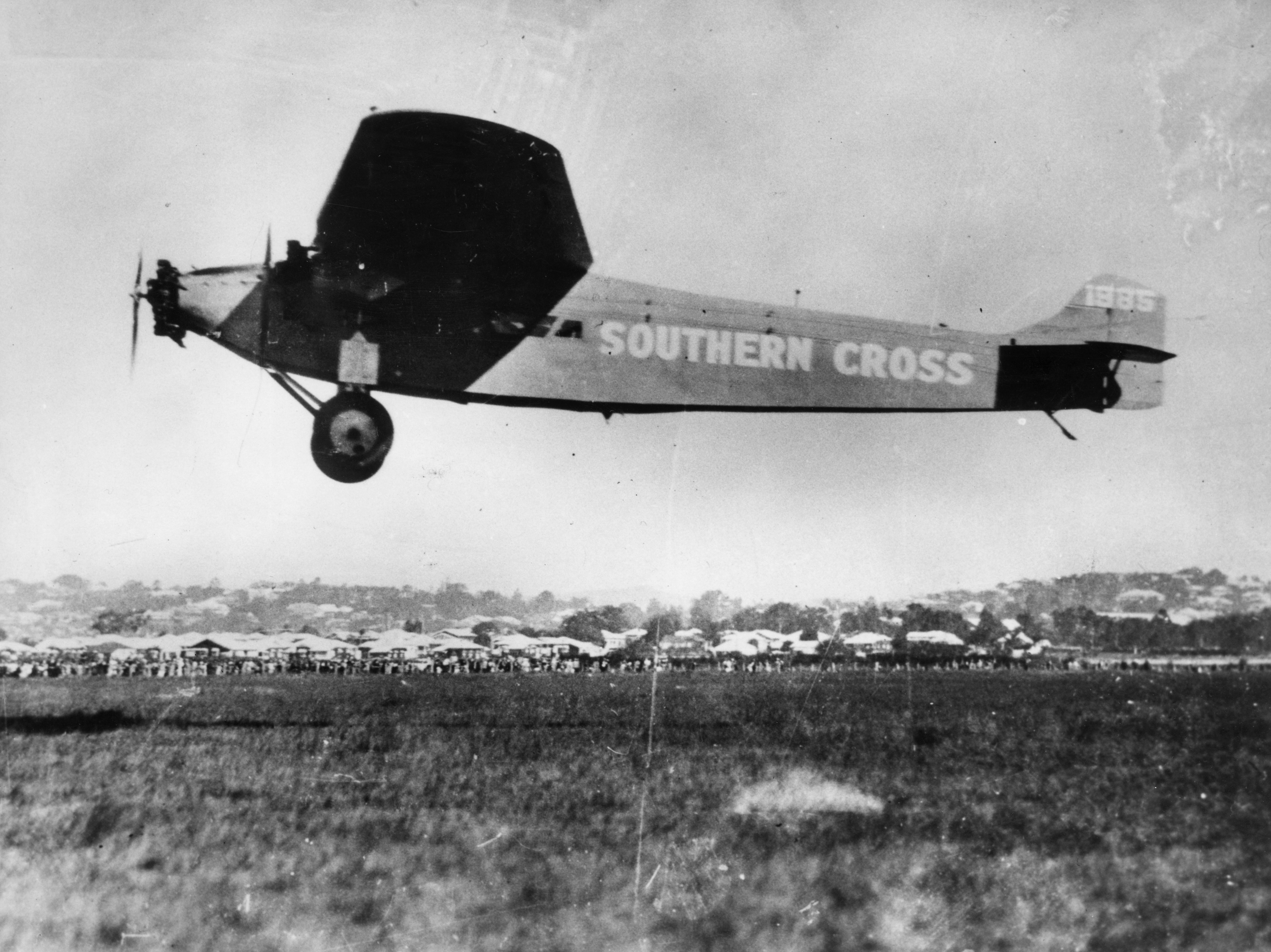
Fokker F.VIIb/3m landing in Brisbane in 1928 after making first crossing of the Pacific

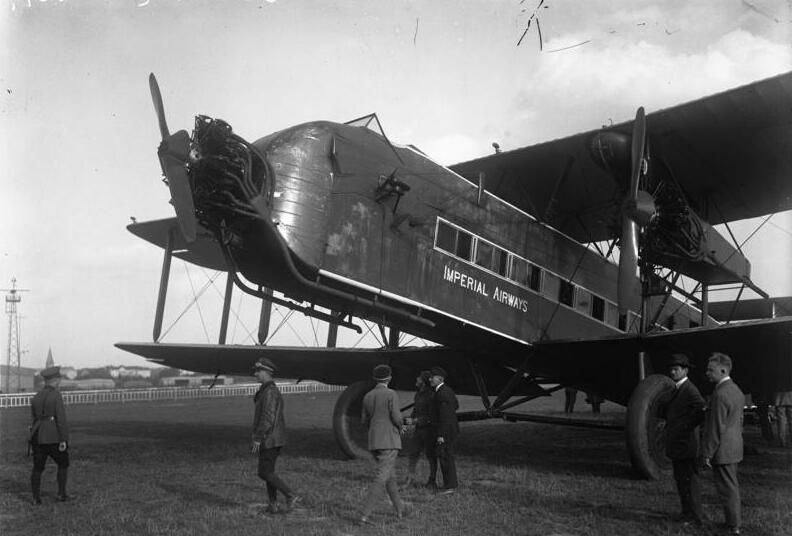
Imperial Airways Armstrong Whitworth A.W. 154 Argosy

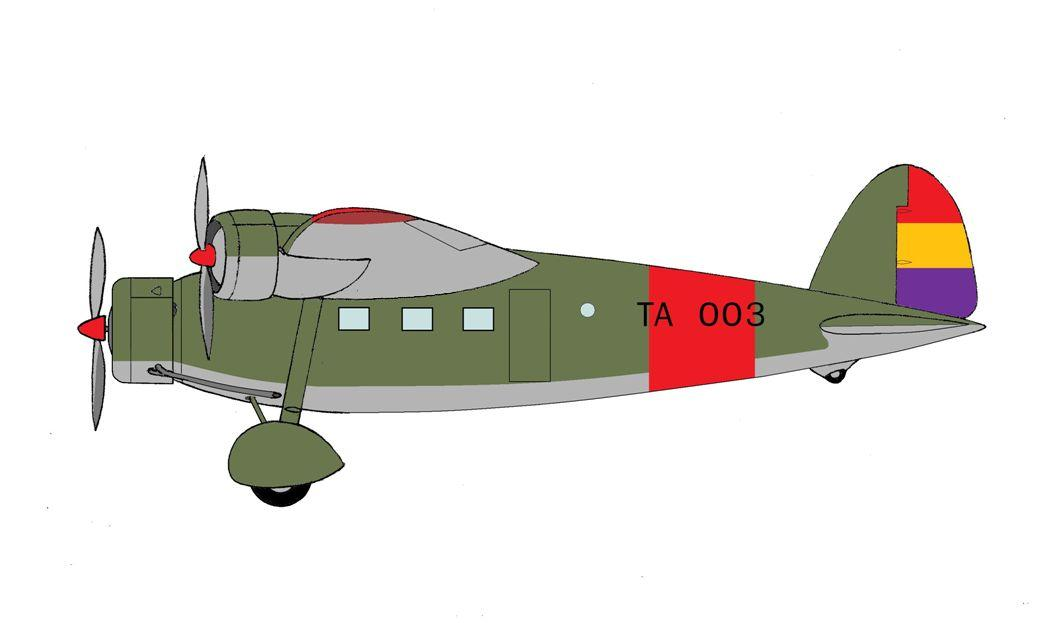
Only three Avia 51 were produced

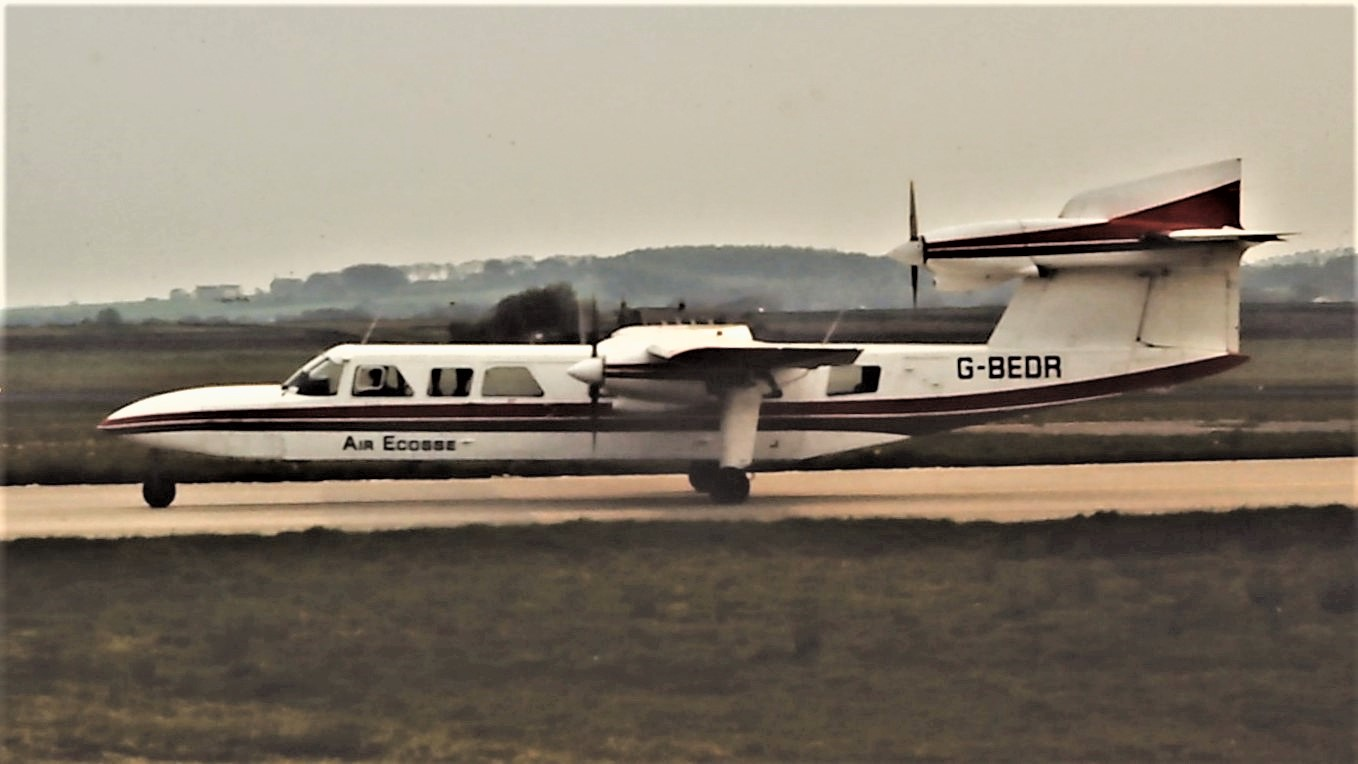
Britten-Norman Trislander

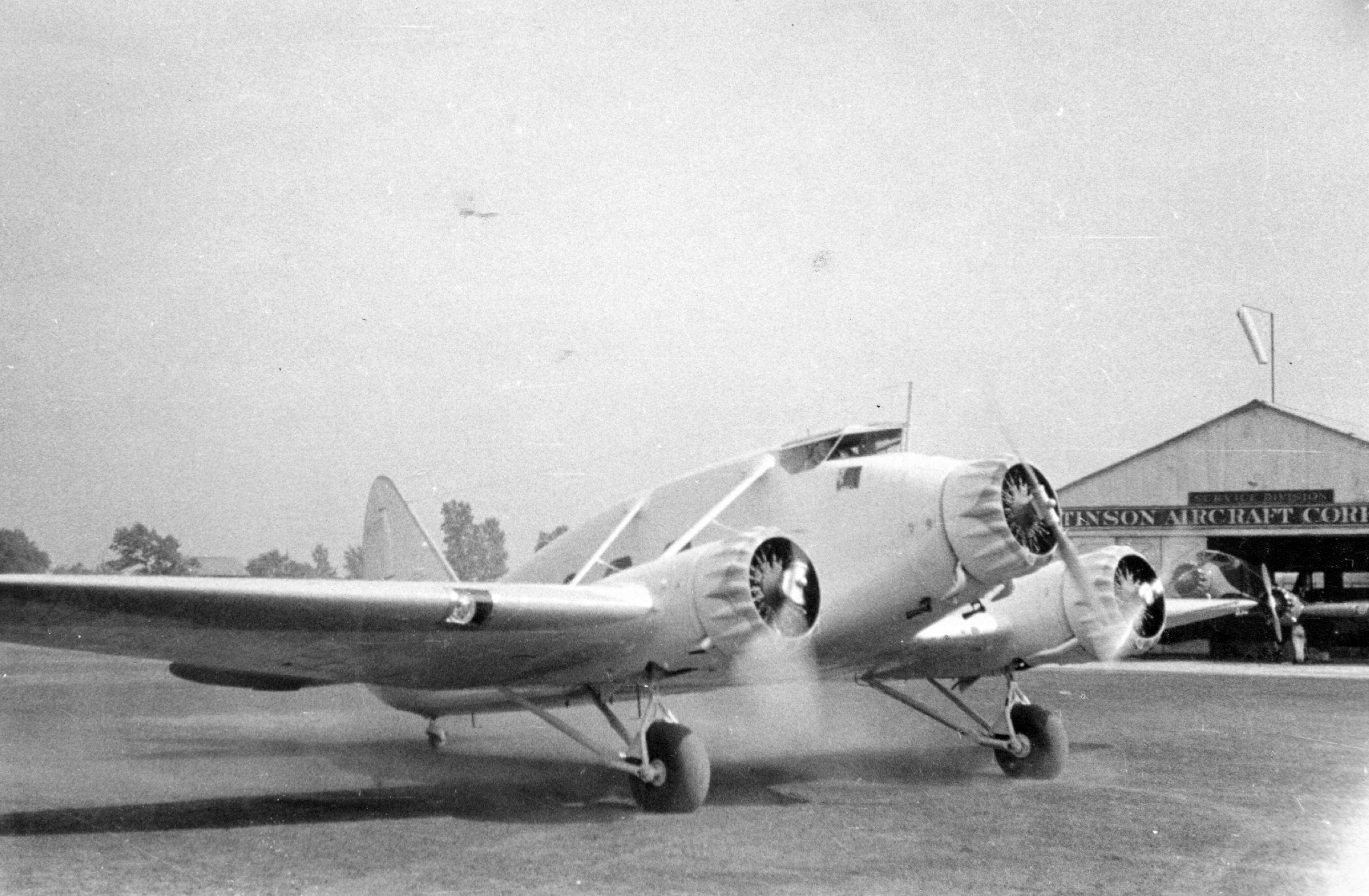
Stinson Model A

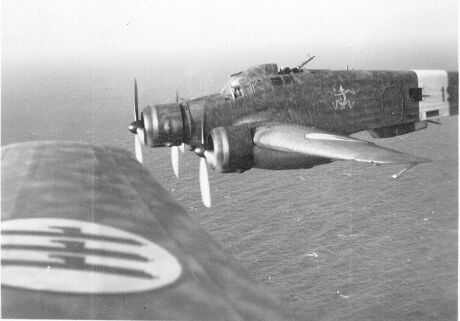
Savoia Marchetti S.M.79 in formation during WW2

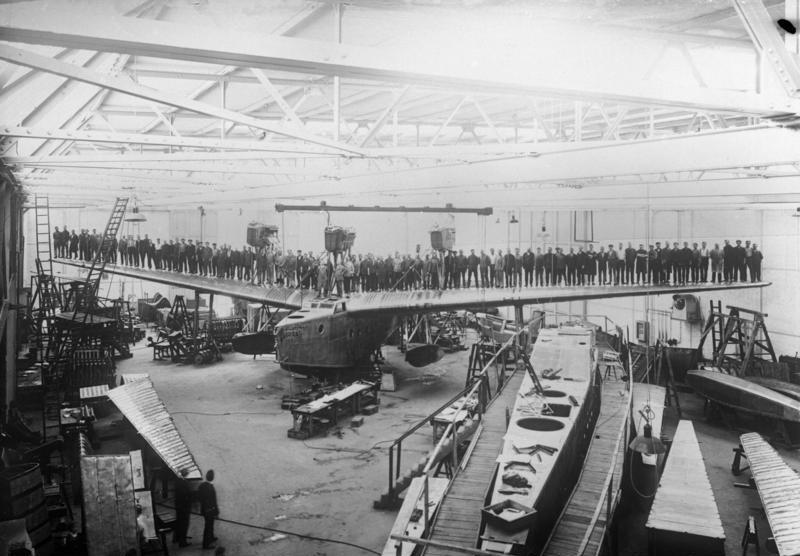
Rohrbach Romar under construction

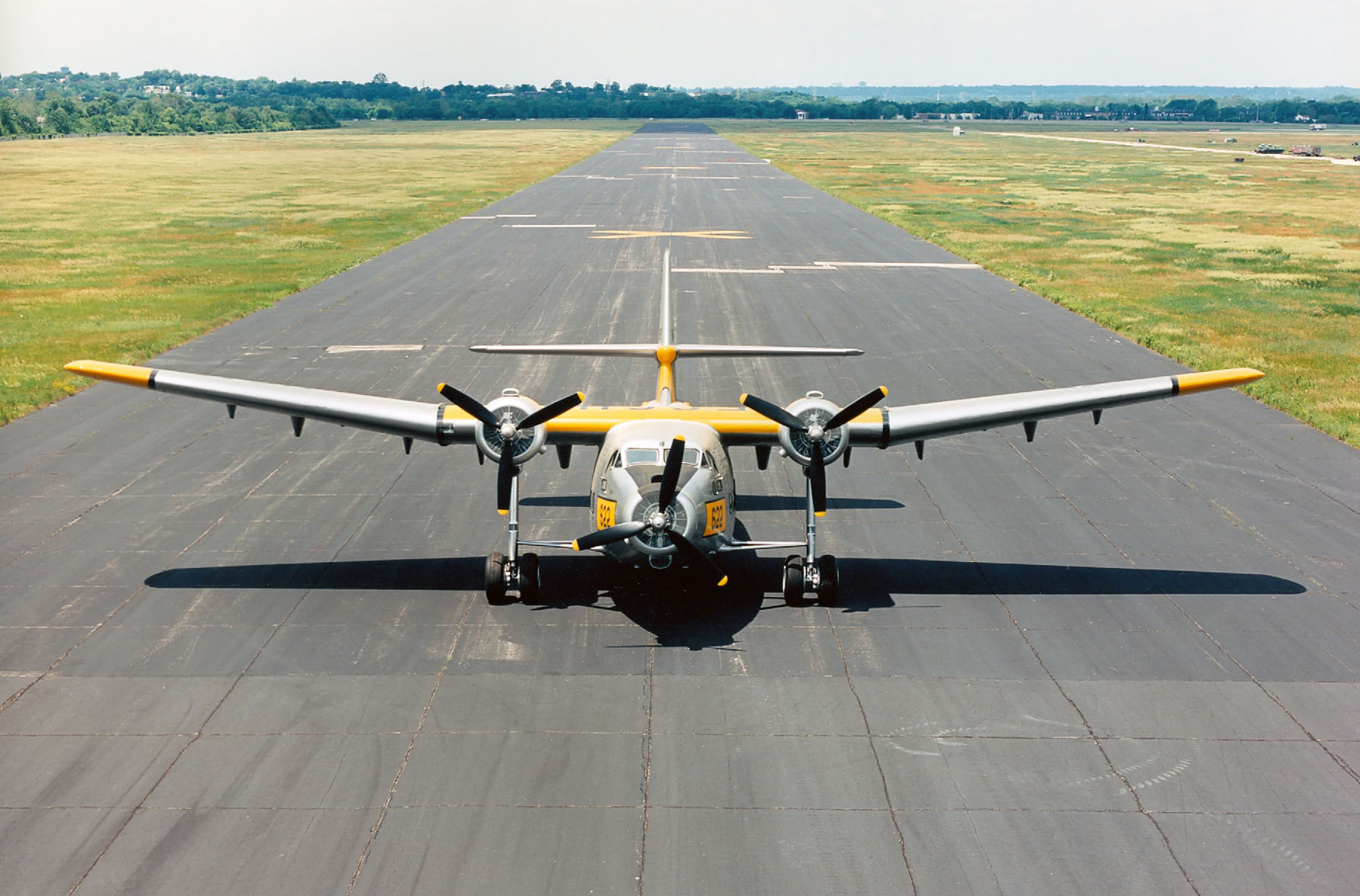
Northrop YC-125 Raider

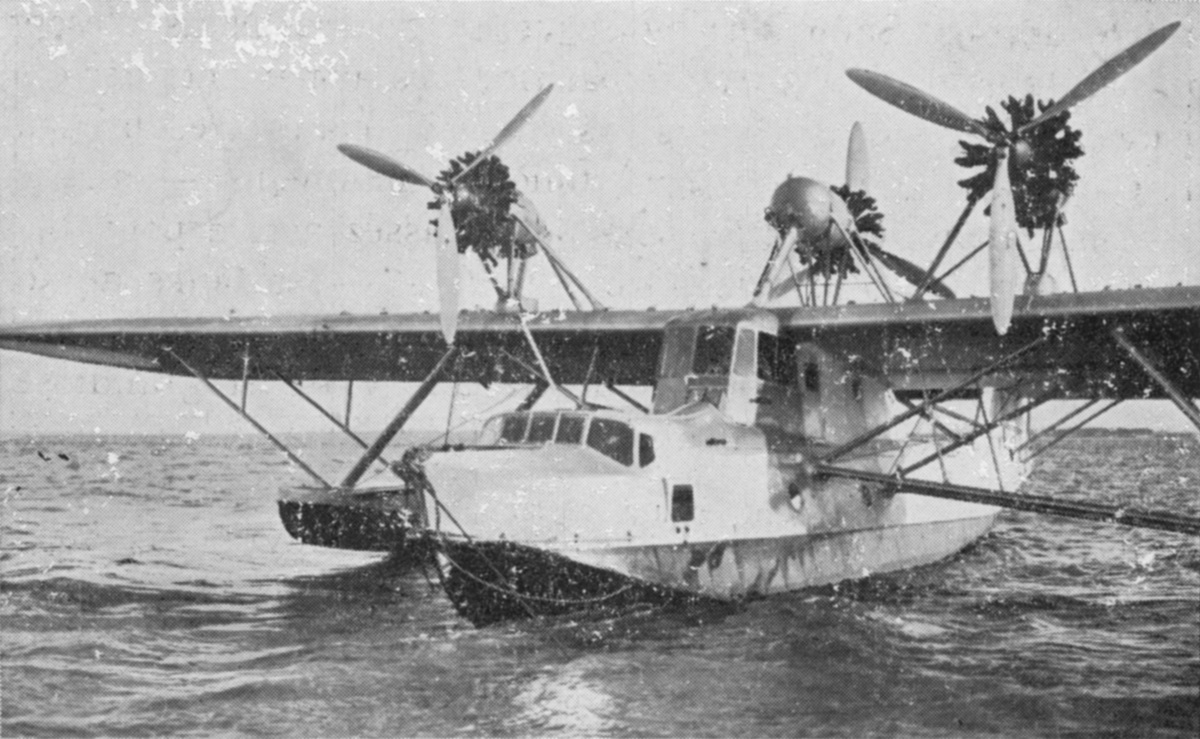
Loire 70 amphibian

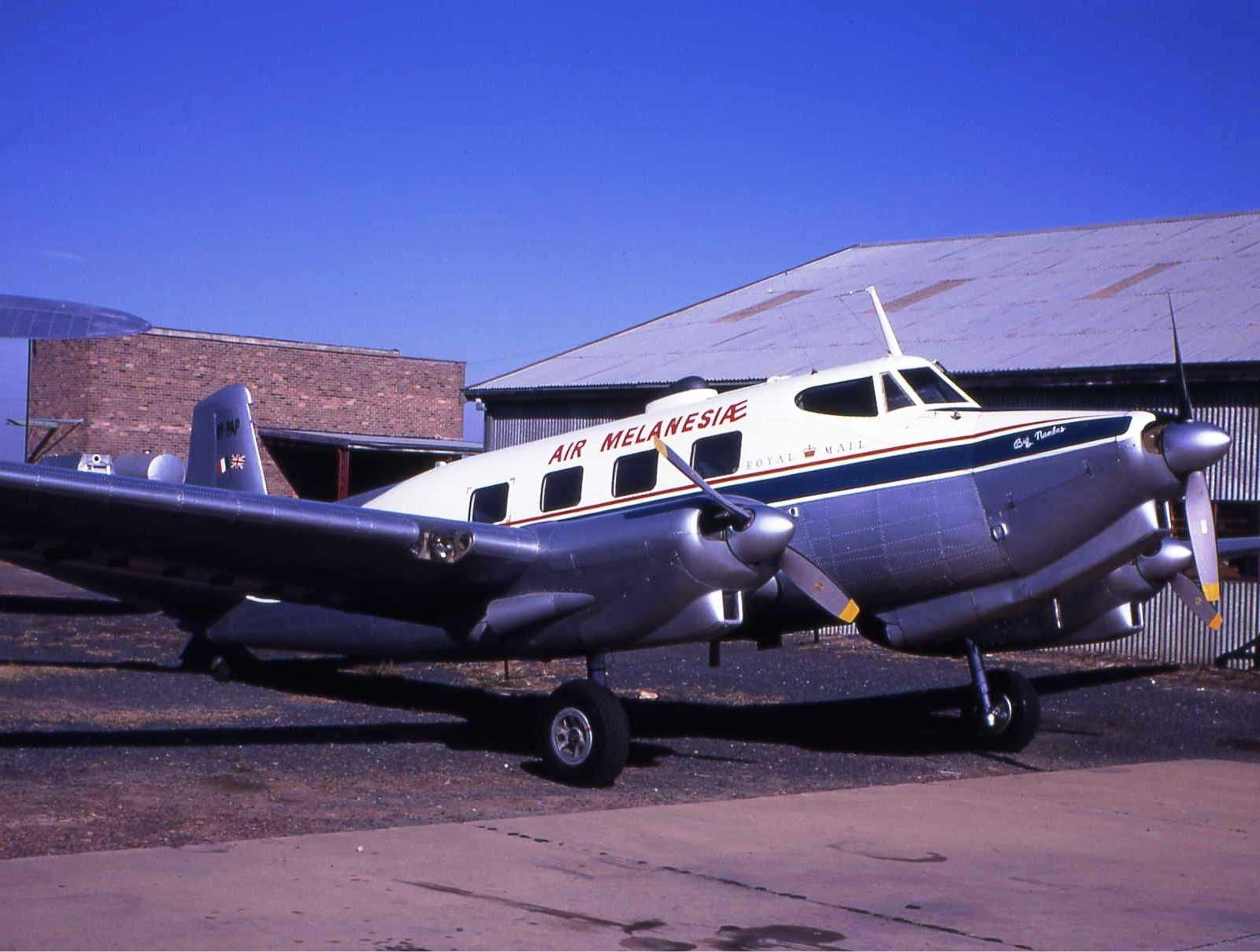
de Havilland Australia DHA-3 Drover

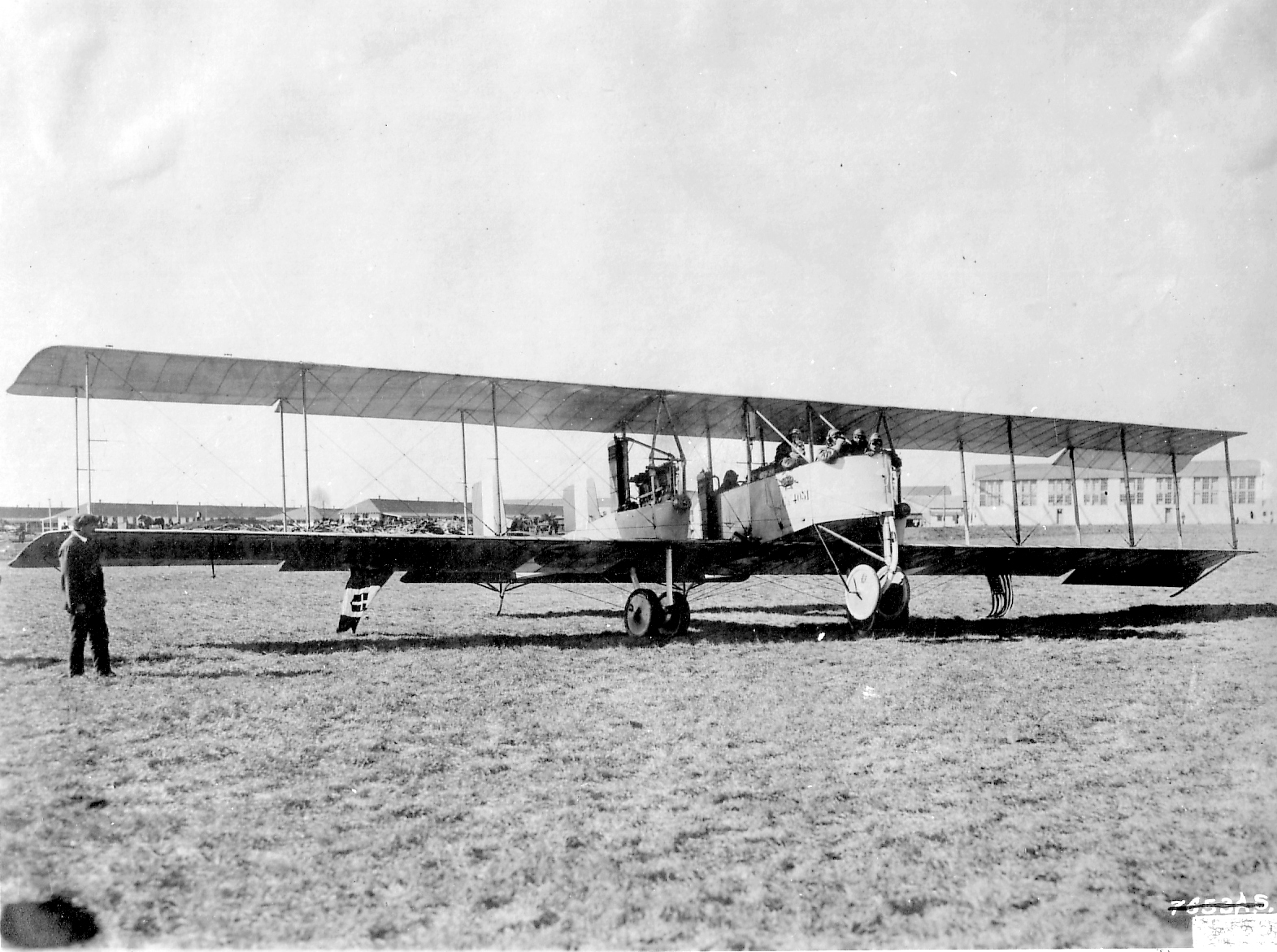
WW1 Caproni Ca.3 trimotor

== List of trimotors ==
Aircraft name	Country of origin	Year Developed
AD Seaplane Type 1000	UK	1916
Airspeed Ferry	UK	1932
Airworthy Terrier	US	1928
Anatra DE	Russia	1916
ANF Les Mureaux 140T	France	1932
Armstrong Whitworth Argosy	UK	1926
Avia 51	Czechoslovakia	1933
Avia 57	Czechoslovakia	1935
Aviméta 132	France	1927
Avis BGV-1	Austria	1924
Avro 618 Ten	UK	1929
Avro 619 Five	UK	1929
Avro 624 Six	UK	1930
Bach 3-CT Air Yacht	US	1927
Barcala-Cierva-Díaz BCD.3	Spain	1919
Batson Air Yacht/Dragonfly	US	1913
Beardmore Inflexible	UK	1928
Beechcraft Model 18 Tiara engine testbed	US	1966
Bellanca 28-92	US	1937
Bernard 60	France	1929
Bernard 160	France	1932
Bernard SIMB AB 16	France	1927
Besson MB.36	France	1930
Blackburn Iris	UK	1926
Blackburn Perth	UK	1933
Blackburn Sydney	UK	1930
Bloch MB.60	France	1930
Bloch MB.120	France	1932
Bloch MB.300	France	1935
Blohm & Voss BV 138	Germany	1937
Boeing Model 80	US	1928
Boulton Paul P.32	UK	1931
Bratu 220	Romania	1932
Breda A.14	Italy	1928
Breda Ba.32	Italy	1931
Breda Ba.46	Italy	1934
Breda CC.20	Italy	1929
Breguet XI	France	1916
Breguet 393T	France	1931
Breguet 521	France	1933
Bresciani Bre.1	Italy	1915
Britten-Norman Trislander	UK	1970
Brown-Mercury	US	1928
CANT 6	Italy	1925
CANT 22	Italy	1927
CANT 23	Italy	1932
CANT Z.506	Italy	1935
CANT Z.508	Italy	1936
CANT Z.509	Italy	1937
CANT Z.1007	Italy	1937
CANT Z.1012	Italy	1938
Caproni Ca.1	Italy	1914
Caproni Ca.3	Italy	1916
Caproni Ca.4	Italy	1917
Caproni Ca.5	Italy	1917
Caproni Ca.95	Italy	1929?
Caproni Ca.97	Italy	1927
Caproni Ca.101	Italy	1928
Caproni Ca.131	Italy	1934
Caproni Ca.132	Italy	1934
Caproni Ca.133	Italy	1934
Caudron C.25	France	1919
Caudron C.37	France	1920
Caudron C.39	France	1921
Caudron C.61	France	1921
Caudron C.81	France	1923
Caudron C.180	France	1930
Caudron C.183	France	1923
Charpentier C-1	France	1935
CNA Delta	Italy	1931
CNNA HL-8	Brazil	1943
Conroy Tri-Turbo-Three	US	1969
Consolidated XPY-1 (prototype only)	US	1929
Consolidated XP2Y-1 (prototype only)	US	1932
Couzinet 10	France	1928
Couzinet 21	France	1931
Couzinet 22	France	1932
Couzinet 27	France	1928
Couzinet 30	France	1930
Couzinet 33 Biarritz	France	1931
Couzinet 40	France	1932
Couzinet 70	France	1932
Couzinet 100	France	1933
Couzinet 101	France	1934
Couzinet 103	France	1933
Crawford Special	US	1929
Curtiss Eagle I	US	1919
Curtiss Model H prototype only	US	1914
Curtiss NC prototype only	US	1918
DAR 4	Bulgaria	1930
Dewoitine D.31	France	1932
Dewoitine D.332	France	1933
Dewoitine D.333	France	1934
Dewoitine D.338	France	1936
Dewoitine D.342	France	1939
Dewoitine D.430	France	1932
de Havilland DH.72	UK	1931
de Havilland Australia DHA-3 Drover	Australia	1948
de Havilland Hercules	UK	1926
Dornier Do 24	Germany	1937
Dornier Y	Germany	1930
Dyle et Bacalan DB-70	France	1929
EMSCO B-2	US	1929
Fabre Trimoteur	France	1908-9
Farman F.120	France	1926
Farman F.280	France	1931
Farman F.300	France	1930
Farman F.301	France	1930
Farman F.303	France	1930
Farman F.304	France	1931
Farman F.306	France	1931
Farman F.310	France	1931
Felixstowe Porte Baby	UK	1916
Fiat BRG	Italy	1931
Fiat G.2	Italy	1932
Fiat G.12	Italy	1940
Fiat G.212	Italy	1947
Fokker F.10	US	1927
Fokker F.VIIA/3m & F.VIIB/3m	Netherlands	1925
Fokker F.IX	Netherlands	1929
Fokker F.XII	Netherlands	1930
Fokker F.XVIII	Netherlands	1932
Fokker F.XX	Netherlands	1933
Ford 4-AT/9-AT/11-AT Trimotor	US	1926
Ford 5-AT/6-AT Trimotor	US	1929
Ford 14-AT	US	1932
Ford XB-906	US	1931
Grahame-White Ganymede	UK	1919
Handley Page Type W.8e/f & W.9a	UK	1921
Handley Page H.P.32 Hamlet	UK	1926
Handley Page H.P.43	UK	1932
Helmy Aerogypt	UK	1939
Hise Model A	US	1929
Hodkinson HT-1	US	1929
Johns Multiplane	US	1919
Junkers G 24	Germany	1924
Junkers G 31	Germany	1926
Junkers Ju 52/3m	Germany	1932
Junkers Ju 252	Germany	1941
Junkers Ju 352	Germany	1943
Kawanishi H3K	Japan	1930
Keystone Pathfinder	US	1927
Keystone Patrician	US	1929
Kreutzer Air Coach	US	1928
LWF model H Owl	US	1920
Lasco Lascondor	Australia	1930
Latécoère 4	France	1920
Latécoère 5	France	1924
Latécoère 24	France	1927
Latécoère 340	France	1930
Latécoère 350	France	1931
Latécoère 500 & 501	France	1932
Latécoère 582	France	1935
Latham Trimotor	France	1919
Lawson L-4	US	1924
Letov Š-32	Czechoslovakia	1931
Lioré et Olivier LeO H-15	France	1926
Loire 30	France	1932
Loire 60	France	1932
Loire 70	France	1933
Loring-Barrón Colonial T-III Trimotor	Spain	1932
Macchi M.C.100	Italy	1939
Nieuport-Delage NiD.590	France	1932
Nieuport-Delage NiD.740	France	1930
Northrop N-23 Pioneer	US	1946
Northrop C-125 Raider	US	1949
NVI F.K.33	Netherlands	1925
Oeffag G6 aka Pola 'G'	Austria-Hungary	1916
Ogden Osprey	US	1930
P.Z.L. 27	Poland	1934
P.Z.L. 4	Poland	1932
Pander S-4 Postjäger	Netherlands	1933
Piaggio P.16	Italy	1934
Piaggio P.23R	Italy	1936
Piper PA-32-3M prototype	US	1966
Potez X	France	1922
Potez 40	France	1930
Prudden TM-1	US	1928
Prudden-Whitehead monoplane	US	1930
Renard R.30	Belgium	1931
Renard R.35	Belgium	1935
Rohrbach Roland	Germany	1926
Rohrbach Romar	Germany	1928
Romano R-16	France	1933
Ryan Navion one off modification	US	1961
SABCA S.11	Belgium	1931
Saunders Severn	UK	1930
Saunders Valkyrie	UK	1926
Saro Windhover	UK	1930
Savoia-Marchetti S.66	Italy	1931
Savoia-Marchetti S.71	Italy	1930
Savoia-Marchetti S.72	Italy	1934
Savoia-Marchetti S.73	Italy	1934
Savoia-Marchetti SM.75	Italy	1937
Savoia-Marchetti SM.79	Italy	1934
Savoia-Marchetti SM.81	Italy	1934
Savoia-Marchetti SM.82	Italy	1939
Savoia-Marchetti SM.83	Italy	1937
Savoia-Marchetti SM.84	Italy	1940
Short S.8 Calcutta	UK	1928
Short Rangoon	UK	1930
Short Valetta	UK	1930
Siemens-Schuckert R.I	Germany	1915
Siemens-Schuckert R.II	Germany	1915
Siemens-Schuckert R.III	Germany	1915
Siemens-Schuckert R.IV	Germany	1916
Siemens-Schuckert R.V	Germany	1916
Siemens-Schuckert R.VI	Germany	1916
Siemens-Schuckert R.VII	Germany	1917
Sikorsky S-35	US	1926
SPCA 40T	France	1929
SPCA 90	France	1932
SPCA Météore 63	France	1925
Spartan Cruiser	UK	1932
Stinson Model A	US	1934
Stinson Model T/SM-6000	US	1930
Stinson Model U	US	1932
Stout 3-AT	US	1926
Stout Bushmaster 2000	US	1964
Supermarine Air Yacht	UK	1930
Supermarine Nanok/Solent	UK	1927
Tellier 1100 ch/T7/Nieuport-Tellier TM	France	1919
Tupolev ANT-9	USSR	1929
Tupolev MTB-1	USSR	1934
Vickers Viastra	UK	1929
Westland IV & Wessex	UK	1930
Weymann 66	France	1933
Wibault 280	France	1930
Zenith Albatross	US	1927
Zeppelin-Lindau Rs.I	Germany	1915
Zeppelin-Lindau Rs.II	Germany	1916

== See also ==
- Trijet
