= Caudron C.37 =

French three-engined biplane passenger transport

General information
- Type: Six passenger airliner
- National origin: France
- Manufacturer: Caudron
- Designer: Paul Deville

History
- First flight: 1920

The Caudron C.37 was a French three-engined biplane passenger transport, built in 1920. It could carry six passengers.

== Design and development ==
Between 1919 and 1922 Caudron built a series of multi-engined civil passenger transport biplanes of similar design but increasing size and engine power, the C.33, C.37, C.39, C.43 and C.61. The C.37 was the first trimotor in this series.

The C.37 was a three bay biplane with fabric-covered, rectangular-plan wings mounted without stagger. The lower wing had dihedral outboard of the engines, and the upper carried the ailerons, which were not balanced as they were on the later aircraft. The wings were joined by vertical pairs of interplane struts, the forward members attached near the leading edges, and the centre section was supported by similar, shorter cabane struts from the upper fuselage. Each inner bay was defined by two close pairs of leaning interplane struts, supporting an 60 kW (80 hp) Le Rhône 9C nine-cylinder rotary engine about halfway between the wings. Each wing-mounted engine was in a long, tapered cowling, open at the rear. There was a third cowled Le Rhône in the nose. The airliner could fly on only two engines when carrying six passengers.

Behind the engine the fuselage was flat-sided, with a wide, open cockpit with its windscreen immediately under the upper leading edge. With a useful load of 450 kg (992 lb) the C.37 was capable of carrying six passengers, though it is not certain if windows or seats were fitted. Behind the wings the fuselage tapered gently to a broad, triangular fin which carried a vertical-edged rudder that reached down to the keel. The tailplane was mounted on top of the fuselage so its elevators had a notch for rudder movement.

The C.37 had a fixed tailskid undercarriage. There were pairs of main wheels mounted on single axles attached at their centre to a longitudinal bar held under the engine at each end on short, forward-raked V-struts. To prevent nose-overs, there was a fifth wheel mounted under the nose.

== Specifications ==
Data from Hauet (2001) p.145

General characteristics

- Crew: Two
- Capacity: Six seat passengers
- Length: 11.60 m (38 ft 1 in)
- Wingspan: 17.00 m (55 ft 9 in)
- Height: 3.90 m (12 ft 10 in)
- Wing area: 65 m^{2} (700 sq ft)
- Empty weight: 1,300 kg (2,866 lb)
- Gross weight: 2,100 kg (4,630 lb)
- Fuel capacity: 350 kg (772 lb)
- Powerplant: 3 × Le Rhône 9C 9-cylinder air-cooled rotary engines, 60 kW (80 hp) each
- Propellers: 2-bladed

Performance

- Maximum speed: 150 km/h (93 mph, 81 kn)
- Endurance: 5 hr
