= Caudron C.33 =

French twin engined biplane

General information
- Type: Three seat passenger transport
- National origin: France
- Manufacturer: Caudron
- Designer: Paul Deville
- Number built: 2

History
- First flight: 1919-20

The Caudron C.33 "Landaulet Monsieur-Madame" was a French twin engined biplane with four seats, two in open cockpits and two in an enclosed cabin.

== Design and development ==
Between 1919 and 1922 Caudron built a series of multi-engined civil passenger transport biplanes of similar design but increasing size and engine power, the C.33, C.37, C.39, C.43 and C.61. The C.33 was the only twin engined aircraft in the series and the smallest in span and passenger capacity, while the others had three or five engines. Rather than being a small airliner taking paying passengers, the Landaulet Monsieur-Madame was intended as the equivalent of a chauffeur driven car carrying a couple and one other member of the household, as its name suggested.

The C.33 was a three bay biplane with fabric covered, rectangular plan wings mounted without stagger. Only the shorter lower wings had dihedral, which began outboard of the engines. The wings were joined by vertical pairs of interplane struts, the forward members attached near the leading edges, and the centre section was supported by similar, shorter cabane struts from the upper forward fuselage. Each inner bay was defined by two close pairs of parallel interplane struts, supporting a 60 kW (80 hp) Le Rhône 9C nine cylinder rotary engine between them, about halfway between the wings. Each wing mounted engine was in a long, tapered cowling, open at the rear. Fuel was held in wedge shaped tanks within the cowlings, their horizontal rear edges visible from behind. Each held 100 L (22 imp gal; 26 US gal). Both upper and lower wings carried ailerons, which were not balanced.

The fuselage of the C.33 was rectangular in section. Two open cockpits were located in tandem in the wedge shaped nose. A passenger sat in front with the pilot behind. Behind the pilot there was an enclosed cabin, with a window on each side and a port side door. It contained a pair of upholstered wicker chairs mounted on swivels.

Behind the wings the fuselage tapered gently to a broad, triangular fin which carried a vertical edged balanced rudder that reached down to the keel. The tailplane was mounted on top of the fuselage so its elevators had a notch for rudder movement. The C.37 had a fixed tailskid undercarriage. There were pairs of main wheels mounted on single axles attached at their centre to a longitudinal bar held under the engine at each end on short, forward raked V-struts.

The Landaulet Monsieur-Madame probably first flew late in 1919 or early in the next year. It was on display at the Paris Aero Show of 1919, though possibly unflown. Two appeared on the French civil register, remaining on it until 1931.

== Specifications ==
Data from Hauet (2001) p.143

General characteristics

- Crew: One pilot
- Capacity: Three passengers
- Length: 9.35 m (30 ft 8 in)
- Upper wingspan: 15.50 m (50 ft 10 in)
- Lower wingspan: 14.20 m (46 ft 7 in)
- Height: 3.00 m (9 ft 10 in)
- Wing area: 46.75 m^{2} (503.2 sq ft)
- Empty weight: 885 kg (1,951 lb)
- Gross weight: 1,385 kg (3,053 lb)
- Fuel capacity: 200 L (44 imp gal; 53 US gal) and 42 L (9 imp gal; 11 US gal) oil
- Useful load: 316 kg (697 lb)
- Powerplant: 2 × Le Rhône 9C 9-cylinder air-cooled rotary engine, 60 kW (80 hp) each
- Propellers: 2-bladed

Performance

- Maximum speed: 130 km/h (81 mph, 70 kn)
- Endurance: 6 hr
