= C39 =

C39 or C-39 may refer to:

== Vehicles ==
Aircraft

- Caudron C.39, a French passenger biplane
- Cessna C-39, an American civil utility aircraft
- Douglas C-39, an American military transport aircraft

Ships

- HMS Devonshire (C39), a County-class cruiser of the Royal Navy

Surface vehicles

- Alfa Romeo Racing C39, an Italian Formula One car
- GE C39-8, a diesel electric locomotive
- Marshall C39, a British bus

== Other uses ==
- C39 road (Namibia)
- Caldwell 39, a planetary nebula
- King's Gambit, a chess opening
