= Caudron C.25 =

Large, three-engined, biplane airliner

General information
- Type: 16–18-passenger airliner
- National origin: France
- Manufacturer: Caudron
- Designer: Paul Deville

The Caudron C.25 was a large, three-engined, biplane airliner, designed and built in France soon after the end of World War I. Its enclosed cabin could accommodate up to eighteen passengers.

== Design and development ==
After the end of world War I, some Caudron C.23s, a large trimotor night bomber, were modified to act as passenger aircraft, but the C.25 was the first aircraft Caudron had designed from the beginning to carry passengers. It was large, with a 25 m (82 ft 0 in) span, so Caudron built in hinges to allow the wings to be folded for easier handling on the ground. The wings were rectangular in plan, mounted without stagger and fabric covered. It was a three-bay biplane with unusually thin, wooden, parallel, vertical interplane struts, assisted by flying wires of thicker than usual gauge. The engine mountings, two pairs of parallel struts, defined the inner bay. The outer pair of these struts were doubled since this was where the wing folded, and so the ends of the wing either side of the fold retained their struts. Four vertical cabane struts braced the centre of the upper wing from the upper fuselage. There were ailerons on both lower and lower planes, extending over more than half the span. These were not aerodynamically balanced in the usual way but were connected to each other by three vertical rods which halfway up were hinged to the trailing edge of a narrower and shorter horizontal surface which rotated about an axis well behind its aerodynamic centre. The wires from the cockpit operated these ancillary surfaces, which then moved the ailerons, just as the leading edge of a conventional balanced aileron, extending forward of the hinge, assists the pilot's input.

The Caudron C.23 was powered by three 186 kW (250 hp) Salmson 9Z nine cylinder water-cooled radial engines, each neatly cowled. Two were mounted halfway between the wings in flat-sided nacelles which curved to a point at the rear and the third was nose-mounted. The wing-mounted engines had fuel tanks in the nacelles, and the nose engine was served by a tank behind it. Behind it the fuselage was rectangular in section and plywood covered to the rear of the passenger cabin, after which it was fabric covered. The two crew sat in separate, wide, side-by-side open cockpits in the upper part of the fuselage ahead of the wing leading edge. The protrusion of their cockpits into the lower fuselage divided the passenger space into a main cabin behind and a smaller one forwards, accessed by ducking under the bottom of the cockpits. The interior had large windows and was carefully furnished, with wicker armchairs and tables, lighting and decorated walls; a toilet was provided.

The horizontal tail was a biplane unit with the lower tailplane attached to the bottom of the fuselage and the upper one on top of a small, shallow fin. The rectangular tailplanes were braced together by two interplane struts on each side; both were rectangular and carried elevators. Three rudders occupied the gap between the elevators, the tips cut away for elevator movement. Only the outer rudders were balanced, but these were directly connected to the central one, assisting it. The C.25 had fixed tailskid conventional landing gear with main wheels in pairs under each engine, assisted by another pair under the nose to prevent nose overs.

The C.25 was on display at the Paris Aero Show in 1919, though it may not have flown by then. Little is recorded on its subsequent history.

== Specifications ==
Data from Hauet (2001) p.142

General characteristics

- Crew: One pilot plus second pilot/engineer/ radio operator
- Capacity: 16-18
- Length: 19.00 m (62 ft 4 in)
- Wingspan: 25.00 m (82 ft 0 in)
- Height: 5.45 m (17 ft 11 in)
- Wing area: 155 m^{2} (1,670 sq ft)
- Empty weight: 3,400 kg (7,496 lb)
- Gross weight: 5,500 kg (12,125 lb)
- Powerplant: 3 × Salmson 9Z water-cooled 9-cylinder radial, 190 kW (250 hp) each
- Propellers: 2-bladed

Performance

- Maximum speed: 165 km/h (103 mph, 89 kn) at sea level
- Endurance: 6 hr
