= Hise Model A =

1929 trimotor aircraft, only one built

Model A

General information
- Type: Trimotor aircraft
- National origin: United States of America
- Manufacturer: Hise
- Designer: Fred H. Hise
- Status: only a single prototype was built
- Number built: 1

History
- First flight: 1929

The Hise Model A was a trimotor aircraft built by the Hise Aircraft Corporation, founded by Detroit, Michigan industrialist Fred Hise. The Vice President of the company, E.L. Inlow, announced that a manufacturing facility was planned for Pontiac, Michigan within a few months of August, 1929. The prototype was shown at the 1929 National Aeronautic Exposition, held at Cleveland from August 24 to September 2, 1929. On March 17, 1930, the company entered into a contract with the Dixie and Northern Air Line for the purchase of 5 aircraft, with the first of the planes to be delivered on or before August 5, 1930. The airline was organized to provide passenger service between Detroit and Miami, at the time one of the longest routes in the United States. However, the planned $100,000 (equivalent to $1,880,000 in 2024) sale was never completed after the airline's authorization to issue stock was revoked by the Michigan Public Utilities Commission when it objected to the airline's plans to spend all of the stock sale proceeds on the new aircraft, leaving nothing for operations.

== Design and development ==
The single prototype was tested at the Detroit City Airport.

The Hise Trimotor was a high-wing monoplane with conventional landing gear. It was powered by three 125 hp (93 kW) Kinner radial engines. The executive interior featured red leather seats and silver-plated ashtrays.

== Specifications (Hise Model A) ==
Data from Technical Aspects of the Cleveland Exposition

General characteristics

- Capacity: 6
- Length: 30 ft 10 in (9.40 m)
- Wingspan: 52 ft 0 in (15.85 m)
- Wing area: 378 sq ft (35.1 m^{2})
- Empty weight: 2,625 lb (1,191 kg)
- Gross weight: 4,350 lb (1,973 kg)
- Powerplant: 3 × Kinner K-5 five-cylinder radial engines, 100 hp (75 kW) each
