= Breda Ba.32 =

Ba.32
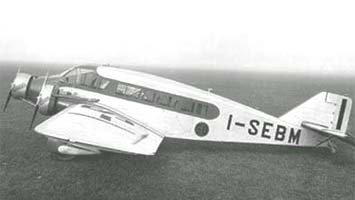
- The sole Ba.32 prototype

General information
- Type: Airliner
- Manufacturer: Breda
- Number built: 2?(second, with FIAT engines, may have been a conversion)

History
- First flight: 1931

The Breda Ba.32 was a prototype airliner designed and built by the Italian aircraft manufacturer Breda.

It was a low-wing trimotor monoplane with fixed, spatted main landing gear. The Ba.32 was powered by three Pratt & Whitney R-985 Wasp Junior nine-cylinder air-cooled radial engines. It was operated by a crew of two while its cabin could accommodate up to 10 passengers.

The prototype Ba.32 conducted its maiden flight in 1931; it demonstrated favourable flying characteristics during flight testing. However, no production orders were ever received, thus no production standard aircraft were ever built.

== Design and development ==
The Breda 32 incorporated numerous cutting edge aerodynamic and construction features for the era. The search for aerodynamic cleanness were uncompromised other necessities, such as the appropriate provision of structural members. Various comfortable furnishings were also present in order to satisfy operational requirements in full. The fuselage had relatively clean and aerodynamically perfect lines. Its shape was influenced by a series of experiments conducted during the development of the Breda CC.20 as well as extensive wind tunnel testing performed for the Breda 32 specifically. The shaping of various features, such as the cowling of the central engine (which enclosed the exhaust manifold), the windshield and the upper portion of the cockpit, were directed by their favourable penetration characteristics.

The aircraft was furnished with a low-mounted cantilever wing had a relatively high aspect ratio and tapered in both planform and thickness throughout the entire length of the wing. Except for a reduction in scale, the wing of the Ba.32 was almost identical to that of a larger trimotor aircraft that the company was designing around the same time. This wing had been designed to obtain the maximum achievable aerodynamic efficiency along with a high degree of stability. Specifically, lateral stability was largely achieved via a pronounced dihedral angle while effective lateral control was obtained by a set of sizable ailerons that took up roughly half of the wing's trailing edge, the hinges of which were aligned so to achieve a partial aerodynamic balance.

The streamlined nacelles of the two outboard engines were faired into the wing, while the propellers were placed well ahead of the leading edge, helping to diminish the induced drag as well as making for smooth working and minimal interference. The axes of the outboard engines were slightly inclined towards one other, which increased the effectiveness of the fin and rudder while also slightly offsetting the uneven torque present in the event of one of the outboard engines stopping. The fixed surfaces of the tail unit were relatively thin and braced using a series of streamlined steel struts, wires and bars. The framework of each tail surface comprised a pair of spars of stamped duralumin that were riveted to duralumin ribs along with a metal covering. Both the rudder and elevator were aerodynamically balanced.

The landing gear consisted of two wheels, located underneath the outboard engines, that were partially enclosed in fairings and produced relatively little interference with the wing. The landing wheels are provided with brakes that were actuated using compressed air, these could be differentially operated across the two wheels; this flexible operation, along with the generous distance between the aircraft wheels, permitted the airplane to perform relatively short turns while on the ground. A shock-absorbing strut attachment was also present. A tail wheel with a balloon tyre was mounted on a swivelling fork.

The Ba.32 featured all-metal construction for both its framework and exterior. The structure of the fuselage consisted of four tubular longerons, which were composed of steel, that worked in conjunction with a series of lattice frames (made of duralumin) to which the metal covering was riveted, the latter bolstering rigidity. The primary structural elements of the fuselage were similar to that of the wing spar. The various sections of both the fuselage and wing were connected via spherical joints, which permitted the aircraft to be readily taken apart and transported by rail. The wing structure consisted of a single square-section spar along with numerous ribs and the covering itself; their design was innovative at the time, to the extent that multiple patents were involved. This spar was positioned in the thickest part of the wing and offered relatively high resistance to both torsional and bending stresses. The ribs, which were composed of stamped light sheet duralumin, directly attached to either side of the spar. The covering of the wing was riveted to the flanges of the ribs; sufficient rigidity was achieved via the presence of compact corrugations that had been stamped into the metal. Static tests (of both elasticity and strength) were conducted on various elements of the wing structure; these determined that the exterior covering increased the overall strength of the wing.

The Ba.32 was powered by an arrangement of three Pratt & Whitney Wasp Junior nine-cylinder radial engines. Each of these air-cooled engines were provided with a device for regulating the cooling of the crankcase, this keeping the oil temperature within the engines within appropriate limits. Each engine had a twin-bladed metal propeller that was adjustable on the ground. Each engine was mounted on a bearer via a set of bolts, rubber sockets, and buffers. These engine bearers, which were composed of welded steel tubing, were joined to the fuselage or the wing spar (dependent on the location of the engine) via four steel bolts. The engine cowlings were also mounted on the bearers and thus were independent of the fuselage and wing. All of the cowls could be easily opened via several hooks. Numerous inspection ports were present across the wing and underneath the fuselage to check on piping and controls alike. The oil systems of the different engines are independent of one another and were air-cooled.

The fuel tanks were located within the wing in separately ventilated compartments outboard of the engines. Each tank was provided with a dump valve, controlled by the pilot, as well as stopcocks to control the flow of fuel. The fuel system included a collector pocket (from where the delivery pipes feed the engines), hand pumps, and a pair of gravity tanks that had sufficient capacity to permit continued flight in the event of all other tanks being lost or the pumps failing. The tanks, which were composed of brass, could be readily removed through access ports in the wing covering. Relatively large steel pipes connected each of the tanks together, permitting simultaneous refuelling of all tanks via a single point.

Entry to the passenger cabin was typically achieved via a relatively wide door, although an emergency exit could also be provided at the customer's request. In a typical configuration, the cabin was to have accommodated up to eight passengers upon three chairs set at each side along with a single sofa at the rear, which could seat up to two travellers. Furthermore, up to three central tip-up seats could be installed, thus enabling the carriage of as many as eleven seated passengers in the cabin. The side seats were spaced as to permit the adjustment of their backs for increased comfort. The cabin was lit by two rows of windows along either side of the fuselage; triplex glass panes were present at each window and could be readily opened mid-flight. The cabin was heated via air drawn from the exhaust manifold of the central engine. Both the walls and chairs were upholstered with fabric that was edged with leather, while the cushions and chair backs were stuffed with feathers and covered with a combination of fabric and leather. The floor was carpeted. Overhead baggage racks also present in the cabin. Additional stowage for baggage was provided by a pair of relatively spacious compartments, one forward and the other aft, each with a capacity of 200 kg (441 lb.).

The cockpit provided favourable forward and lateral visibility, the windscreen featuring several adjustable glass windows that enabled the pilots to stick their heads outside if desired. A pair of leather-covered chairs were provided for the two pilots while two smaller chairs were present for the flight engineer and radio operator. The cockpit floor was covered with linoleum while the walls were upholstered with both leather and fabric. Several reflecting lamps were present in the cockpit to provide sufficient illumination for night time operations, the passenger cabin was also provided with indirect lighting. Furthermore, the instrumentation featured luminous figures while the aircraft itself was provided with both landing and navigation lights, these landing lights were usually concealed within the wings and, during landing, were operated from the cockpit by means of a lever. Electricity was provided by a single generator that was driven by the central engine, a sizable battery was also present to supply current in case of generator failure. Uses included powering the compact motors used for starting the engines as well as for the lighting and radio set, the latter was provisioned with both a movable and a fixed antenna. The navigation instruments fulfilled all requirement for flying within inhospitable weather conditioned and permitted blind piloting.

== Operators ==
Kingdom of Italy

== Specifications (Ba.32) ==
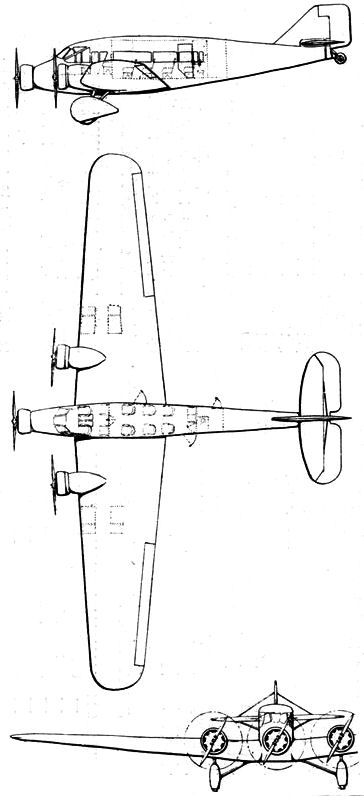
Breda Ba.32 3-view drawing from L'Aerophile March 1932

Data from Italian Civil and Military aircraft 1930–1945, National Advisory Committee for Aeronautics

General characteristics

- Crew: 2
- Capacity: 8–11
- Length: 16.749 m (54 ft 11.4 in)
- Wingspan: 26.67 m (87 ft 6 in)
- Height: 4.153 m (13 ft 7.5 in)
- Wing area: 84.97 m^{2} (914.6 sq ft)
- Empty weight: 3,792 kg (8,360 lb)
- Gross weight: 6,441 kg (14,200 lb)
- Powerplant: 3 × Pratt & Whitney Wasp Junior nine-cylinder air-cooled radial piston engine, 240 kW (320 hp) each

Performance

- Maximum speed: 237 km/h (147 mph, 128 kn)
- Cruise speed: 211 km/h (131 mph, 114 kn)
- Stall speed: 93 km/h (58 mph, 50 kn)
- Range: 1,350 km (840 mi, 730 nmi)
- Endurance: Eight hours
- Service ceiling: 5,300 m (17,400 ft)
- Rate of climb: 1.6 m/s (310 ft/min)
- Time to altitude: 16,400 in 52 minutes

== See also ==
Aircraft of comparable role, configuration, and era

- Fokker F.VII
- Junkers Ju 52
