= Breda CC.20 =

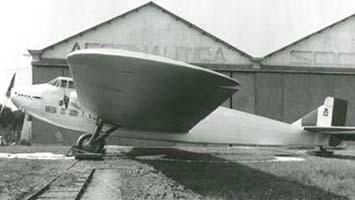

General information
- Type: Heavy bomber
- Manufacturer: Breda
- Designer: Ing Gaetano Crocco and Ing Giulio Cesare Costanzi
- Primary user: Italy
- Number built: 1

History
- First flight: 1929

A Breda Ba.19 trainer under the wing of the CC.20.

The Breda CC.20 was an Italian heavy bomber prototype of 1929 designed and built by the Breda company.

== Design and development ==
Ing Gaetano Crocco and Ing Giulio Cesare Costanzi designed the CC.20 -- "CC" for the surnames of the two engineers—which was Breda's first monoplane bomber. The seven-seat trimotor mid-wing monoplane CC.20 was powered by three 373 kW (500 hp) Isotta Fraschini Asso 500 engines and had a powerful defensive armament of one 25 mm (0.984 in) cannon and seven 7.7 mm (0.303 in) machine guns.

The CC.20 prototype first flew in 1929 and test flights showed it to be very slow with a short range; Breda abandoned the project.

== Operators ==
Kingdom of Italy

== Specifications ==
General characteristics

- Crew: 7
- Wingspan: 42 m (137 ft 10 in)
- Empty weight: 7,700 kg (16,976 lb)
- Gross weight: 12,000 kg (26,455 lb)
- Powerplant: 3 × Isotta Fraschini Asso 500 V-12 liquid-cooled piston engines, 373 kW (500 hp) each

Performance

- Maximum speed: 185 km/h (115 mph, 100 kn)
- Cruise speed: 155 km/h (96 mph, 84 kn)

Armament

- 1 x 25-millimeter cannon
- 7 x 7.7-millimeter (0.303-inch) machine guns
