= Breda Ba.46 =

Ba.46
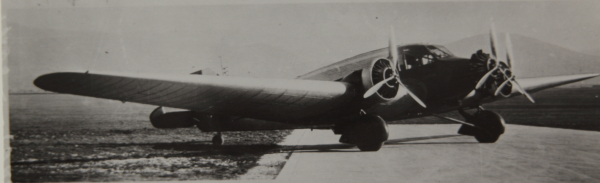

General information
- Type: bomber/troop transport
- National origin: Italy
- Manufacturer: Società Italiana Ernesto Breda
- Number built: 1

History
- First flight: 1934

The Breda Ba.46 was a three-engined Italian bomber transport, developed from a similar but lower-powered civil transport. It was designed in Italy in the mid-1930s for colonial policing but not put into production.

== Design and development ==
The Breda Ba.46, which first flew in 1934, was a military development of the Ba.32 8-11 seat airliner from two years earlier. The Ba.46 was designed to fill a colonial policing rôle with an aircraft capable both of bombing and troop transportation. Troop/bombload mixtures could range from 12 men and 1,000 kg (2,200 lb) of bombs of weights 100 kg (220 lb), 250 kg (550 lb) and 500 kg (1,100 lb), up to a maximum bombload of 2,000 kg (4,400 lb) without troops.

Both the Ba.32 and Ba.46 were three engine, cantilever low wing monoplanes with fixed, conventional undercarriages. Since the Ba.46's military equipment, chiefly bombs and defensive armament, raised the all-up weight by some 45%, it was re-engined with 650 hp (485 kW) Alfa Romeo-built Bristol Pegasus radials which provided more than twice the power of the Ba.32's Pratt and Whitney Wasp Juniors. Wing span and area were also increased, by 12% and 22% respectively. Other dimensions remained the same. As a result, the Ba.46 was quicker both in level flight and particularly in the climb, reaching 5,000 m in 18 minutes rather than the B.32's 52 minutes.

The cockpit of the Ba.46 was enclosed and the fuselage had side windows. There were four machine gun positions, two dorsal and two ventral. Bombs were stored internally, each weight in its own bay and above separate doors. The Ba.46 had a braced tailplane positioned on top of the fuselage and a single fin. The wide-spaced mainwheels were spatted; the outer engines were faired with Townend rings, the central one remaining uncowled.

The Breda Ba.46 made its first flight in 1934, by which time the company's focus had moved to more modern, retractable undercarriage and single-purpose bomber designs for European wars; there was no further development.

== Specifications ==
Data from Italian Civil and Military Aircraft 1930-45

General characteristics

- Capacity: 12 troops
- Length: 16.75 m (54 ft 11 in)
- Wingspan: 30.00 m (98 ft 5 in)
- Height: 4.153 m (13 ft 7.5 in)
- Wing area: 104.0 m^{2} (1,119 sq ft)
- Empty weight: 5,488 kg (12,100 lb)
- Max takeoff weight: 9,280 kg (20,460 lb)
- Powerplant: 3 × Alfa Romeo 125 RC.35 (licence built Bristol Pegasus) radial, 480 kW (650 hp) each

Performance

- Maximum speed: 315 km/h (196 mph, 170 kn) at 5,000 m (16,400 ft)
- Cruise speed: 259 km/h (161 mph, 140 kn) at 3,000 m (9,840 ft)
- Range: 2,000 km (1,243 mi, 1,080 nmi) with 1,000 kg (2,200 lb) bombload and no troops.
- Service ceiling: 7,730 m (25,360 ft)
- Time to altitude: 18 min to 5,000 m (16,400 ft)

Armament

- Guns: 3 positions, dorsal forward and ventral forward and aft, each with 1 7.7 mm (0.303 in) Breda-SAFAT machine guns, plus 1 rear upper position with either 2× 7.7 mm (0.303 in) or 1× 12. mm (0.5 in) guns.
- Bombs: 2,000 kg (4,400 lb) with no troops; 1,000 kg (2,200 lb) with 12 troops

== See also ==
Related lists

- List of bomber aircraft
