= Latécoère 5 =

General information
- Type: Heavy bomber
- National origin: France
- Manufacturer: Latécoère (La societe industrielle d'aviation Latécoère)
- Designer: Marcel Moine and P.G.Latécoère
- Number built: 1

History
- First flight: 18 February 1924
- Developed from: Latécoère 4

The Latécoère 5 was a French three-engined biplane bomber prototype of the early 1920s, based on the Latécoère 4 passenger aircraft. It did not fly until 1924 and only one was built.

== Design and development ==
The Latécoère 5 was a revision of the second Latécoère 4 as a night bomber for the BN4 programme, which called for a 1,500 kg (3,300 lb) bomb load. The construction and general appearance of the two types was similar, both having fabric covered wings of wooden construction, three engines and a metal framed fuselage. The wings and tail of the Latécoère 4 and 5 appeared almost identical, using the single outer interplane strut of the Latécoère 4's early arrangement. In fact the bomber had a span 2 m (6 ft 7 in) greater and larger wing area. The fuselage behind the wing leading edge was again similar; as far as is known the defensive armament intended for the bomber was never fitted, and it had three windows on each side, though not the continuous line of sliding openings seen on the transport. The main differences were in the pilot's cockpit and those that followed from a different choice of engine.

The fuselage was significantly longer (3.3 m or 10 ft 10 in) partly because of the decision to seat pilot and co-pilot side by side and further forward, clear of the wing leading edge. From there, forward to the nose the top of the fuselage was now horizontal, rather than falling away downwards as on the civil aircraft. This change, giving a poorer forward view resulted from fitting the longer inline Lorraine 12 Ds in the bomber rather than the short Salmson radials of the Latécoère 4. A rectangular radiator immediately behind the two-bladed propeller provided cooling, replacing the external radiators of the transport. There was a serious dispute between the State and Latécoère about the engine choice; briefly, the former wished all BN4 machines to use more powerful Renault engines but failed to have them available, whereas Latécoère preferred the Lorraines on the grounds of a better power-to-weight ratio. The outer engines of the bomber were similarly mounted to those of the Latécoère 4 with bracing to the wing roots and fuselage, but in deeper and flatter sided cowlings which extended downward almost to the wing. These outer engines had similar rectangular radiators and propellers to that of the central one.

Though the design was registered in January 1921, the first flight did not take place until 18 February 1924, four years after the Latécoère 4, partly because of the engine disputes. It was flown by Achille Enderlin and Vilet. It was taken to Villacoublay for official testing in the late summer of 1924; its fate thereafter is not known. No more Latécoère 5s were built; though the company considered equipping it as a transport, nothing was done.

== Numbering ==
The first time the aircraft was officially referred to as the Latécoère 5 was in the documentation of the completion of contract in 1925. Before that it was normally termed the "Latécoère 4 (ou IV) BN4", though the initial contract referred to the Latécoère V.

== Specifications ==
Data from Cuny 1992, pp. 40

General characteristics

- Crew: 4
- Length: 18.10 m (59 ft 5 in)
- Wingspan: 26.80 m (87 ft 11 in)
- Height: 6.25 m (20 ft 6 in)
- Wing area: 195 m^{2} (2,100 sq ft)
- Empty weight: 5,230 kg (11,530 lb)
- Gross weight: 8,400 kg (18,519 lb)
- Powerplant: 3 × Lorraine 12D upright V-12 watercooled , 275 kW (370 hp) each

Performance

- Cruise speed: 160 km/h (100 mph, 87 kn)
- Range: 1,400 km (875 mi, 760 nmi)
- Service ceiling: 4,000 m (13,123 ft)
