= Latécoère 4 =

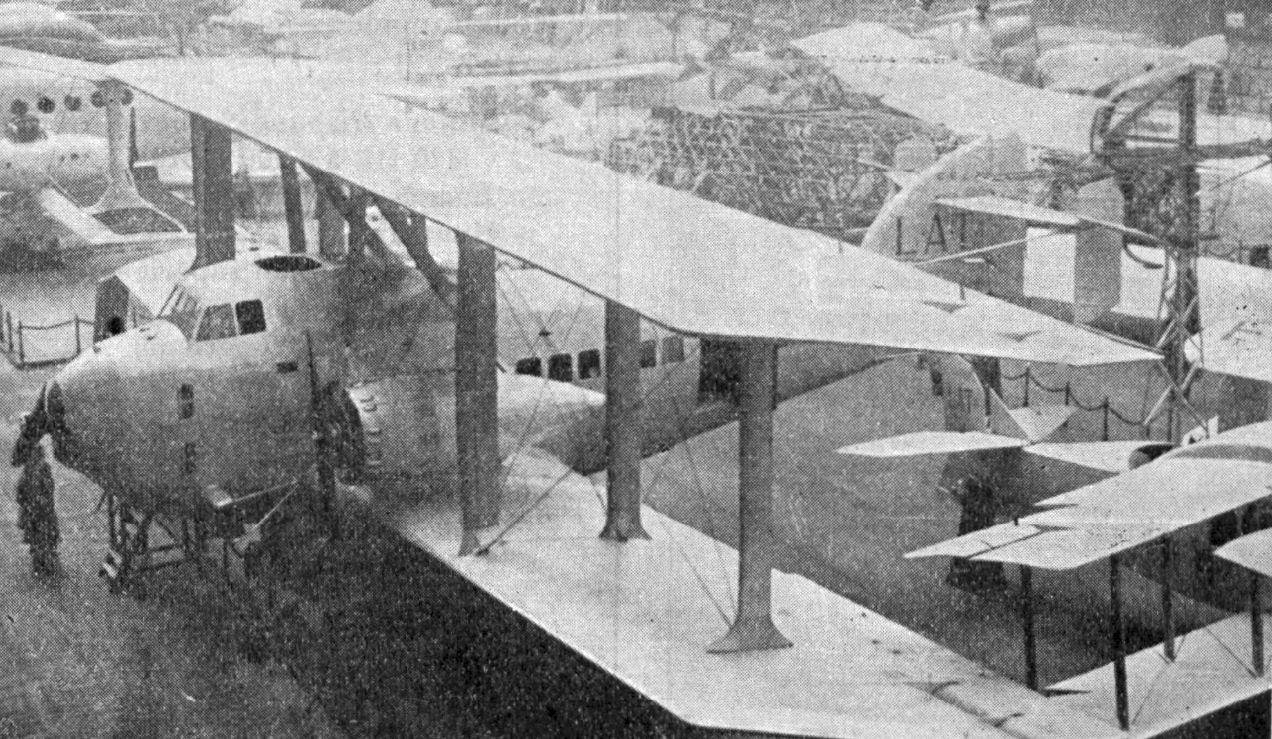
- At the Salon d'Aéronautique in December, 1921

General information
- Type: 16 seat passenger prototype biplane
- National origin: France
- Manufacturer: Latécoère (La societé industrielle d'aviation Latécoère)
- Designer: Marcel Moine and P.G.Latécoère
- Number built: 1

History
- First flight: May 1920
- Variant: Latécoère 5

The Latécoère 4 was a three-engined, 15-passenger biplane built in France in the early 1920s. It proved difficult to fly and was discontinued, though a second machine was completed as the Latécoère 5 bomber.

== Development ==
The Latécoère 4 (referred to in the initial contract as the Latécoère IV) was the company's first multi-engined aircraft, the result of a decision that passenger aircraft needed to be designed from scratch rather than modified from military machines. It was a three-engined, two bay biplane with accommodation for 16 passengers. Its wings had neither stagger nor sweep, but had an unusually large interplane gap. The lower wing, which carried dihedral was fixed to the lower fuselage with a thick wing root, but the upper one was high above the fuselage at its centre, supported by pairs of N form cabane struts. The interplane struts were streamlined and broad in chord, made from duralumin; there was a pair of these struts marking the inner bay but a single strut outboard. The wings, made of wood and fabric covered were of constant chord over most of the span, but final sections where the leading edges swept back produced triangular tips. There were balanced ailerons on both upper and lower planes.

The fuselage in contrast was made of metal. The central Salmson water-cooled radial was mounted in the nose with rectangular radiators mounted on the fuselage forward of and just above the lower wing. The outer engines were also fuselage mounted, each having pairs of struts to the upper fuselage longeron and to the lower ones via the wing roots. Thus they were positioned a little above the lower wing, near to the centre of the inner bay in neatly faired nacelles with circular radiators at the front. The underlying fuselage structure was rectangular in cross-section aft of the leading edge, but faired at its sides and top into a rounder shape. It was deepest between the wings and gave the aircraft a somewhat short, fat look. The pilot sat just forward of the wings, high up and well above the central motor line, with a god view. Below and forward of him were positions for a radio operator and an engineer. The passenger cabin, entered via a port side door had tables, armchairs and sliding windows for thirteen, with another three places accessed forward via a 500 mm wide corridor.

The tail unit was quite complicated with a biplane arrangement of tailplanes and elevators. One of the tailplanes could be adjusted in incidence in flight to trim the aircraft. There was a central fin and rudder rising above the upper tailplane, which had a cut-out to allow the rudder to move, and there were two outboard vertical surfaces, again moving in cut-outs, to assist stability. These latter could be turned in flight to offset asymmetric engine-out forces. The undercarriage was narrow track, with pairs of mainwheels on both sides mounted vertically to the wing and cross braced, with a tailwheel at the rear.

The first flight was made in May 1920, when the aircraft was powered by three identical Salmson 9 Z engines of about 190 kW (255 hp), piloted by Pierre Beauté. The Laté 4 proved hard to control and it crashed on landing at Francazal, injuring its crew. It was rebuilt, though without its passenger cabin windows. It also gained a two-row Salmson 18 Z central engine of double the power of the 9 Zs retained outboard. The central engine drove a four-bladed wooden propeller and the outer pair two-bladed ones. The open cockpit was turned into an enclosed cabin with a corridor aft. It appeared in this form at the Salon d'Aéronautique in December 1921, but did not fly again until some major changes had been made. These included the replacement of the single outboard interplane struts by double ones, an exchange of the rectangular central engine radiators for tubular Lamblin ones and the addition of a substantial additional pair of wheels placed vertically below the engine bulkhead to prevent nose-overs. All engines now drove four-bladed propellers. In this form the Laté 4 flew, piloted by Gronin on 6 September 1922. The aircraft was still unstable and unready to try the intended Toulouse-Casablanca route. On 14 October the aircraft was caught by a gust and crashed, seriously injuring Gronin and his engineer Franck. At this point the civil aircraft was abandoned. In early 1921 a decision had already been made to submit the second Latécoère 4 as a bomber; it became the Latécoère 5.

== Specifications (after final modifications) ==
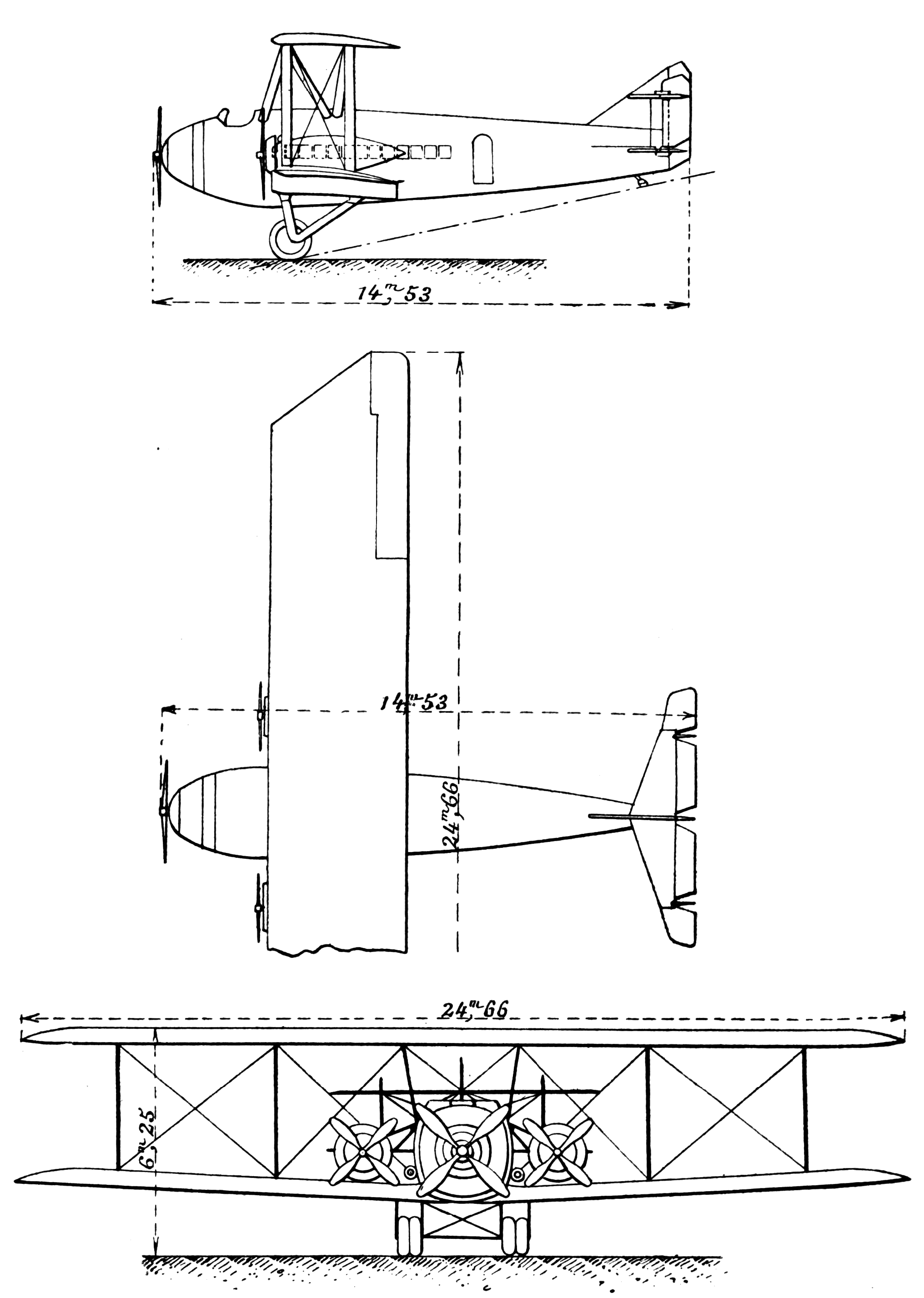
Latécoère 4 3-view drawing from Le Génie Civil December 3,1921

Data from Latécoère: Les avions et hydravions

General characteristics

- Crew: 3
- Capacity: 16
- Length: 14.535 m (47 ft 8 in)
- Wingspan: 24.65 m (80 ft 10 in)
- Height: 6.25 m (20 ft 6 in)
- Wing area: 158 m^{2} (1,700 sq ft)
- Empty weight: 3,615 kg (7,970 lb)
- Gross weight: 8,340 kg (18,387 lb)
- Powerplant: 1 × Salmson 18 Z 18-cylinder two-row water-cooled in-line radial piston engine, centrally mounted., 255 kW (342 hp)
- Powerplant: 2 × Salmson 9 Z 9-cylinder water-cooled radial piston engines, 190 kW (250 hp) each
- Propellers: 4-bladed wooden fixed-pitch propellers

Performance

- Maximum speed: 200 km/h (120 mph, 110 kn)
- Range: 1,100 km (680 mi, 590 nmi)
