= Giulio Costanzi =

Italian space pioneer

- Born: Giulio Cesare Costanzi; 25 April 1875; Contigliano, Italy
- Died: 28 August 1965 (aged 90); Rome, Italy
- Occupation: engineer
- Known for: pioneer of space studies in Italy
- Notable work: To Escape from the Planet (1914)

Giulio Cesare Costanzi (25 April 1875 in Contigliano, Italy – 28 August 1965 in Rome, Italy), was an officer of the ITAF Engineers Corps and a pioneer of space studies in Italy. In 1914, he wrote a paper on space navigation that is regarded as the first Italian contribution to space flights on record.

== Biography ==
Costanzi started his career as a civil engineer, then entered the Army in the Artillery Corps. From 1911, he served as an officer in the Specialized Engineers Corps, the first nucleus of the future Italian Air Force. The Corps manned aerostatic balloons and airships and was equipped with a range of laboratories planned by Gaetano Arturo Crocco, plus a wind tunnel. In World War I, Costanzi headed a squadron of reconnaissance aircraft and in 1923 was put in charge of an experimental section of the Italian Air Force. In 1928, he left the service as a general, was named member of the State Council and from 1938 to 1945 served as president of the Italian Air Registry, the equivalent of the US Federal Aviation Agency.

== The first Italian contribution to space exploration ==
In 1914, in a specialized magazine, Costanzi published an article on navigation in space. It is the first scientific contribution by an Italian to space flight, anticipating many problems related to exploration of outer space. “After the conquest of the air through aircraft, it is high time to abandon Earth and found new colonies in space” he writes, and then expounds the problem of powering spaceships in the void, without any support from the atmosphere, as in the case of airplanes. He advocates space travel on the basis of action-reaction dynamics, plans a flight Earth-Moon and to overcome the force of gravity he postulates the need for a new source of power. He identifies this source with radium and its yet unknown characteristics. In his article, Costanzi describes what would be the dangers and sensations experienced by an astronaut, such as suffering extreme heat, poisonous radiations, G-acceleration and weightlessness, the latter resulting in a feeling of falling. He concludes affirming hopefully that "the obstacles to this last dream are not beyond human reasoning, for the time being we are bound only by the lack of appropriate technology".

== Bibliography ==
- Giulio Costanzi "To Escape from the Planet", AER 5, 1914
- Smithsonian Annals of Flight n. 10
