= Northrop YC-125 Raider =

American utility transport aircraft

YC-125 Raider
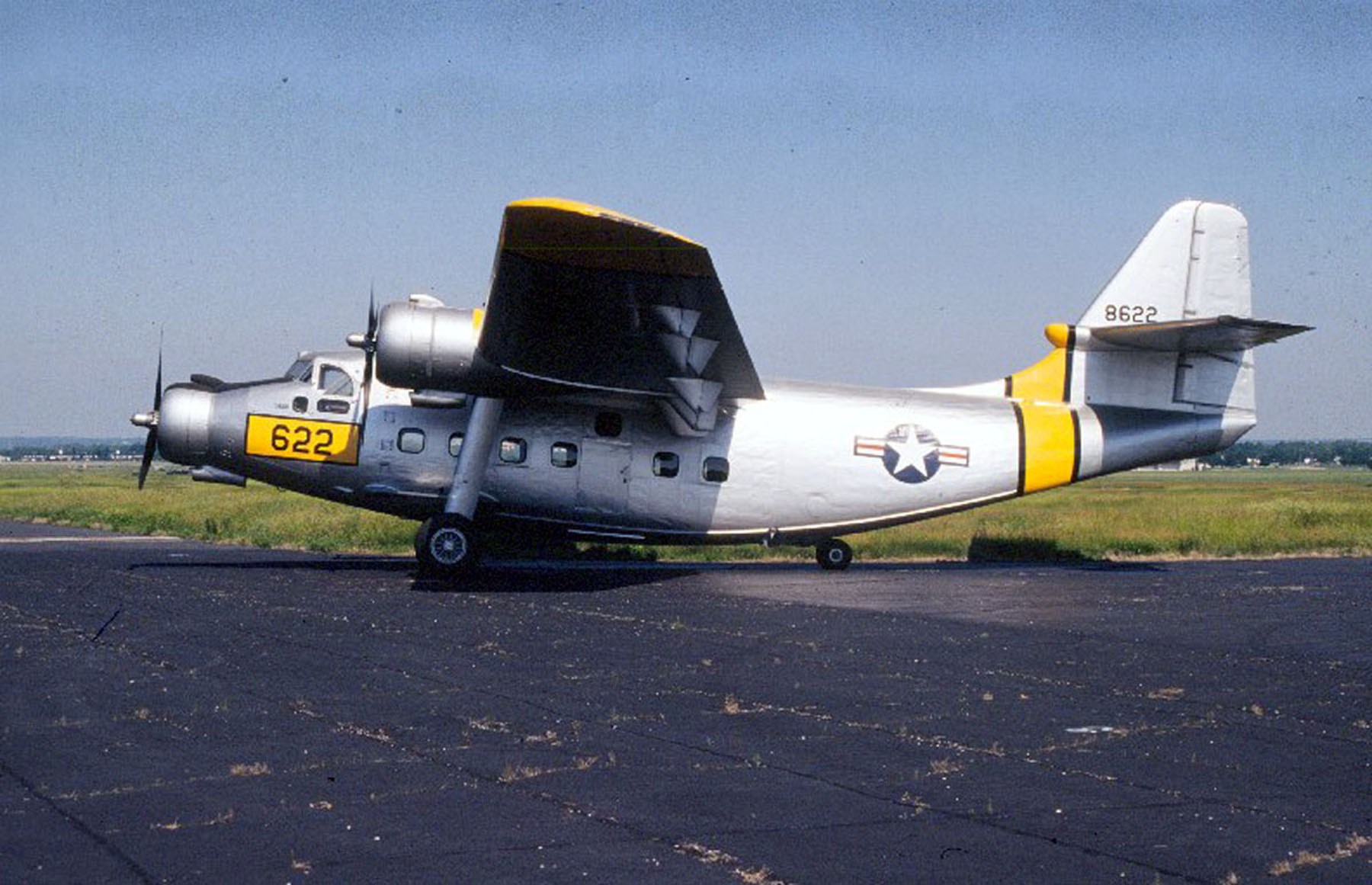

General information
- Type: Transport aircraft
- National origin: United States
- Manufacturer: Northrop Corporation
- Primary user: United States Air Force
- Number built: 23

History
- Manufactured: 1949–1950
- Introduction date: 1950
- First flight: 1 August 1949
- Retired: 1955

The Northrop YC-125 Raider is a 1940s American three-engined STOL utility transport built by Northrop Corporation, Hawthorne, California.

== Design and development ==
Northrop's first postwar civil design was a three-engined STOL passenger and cargo transport named the Northrop N-23 Pioneer, which was intended to replace the Ford Trimotors of the Central American airline Transportes Aéreos Centro Americanos (TACA). The Pioneer could carry 36 passengers or cargo, with a cargo door and a "chin" hatch allowing the loading of 36 ft (11 m) lengths of pipes or timber into the aircraft's cabin. It first flew on 21 December 1946. The aircraft had good performance, resulting in an order of 40 aircraft from TACA, but political maneuvering from Pan-Am after the shipping company Waterman Steamship Corporation purchased a major stake in TACA led to TACA losing rights to operate to or from the United States, which in turn caused TACA to cancel its order for the Pioneer. Despite extensive sales tours, no further orders were obtained. The Pioneer was lost in a fatal crash on 19 February 1948 when it lost a new tailfin design in flight.

In 1948, the United States Air Force expressed interest in an aircraft of the same configuration and placed an order with Northrop for 23 aircraft, 13 troop transports designated the C-125A Raider and 10 for Arctic rescue work designated the C-125B. With the company designation N-32 Raider the first aircraft flew on 1 August 1949.

The aircraft was powered by three 1,200 hp (890 kW) Wright R-1820-99 Cyclone radial engines. The aircraft could also be fitted with JATO rockets that enabled it to take off in less than 500 feet (150 m). The 13 troop transporters were designated YC-125A in-service and the Arctic rescue version the YC-125B.

The Canadian company Canadair considered building the N-23 under licence but did not proceed.

== Operational history ==
Deliveries of the YC-125 to the USAF began in 1950. These aircraft did not serve long as they were underpowered and they were soon sent to Sheppard Air Force Base, Texas and relegated to be ground instructional trainers until retired in 1955 and declared surplus.

Most of the surplus aircraft were purchased by Frank Ambrose and sold to bush operators in South and Central America.

== Variants ==
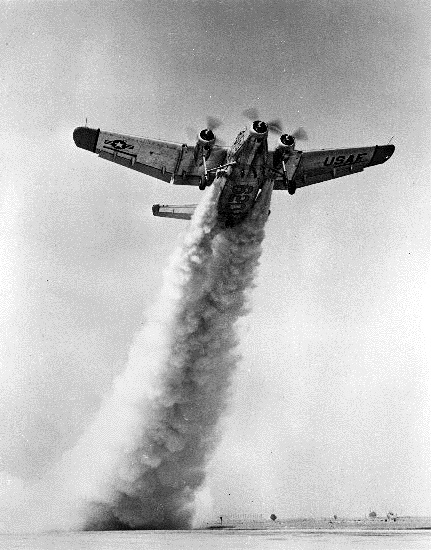
A YC-125 performs a JATO takeoff

N-23 Pioneer
Prototype three-engined STOL transport, one built.
N-32 Raider
Company designation of military version of the N-23.
YC-125A Raider
N-32 with seats for thirty troops, 13 built.
YC-125B Raider
Arctic rescue version of the N-32 with twenty stretchers and provision for a ski undercarriage. Ten built (serials 48-618/627).
CL-3
Proposed Canadair licensed produced variant from 1949, with 3 x Canadian Pratt & Whitney R-1820 engines. Was redesignated CL-12 in the same year. Project was dropped sometime around early 1950.
N-74
Another proposed Canadair variant. Improvements including the replacement of the three engines with two Allison T56 turboprops were studied. Project abandoned in the early 1950s.

== Operators ==
United States

- United States Air Force

== Surviving aircraft ==
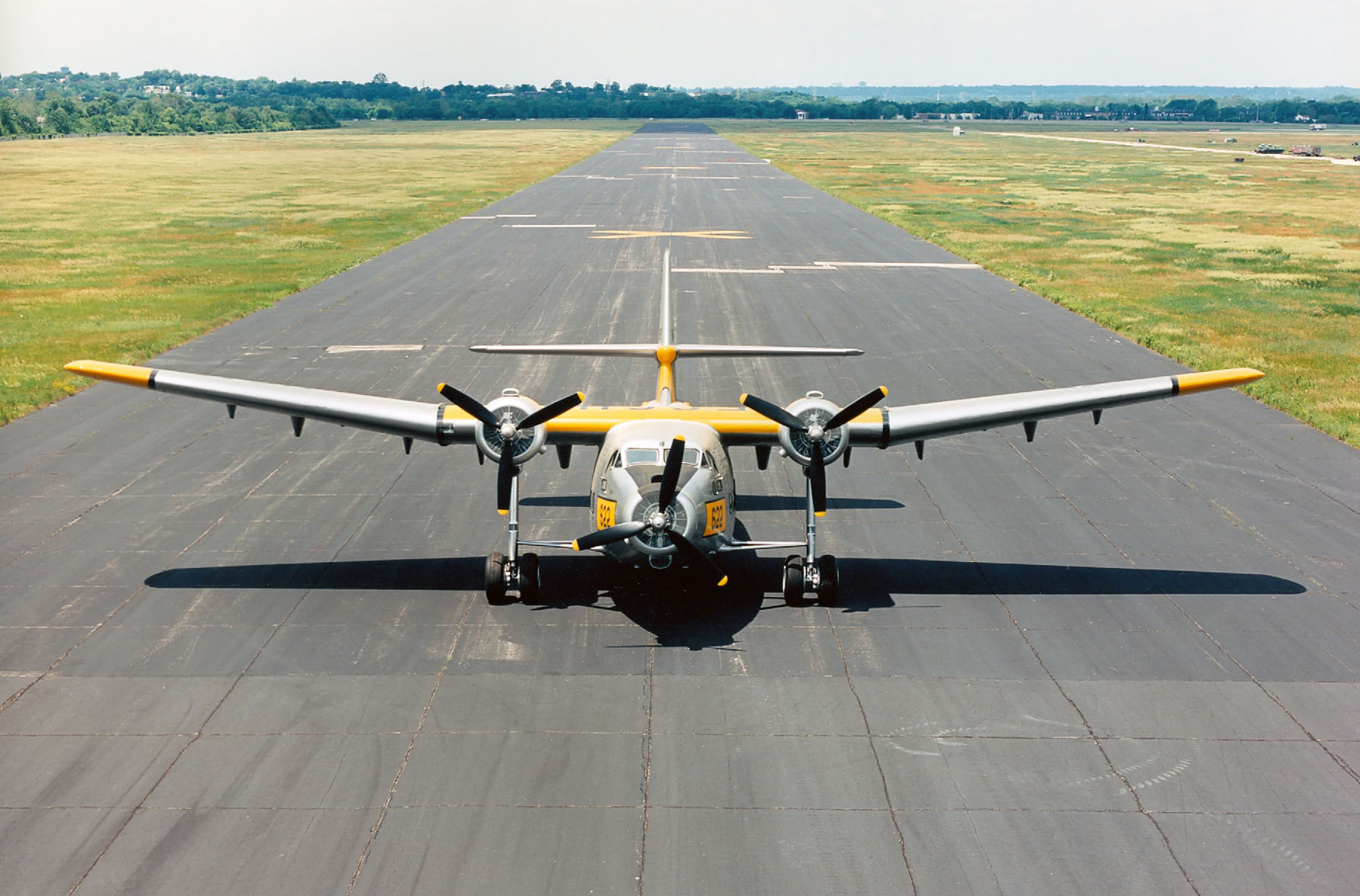
YC-125B at the National Museum of the United States Air Force

- 48-626 – YC-125B in storage at the National Museum of the United States Air Force in Dayton, Ohio.
- 48-636 – YC-125A on static display at the Pima Air and Space Museum in Tucson, Arizona.

== Specifications (YC-125B) ==
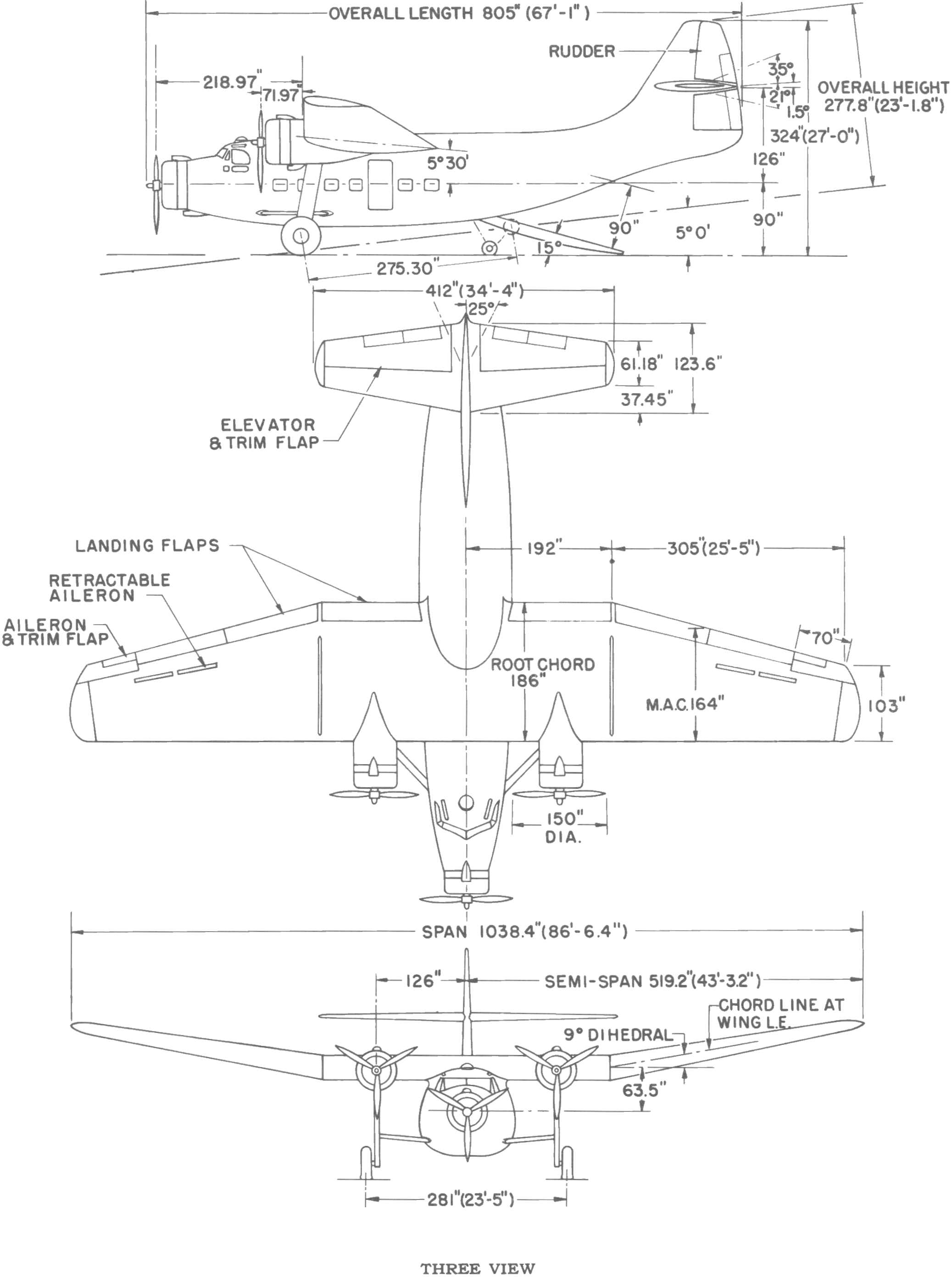
3-view line drawing of the Northrop YC-125 Raider

Data from National Museum of the US Air Force YC-125B Factsheet & American Military Transport Aircraft Since 1925

General characteristics

- Crew: 4
- Capacity: 36 troops or 10,000 lb (4.54 t) cargo
- Length: 67 ft 1 in (20.45 m)
- Wingspan: 86 ft 6 in (26.37 m)
- Height: 23 ft 1 in (7.04 m)
- Max takeoff weight: 41,900 lb (19,006 kg)
- Powerplant: 3 × Wright R-1820-99 Cyclone 9-cylinder air-cooled radial piston engine, 1,200 hp (890 kW) each
- Propellers: 3-bladed constant-speed propellers

Performance

- Maximum speed: 207 mph (333 km/h, 180 kn)
- Cruise speed: 171 mph (275 km/h, 149 kn)
- Range: 1,856 mi (2,987 km, 1,613 nmi)
- Service ceiling: 12,200 ft (3,700 m)

== See also ==
Related lists

- List of military aircraft of the United States
