= Caudron C.39 =

French three-engined biplane

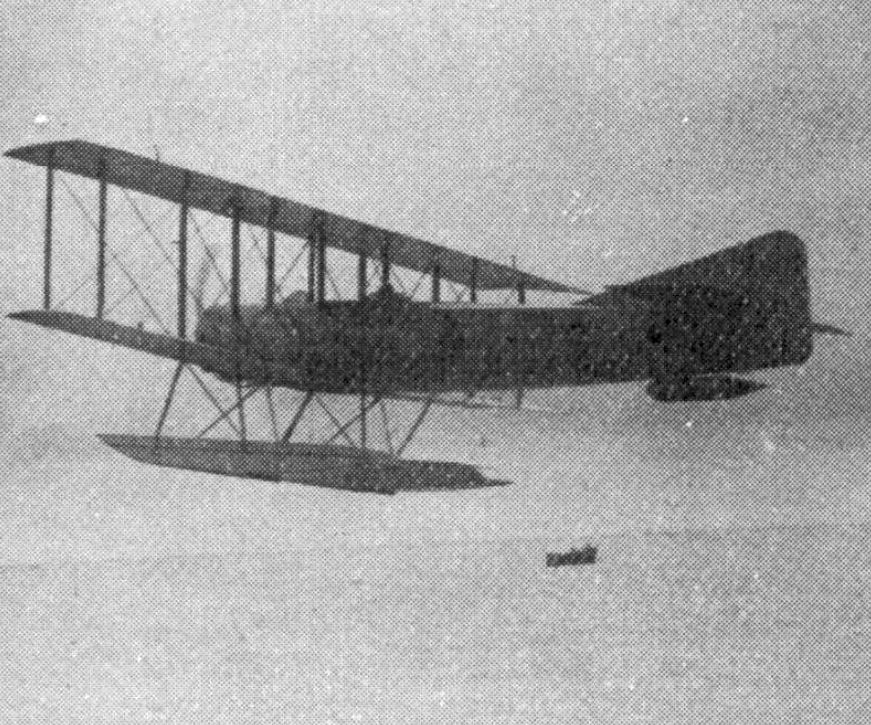

General information
- Type: Airliner
- National origin: France
- Manufacturer: Caudron
- Designer: Phillipe Deville

History
- First flight: 1920
- Variant: Caudron C.43

The Caudron C.39 was a French three-engined biplane with a cabin for six passengers when the aircraft was equipped as a landplane or four passengers when on floats. It was flown with some success in competitions in 1920 and 1921.

== Design and development ==
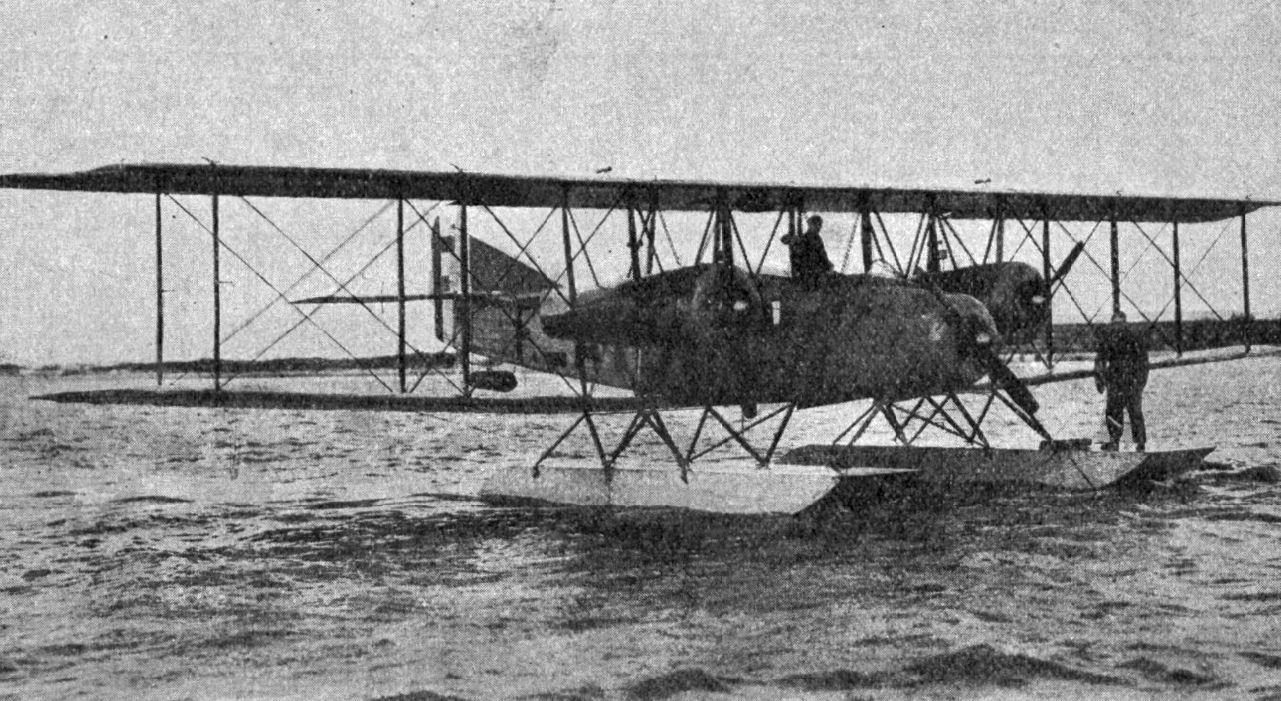
Caudron C.39 photo from L'Aerophile-Salon, 1921

Between 1919 and 1922, Caudron built a series of multi-engined civil passenger transport biplanes of similar design but increasing size and engine power, the C.33, C.37, C.39, C.43 and C.61. The C.39 and C.43 shared the same airframe but had three and five engines respectively.

The C.39 was a three-bay biplane with fabric-covered, rectangular-plan wings mounted without stagger. The lower wing had dihedral outboard of the engines; it had a smaller span than the upper one which carried the ailerons, aerodynamically balanced by overhanging extensions beyond the tips. The wings were joined by vertical pairs of interplane struts, the forward members attached near the leading edges, and the centre section was supported by similar, shorter cabane struts from the upper fuselage. The inner bay was defined by two close pairs of leaning interplane struts, with a 97 kW (130 hp) Clerget 9B nine cylinder rotary engines about halfway between the wings. Each wing-mounted engine was in a long, cylindrical cowling, open at the rear.

The third engine, another cowled Clerget 9, was in the nose; behind it the fuselage had a square section. The pilot and engineer had an open cockpit with its windscreen immediately under the wing leading edge. The passenger cabin, 2.40 m (7 ft 10 in) long, 1.30 m (4 ft 3 in) wide and 1.45 m (4 ft 9 in) high, was lit by six small windows on each side and was accessed through a starboard-side door. Behind the wings the fuselage tapered gently to a broad, triangular fin which carried a vertical-edged unbalanced rudder that reached down to the keel. The fabric-covered tailplane had a straight leading edge with angled tips, and was mounted on top of the fuselage so its elevators had a notch for rudder movement.

In landplane configuration the C.39 had a fixed tailskid undercarriage. There were pairs of main wheels mounted on single axles attached at their centre to a longitudinal bar held under the engine at each end on short, forward-raked V-struts. To prevent nose-overs, there was a fifth wheel mounted under the nose. The wheels could be replaced by flat-bottomed floats, each fixed to the fuselage by two pairs of inverted W-struts, one to each side of the float, assisted by an inverted V-strut from the inside edge to the wing root. Though in floatplane configuration the C.43 sat level over the water, the tailskid was joined by a small, cylindrical float to protect the tail at take-off. In either configuration the undercarriage track was 5.0 m (16 ft 5 in).

== Operational history ==
The date of the first flight, made in landplane configuration, is not known. By the spring of 1920 it was flying with floats, for it competed with the C.33, C.43 and another French aircraft as well as three from Italy in the Grand Prix de Monaco, a seaplane event held between 18 April and 2 May. During the contest Maïcon flew it from Monaco to Ajaccio and back in 8 hrs 10 min, but like the other civil aircraft taking part the C.39 was eliminated.

The C.39 returned to the same competition in April the following year and was much more successful. Flown again by Maïcon, it won first prize over the 492 km (306 mi) Monaco-Ajacco-Monaco circuit in almost the same time as in 1920. it also won over the shorter Monaco-Cannes-San Remo and return course, during which it reached an altitude of 2,000 m (6,560 ft) in 45 minutes carrying 200 kg (440 lb) of ballast. Their attempt in the speed trial was cut short by a fire. With smoke in the cockpit Maïcon lost control and sideslipped into the sea near Saint-Raphaël. No one was hurt and the C.39 was recovered, though seriously damaged.

By June 1921 it was a landplane again and competing in the Grand Prix d'Aéro-Club de France. Pilot Maïcon and flight engineer Courcy were forced to land near Bordeaux with an engine problem. After it was repaired, long grass prevented their take-off and they retired, though only after what L'Aérophile described as a "magnificent debut".

== Variants ==
C.39
Original three-engined aircraft, as described.
C.43
Five 60 kW (80 hp) Le Rhône 9C engines, two in pusher configuration added in extensions of the wing-mounted cowlings.

== Specifications (floatplane) ==
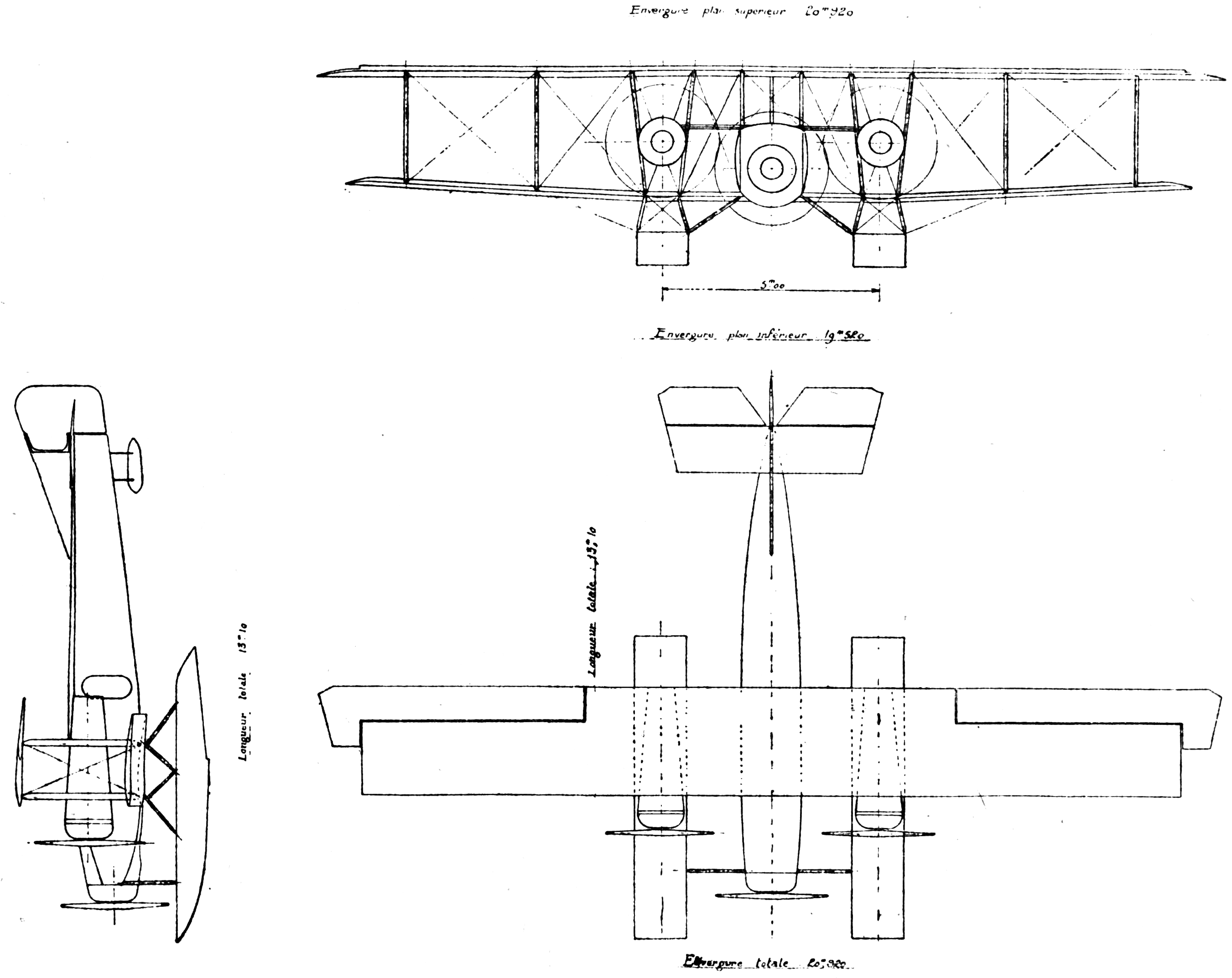
Caudron C.39 3-view drawing from L'Aerophile June,1921

Data from L'Aéophile 29 (Supplement), June 1924, p.XVIII

General characteristics

- Crew: One pilot, one mechanic
- Capacity: Four passengers (landplane six passengers)
- Length: 13.10 m (43 ft 0 in)
- Upper wingspan: 20.92 m (68 ft 8 in)
- Lower wingspan: 19.52 m (64 ft 1 in)
- Height: 4.55 m (14 ft 11 in)
- Wing area: 88.8 m^{2} (956 sq ft)
- Empty weight: 2,170 kg (4,784 lb) 440 kg (970 lb) lighter on wheeled undercarriage
- Gross weight: 3,070 kg (6,768 lb)
- Fuel capacity: 450 kg (992 lb)
- Useful load: 450 kg (992 lb)
- Powerplant: 3 × Clerget 9B 9-cylinder rotary, 97 kW (130 hp) each
- Propellers: 2-bladed, 2.60 m (8 ft 6 in) diameter

Performance

- Maximum speed: 130 km/h (81 mph, 70 kn) . Sources do not state if this was maximum or cruise
- Endurance: 4 hr (6.5 hr as landplane)
