= Caudron C.43 =

First French five-engined aircraft

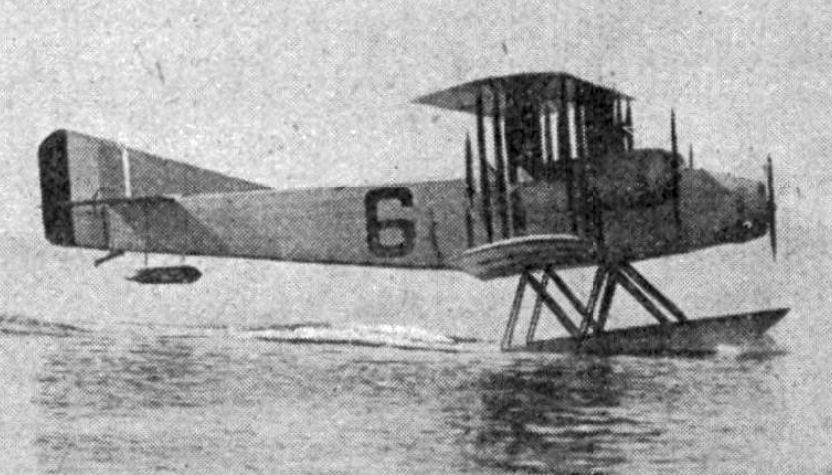

General information
- Type: Five-engined airliner or military aircraft.
- National origin: France
- Manufacturer: Caudron
- Designer: Paul Deville
- Number built: 1

History
- First flight: 1919 or 1920
- Developed from: Caudron C.39

The Caudron C.43 was the first French five-engined aircraft, a biplane intended for passenger transport or military use and multi-engined for safety. A development of the three-engined Caudron C.39, it had one tractor configuration engine in the nose and two push-pull pairs between the wings. It was capable of carrying eight passengers but was not developed.

== Design and development ==
Apart from its engine configuration, the C.43 was conventional and shared its airframe with the three-engined C.39. The first five engine aircraft built in France, it was a three bay biplane with fabric-covered, rectangular-plan wings mounted without stagger. The lower wing had dihedral outboard of the engines, reducing the large inter-wing gap from 2.80 m (9 ft 2 in) inboard to 2.50 m (8 ft 2 in) outboard. Though their spans were about equal (on the C.39, the upper span was 20.92 m (68 ft 8 in) and the lower one 19.52 m (64 ft 1 in)) or 93% of the upper) the area of the lower wing was only 76% that of the upper because of a narrower chord. The wings were joined by vertical pairs of interplane struts, the forward members attached near the leading edges, and the centre section was supported by similar, shorter cabane struts from the upper fuselage. The inner bay was defined by two close pairs of interplane struts, which between them supported the push-pull pairs of 60 kW (80 hp) Le Rhône 9C nine-cylinder rotary engines about halfway between the wings. Each pair was mounted in a long, cylindrical cowling. Its ailerons, on the upper wing only, were aerodynamically balanced by overhanging extensions beyond the tips, as on the C.39.

The fifth engine, another cowled Rhône, 9 was in the nose; behind it the fuselage had a square section with sides of 1.5 m (4 ft 11 in). The pilot and engineer had a very large, open cockpit, with an impressive array of levers controlling the five engines. Behind the wings the fuselage tapered gently to a broad, triangular fin which carried a vertical edged unbalanced rudder that reached down to the keel. As the tailplane was mounted on top of the fuselage, its elevators had a notch for rudder movement.

The C.43 had a fixed tailskid undercarriage. There were pairs of mainwheels mounted on single axles attached to a longitudinal bar held under the engine on short V-struts. To prevent nose-overs, there was a fifth wheel mounted under the nose. The wheels could be replaced by flat sided floats, each fixed to the fuselage by two pairs of inverted V-struts, one to each side of the float. Though in floatplane configuration the C.43 sat level over the water, the tailskid was joined by a small, cylindrical float to protect the tail at take-off.

The main reason for having five engines was safety. In addition, since the C.43, with a total power of 298 kW (400 hp), could lift a useful load of 580 kg (1,279 lb) it could have carried eight passengers or freight or arms. There is no evidence in contemporary sources that passenger accommodation or armament was ever fitted.

The C.43, along with the C.39 and all but one other competitors, was unsuccessful at the Monaco Grand Prix for seaplanes, held in the spring of 1920.

The sole example was purchased by the Section Technique de l'Aéronautique (S.T.Aé.) to investigate the instrumentation and control requirements of multi-engined aircraft.

== Specifications ==
Data from L'Année des Aéronautique (1920–1)

General characteristics

- Crew: Two
- Length: 12.55 m (41 ft 2 in)
- Wingspan: 20.92 m (68 ft 8 in)
- Height: 5.10 m (16 ft 9 in)
- Wing area: 88.8 m^{2} (956 sq ft)
- Empty weight: 1,900 kg (4,189 lb)
- Gross weight: 3,240 kg (7,143 lb)
- Fuel capacity: 600 kg (1,323 lb), including oil
- Powerplant: 5 × Le Rhône 9C 9-cylinder rotary, 60 kW (80 hp) each
- Propellers: 2-bladed

Performance

- Maximum speed: 140 km/h (87 mph, 76 kn) at 00 m (0 ft)
- Cruise speed: 120 km/h (75 mph, 65 kn)
- Time to altitude: 42 min to 3,000 m (9,843 ft)
