= Caudron C.61 =

C.61
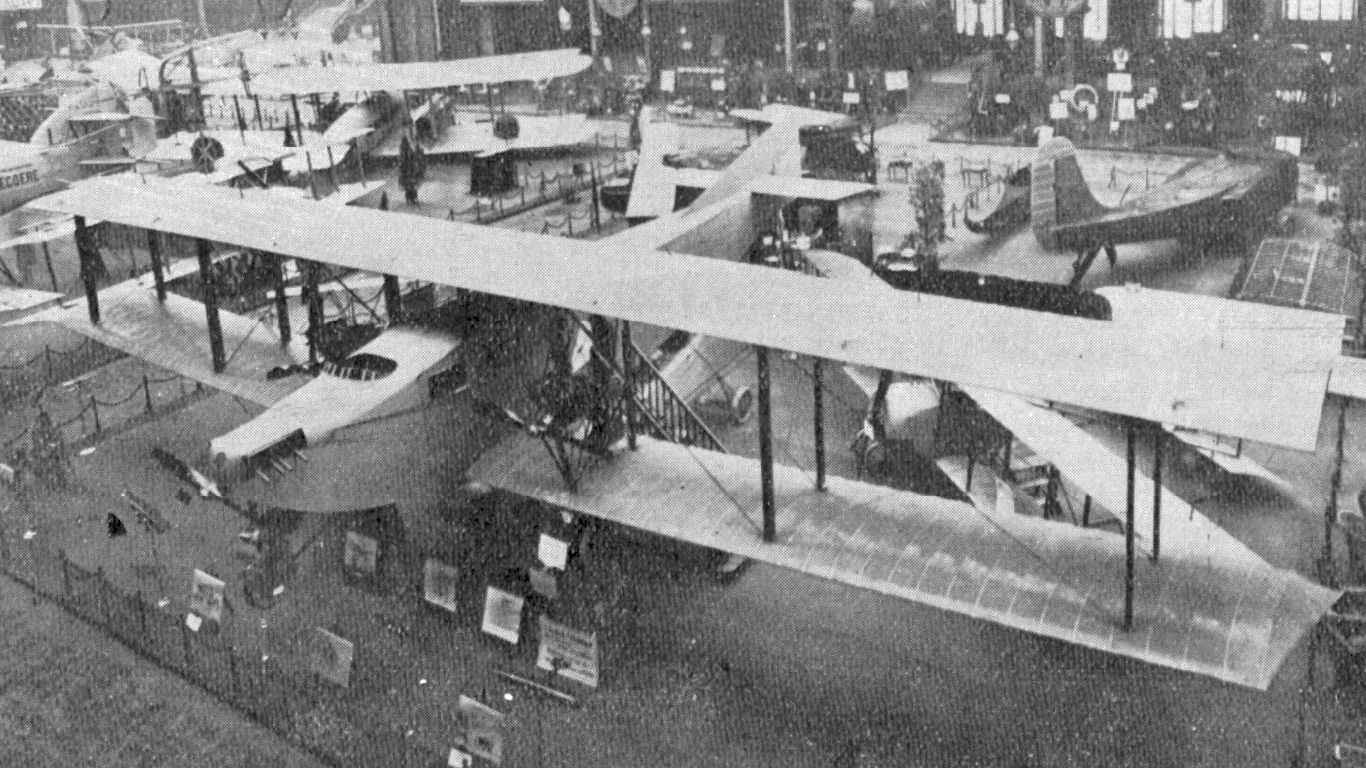

General information
- Type: transport
- Manufacturer: Caudron
- Status: Retired

History
- First flight: 1921

The Caudron C.61 was a French three-engined civil transport biplane aircraft built by the French aeroplane manufacturer Caudron. It was constructed of wood and covered in fabric.

== Development ==
The prototype C.61 (F-ESAE) had a freight hold and cabin for six passengers. The conventional landing gear also included a wheel beneath the nose to prevent nose-overs on landing. For the production C.61s the cabin size was increased to accommodate eight passengers.

== Operational history ==
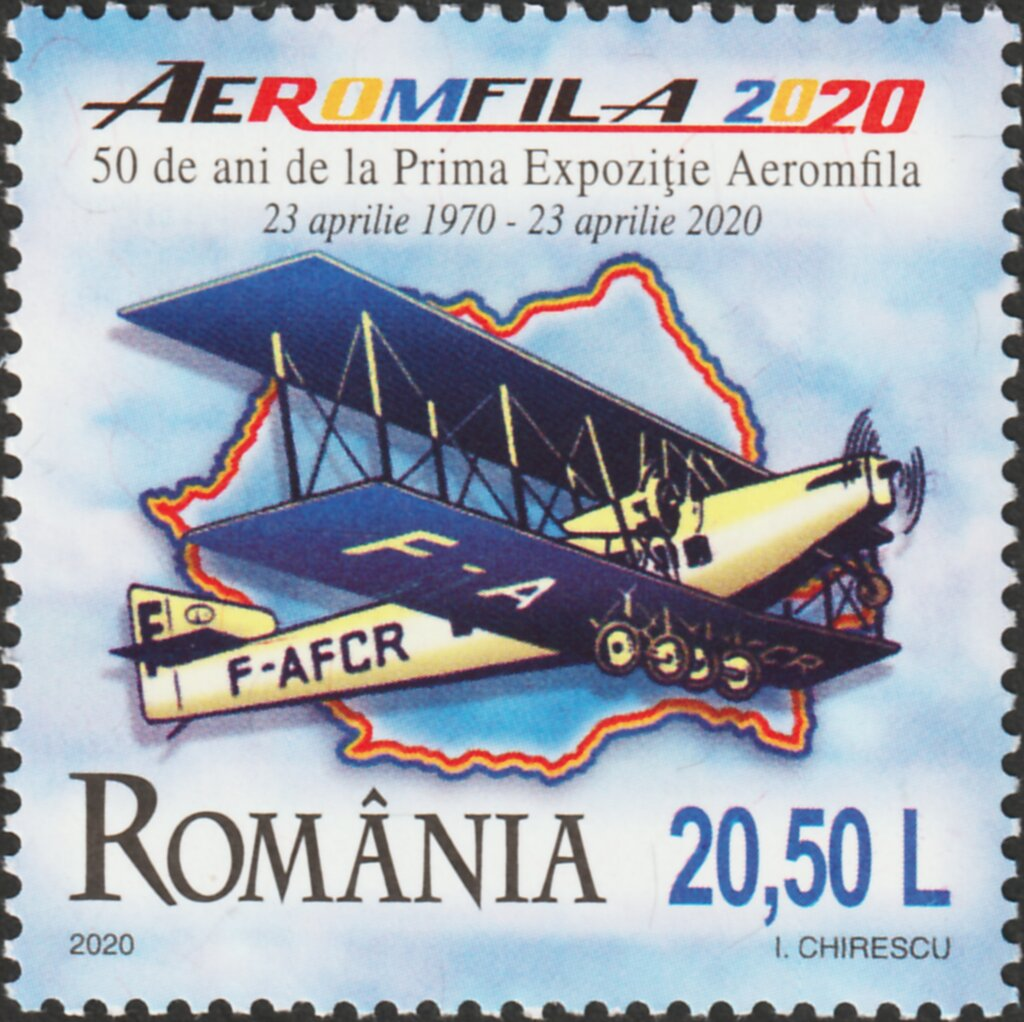
C.61 of CFRNA featured on a Romanian stamp

In 1923, six C.61s were bought by Compagnie Franco-Roumaine de Navigation Aérienne (CFRNA) to run between Bucharest and Belgrade.

== Variants ==
C.61
Initial production variant.
C.61bis
In 1924 many C.61s were modified to take 194 kW (260 hp) Salmson CM.9 radial engines outboard, increasing the maximum loaded weight to 4,834 kg (10,657 lb).
C.81
1923 trimotor airliner
C.83
1924 Unbuilt trimotor project
C.183
1923 trimotor airliner

== Operators ==
- Compagnie Franco-Roumaine de Navigation Aérienne/Compagnie Internationale de Navigation Aérienne

== Specifications (C.61) ==
Data from European Transport Aircraft since 1910

General characteristics

- Crew: 2
- Capacity: 8 passengers
- Length: 14.00 m (45 ft 11 in)
- Upper wingspan: 24.14 m (79 ft 2 in)
- Lower wingspan: 20.40 m (66 ft 11 in)
- Wing area: 104 m^{2} (1,120 sq ft)
- Empty weight: 2,100–2,200 kg (4,630–4,850 lb)
- Gross weight: 3,480 kg (7,672 lb)
- Powerplant: 3 × Hispano-Suiza 8Ac water-cooled V-8 engines, 130 kW (180 hp) each
- Propellers: 2-bladed wooden fixed pitch propellers

Performance

- Maximum speed: 160 km/h (99 mph, 86 kn)
- Range: 640 km (400 mi, 350 nmi)
- Service ceiling: 4,000 m (13,000 ft)
- Take-off run: 166 m (545 ft)
- Landing run: 220 m (722 ft)

== Accidents ==
- after 1923 (date unknown) - C.61 was lost when it came down at sea
- July 3, 1926 - C.61 operated by Compagnie Internationale de Navigation Aérienne crashes in Czechoslovakia
