= Émile Régnier =

French flying ace (1894–1940)

Émile Julien Mathurin Régnier
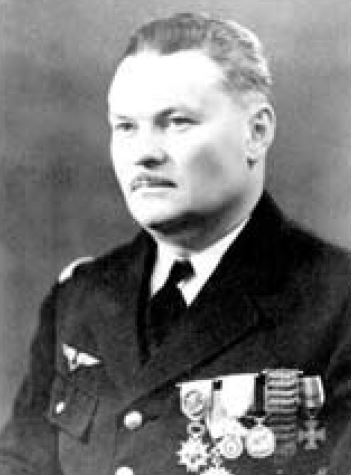
- Born: 29 July 1894; Plémy, France
- Died: 4 September 1940 (aged 46); Pozzi, Italy
- Military career
- Allegiance: France
- Branch: Aviation
- Rank: Sous lieutenant
- Unit: Escadrille 89
- Awards: Légion d'honneur Médaille militaire Croix de Guerre
- Other work: Aircraft engine designer and manufacturer

Sous lieutenant Émile Julien Mathurin Régnier (29 July 1894 – 4 September 1940) was a World War I flying ace credited with six aerial victories. He served in the French infantry from September 1914 until early June 1917, suffering two serious wounds in the process. On 28 June 1917, he transferred into aviation as a corporal. He joined Escadrille 89 as a fighter pilot on 8 January 1918. He would serve through war's end, sharing in six confirmed victories scored in conjunction with other pilots.

Postwar, he would be granted the Légion d'honneur to add to his Médaille militaire and Croix de Guerre.

He became successively an agent for De Havilland beginning in 1932, then an air racing participant, and finally an aircraft engine designer and builder beginning in 1934. He died at Pozzi, Valeggio sul Mincio, Italy, aged 46. Régnier's death did not close down his aircraft engine company, which subsequently was captured and used by the Nazis during World War II.

== Early life and infantry service ==
Émile Julien Mathurin Régnier was born on 29 July 1894 in Plémy, France. In the early days of World War I, on 1 September 1914, he joined the 115th Infantry Regiment of the French Army. On 26 February 1915, he was promoted to caporal. Shortly thereafter, on 16 March, he was wounded seriously enough to be evacuated to hospital. He would not be fit for duty until the end of the year; on 12 December, he was posted to the 112th Infantry Regiment. He was severely wounded once again, on 22 July 1916, not returning to duty until 14 November.

== Aviation service ==
On 28 June 1917, Émile Régnier began aviation training. After a normal progression of training, he was awarded Military Pilot's Brevet 8557 on 12 September.

After advanced training, on 8 January 1918, he joined SPAD Escadrille 89 as a fighter pilot. On 12 April, he was promoted to sergent. He scored his first aerial victory on 17 June. He became an adjutant on 1 August. By 27 September, he had shared in six confirmed victories; he also had three unconfirmed claims. On 13 October 1918, he was awarded the Médaille militaire for his valor. By war's end, he also had the Croix de Guerre to his credit, with six palmes and an étoile de vermeile, and was a Sous lieutenant.

By war's end, Régnier had flown 615 combat hours, fought in 26 dogfights, and carried out 82 special missions.

Régnier received a belated appointment as a Chevalier of the Légion d'honneur on 11 July 1920.

== Engine manufacturing ==
There is a gap in the record of Regnier's life in the post-World War I period, though it seems likely he stayed in aviation. At the 1932 Paris Air Show, Régnier was the French agent for de Havilland, displaying a Gipsy III and a Gipsy Major. By mid-1933, Régnier was edging into air racing; he supplied a Gipsy Major engine to power a Potez 43 in the Angers 12 hours air trial. By 1934, he had gone into business for himself as Régnier Motor Company. Régnier designed an inverted air-cooled six-cylinder engine for use in a privately entered Caudron C.366 to compete in the Coupe Deutsch de Meurthe air race in 1934. The 217 brake horsepower motor was supposedly developed from a de Havilland inverted four-cylinder engine.

On 6 January 1934, one of his engines, mounted in a Caudron C.362, set a new 1,000-kilometer speed record of 332.8 km/h for light aircraft; this was six days too late to claim a 50,000-franc prize from the French air ministry. On 27 May 1934, it took second place in the 2,000 km Coupe Deutsch de Meurthe at virtually the same speed. The Régnier engine powered a Percival Mew Gull to victory in the Coupe Armand Esders in July 1935 at 302 km/h. By 1936, the Régnier R-6 engine was being supercharged by a Rootes blower; six different engine types were shown at the Paris Air Show. A supercharged inverted air-cooled V-12 Régnier debuted in early 1937, developing 450 hp. During World War II, the Régnier Motor Company fell into the hands of the invading Nazis, and became a supplier of the German military.

== Death ==
On 4 September 1940, Régnier died in a clinic in Pozzi.
