= Marcel Riffard =

French aeronautical engineer

- Born: 30 November 1886; Villa Ocampo, Santa Fe Province, Argentina
- Died: 9 July 1981 (aged 94); Versailles, France
- Occupations: Aeronautical engineer, designer

Marie André Marcel Riffard (30 November 1886 – 9 July 1981) was a French aeronautical engineer. He designed fighter aircraft and air racers, as well as airplanes for postal delivery and medical transport. He also designed racing cars and land-speed record cars for Panhard and Renault. Riffard has been called the "Father of modern aviation".

== Early years ==
On 14 July 1883, French engineer Edmond Riffard arrived in Argentina with his wife Gabrielle Guy de Riffard and their son Pablo. The family settled in Villa Ocampo, Santa Fe Province. Edmond had moved to Argentina to build the Tacuarendí sugar mill, and while there also introduced both the telephone and paper money to the country, and established the French Chaco Distillery in partnership with compatriot George Brosset. While in Argentina the Riffards had two more children; Irma, in 1885, and Marcel, on 30 November 1886. One year after the Baring crisis of 1890, the family returned to France, arriving on 14 July 1893. Eventually there were five children in the family.

Marcel Riffard attended school at the Lycée J.B. Dumas in Alès. During the mathematics portion of the 1903 Concours général, he provided seven solutions to a problem for which Henri Poincaré had only given five. For this he won the Grande Médaille d'Argent, the Prix de la Société Scientifique et Littéraire, and the Premier Prix au Concours Généraux, Section Mathématiques. He also pursued athletics, going to Paris in July 1905 for the Critérium Interscolaire d'Athlétisme, where he finished third.

Riffard studied in preparation for admission to l'École nationale supérieure des mines de Saint-Étienne at the Lycée Carnot in the city of Saint-Étienne but did not pursue a Grande école. Instead he worked for tire manufacturer La Société des Pneumatiques Samson from October 1905 to October 1907. From 10 October 1907 until 28 September 1909 Riffard performed his national military service with the 38th field artillery regiment, assigned to the 7th battery detachment in Bastia, Corsica.

== Aircraft ==
=== Early work ===
In 1907, at the age of 21, Riffard built a powered scale model monoplane that was able to reach a speed of 66 km/h (41 mph).

Riffard designed the structure for a biplane commissioned by Auguste Witzig and built by Fernand Lioré. The craft was shown without an engine in September 1908, and was flown by Guillaume Busson in the Bétheny competition in August 1909.

In 1909, Riffard developed a scale model of an electrically controlled variable-pitch propeller.

On 1 January 1910, Riffard conceived of and designed the first aircraft built entirely of metal. This pusher monoplane used pressed steel for the structure and aluminum for the skin. It was built in collaboration with aviators Georges Legagneux and Robert Martinet. It may have only been ground tested.

In 1912 Riffard designed the first medical aircraft, built with the help of Legagneux and Martinet. He also invented an anti-icing device and a thermoregulator flap for water-cooled engines.

On 2 August 1914, Riffard was recalled to active military duty with the 38th artillery regiment, and in 1916 was transferred to the Groupe Aviation du Bourget.

=== Louis Bréguet Aviation ===
In 1917 Riffard moved to Bréguet Aviation, established by Louis Charles Bréguet at Villacoublay. Riffard was head of the Bréguet Design Office at Vélizy until 1923. One of his first projects was to adapt an early turbocharger from the company founded by Auguste Rateau to the Bréguet 14.

==== RM-1 ====
At Bréguet in 1917, Riffard and Gabriel Mollard worked on a design for a rocket-powered military biplane called the RM-1. Its chief armament was a single rocket-propelled missile.

==== Leviathan ====
Riffard designed the quad-engined Leviathan XXII, and developed the engage/disengage mechanism that allowed one engine in each of the dual-engine Bréguet-Bugatti assemblies to be shut down while the other continued to drive the shared propeller.

=== Louis de Monge ===
From 1923 to 1926, Riffard was the technical director for the company run by Belgian engineer Louis de Monge at Issy-les-Moulineaux. He designed two fighter aircraft while with de Monge, but the company failed before they could be produced. He also designed a tri-engined transatlantic flying wing passenger transport that progressed to the flying model stage.

=== Lioré et Olivier ===
In 1926, Riffard became head of the Clichy design office of Société de Constructions Aéronautiques d'Hydravions Lioré et Olivier, a flying boat builder based in Levallois-Perret. He remained there until 1930.

While there he contributed to the design of several aircraft, including the LeO.122, LeO.20, LeO H-18, LeO H-180, LeO H-24, and the LeO H-242.

=== Marcel Bloch ===
From 1930 to 1931, Riffard was the general manager of Société des Avions Marcel Bloch.

While with Marcel Bloch, he completed a design that had been started by Bloch's previous designer Pineau, resulting in the Bloch MB.60.

=== Omnium Métallurgique Industriel ===
From 1931 to 1932, Riffard worked at Omnium Métallurgique Industriel (OMI), an engine builder whose products for motorcycles and aircraft were sold under the Chaise name. At OMI, Riffard was tasked with testing their first 95 hp (71 kW) inverted cylinder aircraft engine. It was also during his time at OMI that Riffard designed an aircraft called the MR-300 intended specifically to compete in the Coupe Deutsch de la Meurthe. The aircraft's side profile was wing-shaped, and may have acted as a lifting body. While one reference says that it was powered by an 8 L (488 cu in) flat-sixteen engine, others say that it was a Chaise flat-8 designated 8C, producing 300 hp (224 kW).

Also at OMI at this time was Russian aeronautical engineer Georges Otfinovsky, with whom Riffard would work on several designs later at Caudron.

=== Caudron ===
Riffard became Technical Director and Chief Engineer of l'Association Aéroplanes Caudron Frères, at 52 rue Guynemer in Issy-les-Moulineaux on 1 March 1932." Otfinovsky moved to Caudron at or near the same time.

In 1933, Pierre Cot, the Ministre de l'Air of France, asked Renault to assume control of Caudron. When Renault acquired control of Caudron, Riffard was part of the deal. La Société Anonyme des Avion Caudron, commonly called Caudron-Renault, was established on 30 June 1933.

Riffard's sojourn at Caudron was a productive time for him, resulting in 73 prototypes.

Several of the aircraft designed by Riffard for Caudron featured a wing design called the "aile crocodile" ("crocodile wing"), which had intrados flaps with split trailing edges.

Riffard's aircraft designs for Caudron include the following:

==== Simoun ====
Riffard designed the Simoun, a series of four-place monoplanes that were popular as private tourers, mail service carriers, and military liaison aircraft. The name is French for the "Simoom" wind that blows across the Eastern Mediterranean and Arabic Peninsula. The first flight of a Simoun took place in 1934.

The Air Bleu service began on 10 July 1935 from Le Bourget, using Caudron Simouns to transfer mail across France.

In December 1935 Antoine de Saint-Exupéry and André Prévot piloted the Simoun C.630 with registry F-ANRY in the Paris-to-Saïgon air race. The pair crashed in the Sahara desert, and were eventually rescued by Bedouin tribesmen. Saint-Exupéry later wrote about the experience in his 1939 book "Wind, Sand and Stars", and used it as the inspiration for his novella, "The Little Prince". In 1936 Saint-Exupéry acquired the Caudron Simoun C.635 registered F-ANXK. He crashed this plane in Guatemala, and remained in a coma for eight days.

On 30 December 1936, at 7:23am, French pilot Maryse Bastié took off from Dakar in a modified Caudron Simoun C.635, registered F-ANXO, that she had christened "Jean Mermoz" for the deceased aviator. When she landed in Natal, Brazil twelve hours and five minutes later, she set a new record for fastest crossing of the Atlantic ocean at an average speed of 264 km/h (164 mph). On 19 December 1937, pilot Maryse Hilsz took off from Istres in a Simoun C.635 registered F-AQDY with the goal of setting a new distance record. To reduce fuel consumption, the original 6Q engine was replaced by a less powerful engine from the C.620. Forced to land in Alexandria, she still beat a previous record set by André Japy in a Caudron Aiglon. From December 29 to 30, 1938, Hilsz set a new distance record for Class C aircraft by flying from Istres to Port-Etienne, Mauritania.

==== Goéland ====
The Riffard-designed Caudron Goéland ("Gull") was a trainer/transport aircraft that debuted in 1934. Powered by twin Renault engines, it was able to carry pilot, copilot, and six passengers at speeds of up to 186 mph (299 km/h). Goélands were operated by several companies, as well as both the French Armee de l'Air and the German Luftwaffe during the occupation. More than 1700 examples were built.

==== Aiglon ====
The C.600 Aiglon ("Eaglet") was a tandem cockpit light touring monoplane. It had its first flight in March 1935. Popular with private owners and flying clubs, several Aiglons were requisitioned by the French government during WWI, with some serving as liaison aircraft.

==== Typhon ====
The Caudron C.640 Typhon was a general use monoplane designed primarily as a long-distance postal carrier. It first flew in 1935.

==== C.710 series ====
This was a series of fighter aircraft designed by Riffard that included the C.714 Cyclone. The prototype, model C.710, first flew on 18 July 1936.

==== Air racers ====
Some of the most famous aircraft designed by Riffard at Caudron were the air racers. Some series included both racing and fighter models. Among the racers, three different series of tandem two-seat Grand Sport aircraft were named Rafale, which means "gust" in French.

Caudron racing aircraft made several appearances in the Coupe Deutsch de la Meurthe air race, and came to dominate the third series of these competitions that began in 1933.

During the pre-race trials for the 1933 Coupe Deutsch de la Meurthe, pilot Ludovic Arrachart was killed when his Caudron C.360 crashed at Maisons near Chartres. Raymond Delmotte's Caudron C.362 took second place in the race with a speed of 291.12 km/h (180.9 mph). In the 1934 Coupe, Caudrons finished 1-2-3, with Maurice Arnoux first in a Caudron C.450 at 388.97 km/h (241.69 mph), Louis Masotte second in a Caudron C.366 Atalante at 360.72 km/h (224.14 mph), and Albert Monville third in a Caudron C.460 at 341.04 km/h (211.91 mph). In the 1935 race, Riffard-designed planes finished first and second, with Yves Lacombe first in a Caudron C.450 with a speed of 389.47 km/h (242.01 mph), ahead of Maurice Arnoux second in a Caudron C.461 in with a speed of 369.59 km/h (229.65 mph). In the fourth Coupe Deutsch de la Meurthe held in 1936, the only planes entered were Caudrons. Five were entered, but only three competed.

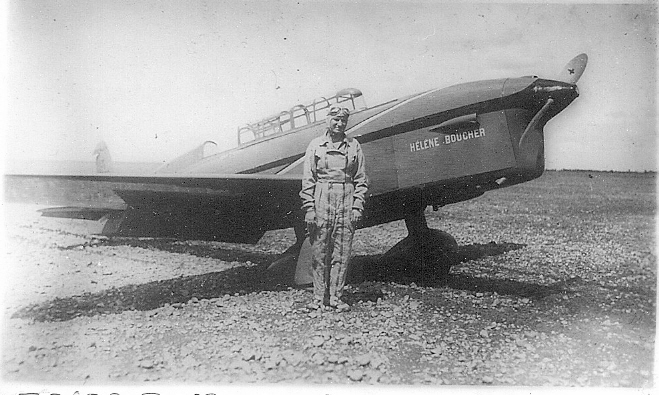
Hélène Boucher with her Caudron Rafale

After staging an air race between French aviators Hilsz and Hélène Boucher on 12 June 1934, Caudron signed Boucher on as their factory pilot. Already the holder of a Fédération Aéronautique Internationale (FAI) altitude record, Boucher went on to fly a variety of Riffard-designed Caudron aircraft, including the C.430, C.450 and C.530. On 8 July 1934, Boucher and her passenger Marie-Louise Becker placed second in the Douze Heures d'Angers in a Caudron C.530 registered F-ANAO, behind the team of Lacombe and Trivier, also in a Caudron. During this race Boucher broke the women's and men's speed record over 1,000 km in a light aircraft with a speed of 250.086 km/h (155.396 mph). On 8 August 1934 Boucher set a new speed record for a distance of 100 km with a speed of 412.371 km/h (256.235 mph), and raised her previous record for 1000 km by posting a speed of 409.184 km/h (254.255 mph). On 11 August 1934, she set a new world record for speeds over a 3 km course, at 445.028 km/h (276.528 mph). By mid-August 1934, she held seven international records. Boucher died on 30 November 1934 after her C.430, registered F-AMVB, crashed at La Croix du Bois near Guyancourt.

Pilot Michel Détroyat shocked the American air racing establishment in 1936 by easily winning both the Greve Trophy and the Thompson Trophy, in a Caudron C.460 Rafale. The Rafale faced American aircraft with engines having more than double the displacement and power of the French plane.

==== Other Caudron designs ====
Riffard also designed the 1936 Caudron C.690 flight trainer and 1938 Caudron C.860 long range military communications aircraft.

=== Bureau Secret Clandestin in Boulogne-Billancourt and Société Rateau ===
From 1 August 1940 to 31 May 1944, during the German occupation of France, Riffard worked with both the Bureau Secret Clandestin at Boulogne-Billancourt and the Société Rateau in La Courneuve.

It was this period that Riffard, working with Otfinosvsky, created designs for two jet aircraft; one with a single engine, the other a twin-engine fighter jet. Engines were expected to be supplied by Rateau.

In 1942 he conceived of an aircraft capable of carrying up to forty passengers across the Atlantic at speeds of 700 km/h (435 mph), and of a Vertical Take-Off and Landing (VTOL) craft powered by two engines that rotated between vertical and horizontal positions.

=== Société Nationale Aéronautique du Centre ===
From 1944 to 1949, Riffard continued to serve as a consulting engineer for the Société Rateau, as well as for the Société Nationale Aéronautique du Centre (SNAC).

He was a consulting engineer on the first French jet aircraft ever built, the SO.6000 Triton. In the spring of 1943, Lucien Servanty at SNAC resumed Riffard and Otfinovsky's earlier work on jet aircraft, while René Anxionnaz at Rateau developed the SRA-1 jet engine.

The SO.6000 had its maiden flight on 11 November 1946, becoming the first French designed and built jet to fly. Five were built.

=== Sud Aviation ===
In the early 1960s, Riffard became a technical adviser to the Société nationale des constructions aéronautiques du sud-ouest, commonly known as Sud Aviation.

Riffard was involved in the company's efforts to address deficiencies in the recently developed SNCASE SE.3200 Frelon ("Hornet") helicopter, which had not progressed past a few prototypes due to poor performance. He revised the shape of the body and glass of the craft, and had all minor raised surfaces smoothed. The result was the Sud Aviation SA 321 Super Frelon. The Super Frelon's maiden flight was on 7 December 1962. On 23 July 1963, it set a new speed record for rotorcraft at a speed of 350.47 km/h (217.77 mph).

In 1970, the merger of Sud-Aviation, the Société nationale de constructions aéronautiques Nord-Aviation, and the Société d'étude et de réalisation d'engins balistiques resulted in a new entity, the Société Nationale Industrielle Aérospatiale (SNIAS), or simply Aérospatiale.

== Bicycles ==
Riffard was involved in the design of at least two aerodynamic bicycle projects.

=== Vélo-Torpille ===
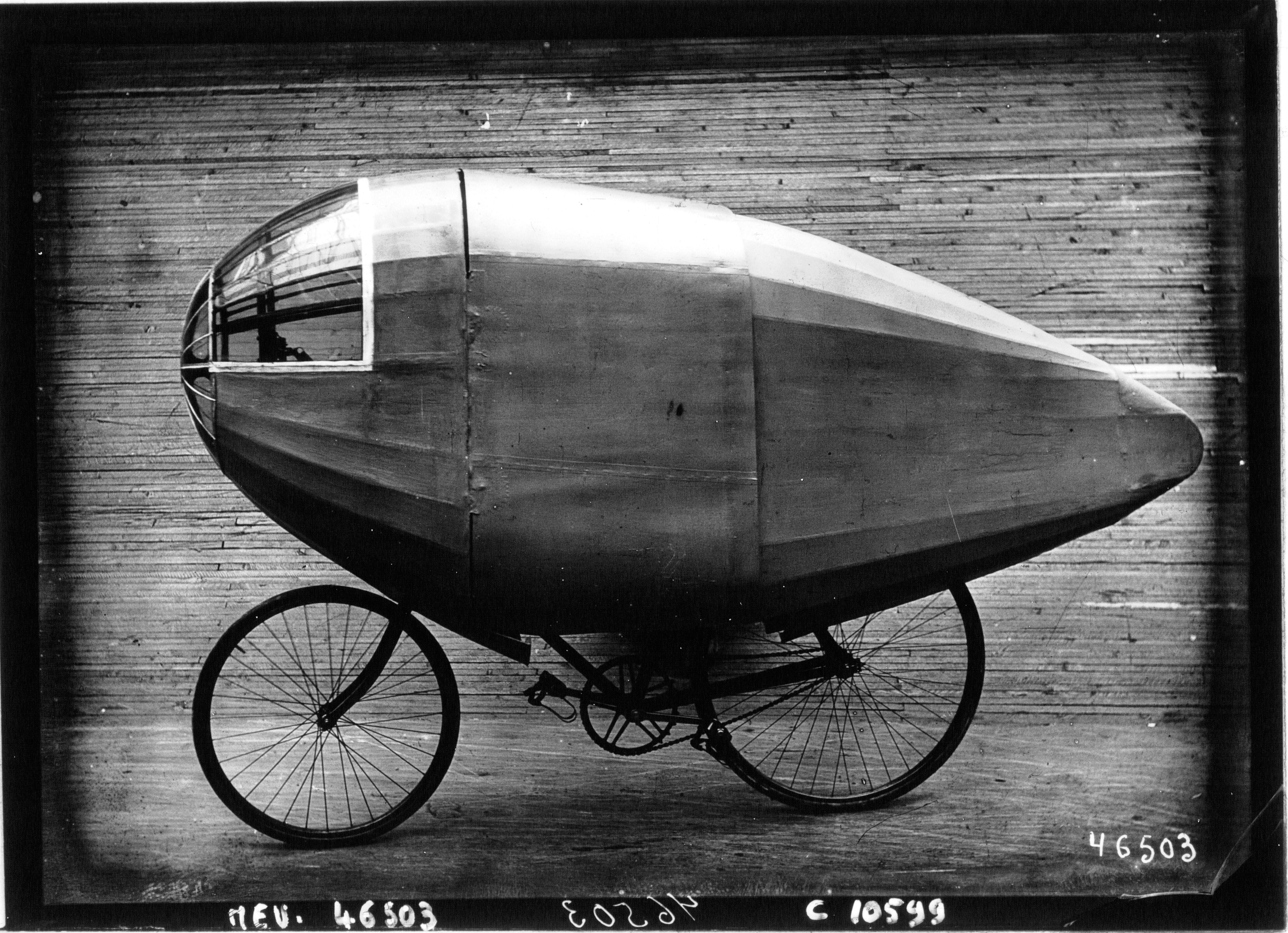
The Vélo-Torpille

Étienne Bunau-Varilla was the son of a French engineer who had made his fortune working on the abortive French Panama Canal project. After completing his Baccalauréat, the younger Bunau-Varilla was given an airplane as a gift, and participated in some air races. He later started racing bicycles, and was the originator of the Vélo-Torpille (Torpedo bike). Work on the project started in 1910.

Riffard designed a narrow, tapering dirigible-shaped fairing made of wood and celluloid that covered the rider's entire body except for his lower legs. The completed assembly weighed 17 kg (37.5 lb)

The shape of the bike and fairing earned it the nickname "l'Oeuf de Berthet" — Berthet's egg. Marcel Berthet was a cyclist who had set several world kilometre records, and who rode the bike during its record attempts.

In 1913 Berthet covered one kilometre in 1 minute 04 seconds in the Vélo-Torpille at the Parc des Princes stadium. Later, at the Vélodrome d'Hiver, he reduced his time to 1 minute 02 seconds, setting a new Union Cycliste Internationale (UCI) record. The UCI refused to recognize the feat because of Riffard's fairing.

=== Vélodyne ===
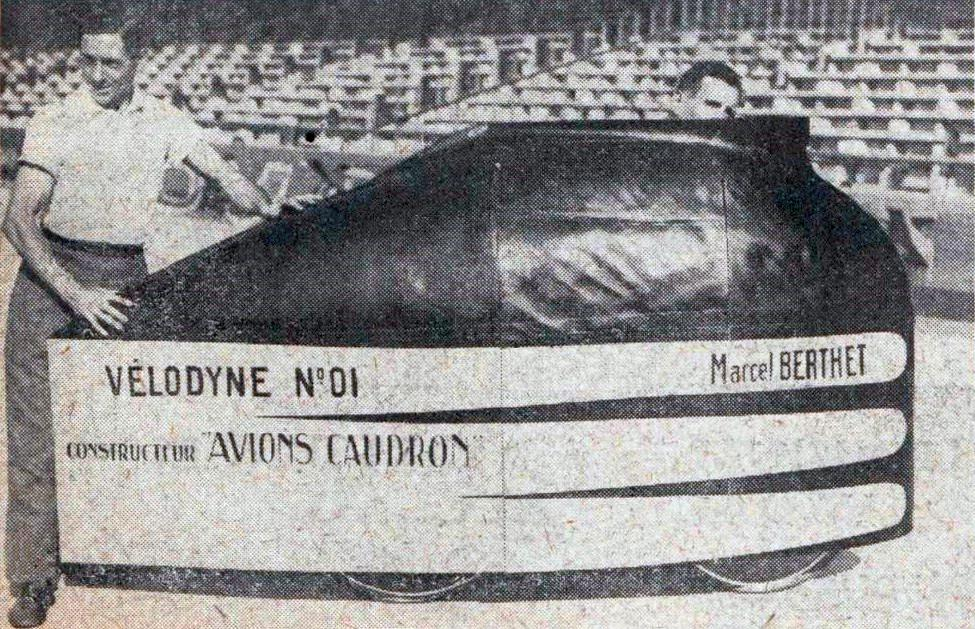
Berthet in the Vélodyne, 1933

Working just with Berthet, Riffard helped design another fairing-covered bicycle called the Vélodyne.

This cycle had a reversed front fork, and front wheel smaller than the rear. The frame was made of aluminum, while the fairing was of spruce and magnolia wood covered in canvas. Total weight was 15 kg (33.1 lb). The fairing, which extended almost to the ground, opened on the side to admit the rider. It was built by the Caudron Aircraft Company.

On 9 September 1933, Berthet covered 48.6 km (30.199 mi) in one hour at the Parc des Princes, beating the standing record. Two months later Berthet took the Vélodyne out on the l'Autodrome de Linas-Montlhéry and increased his distance to 49.992 km (31.064 mi) for the hour. Neither of these forays were recognized by the UCI.

== Automobiles ==
Riffard designed aerodynamic bodywork for several automobiles, including at least one production sports car, several endurance racers, and some land speed record attempt cars.

=== Renault Rafale ===
Riffard contributed to the design of a concept car called the Renault Rafale. Unveiled in 1934, this car was the precursor to the Renault Vivastella Grand Sport launched the same year.

=== Renault Viva Grand Sport ===
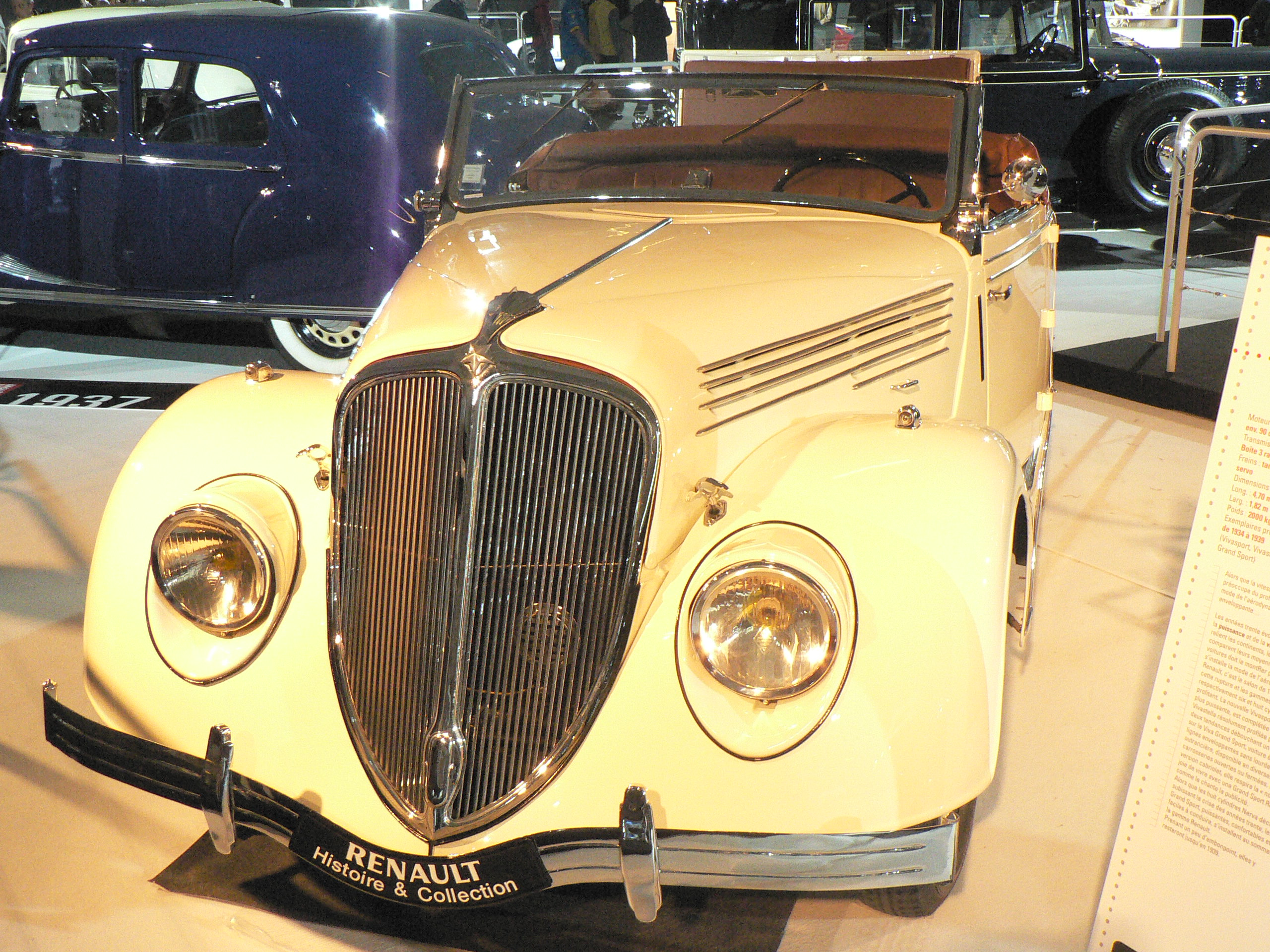
Renault Viva Grand Sport

In 1934 Renault debuted their Vivastella Grand Sport, with a body designed by Riffard. The car was renamed the Renault Viva Grand Sport the next year. Riffard applied his experience designing aircraft to the car's body shape. The car debuted at the 1934 Salon de Paris, alongside the Nervastella, and was built by Renault between 1934 and 1939. At 1,720 mm (67.7 in), the car is wide enough to seat three people abreast. It is powered by an inline six-cylinder engine displacing 4.1 L (250 cu in), mounted lengthwise at the front.

Renault hired celebrity aviator and Caudron-Renault factory pilot Hélène Boucher to promote the Viva Grand Sport.

=== Nervasport des Records ===
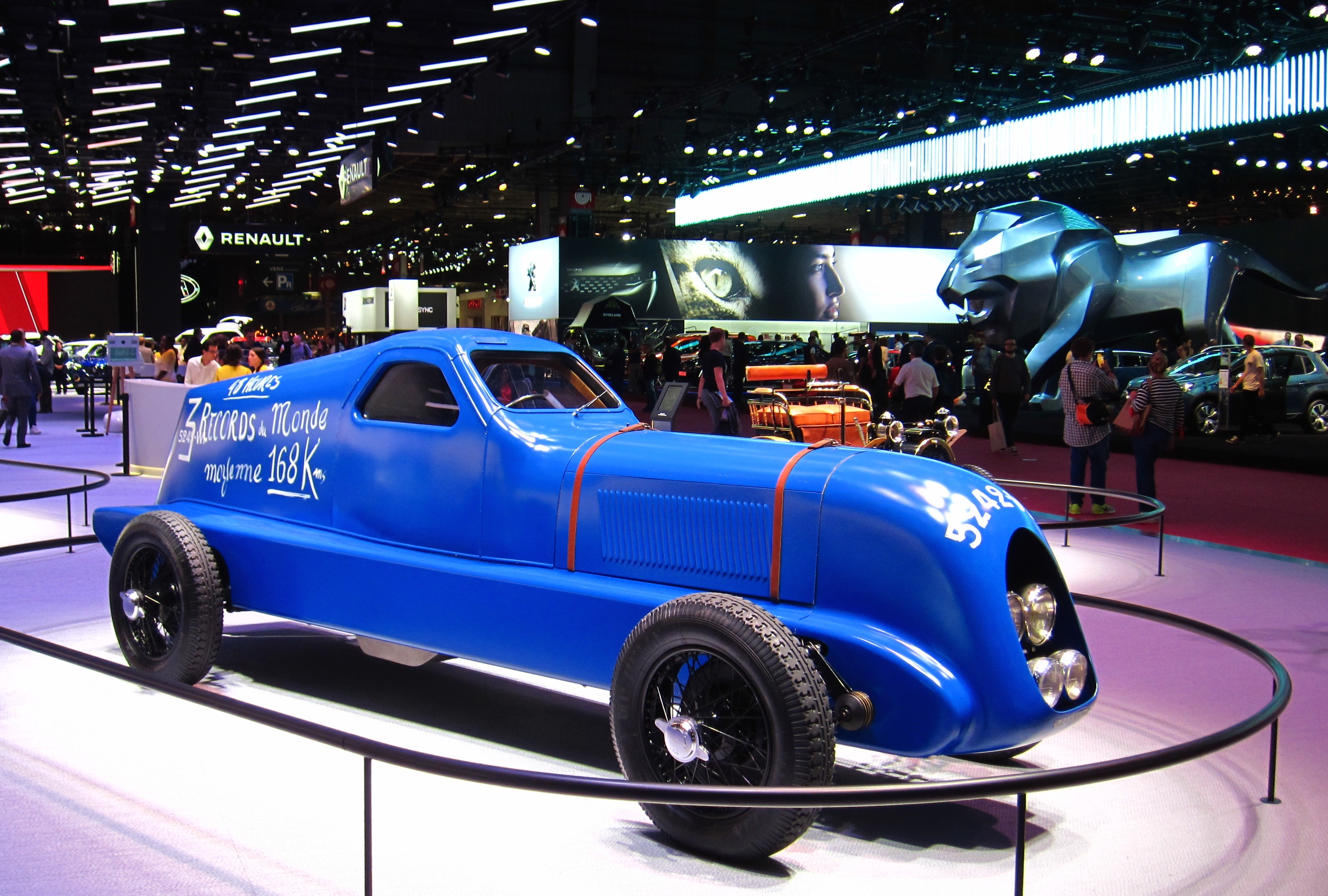
Nervasport des Records reproduction

About six years after setting land speed records with its streamlined Type NM 40CV single-seater, Renault decided to pursue new land speed records with a tuned Nervastella at Monthléry in March 1932.

For the next attempt Renault commissioned l'atelier 153, a dedicated workshop within Renault under the direction of Auguste Riolfo that handled testing new models and special projects, to build a dedicated land speed racer.

The car was based on a standard Nervasport chassis, but with a custom body designed by Riffard and made of hand-hammered metal supported by a wooden framework. The single seater had an enclosed cockpit with a flat windscreen. The roofline angled slightly downwards behind the driver, and narrowed into a fin-like shape. Length and width were 5.2 m × 1.87 m (205 in × 74 in), and the car weighed 1,600 kg (3,527 lb).

The record car used the 4.8 L (293 cu in) flathead straight-8 engine from the production Nervasport, which produced 108 hp (80.5 kW), mated to a 3-speed manual transmission.

The drivers selected for the run were Roger Quatresous, Léo Fromentin, André Wagner, and Georges Berthelon, who also served as garage manager. Each driver rotated in three-hour shifts.

The record attempt started at Monthléry on 3 April 1934 at 3:37 pm, and continued until just before 4:00 pm, 5 April 1934. The attempt set three world records and nine international records for cars with engines displacing 3.0–5.0 L (183–305 cu in), including the 48-hour speed record, with an average speed of 167.445 km/h (104.045 mph). New average speed records were also set for 4,000 and 5,000 mi (6,437 and 8,047 km) distances.

On the eightieth anniversary of the Nervasport's record-breaking run, and in advance of their 110th anniversary of motorsports activity, Renault commissioned a replica of the 1934 Nervasport des Records be built. The first sketches of the car were done in 2014, and the completed replica debuted on the Montlhérey circuit in June 2016.

=== Vivasport des Records ===
The records set by the Nervasport des Records did not stand long. On 8 May 1934, at 4:00 pm, a streamlined single-seat Delahaye appeared at Monthléry and raised the record average speed to just over 193 km/h (120 mph), and set a new record for the 10,000 km (6,214 mi) distance. Renault's response was to build a new land speed car.

The new car's bodywork was once again designed by Riffard, and construction was handled by l'atelier 153. This car was based on the chassis of a Renault Vivasport, and used that model's 3.6 L (220 cu in) inline six-cylinder engine. Its long nose and ovoid front air intake were reminiscent of the Nervasport car, but the canopy over the driver reflected Riffard's aviation background, with a wrap-around windscreen and a roofline that dropped down much more sharply than the roofline of the Nervasport des Records, with no fin.

The car began its record attempt on 13 August 1934. At 7:45 pm Quatresous took the first shift, and was replaced by Fromentin at 10:45 pm, and then Berthelon at 1:45 am. At 3:30 am there was an accident that resulted in the car being destroyed in an explosion and subsequent fire, while Berthelon was thrown out of the car to his death.

=== Renault-Riffard ===
Riffard designed new aero bodywork for a car known as the Renault-Riffard Tank sometime between 1950 and 1954. Built on the chassis of an existing race car called the Guépard, this compact barquette had full-width "tank" style bodywork with the side profile of an airfoil cross-section. The bodywork was fabricated by Heuliez. Power came from a 4CV engine bored out to 904 cc (55.17 cu in), and fitted with an Autobleu cylinder head. Both engine and transmission had been moved to the front of the chassis.

=== Autobleu 750 Mille Miles ===
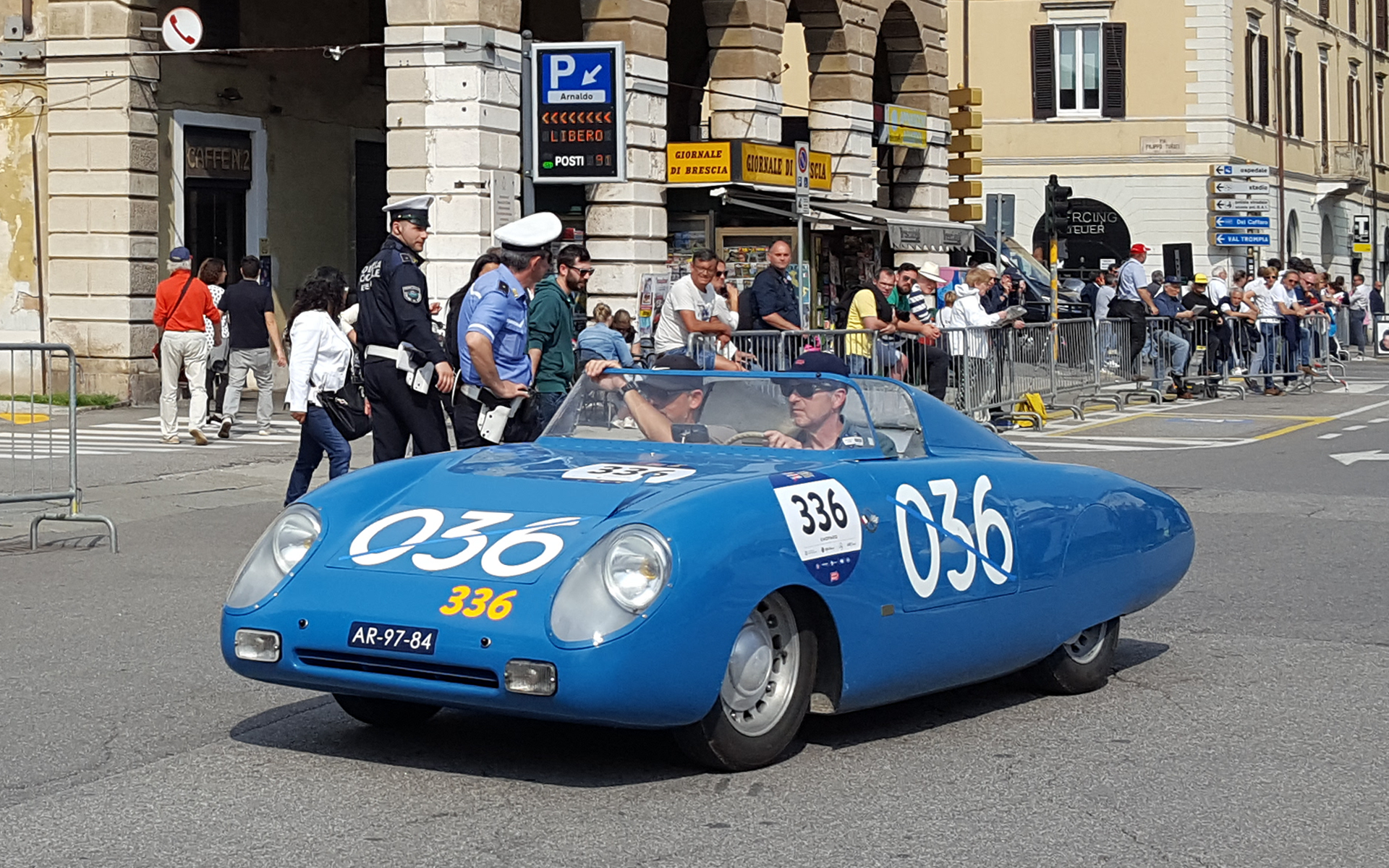
Autobleu 750 Mille Miles

For the 1954 Mille Miglia the Autobleu company produced its only works racing car; the model 750 Mille Miles (MM). The engine was a Renault Billancourt unit from the 4CV, but displacement was increased to 950 cc (58.0 cu in). The engine was tuned by Porsche, and developed 70 hp (52 kW). The streamlined body developed by Riffard was built by Carrosserie G.T.R. In the 1954 race it was driven by Jean Sigrand and Jean Bianchi, and went out due to an accident. It was entered in the 1955 Mille Miglia, but it is unclear whether it raced. It then ran in the 1956 12 Hours of Reims. Driven by Lucien Bianchi and Christian Poirot, it finished eleventh in class, and twenty-first overall.

=== Panhard X cars ===
In 1953 Panhard decided to become directly involved in racing. Paul Panhard established a racing team under director Etienne de Valance. During World War II (WWII), René Panhard had flown Caudron-Renault fighters, and he contacted Riffard to design their new endurance racers. Riffard produced designs for two of three of Panhard's own endurance racers; the X88, and X89. As there were no corresponding Dyna X series X88 or X89, these designations were specific to the racing cars built by Panhard.

Panhard X88 Riffard's original 1953 Le Mans barquette bodywork was wide and low, with a flat tapering tail. The car's chassis was of light alloy, with bodywork of Duralinox. The passenger compartment was faired in except for an opening for the driver, with a raised headrest as part of the bodywork behind his seat. At the front, the leading edges of the fenders projected forward, and during some events were capped by conspicuous forward-facing conical covers. The first X88 was powered by a 610 cc (37.2 cu in) Panhard twin. The body of the X88 was revised more than once, first to a more traditional sportscar style with exposed headlamps, then to a smooth curving nose with covered lamps.

Panhard X89 The original bodywork for the 1953 Le Mans car was similar in appearance to that of the X88 and was also of Duralinox. The X89, however, was powered by the larger 848 cc (51.7 cu in) Panhard twin. As with the X88, the X89's body was later revised, with at least one car being bodied as a closed berlinette with a smooth curving nose.

Panhard's next racing car, the VM5, was designed by engineer Pierre Durand. After the accident at Le Mans in 1955, Panhard withdrew from direct racing involvement, and Monopole became Panhard's officially supported racing team. The cars were transferred to Écurie Monopole and raced as Panhard-Monopoles.

== Personal life and death ==
On 6 November 1916, after a seven-year engagement, Riffard married. The couple had three sons.

In addition to his ability as a mathematician, aerodynamicist, and engineer, Riffard's personal pursuits included music, bel canto, and painting.

Riffard died at Versailles in the Yvelines on 9 July 1981 and is buried in Chaville in the Hauts-de-Seine.

== Memberships ==
Riffard was a member of the Board of l'Aéro-Club de France.

He was Honorary President of the Commission d'Aviation.

Riffard also served as the French representative at the Commission Aéronautique of the Fédération Aéronautique Internationale.

== Honours ==
- Croix de Guerre 1914–1918
- Officier de la Légion d'honneur
- Commandeur de l'ordre national du Mérite
- 1956 recipient of La grande médaille de l’Aéro-Club de France
- Riffard and his work were memorialized in a series of murals painted at the Gare de Chaville.
