= Caudron C.460 =

1930s French racing aircraft

C.450 and C.460
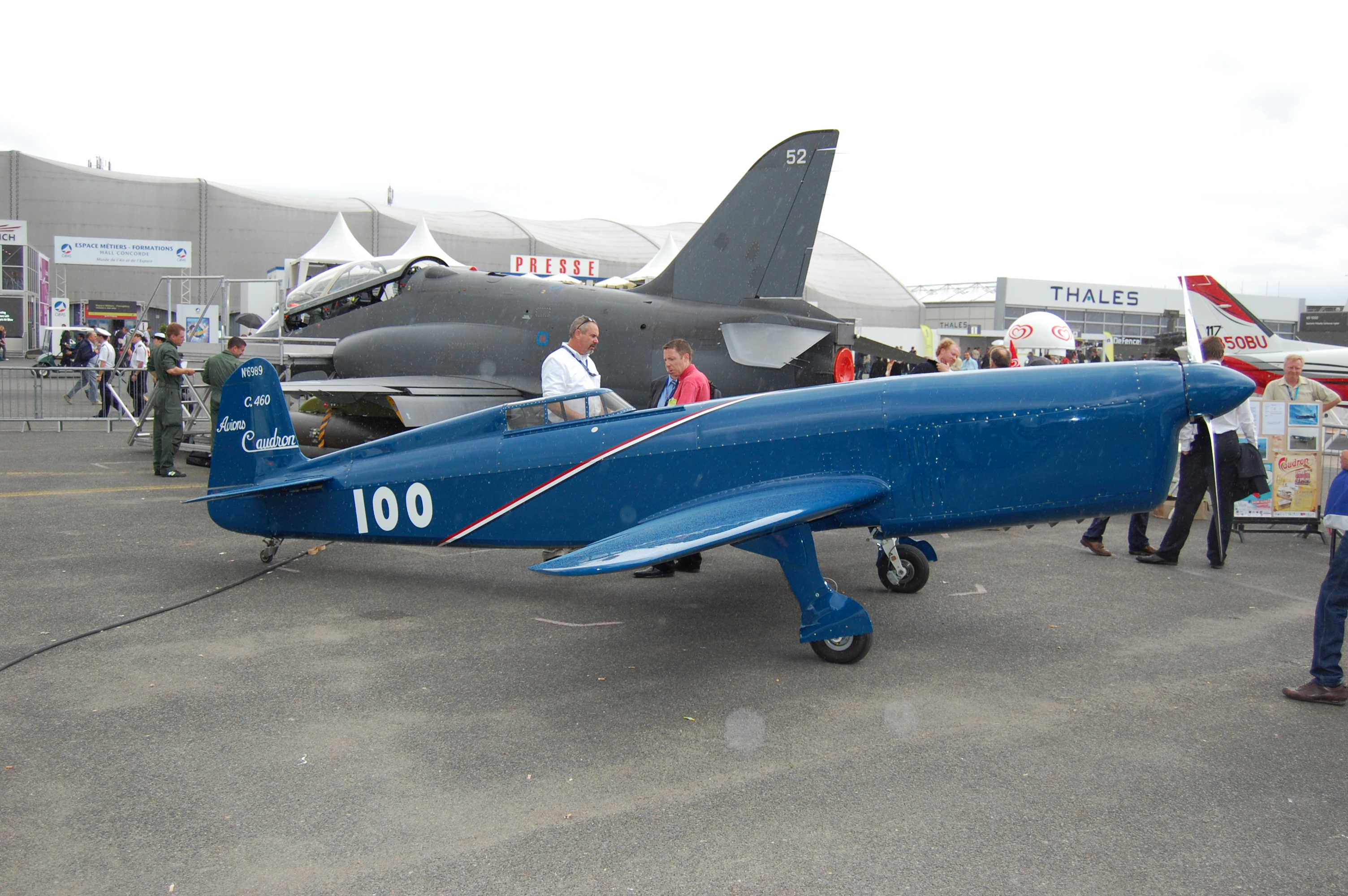
- Flying replica of the Caudron C.460 at Paris Air Show 2009.

General information
- Type: Racing aircraft
- Manufacturer: Caudron
- Designer: Marcel Riffard
- Number built: 6

History
- First flight: 1934

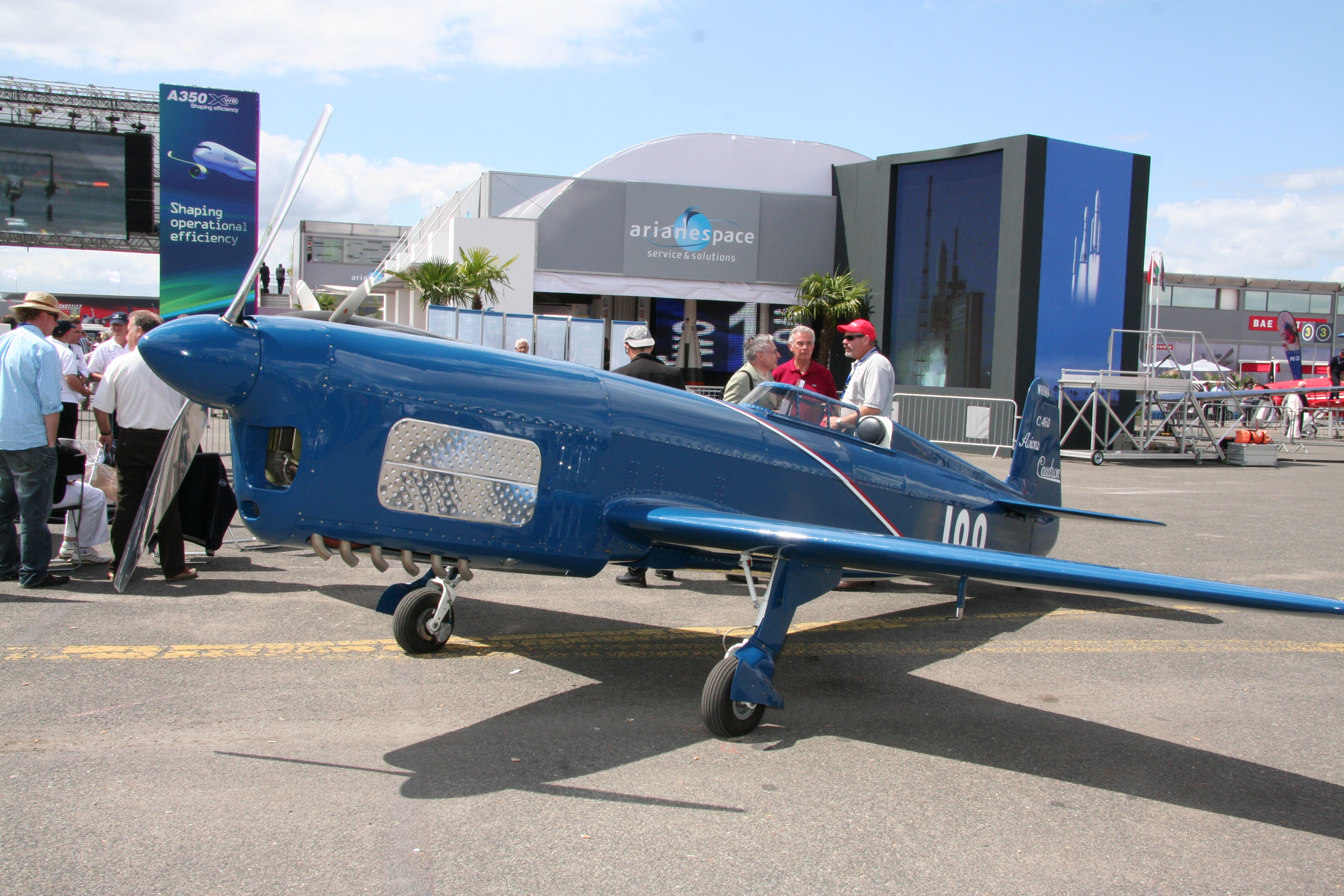
Modern reproduction of a Caudron C.460 at the Paris Air Show 2009.

The Caudron C.450 and C.460 were French racing aircraft built to participate in the Coupe Deutsch de la Meurthe race of 1934.

== Design ==
Developed from the Caudron C.362 flown in the previous year's race, a single C.450 and three C.460s were built for the 1934 event. All were powered by a supercharged Renault 456 six-cylinder inverted air-cooled engine driving a Ratier two-position variable-pitch propeller. The airframe was primarily built from spruce and birch plywood, with steel and alloy engine bearers and magnesium cowling and fuel tanks. The wings were fitted with split flaps and the angle of incidence of the tailplane could be varied while in flight. The principal difference between the types was that the C.450 had a fixed spatted undercarriage, while the C.460 had a retractable undercarriage. This difference resulted in structural differences, the retractable undercarriage necessitating a two-spar wing for the C.460 in contrast to the single-spar wing used by the C.450.

For the 1936 Coupe de la Meurthe competition Caudron built two examples of a development of the C.460, the C.461. This was slightly larger, 8.185 metres (26 ft 10 in) long with a wingspan of 6.75 metres (22 ft 2 in) and weighing 661 kilograms (1,457 lb) empty and had a radically redesigned cockpit, the top being flush with the top of the fuselage and forward vision being limited to what could be seen through glazed-over semi-circular channels set into either side of the fuselage.

== Service history ==
In the 1934 Coupe de la Meurthe the C.450 took first place, piloted by Maurice Arnoux, and one of the C.460s took third, piloted by Albert Monville. The C.460s had been handicapped by problems with the retractable undercarriage, which resulted in them flying with the undercarriage fixed in the down position during the contest.

On 22 May 1934, flying the C.450, Raymond Delmotte set a world record for light aircraft over 100 km of 431.65 km/h (268.21 mph). In August that year, Hélène Boucher set an airspeed record for aircraft in its class with the C.450, of 455 km/h (284 mph) and on Christmas Day 1934 Delmotte set a new airspeed record for light aircraft over a 3 km course of 505.85 km/h (314.32 mph) in a C.460.

A C.460 won the Coupe Deutsch de la Meurthe in 1935, piloted by Delmotte, with an average speed of 443.96 km/h (277.5 mph).

In 1936, a C.460, piloted by Michel Detroyat, also won the Greve Trophy and Thompson Trophy at the 1936 National Air Races in the United States.

The 1936 Coupe Deutsch de la Meurthe was won by Yves Lacombe flying the C.450. At the end of the first leg of the race Arnoux, flying one of the C.461s, was leading, having completed the 1000 km at a speed of 414.818 km/h (257.756 mph) ahead of Lacombe, whose speed was 403.818 km/h (250.921 mph); the C.461 flown by Delmotte had retired after losing an exhaust pipe. However, technical problems delayed the start of both aircraft for the second leg of the race, and since any time on the ground beyond the allotted hour and a half was counted as flight time, Lacombe, who had not been delayed as long as Arnoux, won the contest, with a speed of 389.462 km/h (242.000 mph). Delmotte achieved the fastest single lap, at a speed of 432.175 km/h (268.541 mph).

In January 2009 a LOM-powered replica of the C.460 was built by a team including Tom Wathen, Mark Lightsey, Aerocraftsman Inc. and students of the Wathen Aviation High School. The aircraft was displayed at the Paris Air Show in 2009.

== Variants ==
C.450
(one built)
C.460
(three built)
C.461
(two built)

== Specifications (C.460) ==
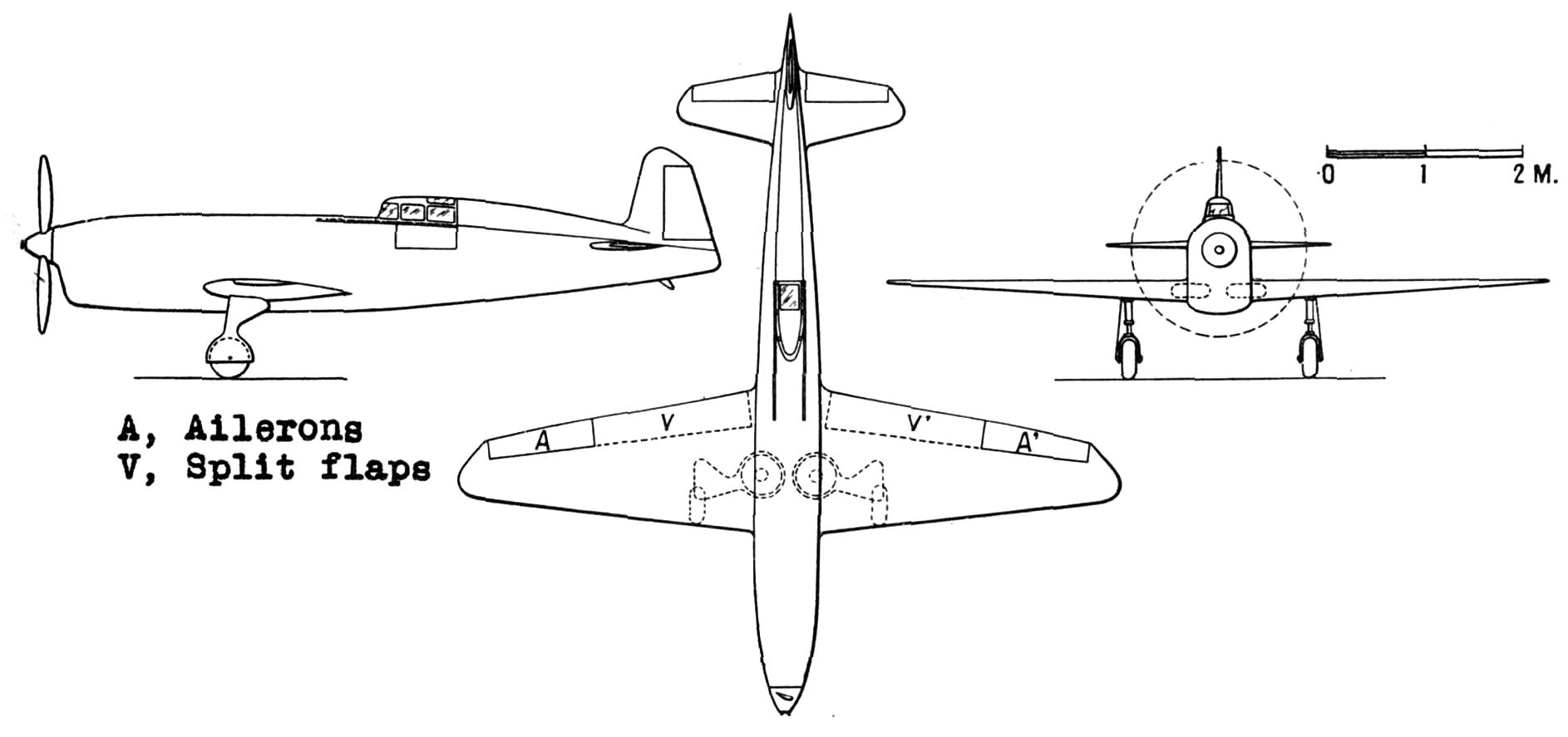
Caudron C.460 3-view drawing from NACA-TM-765

Data from The Caudron Plane Flight, 17 May 1934

General characteristics

- Crew: 1
- Length: 7.11 m (23 ft 4 in)
- Wingspan: 6.75 m (22 ft 2 in)
- Wing area: 7.0 m^{2} (73.35 sq ft)
- Empty weight: 520 kg (1,146 lb)
- Gross weight: 875 kg (1,929 lb)
- Powerplant: 1 × Renault 456 supercharged inverted 6-cylinder air-cooled piston engine , 231 kW (310 hp)

Performance

- Maximum speed: 500 km/h (310 mph, 270 kn)

== See also ==
Dassault Rafale, a 4.5th Generation Multi-role aircraft.

== Bibliography ==
- Roux, Robert J. (May–June 1969). "Le Caudron-Renault 460". Le Album de Fanatique de l'Aviation (in French) (1): 8–9. ISSN 0757-4169.
- Taylor, Michael J. H. (1989). Jane's Encyclopedia of Aviation. London: Studio Editions. p. 240.
