= Caudron C.690 =

Single-seat training aircraft

C.690
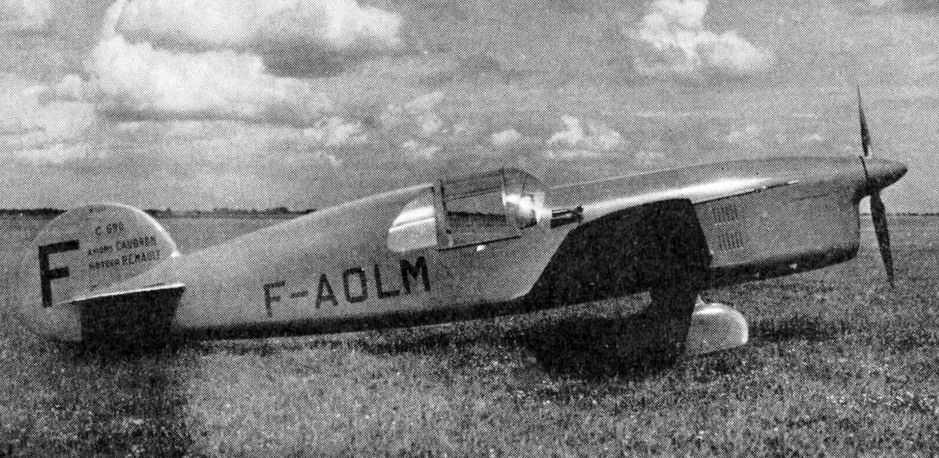

General information
- Type: Fighter trainer
- Manufacturer: Caudron
- Designer: Marcel Riffard
- Number built: 19

History
- First flight: 18 February 1936

The Caudron C.690 was a single-seat training aircraft developed in France in the late 1930s to train fighter pilots to handle high-performance aircraft. It was a conventional low-wing cantilever monoplane that bore a strong resemblance to designer Marcel Riffard's racer designs of the same period. Caudron attempted to attract overseas sales for the aircraft, but this resulted in orders for only two machines - one from Japan, and the other from the USSR. In the meantime, the first of two prototypes was destroyed in a crash that killed René Paulhan, Caudron's chief test pilot.

Despite this, the Armée de l'Air eventually showed interest in the type, and ordered a batch of a slightly refined design. The first of these was not delivered until April 1939, and only 15 C.690Ms were supplied before the outbreak of war.

== Variants ==
C.690
Single-seat fighter trainer aircraft. Four aircraft built.
C.690M
Slightly refined version for the Armee de l'Air. Only 15 aircraft were built.

== Operators ==
France

- Armee de l'Air

Japan

- Imperial Japanese Air Force - One aircraft only (KXC1) .

Soviet Union

- soviet Air Force - One aircraft only.

== Specifications (C.690M) ==
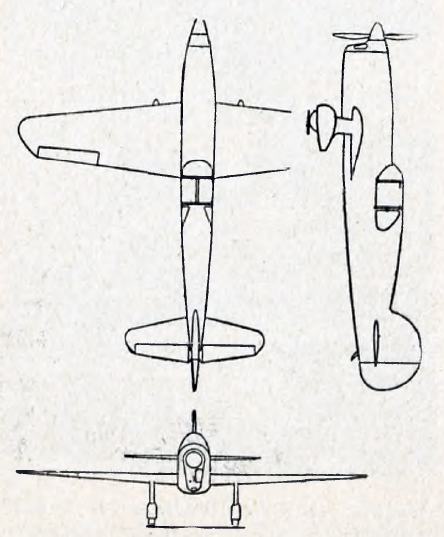
Caudron C.690

Data from Les Caudron-Renault d'Entrainement

General characteristics

- Crew: One pilot
- Length: 7.96 m (26 ft 1 in)
- Wingspan: 7.70 m (25 ft 3 in)
- Wing area: 9.0 m^{2} (97 sq ft)
- Empty weight: 747 kg (1,647 lb)
- Gross weight: 980 kg (2,161 lb)
- Powerplant: 1 × Renault 6Q-05 , 160 kW (220 hp)

Performance

- Maximum speed: 370 km/h (230 mph, 200 kn)
- Stall speed: 85 km/h (53 mph, 46 kn)
- Range: 1,100 km (680 mi, 590 nmi)
- Service ceiling: 9,700 m (31,800 ft)
- Rate of climb: 10.5 m/s (2,070 ft/min)

== See also ==
Related lists

- List of Interwar military aircraft

== Bibliography ==
- Cony, Christophe (December 2000). "Un pur-sang d'entraînement pour l'Armée de l'Air: Le Caudron C.690" [A Pure-blooded Trainer for the French Air Force]. Avions: Toute l'Aéronautique et son histoire (in French) (93): 19–24. ISSN 1243-8650.
- Cony, Christophe (January 2001). "Un pur-sang d'entraînement pour l'Armée de l'Air: Le Caudron C.690". Avions: Toute l'Aéronautique et son histoire (in French) (94): 17–22. ISSN 1243-8650.
- Kotelnikov, V.; Kulikov, V. & Cony, C. (November 2001). "Les avions français en URSS, 1921–1941" [French Aircraft in the USSR, 1921–1941]. Avions: Toute l'Aéronautique et son histoire (in French) (104): 37–43. ISSN 1243-8650.
- Mihaly, Edouard (January 1978). "Montures pour apprentis chasseurs... les Caudron-Renault d'entrainment, partie 1" [Mounts for Trainee Fighters... the Caudron-Renault Trainers, Part One]. Le Fana de l'Aviation (in French) (98): 8–13. ISSN 0757-4169.
- Mihaly, Edouard (February 1978). "Montures pour apprentis chasseurs... les Caudron-Renault d'entrainment, partie 2" [Mounts for Trainee Fighters... the Caudron-Renault Trainers, Part Two]. Le Fana de l'Aviation (in French) (99): 10–13. ISSN 0757-4169.
- Mihaly, Edouard (March 1978). "Les Caudron-Renault d'entrainment (3)". Le Fanatique de l'Aviation (in French). No. 100. pp. 20–24.
