= Régnier Motor Company =

French aircraft engine manufacturer

Régnier Motor Company (Fr:Société anonyme des établissements Emile Regnier) was a French aircraft engine manufacturer founded by Émile Régnier in the 1920s.

Régnier was a World War I flying ace. Postwar, he became the French agent for de Havilland. He displayed a Gipsy III and Gipsy Major at the 1932 Paris Air Show. He later built de Havilland Gipsy series engines under license. Some sources suggest that he began in the 1920s. According to Gunston he only began manufacture with the Gipsy Major and Gipsy Six, which appeared respectively in 1932 and 1933. These were both air-cooled inverted inline types, of four and six cylinders respectively, and shared many common parts.

By 1934, he began building his own inverted inline designs as the Régnier Motor Company. He developed an inverted air-cooled six-cylinder engine for use in a privately entered Caudron C.366 to compete in the Coupe Deutsch de Meurthe air race in 1934. The 217 brake horsepower motor was developed from the de Havilland Gipsy series he had been building under license. On 6 January 1934, one of his engines, mounted in a Caudron C.362, set a new 1,000-kilometer speed record of 332.8 km/h (206.8 mph) for light aircraft; this was six days too late to claim a 50,000-franc prize from the French air ministry. On 27 May 1934, it took second place in the 2,000 km Coupe Deutsch de Meurthe at virtually the same speed. The Régnier engine powered a Percival Mew Gull to victory in the Coupe Armand Esders in July 1935 at 302 km/h. By 1936, the Régnier R-6 engine was being supercharged by a Rootes blower; six different engine types were shown at the Paris Air Show. A supercharged inverted air-cooled V-12 Régnier debuted in early 1937, developing 450 hp.

One engine was licensed to Allied Aviation of Van Nuys, California. It received a U.S. Type Certificate in 1939 as the Allied Monsoon.

On 4 September 1940, Émile Régnier died, but his company continued and was subsequently captured by the Nazis after the invasion of France during World War II. It then became a supplier to the German military.

During the Occupation of France and in the years shortly after World War II, the Régnier company designed and produced a set of three simplified four-cylinder inverted air-cooled inline engines of increasing capacity and power, the 4J, 4K and 4L. In 1946 or 1947, Régnier, now nationalised, was absorbed into SNECMA and the 4L engines, the most widely used member of the series, became the SNECMA Régnier 4L. SNECMA continued to produce the 4L series until at least 1956. The most prolific type to use it was the military Nord NC.856A, with 112 examples.

== Aircraft engines ==
- Régnier R1
- Régnier 2
- Régnier 4B (derived from de Havilland Gipsy)
- Régnier 4D.2
- Régnier 4E.0
- Régnier 4F.0
- Régnier 4JO
- Régnier 4KO
- Régnier 4L in many variants.
- Régnier 4R
- Régnier 6B
- Régnier 6GO
- Régnier 6R
- Régnier 6RS
- Régnier R161-01
- Régnier Martinet
- Régnier 12Hoo
