= Caudron C.362 =

1930s French racing aircraft

C.362 and C.366
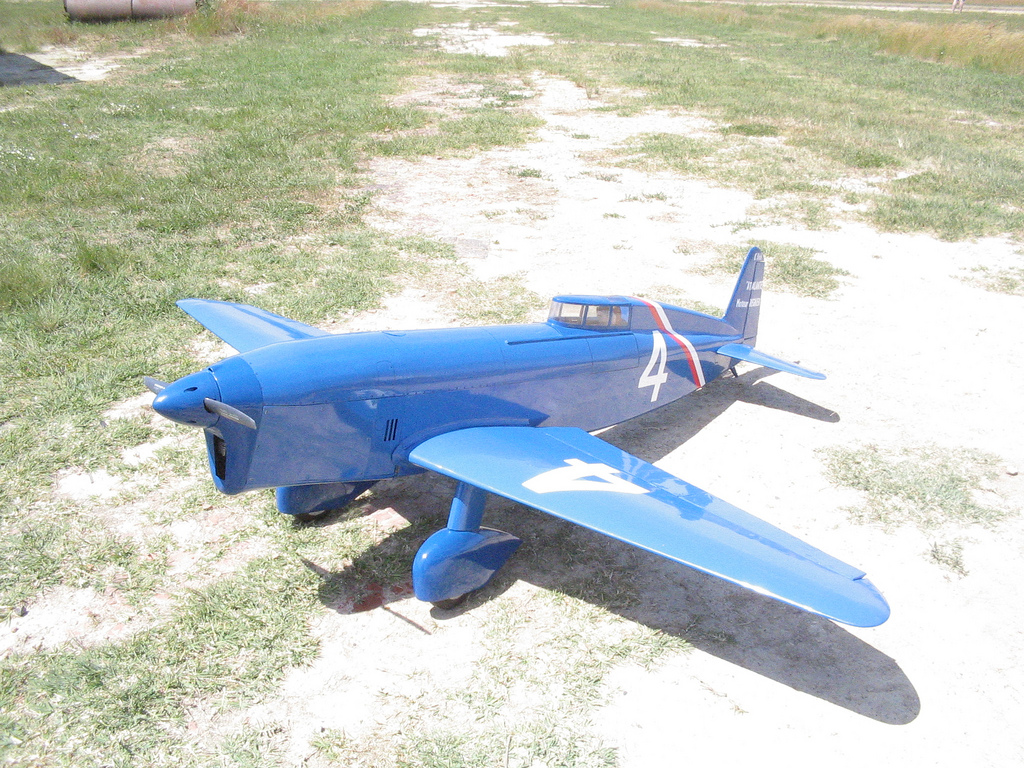
- A model of the C.366

General information
- Type: Racing aircraft
- Manufacturer: Caudron
- Designer: Marcel Riffard
- Number built: 3

History
- First flight: 1933
- Developed from: Caudron C.360

The Caudron C.362 and the almost identical C.366 were single-seat racing aircraft built in 1933 by Caudron to compete in the Coupe Deutsch de la Meurthe competition.

== Design ==
The C.362 and C.366 were single-seat, low-wing monoplanes with a fixed undercarriage. Construction was of wood, with a single-spar wing of symmetrical airfoil section, the spar having spruce flanges and a birch plywood web. It was equipped with split trailing edge flaps.

The principal difference between the two types was the powerplant employed. The C.362 was powered by a high-compression-ratio version of the Renault Bengali air-cooled inverted four-cylinder inline engine developing 127 kW (170 hp), while the C.366 was powered by a 157 kW (210 hp) Regnier air-cooled inverted 6-cylinder inline. It had been intended to use this engine for all three aircraft, but development problems with it resulted in the use of the Renault engine in two of the airframes that had been constructed.

The type was developed into the Caudron C.450 and C.460 racers, which won the Coupe Deutsch de la Meurthe in 1934, 1935 and 1936.

== Operational history ==
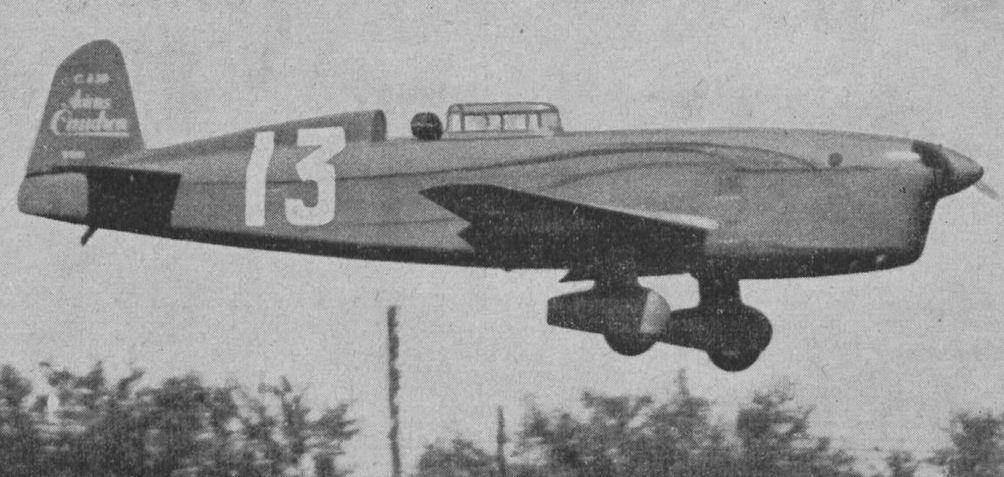
Caudron C.362 photo from L'Aerophile January 1942

During trials for the Coupe Deutsch de la Meurthe the C.362 was flown by Caudron's chief pilot Raymond Delmotte to establish two world speed records for light aircraft, covering 1,000 km (621 mi; 540 nmi) at 332.88 km/h (206.84 mph; 179.74 kn) and 100 km (62.1 mi; 54.0 nmi) at 333.77 km/h (207.40 mph; 180.22 kn) On 24 May Ludovic Arrachart was killed when his C.362 crashed after an engine failure while he was taking part in the trial flights for the Coupe. The following day the C.366, flown by Valot, was badly damaged in a landing accident, forcing its withdrawal from the competition. The remaining aircraft, flown by Delmotte, finished second in the contest, completing the 2,000 kilometres (1,243 mi; 1,080 nmi) in 6h 52m 5s, a speed of 317.04 km/h (197.00 mph; 171.19 kn).

On 26 December 1934 Delmotte set a new record over 100 km (62.1 mi; 54.0 nmi) of 334.67 km/h (207.95 mph; 180.71 kn), and on 2 May 1935 Delmotte raised this to 345.62 km/h (214.76 mph; 186.62 kn).

The C.366 was flown to second place in the 1934 Coupe Deutsch de la Meurth by Louis Masotte, fitted with a Levasseur variable-pitch propeller.

== Specifications (C.362) ==
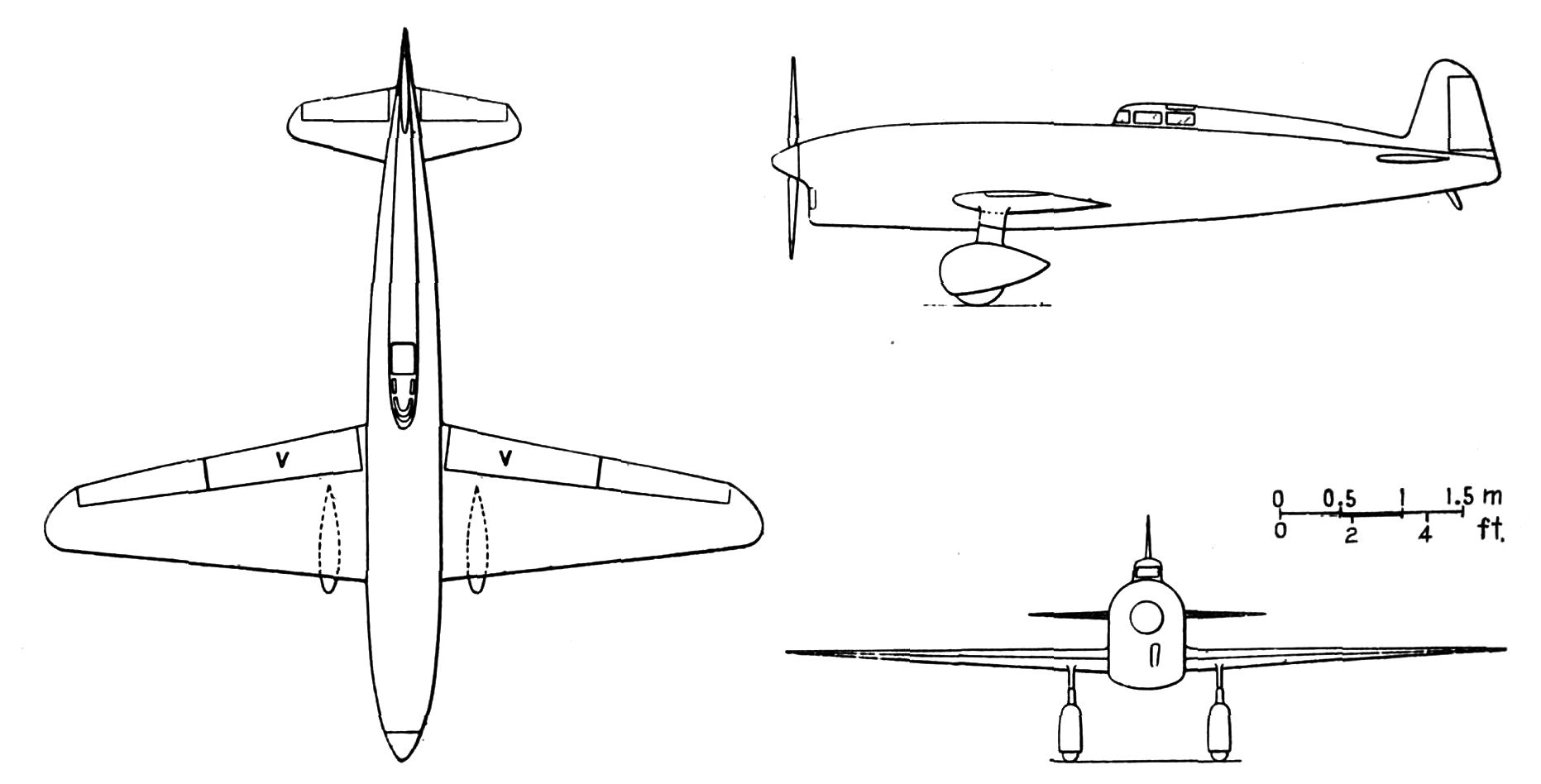
Caudron C.360 3-view drawing from NACA-TM-724

Data from

General characteristics

- Crew: 1
- Length: 6.6 m (21 ft 8 in)
- Wingspan: 6.8 m (22 ft 4 in)
- Wing area: 7 m^{2} (75 sq ft)
- Empty weight: 405 kg (893 lb)
- Gross weight: 695 kg (1,532 lb)
- Fuel capacity: 280 L (74.0 US gal; 61.6 imp gal)
- Oil capacity: 20 L (5.3 US gal; 4.4 imp gal)
- Powerplant: 1 × Renault 4Pei Bengali Junior 4-cylinder inverted inline air-cooled piston engine, 130 kW (170 hp)
- Propellers: 2-bladed Ratier ground adjustable pitch propeller

Performance

- Maximum speed: 350 km/h (220 mph, 190 kn)
- Wing loading: 100 kg/m^{2} (20 lb/sq ft)
