= Plémy =

Plémy Plevig
- Commune
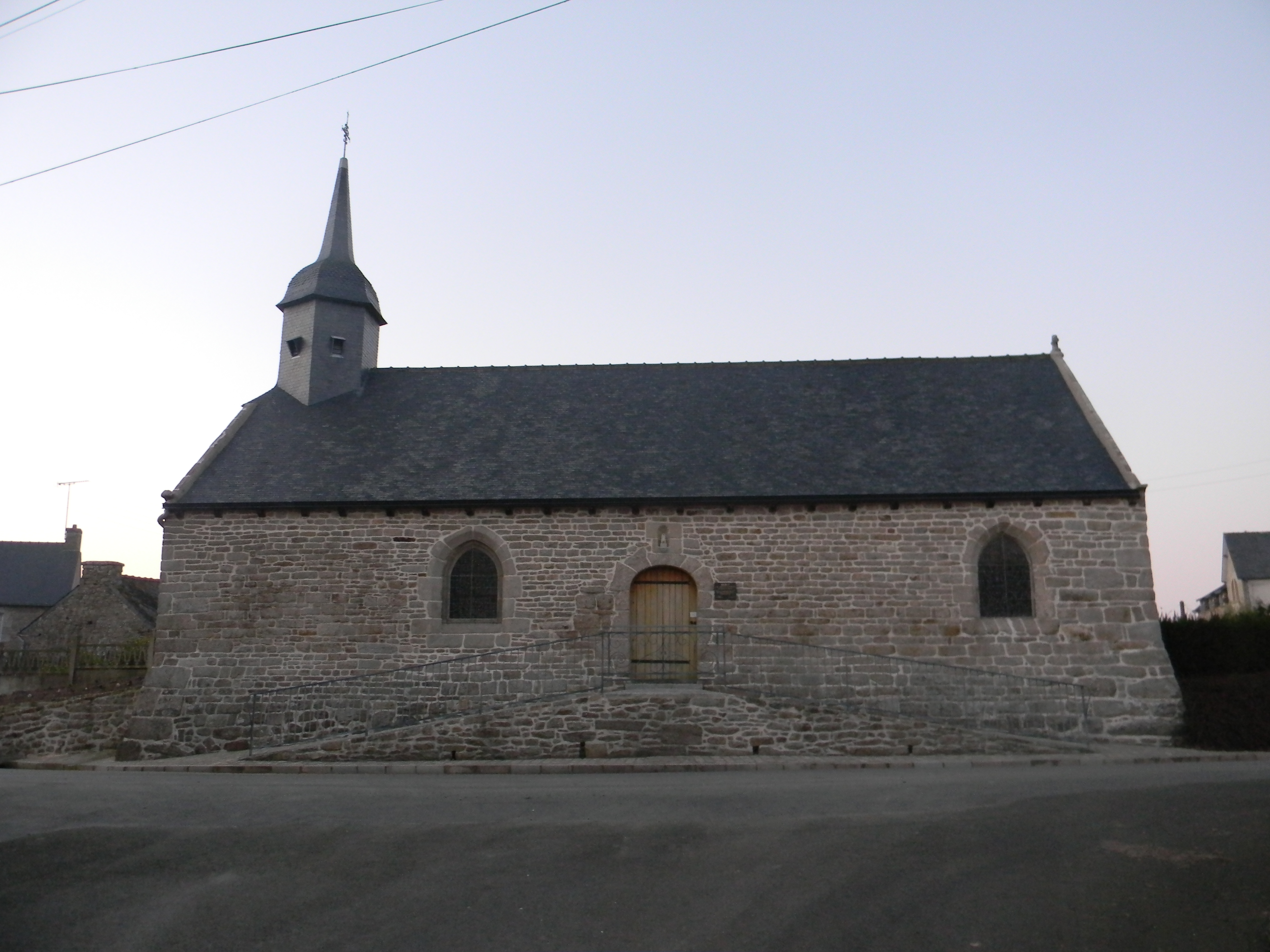
- The chapel of Saint Laurent, in Plémy
- Location of Plémy
- Location within France Location within Brittany
- Coordinates: 48°20′14″N 2°40′56″W
- Country: France
- Region: Brittany
- Department: Côtes-d'Armor
- Arrondissement: Saint-Brieuc
- Canton: Plaintel
- Intercommunality: CA Lamballe Terre et Mer

Government
  - Mayor (2020–2026): Michel Richard
- Area^{1}: 40.04 km^{2} (15.46 sq mi)
- Highest elevation: 256 m (840 ft)
- Lowest elevation: 124 m (407 ft)
- Population (2023): 1,578
  - Density: 39.41/km^{2} (102.1/sq mi)
- Time zone: UTC+01:00 (CET)
  - Summer (DST): UTC+02:00 (CEST)
- INSEE/Postal code: 22184 /22150
- ^{1} French Land Register data, which excludes lakes, ponds, glaciers > 1 km^{2} (0.386 sq mi or 247 acres) and river estuaries.

Plémy (French pronunciation: [plemi]; Breton: Plevig; Gallo: Plémic) is a commune in the Côtes-d'Armor department of Brittany in northwestern France.

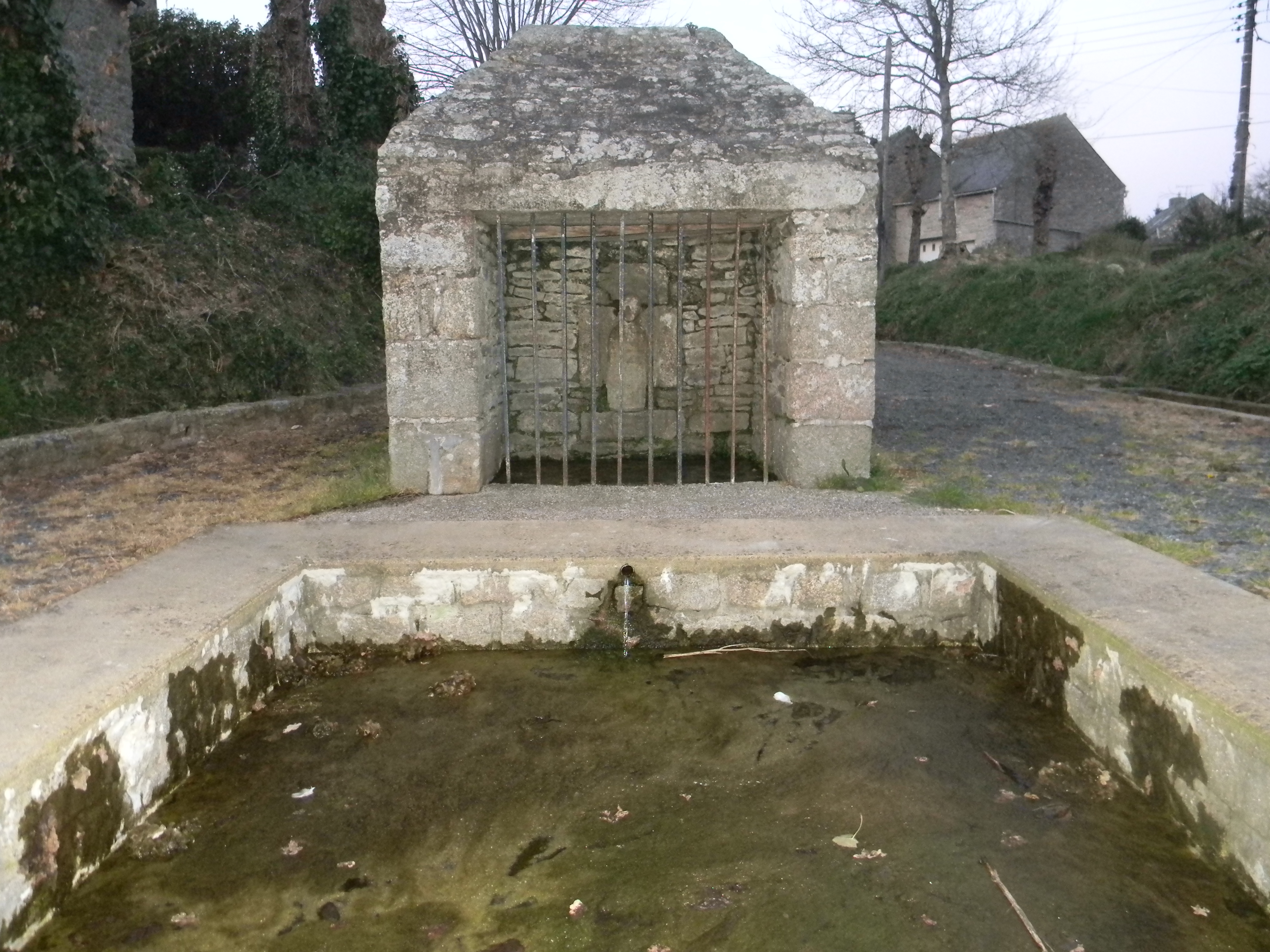
Saint Laurent fountain

== Population ==
Historical population
Year	Pop.	±% p.a.
1968	1,704	—
1975	1,621	−0.71%
1982	1,580	−0.37%
1990	1,470	−0.90%
1999	1,524	+0.40%
2007	1,616	+0.74%
2012	1,611	−0.06%
2017	1,572	−0.49%
2023	1,578	+0.06%
Source: INSEE

Inhabitants of Plémy are called plémytains or plémytens in French.

== See also ==
- Communes of the Côtes-d'Armor department
