= Caudron C.360 =

1930s French aircraft

C.360

General information
- National origin: France
- Manufacturer: Caudron
- Number built: 3

History
- Variant: Caudron C.362

The Caudron C.360 was a French racing aircraft built by Caudron in the early 1930s to compete in Coupe Deutsch de la Meurthe air races.

== Design ==
The C.360 was a low-wing monoplane racer design to be powered by one 205 hp (153 kW) Régnier 6 engine, but lack of availability required the use of 170 hp (130 kW) Renault 4Pei Bengali engines in two of the three aircraft, which were re-designated C.362. The third C.360 airframe was completed with a 215 hp (160 kW) Régnier 6 engine and was re-designated C.366 Martinet.

== Variants ==
C.360
Original design for a racing aircraft powered by a 205 hp (153 kW) Régnier 6 engine; Three built, completed as C.362 and C.366 racers.
C.362
Two of the C.360 airframes powered by 170 hp (130 kW) Renault 4Pei Bengali engines.
C.366 Martinet
The third C.360 airframe completed with a 215 hp (160 kW) Régnier 6 engine and flush cockpit, the pilot sitting on an adjustable seat behind an extending windshield.

== Specifications (C.366 Martinet) ==
Data from

General characteristics

- Crew: 1
- Length: 6.88 m (22 ft 7 in)
- Wingspan: 6.8 m (22 ft 4 in)
- Height: 1.9 m (6 ft 3 in)
- Wing area: 7 m^{2} (75 sq ft)
- Empty weight: 475 kg (1,047 lb)
- Gross weight: 765 kg (1,687 lb)
- Powerplant: 1 × Régnier Martinet 6-cylinder super-charged air-cooled in-line piston engine, 160 kW (215 hp)

Performance

- Maximum speed: 370 km/h (230 mph, 200 kn)
