= Caproni Ca.602 =

1930s Italian aircraft

Ca.602
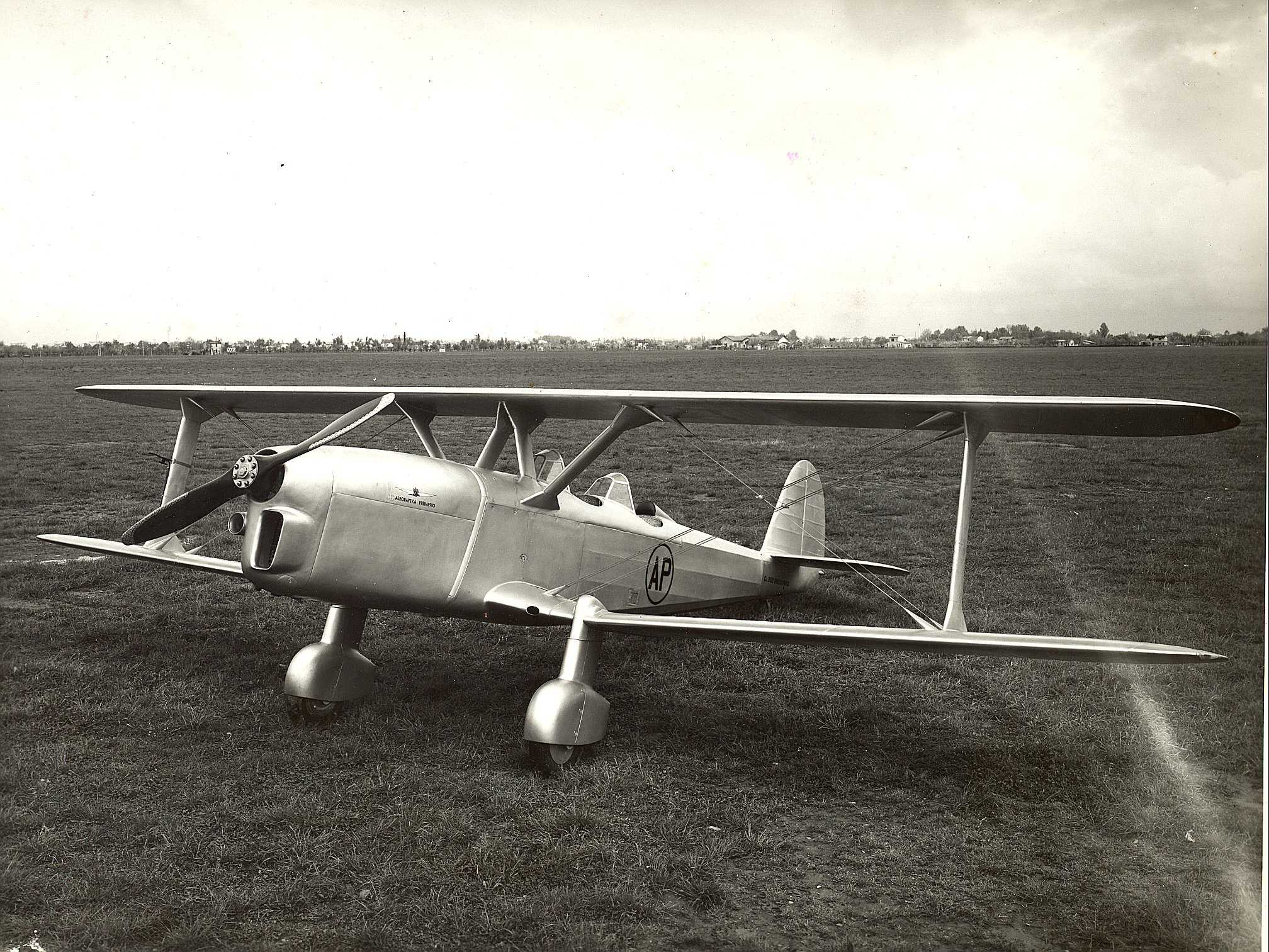

General information
- Type: Aerobatics trainer
- National origin: Italy
- Manufacturer: Caproni
- Designer: Raffaele Conflenti
- Number built: 1

History
- Variant: Caproni Ca.603

The Caproni Ca.602 was a two-seat training aircraft built in Italy by Caproni in the 1930s at the Aeronautica Predappio factory. A single-seat aerobatic trainer was also built, as the Caproni Ca.603, featured reduced wing area, strengthened structure and inter-connected ailerons on upper and lower mainplanes.

== Variants ==
Ca.602
two-seat trainer
Ca.603
single-seat aerobatic version of the Ca.602

== Specifications (Ca.602) ==
Data from

General characteristics

- Crew: 2
- Length: 6.6 m (21 ft 8 in)
- Wingspan: 9 m (29 ft 6 in)
- Height: 2.54 m (8 ft 4 in)
- Wing area: 16.0 m^{2} (172 sq ft)
- Empty weight: 469 kg (1,034 lb)
- Gross weight: 728 kg (1,606 lb)
- Powerplant: 1 × Alfa Romeo 115-1 6-cylinder inverted air-cooled in-line piston engine, 153 kW (205 hp)
- Propellers: 2-bladed fixed pitch propeller

Performance

- Maximum speed: 275 km/h (171 mph, 148 kn)
- Landing speed: 100 km/h (62 mph; 54 kn)
- Range: 600 km (370 mi, 320 nmi)
- Endurance: 2 hours 30 minutes
- Service ceiling: 7,000 m (23,000 ft)
- Time to altitude: 4,000 m (13,000 ft) in 14 minutes
