= Caproni Ca.603 =

1940s Italian training aircraft

Ca.603
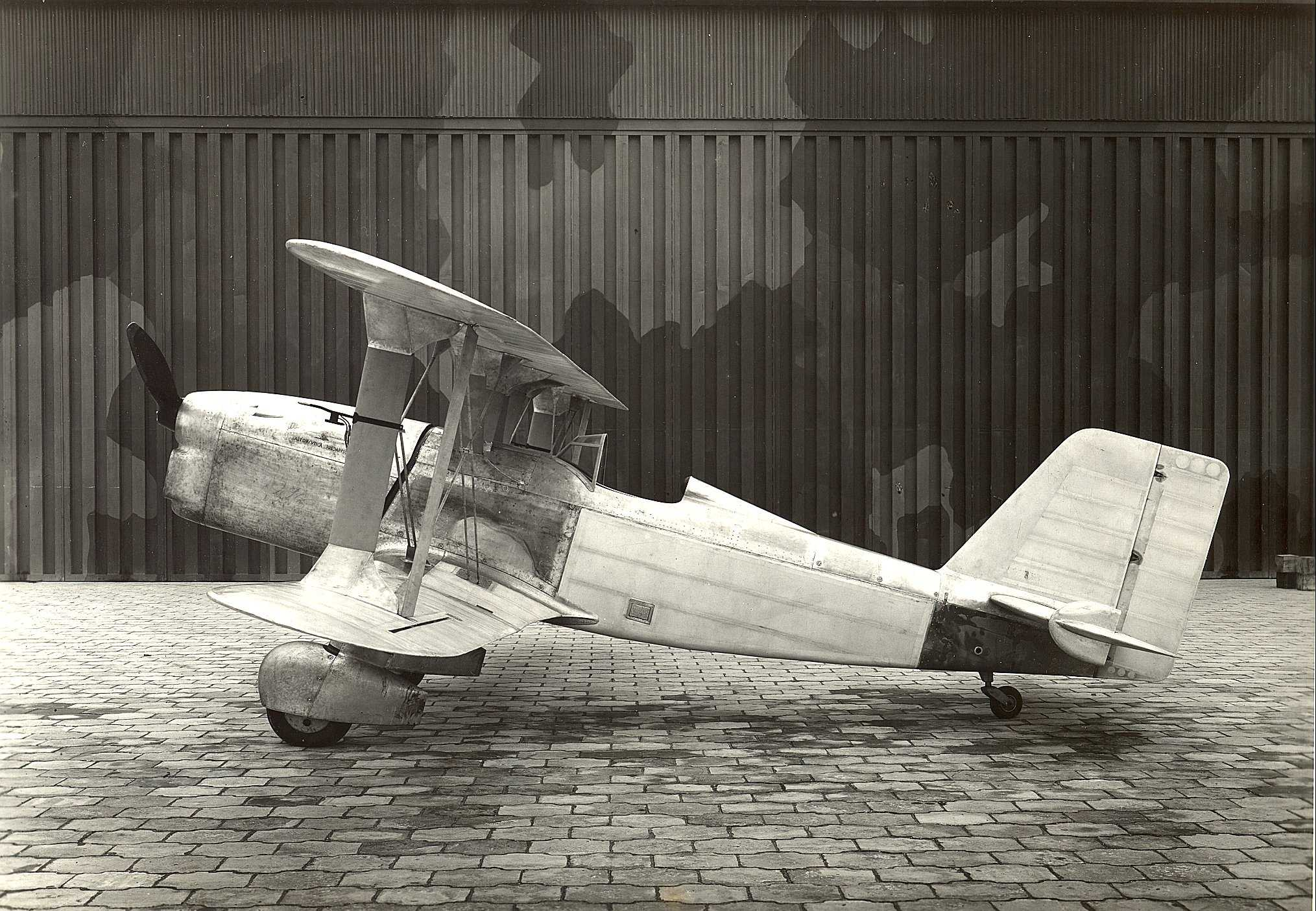

General information
- Type: Aerobatics trainer
- National origin: Italy
- Manufacturer: Caproni
- Designer: Raffaele Conflenti
- Number built: 1

History
- First flight: 1940
- Retired: 1943
- Developed from: Caproni Ca.602

The Caproni Ca.603 was an aerobatic training aircraft built in Italy by Caproni in the early 1940s.

== Design ==
The Ca.603 was derived from the training two-seater Ca.602 but differed in having a smaller wing surface and a more reinforced structure, with sturdy interconnecting uprights between the upper and lower wings. The aircraft had the fuselage in steel tubes welded and covered up to the passenger compartment, by duralumin panels; the remaining part of the fuselage was in canvas. The wings were of the same opening, based on a wooden two- sided beam; the leading edge and the end were covered with plywood, while the rest of the wing was covered in canvas. The wings were connected to each other by tubular steel uprights stanched and braced by tie rods; the fairing cart was fixed, with independent wheels, with the swiveling rear wheel and open steering position. The full tail was redesigned and decidedly wider.

== Development ==
In tests conducted between November and December 1940 the acrobatic performances were judged excellent, except in the figure of the screw probably due to the excessive size of the tail plans. However it was judged as the best acrobatic airplane in existence; however, they proposed changes concerning the change of the wing profile with the progress of the passenger compartment, and also possibly the modification of the vertical embedment both in length and in the design.

The only example in May 1942 was transferred to the Rome-Centocelle airport; after 1943 the traces of the aircraft were lost.

== Variants ==
Ca.602
two-seat trainer
Ca.603
single-seat aerobatic version of the Ca.602

== Specifications (Ca.603) ==
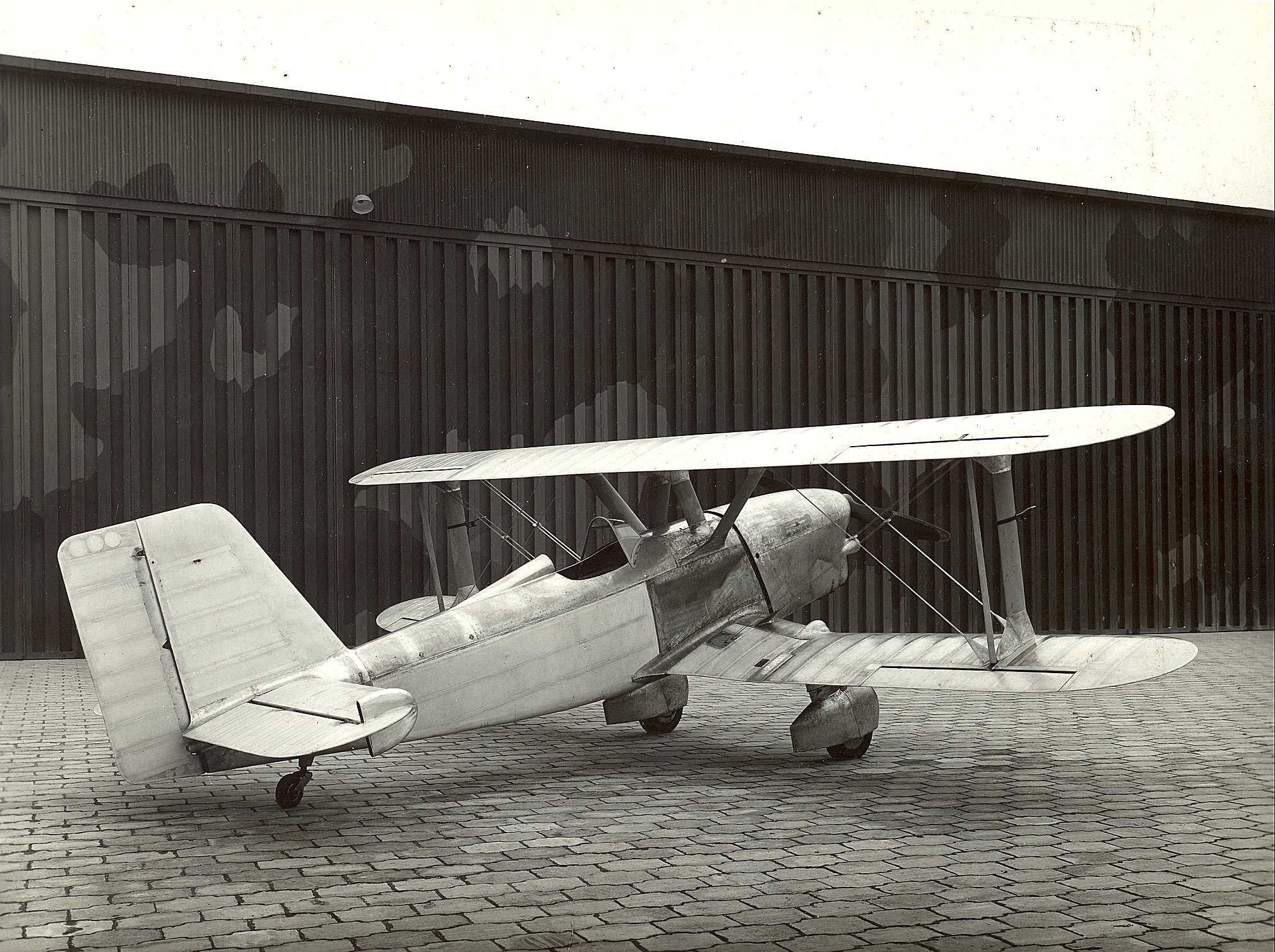
3/4 rear view

Data from

General characteristics

- Crew: 2
- Length: 6.5 m (21 ft 4 in)
- Wingspan: 7.493 m (24 ft 7 in)
- Height: 2.6 m (8 ft 6 in)
- Wing area: 13 m^{2} (140 sq ft)
- Empty weight: 699 kg (1,540 lb)
- Gross weight: 868 kg (1,914 lb)
- Powerplant: 1 × Alfa Romeo 115-1 6-cylinder inverted air-cooled in-line piston engine, 153 kW (205 hp)
- Propellers: 2-bladed fixed pitch propeller

Performance

- Maximum speed: 280 km/h (170 mph, 150 kn)
- Landing speed:105 km/h (65 mph; 57 kn)
- Service ceiling: 7,200 m (23,600 ft)
- Time to altitude: 4,000 m (13,000 ft) in 13 minutes
