= Island X-199 Spectra =

X-199 Spectra
- 3-view

General information
- Type: Technology demonstrator
- National origin: United States
- Manufacturer: Island Aircraft Corporation
- Designer: LeRoy LoPresti
- Status: Canceled
- Number built: 1

History
- First flight: 1969

The Island X-199 Spectra was a prototype technology demonstrator designed to test several concepts in amphibian aircraft design in anticipation of a future production variant. Originally known as the "Spectra", it later was renamed for marketing purposes, the "X-199".

== Design and development ==
LeRoy LoPresti, a former Grumman engineer, and president of the Island Aircraft Corporation, designed the Spectra in 1969 by as a technology demonstrator that aimed at new levels of versatility, performance and safety in a small amphibian aircraft. The two-seat Spectra featured a unique configuration in mounting its piston engine in a nacelle on the vertical T-tail. This engineering decision led to less drag compared to a separate pylon and nacelle as well moving the engine and propeller above the spray generated in water operation. The streamlined fuselage design also incorporated a retractable hull step that dramatically reduced the drag penalties of contemporary amphibian designs.

Designed for simplicity of construction and modification, the Spectra had Vultee BT-13 outer wing panels with unique dropping wing tips that also acted as stabilizing floats. Construction included all-metal control surfaces, aluminum bulkheads as well as the tail assembly utilizing Spruce spars and wooden ribs and a tubular steel engine mount.

Island Aircraft Corporation first utilized a 1/6th scale radio controlled engineering test model. The fully proportional ailerons, rudder, elevator, throttle and flap controls closely correspond to the full scale vehicle. Over 20 flights were made with the scale model.

After extensive taxi tests, the sole Spectra prototype, registered as N9168, made its maiden flight in 1969. The technology demonstrator was intended to be the pattern aircraft for a future larger, and more powerful (300 hp Lycoming O-540 engine), four-seat production variant, the Spectra IV, planned for introduction in 1972. The definitive production variant would have a tricycle landing gear with the main units retracting into the wings while the nose gear would retract forward to act as a bumper for beaching and docking operations.

== Operational history ==
The Spectra prototype flew as a flying boat and did not have true amphibian capability. Despite receiving favourable notices from aviation professionals and garnering enthusiastic media reviews, Island Aircraft Corporation was not able to elicit further interest from investors and did not secure any serious market ventures to proceed with production plans. The sole Spectra built had its Flight Certificate revoked in 1977, and now sits derelict at the former Island Aircraft hangar in Merritt Island, Florida.

== Variants ==
Spectra 2
1/6th scale radio controlled engineering test model
Spectra X-199
The two-seat prototype for the series; not configured for amphibian use
Spectra IV
Enlarged four-seat variant, using a more powerful 300 hp engine; intended for production but never built.

== Specifications (Spectra X-199) ==
Data from Jane's All the World's Aircraft, 1970-71 (Note: Performance data is based on the proposed Spectra IV variant.)

General characteristics

- Crew: one
- Capacity: one passenger/observer
- Length: 27 ft 10 in (8.48 m)
- Wingspan: 32 ft 8 in (9.96 m)
- Height: 8 ft 11 in (2.72 m)
- Empty weight: 2,800 lb (1,270 kg)
- Gross weight: 3,300 lb (1,496 kg)
- Fuel capacity: 90 US gal (340 L) (two wing tanks of 25 USgal and one fuselage tank of 40 USgal))
- Powerplant: 1 × Lycoming O-290 4-cyl. horizontally opposed air-cooled piston engine, 125 hp (93 kW)
- Propellers: 2-bladed reversible-pitch

Performance

- Maximum speed: 188 kn (217 mph, 349 km/h)
- Cruise speed: 165 kn (190 mph, 306 km/h)
- Stall speed: 57 kn (65 mph, 105 km/h)
- Range: 1,042 nmi (1,200 mi, 1,931 km)

== See also ==
Aircraft of comparable role, configuration, and era

- AirMax SeaMax
- Icon A5
- LISA Akoya
- MVP Model 3
- Nordic Omsider
- Osprey GP3 Osprey 2
- Progressive Aerodyne SeaRey
- Vickers Aircraft Wave
- Osprey 2
- Quikkit Glass Goose
- Volmer VJ-22 Sportsman

Related lists

- List of flying boats and floatplanes
