= AeroVolga Borey =

Russian ultralight aircraft

Borey
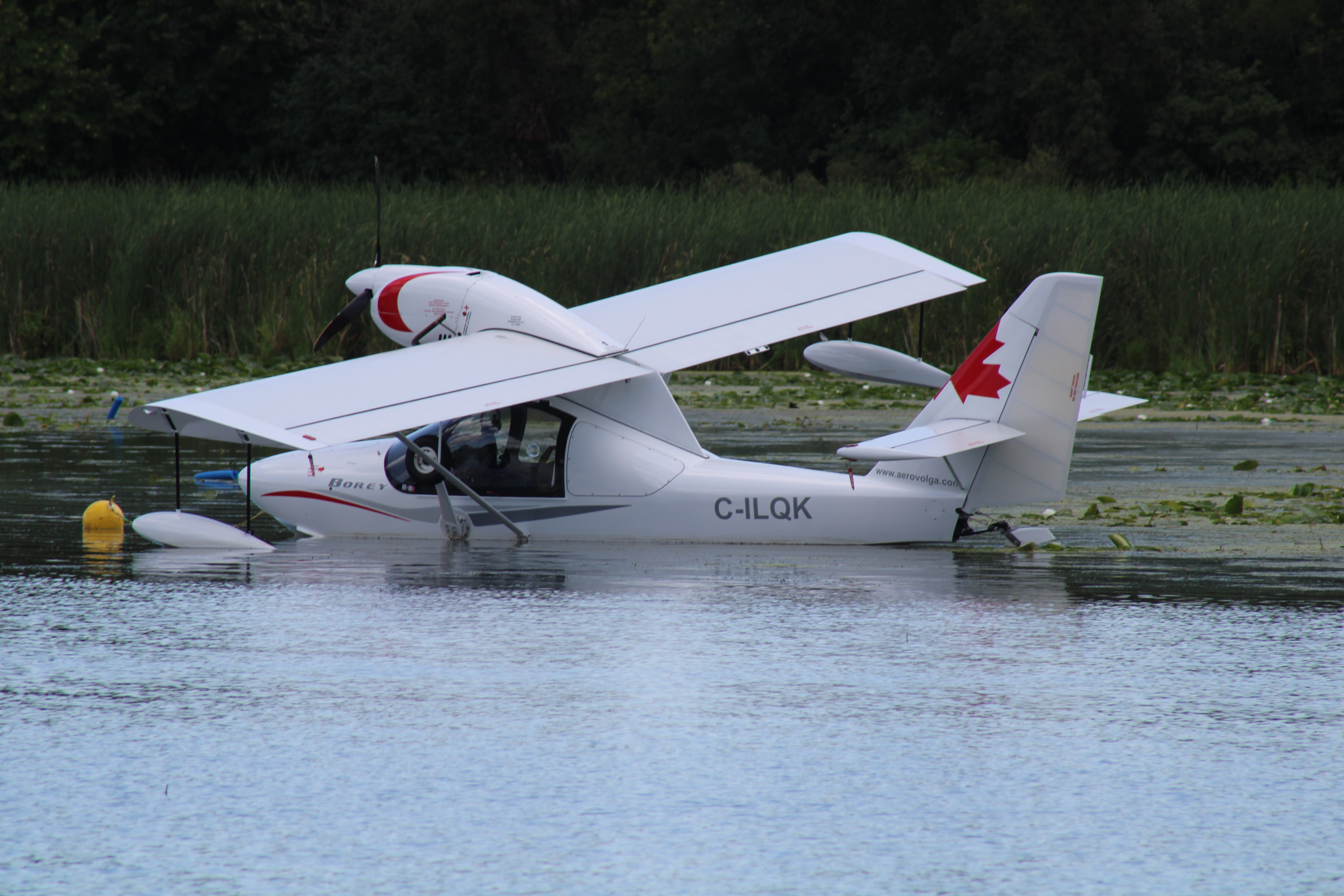
- AeroVolga Borey A at 2023 EAA AirVenture Oshkosh

General information
- Type: Amphibious ultralight aircraft
- National origin: Russia
- Manufacturer: AeroVolga
- Number built: 30 (as of 2023)

History
- First flight: 2016

The AeroVolga Borey is a single-engined amphibious aircraft built by AeroVolga in Russia.

== Design and development ==
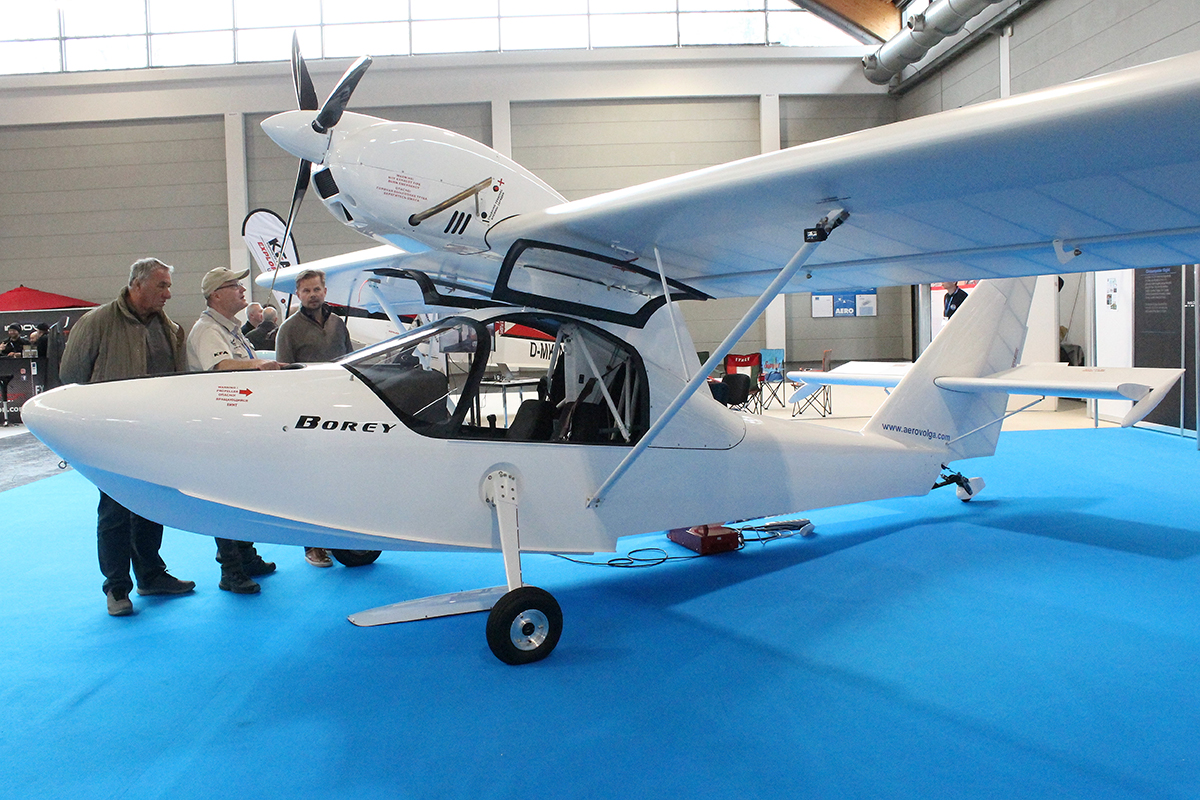
Borey at AERO Friedrichshafen 2019

Named after Boreas from Greek mythology, the Borey was the first AeroVolga aircraft to be designed using the 3D CAD software KOMPAS-3D. It is a two-seat amphibious ultralight aircraft powered by a single Rotax 912 or 914 engine. The Borey is designed for training and is equipped with instruments for night flying. The airframe is made of fiberglass and carbon fiber with fabric-covered wings and elevators. The aircraft features a flying boat hull, as well as manually retractable conventional landing gear with a steerable tailwheel for amphibious operations. The Borey can be optionally fitted with a BRS ballistic parachute.

== Operational history ==
The Borey made its first flight in 2016, with serial production beginning the following year. In 2018, a Borey L and two AeroVolga LA-8s navigated around the Arctic Circle. The trip, which lasted 43 days, traveled over 20,000 km over eight countries.

In 2019, the Borey A model received an advanced ultra-light aeroplane (AULA) letter of acceptance in Canada.

== Variants ==
Variants for the Canadian AULA market are powered by a Rotax 912UL, while variants for the American LSA and German LTF-UL markets are powered by a Rotax 912ULS.

Borey A
Advanced ultra-light aeroplane (AULA) for the Canadian market.
Borey L
Variant that participated in the circumnavigation of the Arctic Circle.

== Specifications (Borey A) ==
Data from

General characteristics

- Capacity: 2 people, 100 kilograms (220 lb) of cargo
- Length: 6.95 m (22 ft 10 in)
- Wingspan: 9.76 m (32 ft 0 in)
- Height: 2.83 m (9 ft 3 in)
- Max takeoff weight: 560 kg (1,234 lb)
- Fuel capacity: 90 litres (24 US gal)
- Powerplant: 1 × Rotax 912UL four-cylinder engine, 59.6 kW (80 hp)
- Propellers: 3-bladed

Performance

- Cruise speed: 154 km/h (96 mph, 83 kn)
- Stall speed: 67 km/h (36 mph, 31 kn)
- Never exceed speed: 198 km/h (123 mph, 107 kn)
- Range: 900 km (560 mi, 485 nmi)
- Service ceiling: 3,000 m (9,800 ft)
- Rate of climb: 4.0 m/s (787 ft/min)
- Fuel consumption: 0.1 litres per kilometre (24 mpg_{‑US})

== See also ==
Aircraft of comparable role, configuration, and era

- ATOL 650 LSA
- AirMax SeaMax
- EDRA Aeronautica Super Pétrel
- ICON A5
- LISA Akoya
- MVP Model 3
- Nordic Omsider
- Progressive Aerodyne SeaRey
- Seawind International Seawind
- Vickers Aircraft Wave
