= Icon A5 =

Amphibious light-sport aircraft developed by Icon Aircraft

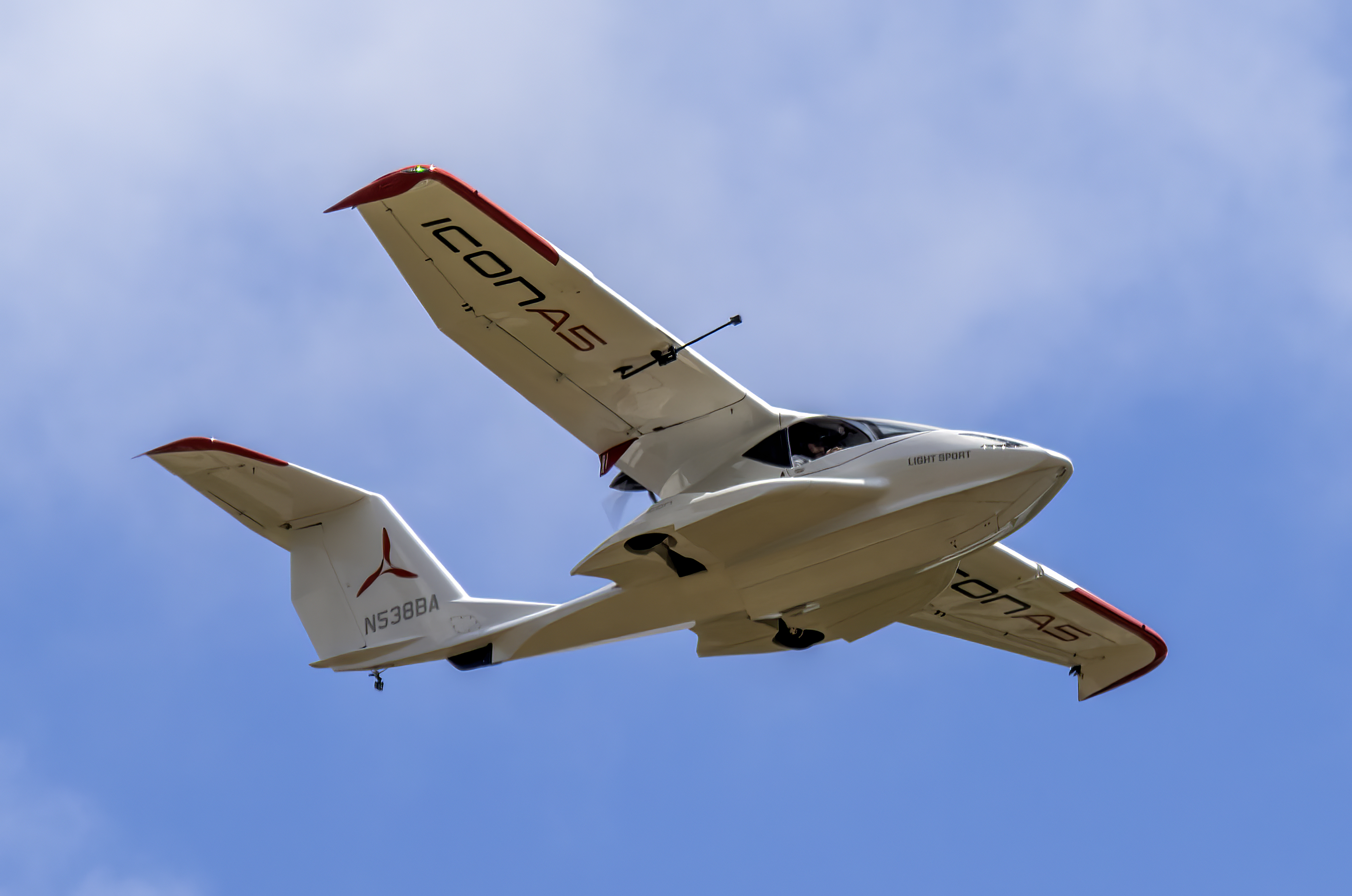
- Icon A5 in flight with gear up, 2024

General information
- Type: Amphibious light-sport aircraft
- National origin: United States
- Manufacturer: Icon Aircraft
- Status: In production
- Number built: 221 (as of December 2025)

History
- Manufactured: 2016-present
- First flight: July 9, 2008 (first prototype); July 7, 2014 (first production)

The Icon A5 is an American amphibious light-sport aircraft (LSA) designed and produced by Icon Aircraft. A concept aircraft was first flown in 2008, and creation of the production tooling began in December 2012. The first production aircraft made its first flight on July 7, 2014, and made its public debut at EAA AirVenture Oshkosh on July 27, 2014. A year later at AirVenture, it was temporarily donated to the youth group Young Eagles, with the first official A5 customer deliveries occurring in 2016. As of 2019, 100 A5s had been delivered, although company legal and financial issues have slowed production since 2016.

== Development ==
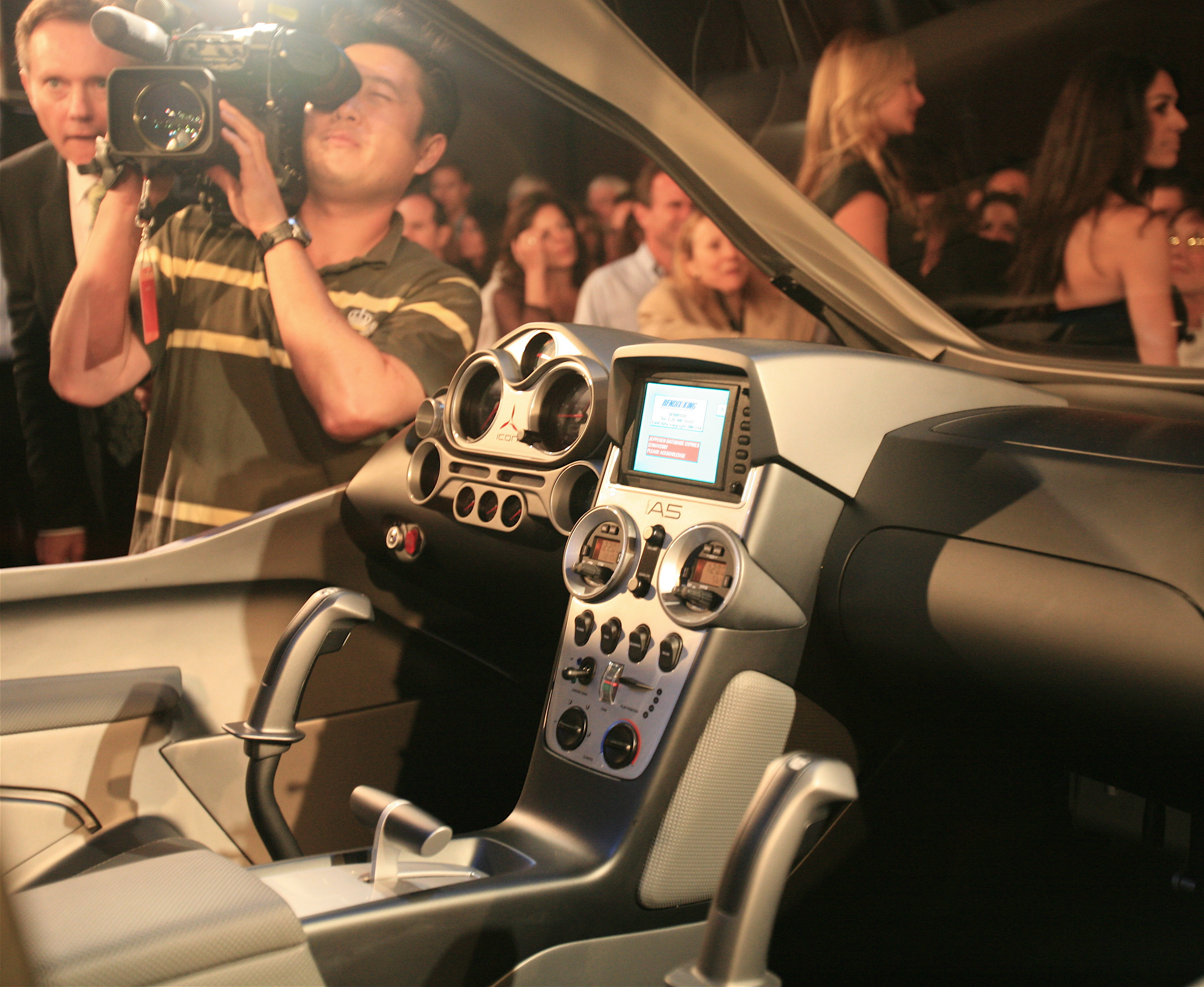
Cockpit layout in 2008, designed to resemble an automobile dashboard

Icon Aircraft positions the A5 with a recreational focus, stating that the aircraft competes with powersports vehicles such as ATVs, motorcycles, watercraft, and snowmobiles, rather than other airplanes. Icon founder and former CEO Kirk Hawkins said of the aircraft, "it's not about the usual metrics of speed, range, payload, altitude, and complex cockpits. It's about getting you out there and interacting with your world." As part of this effort, the cockpit interior was designed by BMW designers, and the exterior was designed by Nissan designer Randy Rodriguez. ICON's media debut in Wired and coverage in the mainstream media showed that there was significant interest from outside the aviation community, and ICON has reported that 35% of its customers are not pilots.

A prototype was constructed from 2007 to 2008, and made its first flight in July 2008. In January 2009, the company announced completion of the first phase (27 flights) of a three-phase testing program, including water handling. In February 2009, the prototype entered the second phase of testing to refine aerodynamic and handling qualities. In 2011, an updated "spin-resistant" wing was flight tested, and finished in February 2012. The design meets FAR Part 23 type certified requirements by employing a cuffed wing with multiple proprietary airfoils which change along the wing's span. Lotus Engineering replaced Designworks the same year to develop an "automotive style" aircraft interior and assist with the development of lightweight component manufacturing.

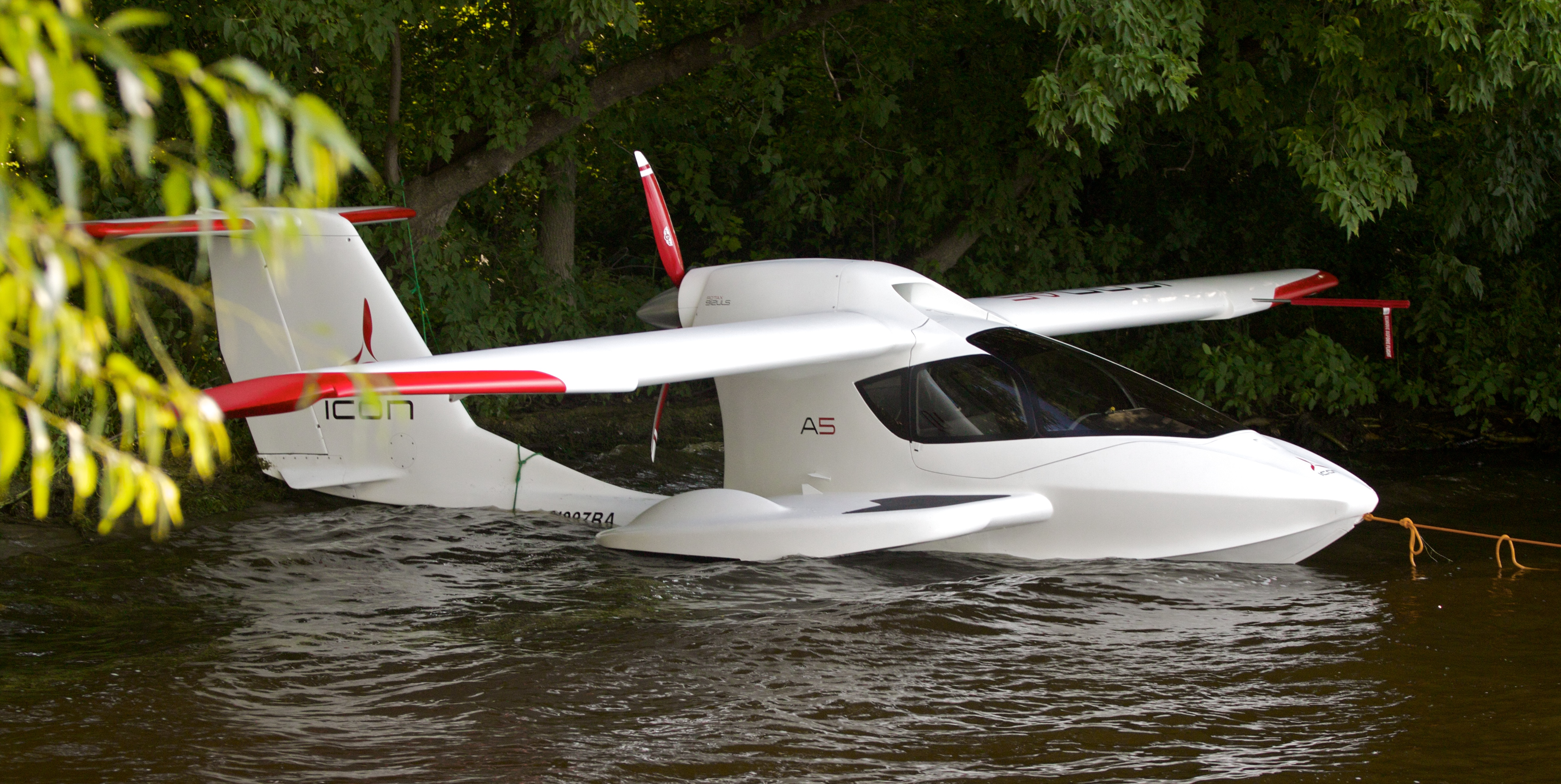
Prototype in water, 2010

In July 2012, the company applied for a Federal Aviation Administration (FAA) light-sport aircraft (LSA) rule exemption to raise the weight of the A5 above the maximum weight for amphibian LSAs (650 kg), arguing that the required structure to make the aircraft spin resistant necessitated a gross weight of 1,680 lb (762 kg). In May 2013 the FAA requested more details on the procedures used by Icon to test the spin resistance of the aircraft at the higher weight. The FAA also requested a signed statement from the company indicating that the aircraft meets the spin resistance criteria specified for light aircraft type certification in FAR 23.221 (a)(2). In July 2013 the FAA granted the weight increase.

Production delivery dates have been adjusted from initial estimates. In June 2011, the company announced that it had procured an additional US$25 million investment, which was "needed to allow the company to complete engineering development work and enter production - possibly as early as next year [2012]." By August 2011, the company stated that it had sold positions for 694 A5s, up from 400 initially sold at AirVenture 2009. A promotion in conjunction with the Experimental Aircraft Association (EAA) Young Eagles youth group raised more than US$28,000 for the youth flight program.

On August 6, 2012, Icon announced that Cirrus Aircraft would produce composite airframe components for the A5 at its Grand Forks, North Dakota, facility. The airframe parts would have been shipped to Icon's Tehachapi, California, plant for final assembly. In August 2012 the first production aircraft was anticipated for delivery in mid-2013 against 850 customer orders that the company said it was holding at that point.

In December 2012, production of the tooling master molds began, with horizontal tail fin masters being delivered to Cirrus that month. Wing skin masters were delivered in February 2013.

On June 20, 2013, the company announced that it had organized production funding of over US$60 million, with final funds being provided by a Chinese investor.

By July 30, 2013, the estimated production price had risen to US$189,000 (from the company's initial estimated price established in 2008 of US$139,000) and further raised to US$247,000 in 2015.

On October 2, 2013, the construction of production tooling was announced, which "will lead up to the assembly of the first pre-production aircraft to be completed in mid-2014."

On July 27, 2014, the first production A5 was unveiled at EAA AirVenture Oshkosh. This aircraft was constructed between January and June 2014 at company headquarters in Tehachapi, California, and first flew on July 7. Icon stated that two additional aircraft would be constructed to "verify performance and complete FAA approval". At that time the company planned to begin customer deliveries in May 2015.

The first customer aircraft was flown in May 2015, but deliveries could not commence until the company underwent an FAA audit, which was completed on June 11, 2015.

In June 2015, the company indicated that they had 1,250 orders for the A5 and plans to build 500 per year by 2017 at its new location in Vacaville, California.

On July 20, 2015, Icon presented the first production A5 as a donation to EAA youth group Young Eagles, although the aircraft was taken back to the factory on a trailer and not left with the EAA.

In August 2015, the A5 was flown by several aviation journalists, which resulted in overwhelmingly positive reviews, singling out the aircraft's handling and cockpit ergonomics.

In May 2016, the company announced that only 20 aircraft would be completed in 2016, instead of the previously planned 175 and that all these would go to training centers. Customer deliveries were announced as being delayed until 2017 at the earliest, due to the need to improve the manufacturing processes to build the aircraft design. The company also announced that, as a result of issues involving starting production, it would lay off 60 employees and terminate 90 contractors, leaving 160 employees at work. CEO Kirk Hawkins indicated that the company has the investors required to continue operations through this period, before production is increased and the company can become profitable. By May, the company reported having completed production of 7 aircraft, with 11 more partially completed.

In September 2016, the company announced that production of the composite parts would be undertaken at the company's newly established Mexico plant and not under contract by Cirrus Aircraft. These parts would then be transported to Icon's Vacaville facility for assembly. At that time the company expected to produce 30 aircraft by the end of 2017, against outstanding orders of 1,850. AVweb writer Geoff Rapoport described the company as being "plagued by production delays".

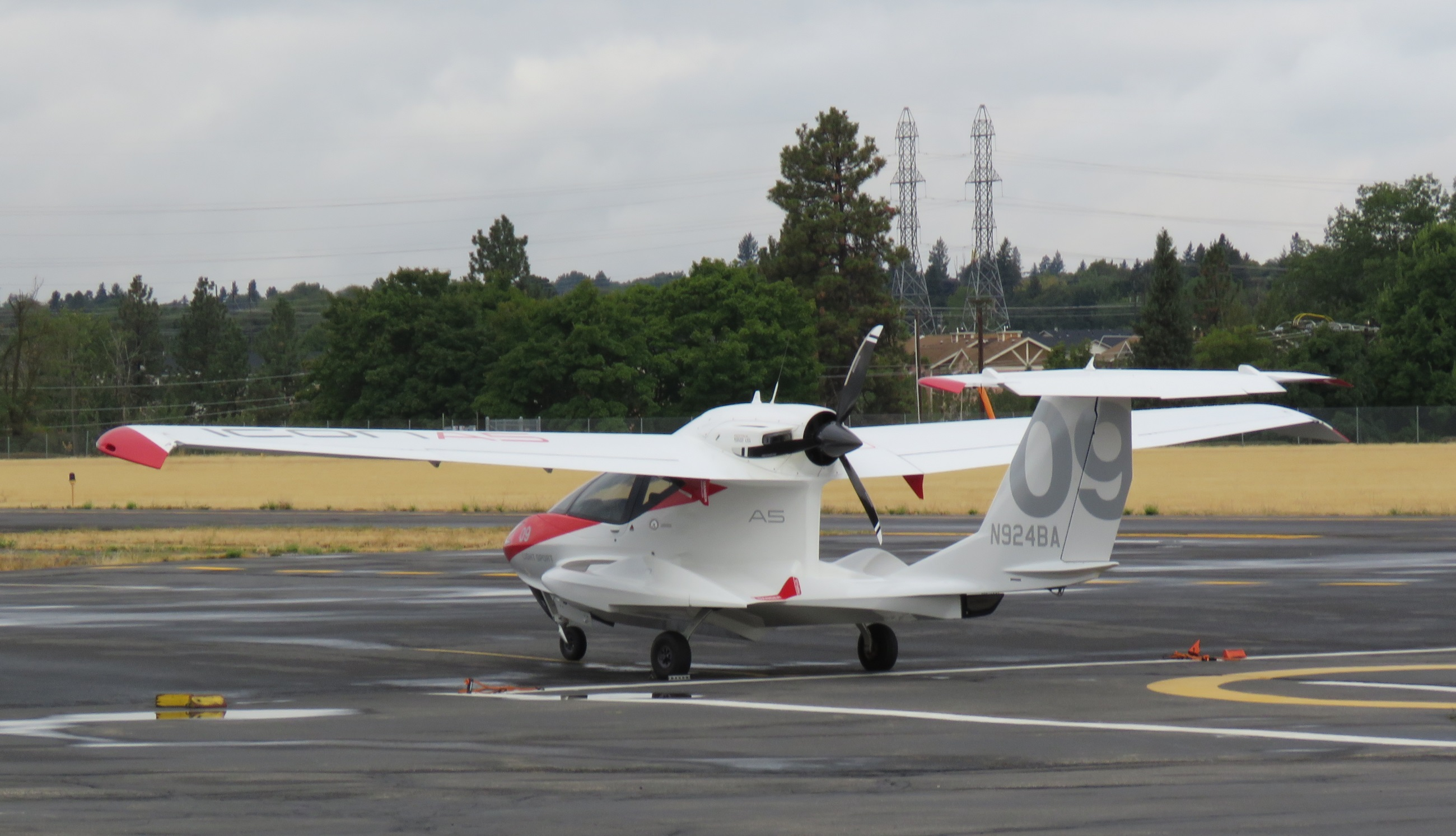
Rear view of the A5 on ramp at Felts Field in 2017

By July 2017, serial production had commenced and six aircraft delivered. The company hopes to deliver a total of 15 aircraft in 2017 and 200 in 2018.

The first Model Year 18 versions of the A5 were delivered in October 2017. This design update includes an improved nose gear design, more legible and better night illuminated instruments, a simpler and lighter oil cooler with better cooling airflow, improved rudder pedal design, improved landing-gear actuators, an improved canopy design with no airspeed limit for flight with windows removed and improved wing and fuselage access panels.

In late October 2017, the company announced a large price increase for position holders for the 2018 model year deliveries. The price for a fully equipped A5 will be US$389,000, while the base price will rise to US$269,000, although base models will not be delivered until 2019 at the earliest. The price increases amounted to a 30% increase for the base model and more than 50% for the full-equipped model. The initial estimated price in 2008 had been US$139,000, which was anticipated to have been increased between then and the start of production only by increases in the consumer price index.

As of November 7, 2017, the total number of aircraft produced was reported to be 23, including the models delivered to flight training centers.

In January 2019, the company stated that 90 aircraft had been completed and that 1,300 were on backorder. 14 had been produced in December 2018. By July 2019, 100 aircraft had been delivered.

Due to the China–United States trade war, Chinese investment in the company was cut in August 2019. This resulted in laying off 40% of the company workforce and cutting aircraft production to fewer than five aircraft per month, from a target of 20 aircraft per month.

In December 2020, the company added the Garmin G3X Touch flight display as an optional avionics upgrade.

In July 2021, the company decided to certify the aircraft in the US primary aircraft category in an attempt to increase sales outside the United States.

In January 2025, after learning from a family friend about a windshield fogging incident during takeoff in an ICON A5, a teenager named Andrew Chapin developed an innovative defrosting system. This breakthrough led to the creation of a company, Aria Systems, and a collaboration with a Cirrus aircraft owner to design additional aviation solutions.

=== Purchaser's agreement controversy ===
In April 2016, the ICON A5 purchaser's agreement was made public and was noted by the aviation media as containing many controversial elements not usually found in aircraft purchase agreements. These included contractually required pilot training, maintenance, agreements not to sue, the requirement for factory airframe overhauls every 2,000 hours or ten years (whichever comes first), and a limit on the aircraft's life of 6,000 hours, or thirty years. Furthermore, each aircraft would be equipped with a camera and recorder to monitor pilot behavior, that is owned by the manufacturer but must be maintained by the owner. Owners would have to agree to be "supportive" of the company. Future owners were required to sign the same agreement or face penalties.

The agreement was widely criticized by the aviation media, including Plane & Pilot, the Aircraft Owners and Pilots Association, AVweb and the Experimental Aircraft Association, among others. In responding to the criticism, Icon CEO Kirk Hawkins issued an open letter on April 8, 2016, that said in part, "We hear you–loud and clear. And I promise, we’re listening carefully...If we need to improve our contract to help safely grow our industry–we will."

The company refused interviews to several aviation media outlets on the subject. AVweb's Paul Bertorelli wrote, "We and other media outlets repeatedly contacted Icon for questions and clarifications, only to be either ignored, rebuffed or given summarily vague answers. At AVweb, we now have an amusing game with Icon. We schedule interviews and they cancel them. Two were cancelled last week. Hey, no fair complaining if we can't discuss any of this."

In May 2016, the company admitted that the released contract had been a mistake. Hawkins stated, "It should not have gone out in the form it went out without an explanation. [Customers] had a right to be taken aback." The company issued a revised contract that removed many, but not all controversial elements. Removed were the audio and video cockpit recorder, the "responsible flyer" clause, limiting the owner's cost of the mandatory airframe overhaul to $15,000, and removing the 30-year life limit. Retained were the agreement not to sue, the requirement for company-approved training, and the requirement that the agreement bind future owners.

== Design ==
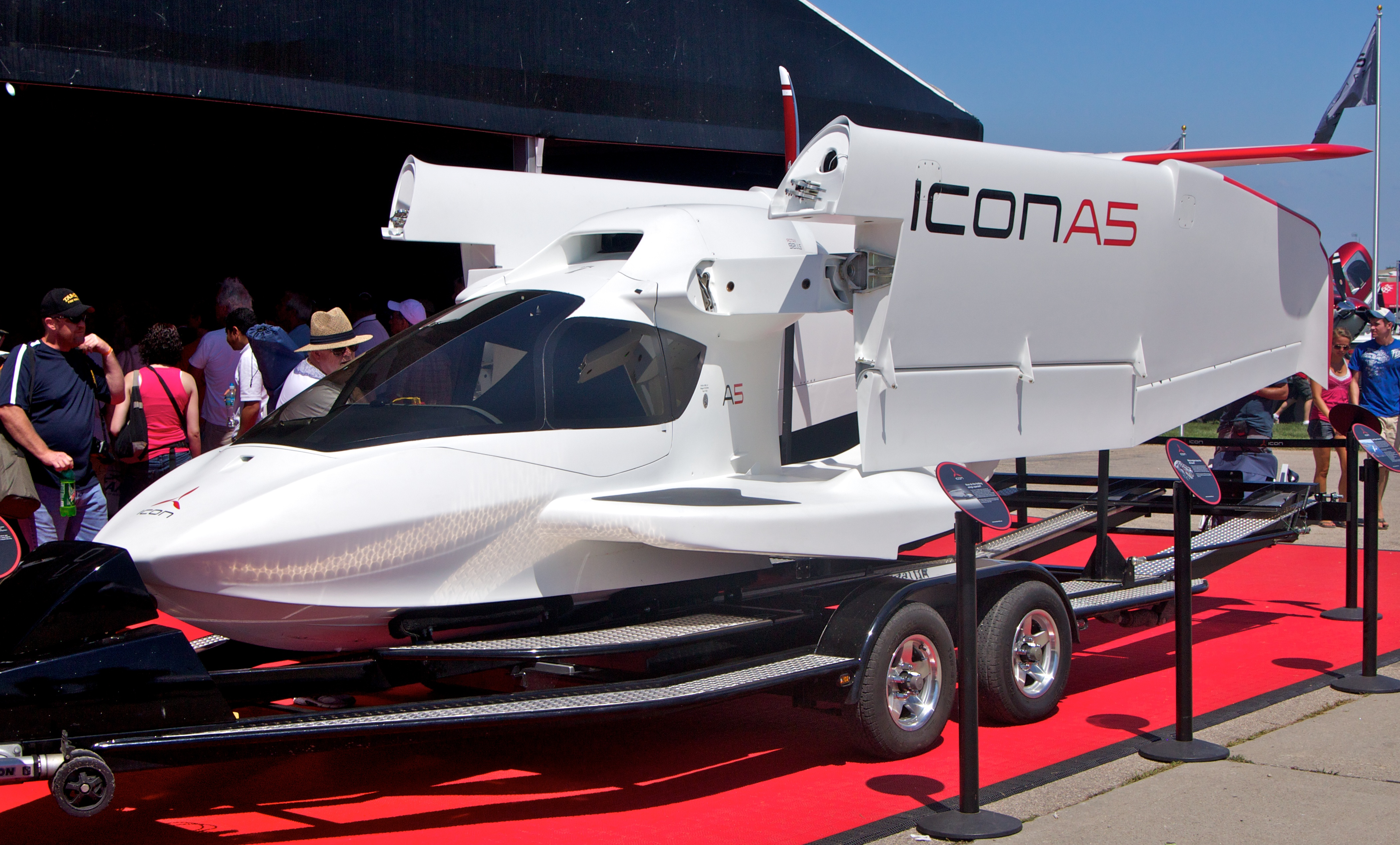
ICON A5 displayed at AirVenture with its wings folded for transport

The A5 is a high-wing flying boat-type amphibious monoplane with a carbon fiber airframe and retractable undercarriage. It seats two people in an enclosed 46-inch-wide (116.8 cm) cockpit and is powered by a single 100 hp (75 kW) Rotax 912 iS engine driving a three-bladed pusher propeller. Dornier-style sponsons provide hydrodynamic stability, house the retracted main landing gear, and act as a step for crew and passenger. The wings can be folded aft for ground transport and storage. The factory installed equipment includes an angle of attack indicator as a safety enhancement for stall awareness, a feature not usually found in general aviation aircraft. A whole-airframe Ballistic Recovery Systems (BRS) parachute is optional, except for in U.S.-registered A5s where it is mandatory, due to ICON's exemption from the U.S. light-sport aircraft (LSA) weight limit. The A5 uses many different design elements to provide a manageable stall recovery.

== Operational history ==
In a September 2017 review following a complete conversion course, AVweb writer Geoff Rapoport said of the aircraft:

If you really put the hammer down, the A5 can get up to about 90 knots. It is not meant to go far, fast or carry much load. If that's what you need, Icon will happily give you the number for your local Cirrus dealer—or Southwest Airlines. The A5 was designed for fun—and to qualify as a light-sport aircraft, which it barely did by getting a waiver to increase its maximum takeoff weight. There are other new airplanes designed principally for fun, mostly other light sports, but in comparison to the A5, they sometimes feel like really nice kitplanes.

=== Deliveries ===
2016	2017	2018	2019	2020	2021	2022	2023	2024	2025	Total
5	10	44	41	22	18	36	33	9	3	221

=== Awards ===
- 2008 Popular Science 100 Best Innovations of the Year
- 2009 I.D. Annual Design Review
- 2009 International Design Excellence Awards Gold in Automotive & Transportation
- 2009 International Design Excellence Awards People's Choice Award
- 2009 Gold Spark Design Award
- 2010 Wallpaper "Life-enhancer of the Year" Judges Award
- 2010 Red Dot Product Design Winner
- 2015 Flying Editors' Choice Award

== Accidents and incidents ==
- On April 1, 2017, a factory-owned A5 suffered a "heavy landing" on water near Biscayne National Park, Florida, which resulted in the sinking of the aircraft. Both the pilot and passenger were uninjured, but the aircraft took on water and submerged to its wings before being towed 8 miles (13 km) to a marina. This was the first official A5 accident. According to the NTSB report, the incident was caused by pilot error.
- On May 8, 2017, a factory-owned A5 crashed on the shore of Lake Berryessa in Napa County, California, near the company's training facility. Two Icon employees were killed in the accident: lead engineer and chief company test pilot Jon Karkow, who was the pilot in command, and Cagri Sever, Icon's director of engineering, who was a passenger on the flight. Karkow had been involved in the design of the A5's folding wings as well as parts of the aircraft's control systems. Just prior to the crash the aircraft was witnessed maneuvering at very low altitude and entering a narrow canyon, when, at high power, it pitched up and rolled to the left, impacting terrain. The National Transportation Safety Board (NTSB) determined that the cause was "the pilot's failure to maintain clearance from terrain while maneuvering at a low altitude." The board found no fault with the aircraft.
- On November 7, 2017, retired Major League Baseball pitcher Roy Halladay was killed when his A5 crashed into the Gulf of Mexico off the coast of Pasco County, Florida. Witness reports and NTSB data obtained from the aircraft's flight recorder indicate that he was engaged in low flying at the time of the impact. Halladay had taken delivery of his new A5 on October 12, 2017. His was the first of the Model Year 18 aircraft to have been delivered. On January 19, 2018, an autopsy revealed that Halladay had traces of morphine, amphetamine, and Ambien in his body system at the time of his death. The NTSB determined the probable cause to be the "pilot's improper decision to perform aggressive, low-altitude maneuvers due to his impairment from the use of multiple psychoactive substances, which resulted in a loss of control."
- On July 30, 2019, Flying published an article regarding a takeoff accident in Littlefield Township, Michigan that injured the two occupants, noting "This is the fifth accident or incident of an A5 in 2019."

== Specifications (estimated) ==
Data from Icon Aircraft

General characteristics

- Crew: one
- Capacity: one passenger
- Length: 23 ft (7.0 m)
- Wingspan: 34.8 ft (10.6 m)
- Height: 8.1 ft (2.5 m)
- Empty weight: 1,080 lb (490 kg)
- Gross weight: 1,510 lb (685 kg)
- Fuel capacity: 20 US gal (76 L)
- Powerplant: 1 × Rotax 912 iS fuel-injected, air and liquid cooled four cylinder aircraft engine, 100 hp (75 kW)
- Propellers: 3-bladed composite

Performance

- Maximum speed: 95 kn (109 mph, 176 km/h)
- Range: 427 nmi (491 mi, 791 km)
- Maximum glide ratio: 9:1

Avionics

- Portable GPS with an integrated panel mount
- VHF Communication Radio
- Modes A, C & S and ADS-B Transponder
- Garmin G3X Touch flight display (option)

== See also ==
Aircraft of comparable role, configuration, and era

- AeroVolga Borey
- ATOL 650 LSA
- AirMax SeaMax
- EDRA Aeronautica Super Pétrel
- LISA Akoya
- MVP Model 3
- Nordic Omsider
- Progressive Aerodyne SeaRey
- Seawind International Seawind
- Vickers Aircraft Wave

Related lists

- List of flying boats and floatplanes
