= Seamax M-22 =

Brazilian light-sport flying boat

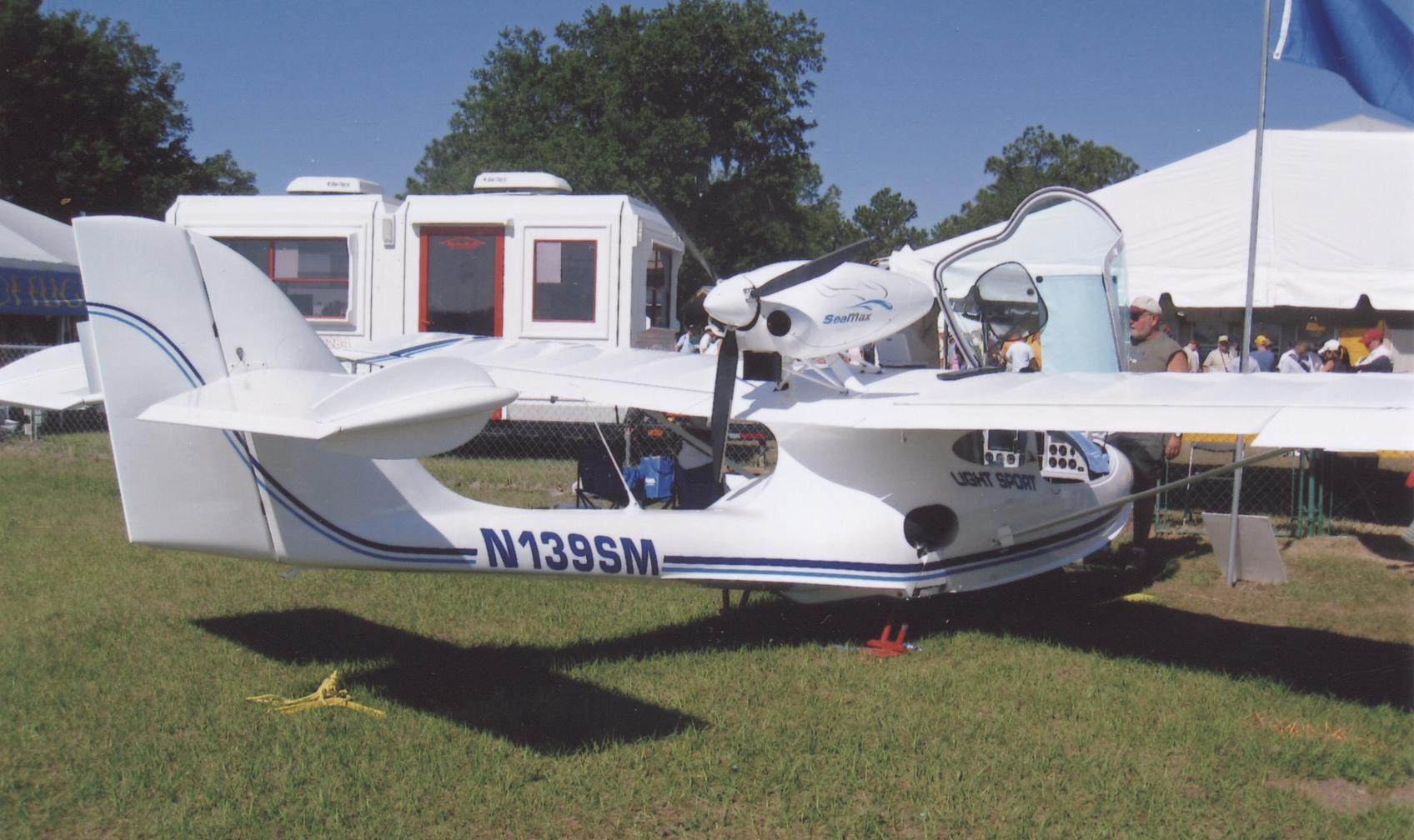
- Seamax M-22

General information
- Type: Amphibious light-sport aircraft and FAI microlight
- National origin: Brazil
- Manufacturer: Airmax Construções Aeronáuticas; Seamax Aircraft
- Designer: Miguel Rosario
- Status: In production
- Number built: 160 (2018)

History
- First flight: 2000

The Seamax M-22 is a Brazilian single-engine, amphibious light sport aircraft (LSA) and Fédération Aéronautique Internationale microlight. Originally manufactured by AirMax Construções Aeronáuticas of Jacarepaguá and called the Airmax SeaMax, since 2015 it has been built by Seamax Aircraft of São Paulo.

== Design and development ==
The Seamax M-22 was designed in 1999. A prototype was flown in 2000 and the first production aircraft left the factory in 2001. The Seamax M-22 is constructed using composite materials and metal components. It has a two-seat, side-by-side configuration cabin with a bubble canopy which is hydraulically raised for access. The high-wing is strut-braced and the tail is a cruciform tail. The aircraft's tricycle landing gear is retractable for landing on water. It is powered by a 100 hp (75 kW) Rotax 912ULS pusher configuration engine mounted above the wing to avoid water ingestion.

Versions can be constructed to meet the requirements of both the European microlight and US LSA categories. A version with folding wings is available as the M-22 FW.

A total of 160 had been built by 2018.

== Operational history ==
In October 13, 2025, one of the Seamax M-22 units, registered under PU-DNA call sign at National Civil Aviation Agency of Brazil suffered an accident (crash) in Setor Santos Dumont, in the brazilian Goiânia city. The pilot survived with bruises and there were no fatalities.

== Specifications ==
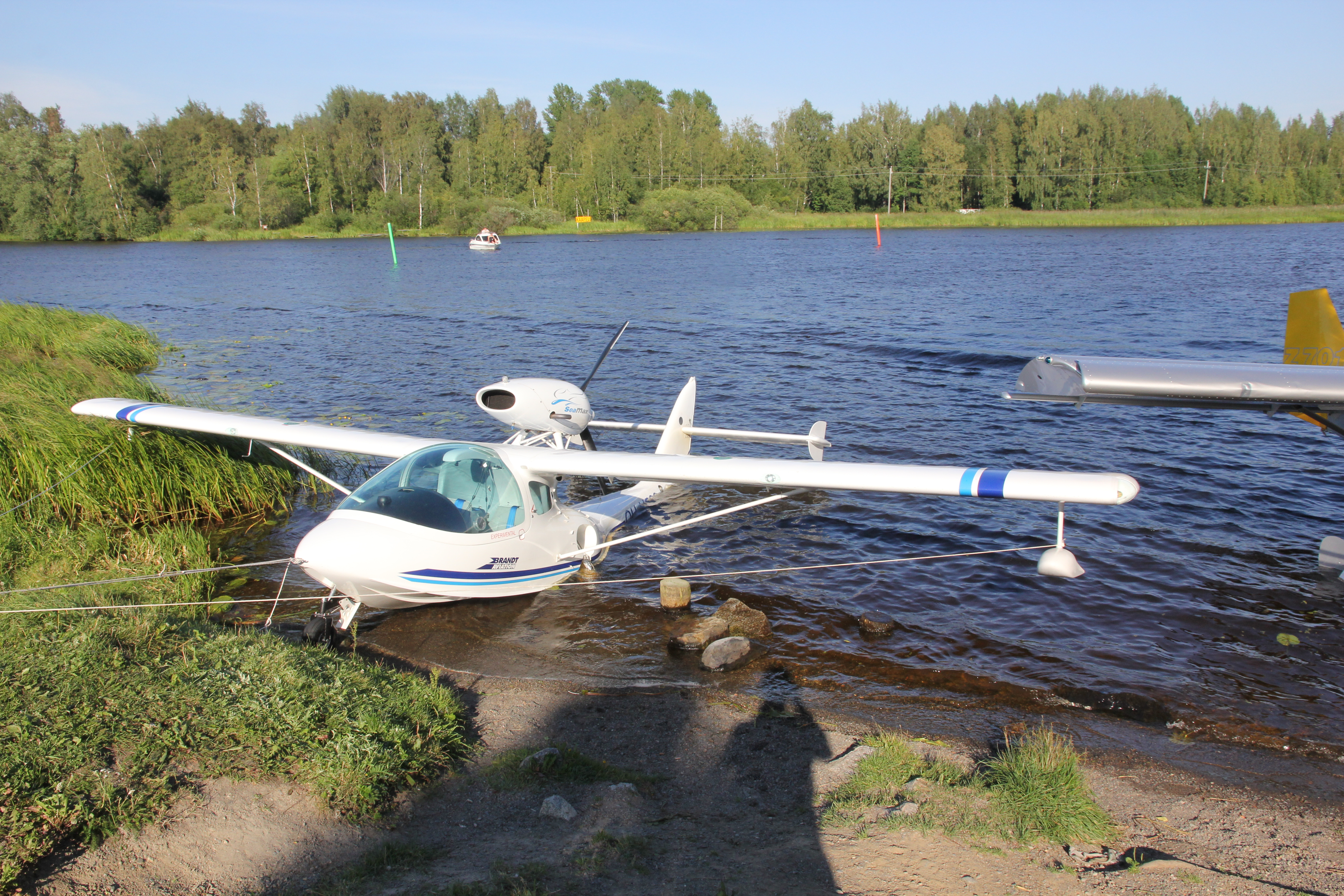
SeaMax in Linnasalmi, Hämeenlinna

Data from Bayerl

General characteristics

- Crew: one
- Capacity: one passenger
- Wingspan: 8.75 m (28 ft 8 in)
- Wing area: 12.24 m^{2} (131.8 sq ft)
- Empty weight: 300 kg (661 lb)
- Gross weight: 520 kg (1,146 lb)
- Fuel capacity: 96 litres (21 imp gal; 25 US gal)
- Powerplant: 1 × Rotax 912ULS four cylinder, liquid and air-cooled, four stroke, 75 kW (101 hp)

Performance

- Maximum speed: 210 km/h (130 mph, 110 kn)
- Cruise speed: 195 km/h (121 mph, 105 kn)
- Stall speed: 58 km/h (36 mph, 31 kn)
- Rate of climb: 5 m/s (980 ft/min)

== See also ==
Aircraft of comparable role, configuration, and era

- AeroVolga Borey
- EDRA Aeronautica Super Pétrel
- Icon A5
- LISA Akoya
- MVP Model 3
- Nordic Omsider
- Progressive Aerodyne SeaRey
- Seawind International Seawind

Related lists

- List of flying boats and floatplanes
