= Lisa Akoya =

French amphibious light aeroplane

Akoya
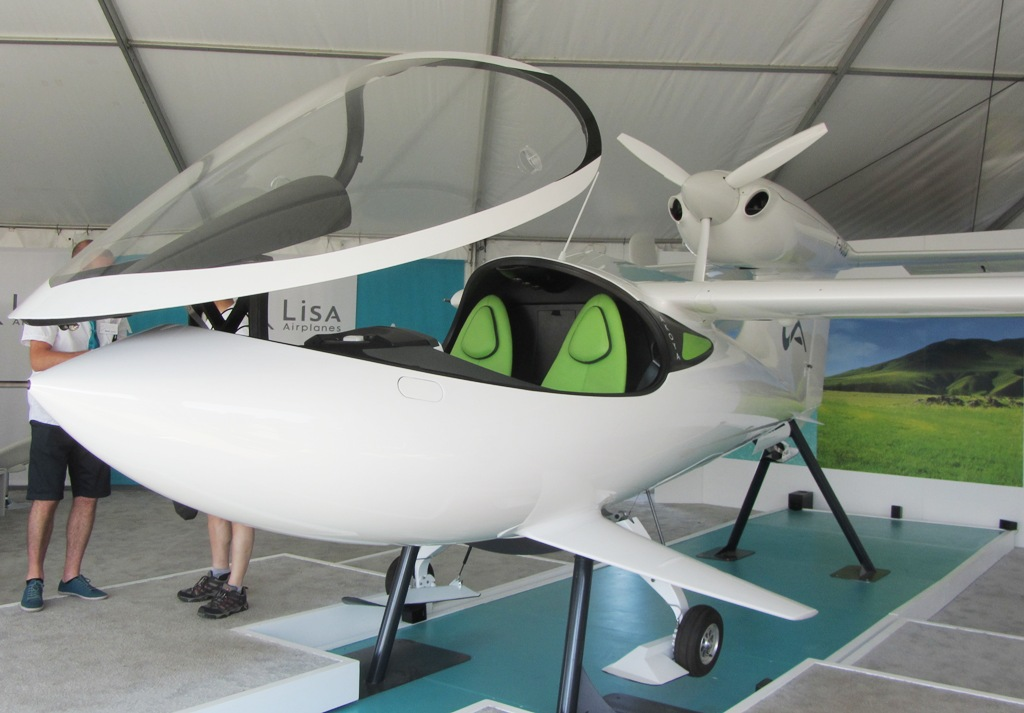

General information
- Type: Two seat Amphibious aircraft
- National origin: France
- Manufacturer: LISA Airplanes

History
- First flight: 22 August 2007

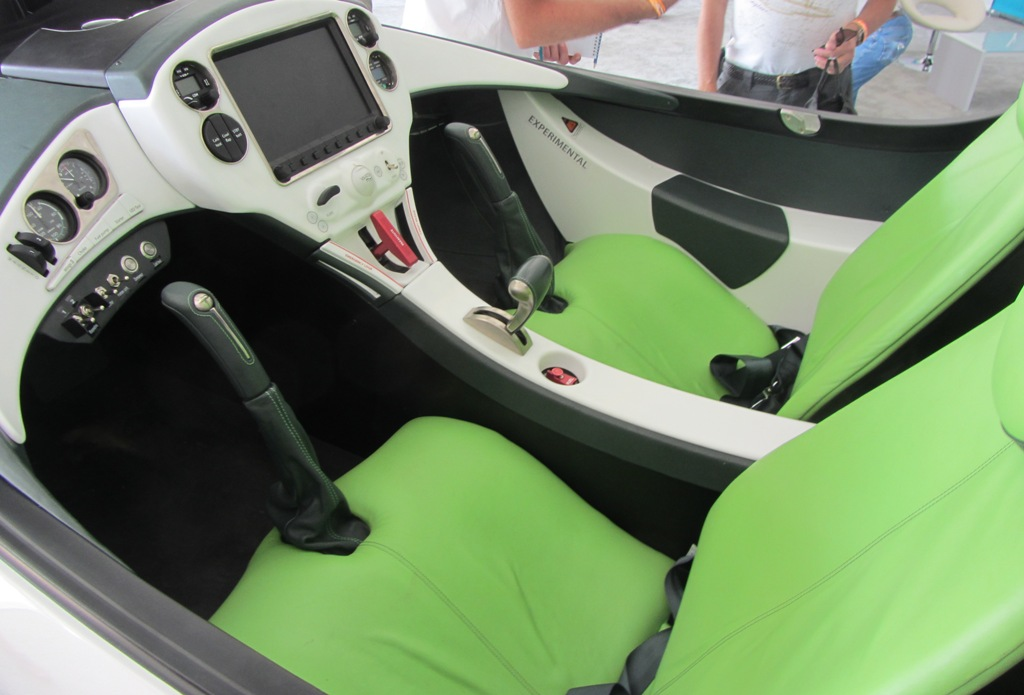
Instrument panel

The LISA Akoya is a French single-engine light aircraft, seating two in side-by-side configuration. It is an amphibious aircraft capable of landing on land, water or snow without adaptation. It has a high-aspect-ratio electrically-folding wing, with trailing edge extensions rather than flaps, and a rear-mounted tractor configuration engine.

== Design and development ==
The LISA Akoya (Akoya is a species of pearl oyster) is an innovative light aircraft designed to operate from land, water or snow without adaptation and incorporating a wing of variable area. Some other features are also unusual: it has a wing which folds for transportation by horizontal rotation through almost 90° and a single engine mounted high on the fin in tractor configuration. It is built entirely from carbon-fiber-reinforced polymer composites.

The cantilever wings of the Akoya have an aspect ratio of about 18:1, very high for a powered aircraft. They have constant chord apart from the angled tips. Instead of conventional hinged flaps, the inner 2/3 of the trailing edge can be extended rearwards, exposing new fabric surface stored within the wing in roller blind fashion. Fully extended for landing and half extended for take-off, these surfaces provide a large increase in wing area. Conventional ailerons are fitted outboard. High mounted, the wings attach at a rotatable fairing on the highest point of the fuselage, allowing the rotation for storage.

The fin and rudder together form a swept, short and parallel chord surface which carries at its top both the tailplane in T-tail configuration and the engine. The tailplane, like the wing, is of high aspect ratio and has full span elevators. The engine is a 73.5 kW (98.6 hp) Rotax 912 ULS flat four, driving a three bladed tractor propeller.

The Akoya's fuselage is pointed at the nose and almost circular at its greatest diameter. In elevation it has a curved underside and, above, the large one piece canopy over the side-by-side, dual control cabin forms an unbroken line with the fuselage. There is an electrically operated retractable undercarriage of the taildragger variety, with the main gear legs rotating backward and inwards into the fuselage, and the tailwheel arm rotating forward. All wheels have hydraulic brakes. Operation from water, without a planing bottom or floats, is performed undercarriage up on the round fuselage underside with the aid of a pair of fixed hydrofoils, called shark-fins, sharply tapered planes set at about 50° to the vertical just outboard of the mainwheels. Small tip floats are an option for better lateral stability on water. The Akoya, it is claimed by the manufacturer, can also land on snow, though skis are an option.

A full-size mock-up appeared at the Friedrichshafen Aero '07 show in April 2007, and the prototype flew in August 2007 at Chambery. By May 2009 F-WURE had flown 150 hours and 50 orders placed. Production was initially expected by mid-2011.

In March 2012 the company was pursuing light-sport aircraft approval of the design to facilitate sales in the United States.

In July 2012 the prototype had flown its first passenger and has been exhibited at AirVenture 2012. LSA approval and the start of production was still pending. Also in July 2012, the company was placed in receivership for financial restructuring after existing investors were not forthcoming with additional funds.

By February 2013 a 75% controlling interest in the company had been purchased by the Heima Mining Company of China for US$20 million. The Heima Mining Company will name its own chairman of LISA and plans to open two new production lines in France. The Chinese investment permitted finalizing the Akoya's design for production.

In late 2014 the aircraft was priced "all inclusive" at 300,000 Euros. In July 2015 information about the aircraft was shown at AirVenture, and the price was indicated as US$330,000, and the company claimed about 100 orders.

In March 2017 it was announced that an updated second-prototype would fly in April 2017, it included a new retractable landing gear that would enable the aircraft to operate on water, land and snow.

The second prototype, Pre-Series 1, first flew in August 2017 and features revised fuselage fins, that are horizontal, instead of canted downwards. This change enabled shortening the main landing gear legs to improve cockpit visibility when taxiing.

== Specifications (Akoya) ==
Data from Jane's All the World's Aircraft 2011/12

General characteristics

- Capacity: 2
- Length: 6.90 m (22 ft 8 in)
- Wingspan: 11.00 m (36 ft 1 in)
- Height: 2.35 m (7 ft 9 in) including propeller
- Wing area: 6.70 m^{2} (72.1 sq ft)
- Empty weight: 400 kg (882 lb)
- Max takeoff weight: 650 kg (1,433 lb)
- Fuel capacity: 70 L (18 US gal; 15 imp gal) with optional additional 110 L (29 US gal; 24 imp gal) tank
- Powerplant: 1 × Rotax 912 ULS flat four cylinder piston with 1:2.34 reduction gear, 73.5 kW (98.6 hp)
- Propellers: 3-bladed

Performance

- Cruise speed: 210 km/h (130 mph, 110 kn) economical
- Stall speed: 64 km/h (40 mph, 35 kn) flaps down
- Never exceed speed: 290 km/h (180 mph, 160 kn)
- Range: 1,250 km (780 mi, 670 nmi) at economical cruising speed without optional tank
- Rate of climb: 5.2 m/s (1,020 ft/min) maximum

Avionics

- VHF, intercom, transponder. Two screen EFIS with emergency backup instruments.

== See also ==
Aircraft of comparable role, configuration, and era

- AeroVolga Borey
- AirMax SeaMax
- EDRA Aeronautica Super Pétrel
- Icon A5
- MVP Model 3
- Nordic Omsider
- Progressive Aerodyne SeaRey
- Seawind International Seawind
- Vickers Aircraft Wave
