= Nordic Omsider =

Norwegian amphibious aircraft

Omsider

General information
- Type: Flying boat
- National origin: Norway
- Manufacturer: Nordic Aircraft
- Designer: Terje Sandvik, Jostein Eide
- Status: Under development (2015)
- Number built: two prototypes

History
- Introduction date: 2014

The Nordic Omsider (English: at last or finally) is a Norwegian amphibious flying boat, designed by Terje Sandvik and Jostein Eide and under development by Nordic Aircraft AS of Kinsarvik. It was introduced at the AERO Friedrichshafen show in 2014. Once in production the aircraft is intended to be supplied complete and ready-to-fly.

== Design and development ==
The Omsider was developed to provide an amphibious aircraft suited to Norwegian conditions. Conceived in the 1980s, development was started in 1999 and 20,000 person-hours and €600,000 have been invested in building the molds and the prototypes.

The design features a cantilever high-wing, with a stub lower wing/float, an enclosed cockpit, with two-seats-in-tandem under a forward-hinged bubble canopy, a T-tail, retractable tricycle landing gear and a single engine in pusher configuration.

The aircraft is made from composite material. Its 9.1 m (29.9 ft) span wing mounts flaps. Standard engines available are the 100 hp (75 kW) Rotax 912ULS and Rotax 912iS four-stroke powerplants.

The initial prototype was built in Norway and has logged over 500 flying hours. It features outrigger floats. The second prototype was built under contract by ATEC v.o.s. in the Czech Republic. The wings and part of the tail are from the ATEC 321 Faeta and the second prototype features stub wings/floats.

== Specifications (Omsider) ==
Data from Tacke and manufacturer

General characteristics

- Crew: one
- Capacity: one passenger
- Length: 6.9 m (22 ft 8 in)
- Wingspan: 9.1 m (29 ft 10 in)
- Empty weight: 320 kg (705 lb)
- Gross weight: 495 kg (1,091 lb)
- Fuel capacity: 80 litres (18 imp gal; 21 US gal)
- Powerplant: 1 × Rotax 912ULS four cylinder, liquid and air-cooled, four stroke aircraft engine, 75 kW (101 hp)
- Propellers: 3-bladed composite

Performance

- Cruise speed: 210 km/h (130 mph, 110 kn)
- Stall speed: 64 km/h (40 mph, 35 kn)
- Never exceed speed: 254 km/h (158 mph, 137 kn)
- Range: 900 km (560 mi, 490 nmi)
- Rate of climb: 6.0 m/s (1,181 ft/min)

== See also ==
Aircraft of comparable role, configuration, and era

- AeroVolga Borey
- AirMax SeaMax
- Icon A5
- LISA Akoya
- MVP Model 3
- Progressive Aerodyne SeaRey
- Seawind International Seawind
- Vickers Aircraft Wave

Related lists

- List of flying boats and floatplanes
