= Scoda Aeronáutica =

Airplane manufacturer in Brazil

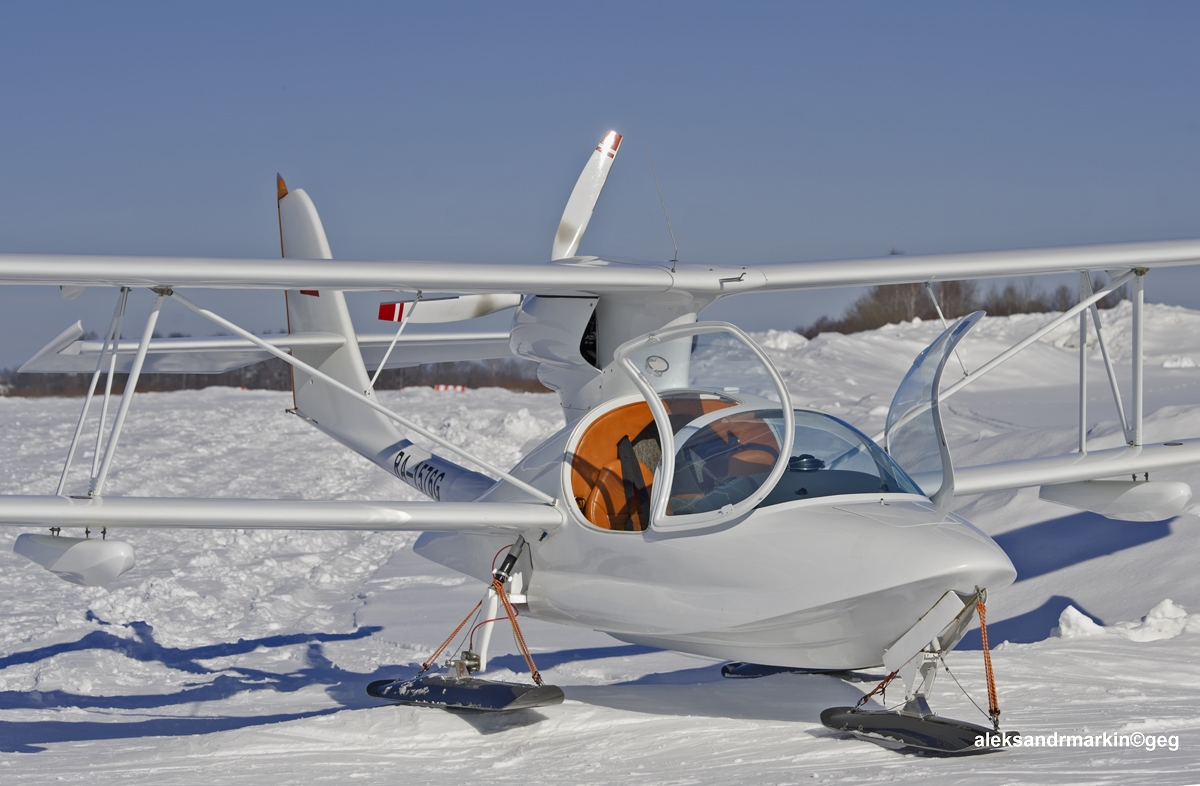
- Super Petrel
- Company type: Private
- Industry: Aerospace
- Predecessor: EDRA Aeronáutica
- Founded: 1997; 29 years ago
- Founder: Rodrigo Scoda
- Headquarters: Ipeúna, São Paulo, Brazil
- Products: Airplanes
- Subsidiaries: Super Petrel USA
- Website: www.scodaeronautica.com.br

Scoda Aeronáutica is a Brazilian aircraft manufacturer founded in 1997 and based at Ipeúna, São Paulo.

== Aircraft ==
Summary of aircraft built by Scoda Aeronáutica
Model name	First flight	Number built	Type
Super Petrel	2002	420	Amphibious aircraft
