= Vickers Aircraft Wave =

Amphibious aircraft

Wave

General information
- Type: Light-sport Aircraft
- National origin: New Zealand
- Manufacturer: Vickers Aircraft Company
- Status: In development

History
- First flight: 12 March 2022

The Vickers Aircraft Company Wave is a two-seat amphibious aircraft, under development by the Vickers Aircraft Company of Hamilton, New Zealand. It was introduced at the Sport Aviation Expo in Sebring, Florida in 2014.

== Design and development ==
The Wave is a two-seat, side-by-side configuration, high wing amphibious aircraft, intended for the US light-sport aircraft category. The fuselage and wings are constructed from a combination of aluminum and carbon fibre composite materials. An automatic folding wing mechanism and ballistic parachute are planned to be integrated.

Paul Vickers, CEO of Vickers Aircraft Company Ltd, has indicated that the company's approach to the development of the Wave has been intentionally non-traditional, and involves simultaneous product and manufacturing development.

In September 2015, the powerplant selected for the Wave was the 180 hp (134 kW) Continental Titan 340 four-stroke engine, mounted in a pusher configuration. In late 2019, Vickers announced a switch to the 141 hp (105 kW) Rotax 915iS four-stroke turbocharged engine, in the same configuration.

In April 2020, eleven years after initiation of development of the aircraft, Paul Vickers wrote that "The WAVE will be ready soon, but not before it is. It has taken the time that has been necessary to design and produce a truly incredible aircraft." The prototype first flew on 12 March 2022.

== Specifications (Wave) ==
Data from Vickers Aircraft Co Ltd

General characteristics

- Crew: 1
- Capacity: 2
- Length: 24 ft 7 in (7.5 m)
- Wingspan: 30 ft 10 in (9.40 m)
- Height: 7 ft 6 in (2.29 m)
- Wing area: 149.3 sq ft (13.87 m^{2})
- Empty weight: 928 lb (421 kg) useful load 650 lbs
- Gross weight: 1,850 lb (839 kg)
- Fuel capacity: 60 U.S. gallons (230 L; 50 imp gal)
- Powerplant: 1 × Rotax 915iS horizontally opposed turbocharged piston aircraft engine, 141 hp (105 kW)

Performance

- Cruise speed: 120 kn (140 mph, 220 km/h)
- Range: 1,100 nmi (1,300 mi, 2,000 km) No Reserve
- Wing loading: 12.33 lb/sq ft (60.2 kg/m^{2})

== See also ==
Aircraft of comparable role, configuration, and era

- AeroVolga Borey
- AirMax SeaMax
- Icon A5
- LISA Akoya
- MVP Model 3
- Nordic Omsider
- Progressive Aerodyne SeaRey
