= Progressive Aerodyne SeaRey =

American amphibious aircraft

SeaRey
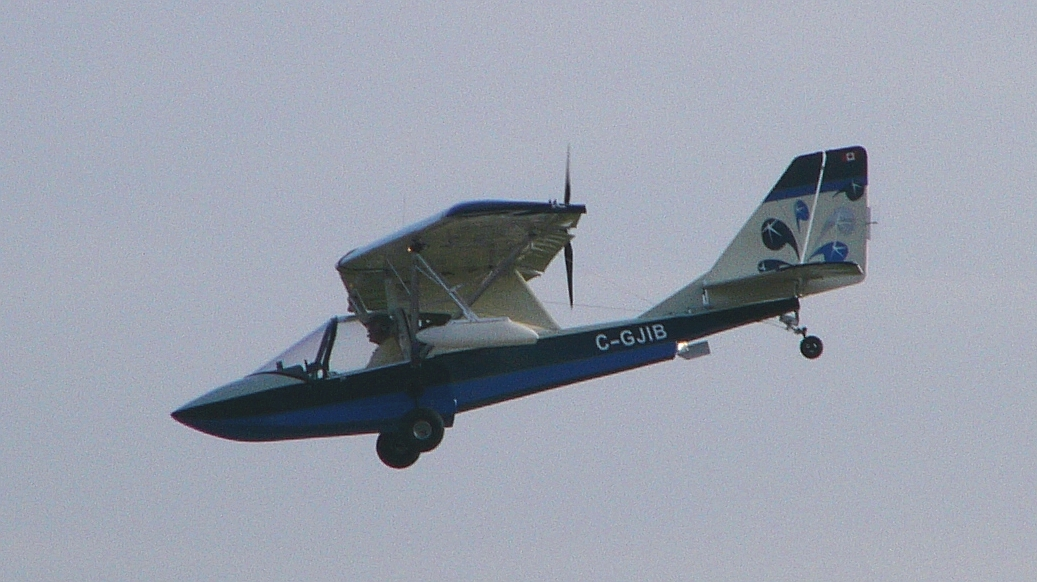

General information
- Type: Kit aircraft
- National origin: United States
- Manufacturer: Progressive Aerodyne
- Status: In service
- Number built: 480 (2011)

History
- Manufactured: 1992–2023
- Introduction date: 1992
- First flight: 13 November 1992

The Progressive Aerodyne SeaRey is an American two-seat, single-engine, amphibious flying boat designed and manufactured by Progressive Aerodyne originally in Orlando, Florida, and now in Tavares, Florida. It was first flown in November 1992 and is sold as a kit aircraft for amateur construction as well as a light-sport aircraft.

== Development ==
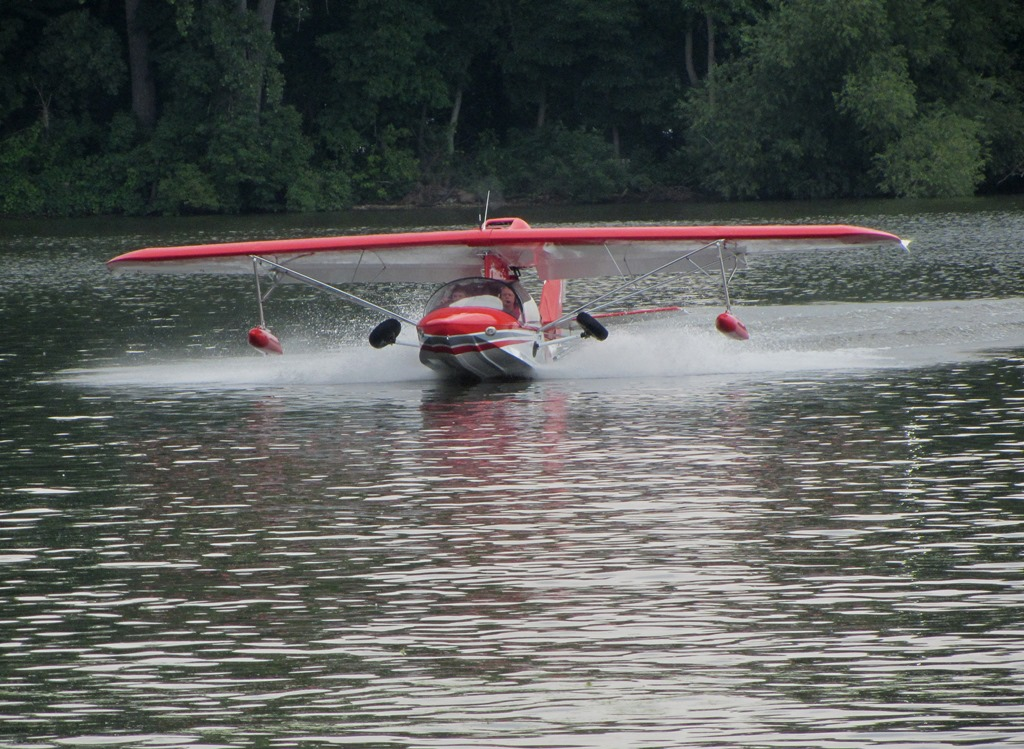
SeaRey Landing

Development of the aircraft that became the SeaRey began in the 1970s with the introduction of the Advanced Aviation Hi-Nuski ultralight. In the early 1980s Stanley Richter, his son Wayne Richter, Wayne's wife Nina Richter and Wayne's son Kerry Richter established Advanced Aviation where they designed and manufactured a number of different designs. The company produced the Buccaneer XA and two seat Buccaneer II flying boats for Highcraft AeroMarine, and designed the improved Buccaneer SX. The company was sold in 1992.

In June 1992, Wayne and Kerry Richter, along with Advanced Aviation employee Paige Lynette, formed a new company, Progressive Aerodyne, where they designed the first SeaRey prototype. The SeaRey had its inaugural flight on 13 November 1992. The performance, including a speed of up to 105 mph (169 km/h) surpassed the design goals.

Between its introduction in 1992 and 2006 over 400 SeaRey kits were delivered to customers.

The latest variant of the Searey is the LSA (also available as LSX) for the US light-sport aircraft category, introduced in 2010.

=== Category eligibility ===
In the United States the SeaRey may be registered either as a light sport aircraft or as an amateur-built experimental.

The Canadian Aviation Regulations allow the SeaRey to be registered either as an amateur built, basic ultralight or as an advanced ultralight aeroplane. The SeaRey 115 is only eligible as an AULA if the carbon fiber hull is used, due to category empty weight limitations.

== Design ==
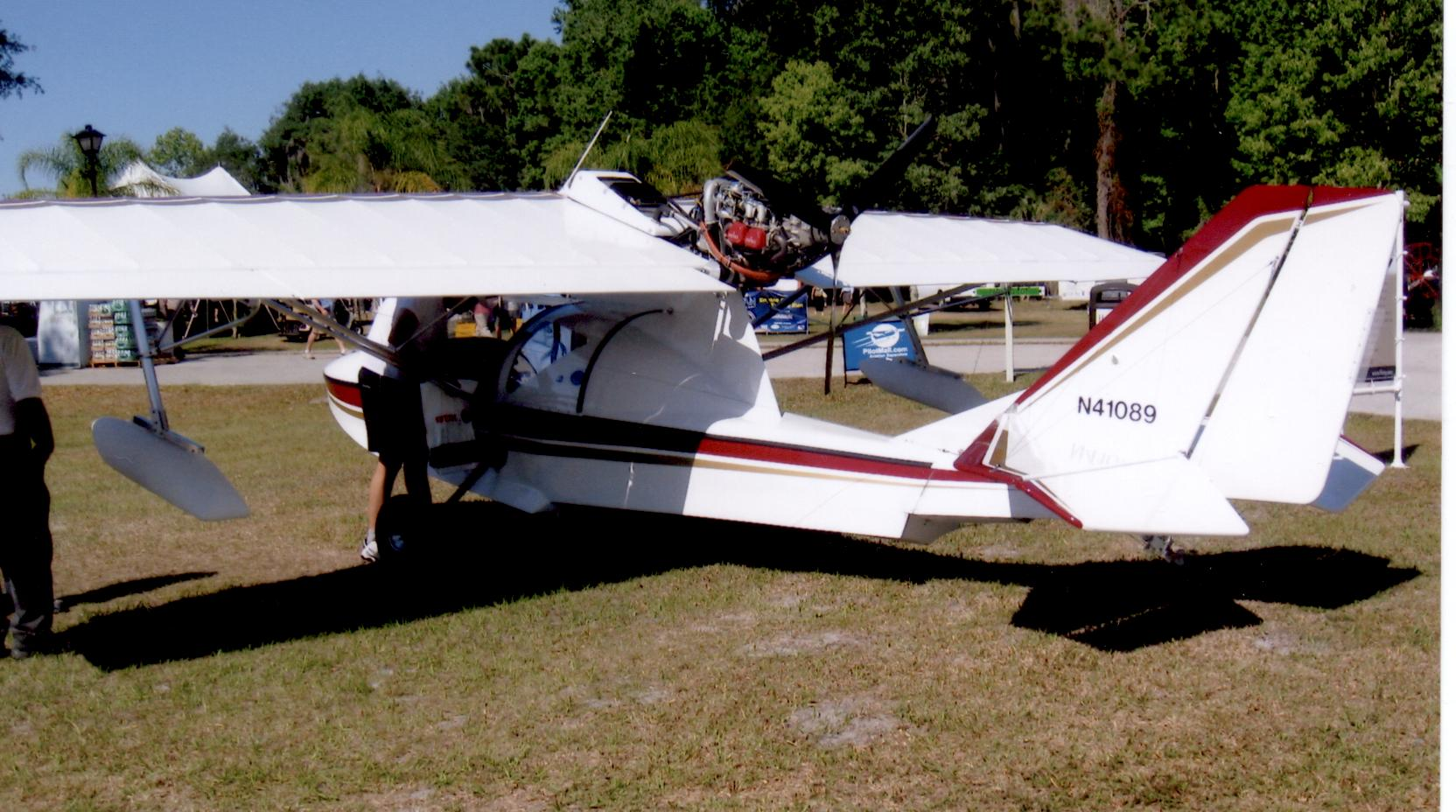
2009-built SeaRey at Sun 'n Fun, Lakeland, Florida, in April 2009, showing installation of the above-wing pusher powerplant

The SeaRey's high wing is tapered and swept back from the leading edge with a straight trailing edge. The wing, nearly 31 ft (10 m) in span, is strut-braced and covered with aircraft fabric.

Designed to be amphibious, the SeaRey has a semi-monocoque hull similar to that of a boat. The hull, nose deck, and "turtle" deck (the element which forms the top surface behind the canopy) are riveted together. In the basic configuration, these pieces are made of fiberglass; carbon graphite hull components are available at extra cost and reduce overall weight by about 70 pounds (32 kg). The wings feature rotocast plastic floats mounted on aluminum struts.

There is only one model of the SeaRey but different hull designs of increasing strength have developed over the years, designated as "A," "B" and "C" hulls. The latest "C" hull is available in either carbon fiber or fiberglass.

The windshield and the sliding canopies on either side are made of Lexan. The canopies are track-mounted, can be opened in flight and can also be locked closed on the ground.

The SeaRey's single engine is mounted above the wing, and drives a single rear-facing pusher propeller. The SeaRey can be equipped with the 64 hp (48 kW) Rotax 582, 80 hp (60 kW) Rotax 912, 100 hp (75 kW) Rotax 912S or the Rotax 914 turbocharged engine which produces 115 hp (86 kW). In December 2017 the design was undergoing testing with the turbocharged Rotax 915 iS 135 hp (101 kW) engine.

The SeaRey's landing gear consists of two main retractable wheels and a tailwheel in conventional landing gear configuration. Originally the landing gear was retracted for water operations by means of a mechanical Johnson-bar lever that raises or lowers all three wheels simultaneously. More recent retraction options include: manual, hydraulic or electric. The electric actuator is the newest and most popular, but the manual is the lightest.

According to the factory construction time for an experienced builder to complete a SeaRey is about 400 hours, with 600 hours typical for a first time builder.

== Operational history ==
In 2012, author Richard Bach flew the SeaRey he named Puff, from Florida to his home near Seattle. That trip was chronicled in his book, Travels With Puff: A Gentle Game of Life and Death. In Puff, Bach suffered near-fatal injuries in a landing accident on San Juan Island, Washington in late 2012. He later wrote about the accident, and both his and Puff's recovery, in the book, Illusions II: The Adventures of a Reluctant Student.

In 2015, over the course of seven months, pilot Michael Smith flew around the world in a SeaRey, setting a record as the first person to fly a solo circumnavigation of the globe in a single-engine flying boat. Smith chronicled his journey in the book, "Voyage of the Southern Sun."

== Variants ==
SeaRey Adventure
Model with a fiberglass hull, powered by a 100 hp (75 kW) Rotax 912S or a 115 hp (86 kW) Rotax 914 turbocharged engine, plus analog instrument panel, sold as a ready-to-fly Special Light-sport Aircraft in the US, with a 1,430 lb (649 kg) gross weight.
SeaRey Elite
Model with a carbon fiber hull, powered by a 115 hp (86 kW) Rotax 914 turbocharged engine, with glass cockpit instrument panel and other upgrades, sold as a ready-to-fly Special Light-sport Aircraft in the US, with a 1,430 lb (649 kg) gross weight.
SeaRey LSX
Kit-built model for the homebuilt aircraft category in the US, with a 1,505 lb (683 kg) gross weight and optional carbon fiber hull.

SeaRey "Classic"
Kit-built model for the homebuilt aircraft category in the US, pre-dated the LSA/LSX version. Some experimental Seareys have A, B, or C hulls. They have smaller tails and do not have the friese ailerons found in the more recent LSA and LSX kits.

== Specifications (2006 model SeaRey with Rotax 912) ==
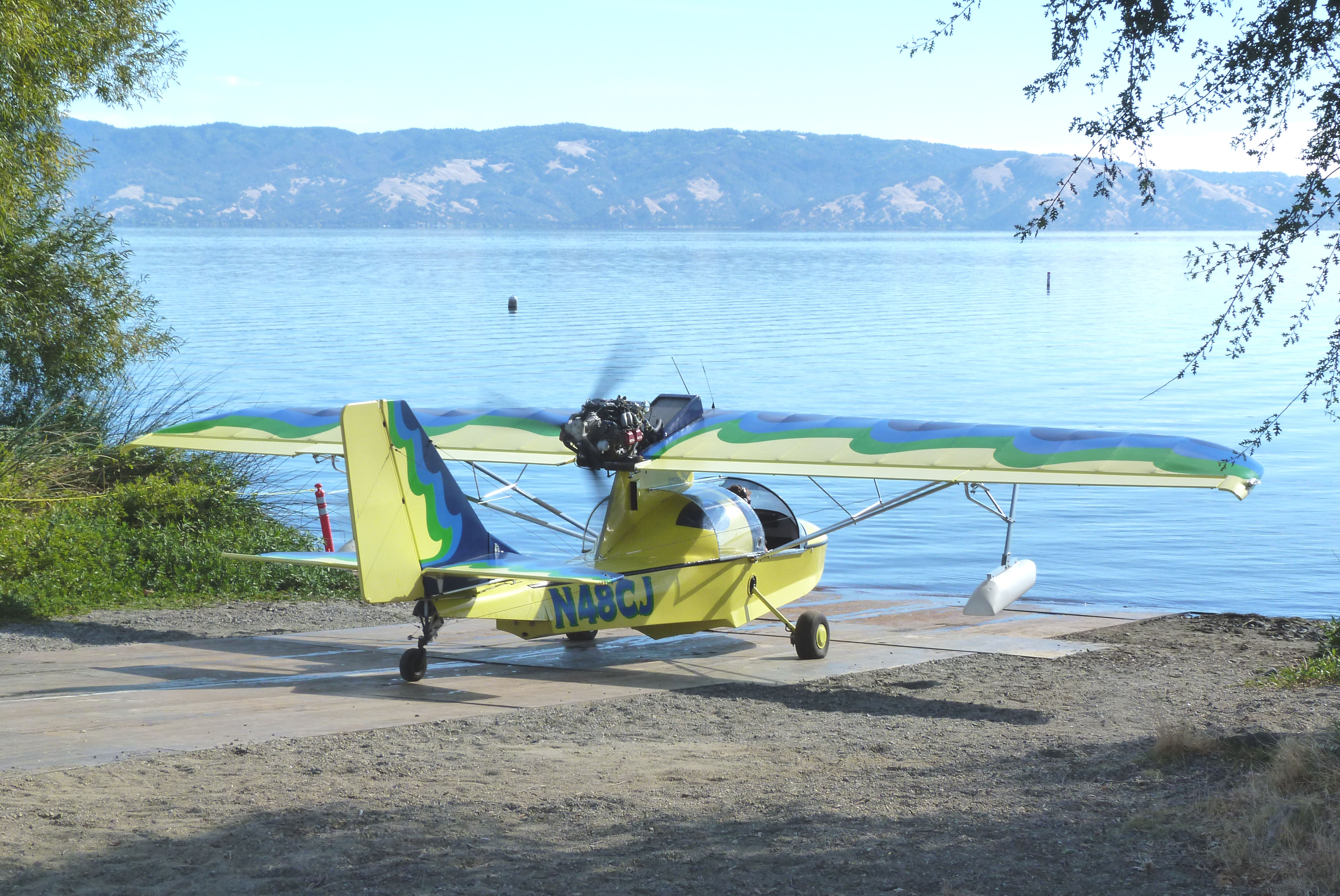
SeaRey taxiing down a seaplane ramp

Data from SeaRey.aero

General characteristics

- Crew: one
- Capacity: one passenger and 550 lb (249 kg) useful load
- Length: 22 ft 5 in (6.84 m)
- Wingspan: 30 ft 10 in (9.39 m)
- Height: 6 ft 5 in (1.96 m)
- Wing area: 157 sq ft (14.59 m^{2})
- Empty weight: 820 lb (372 kg)
- Gross weight: 1,370 lb (622 kg)
- Max takeoff weight: 1,370 lb (622 kg)
- Powerplant: 1 × Rotax 912 four cylinder horizontally opposed piston aircraft engine, 80 hp (60 kW)
- Propellers: Warp Drive Inc or Ivoprop

Performance

- Maximum speed: 120 mph (194 km/h, 100 kn)
- Cruise speed: 85 mph (138 km/h, 74 kn)
- Stall speed: 42 mph (68 km/h, 36 kn)
- Never exceed speed: 120 mph (194 km/h, 100 kn)
- Service ceiling: 12,500 ft (3,700 m)
- Rate of climb: 600 ft/min (3.05 m/s)
- Wing loading: 8.73 lb/sq ft (39.6 kg/m^{2})

== See also ==
Aircraft of comparable role, configuration, and era

- AeroVolga Borey
- AirMax SeaMax
- EDRA Aeronautica Super Pétrel
- Icon A5
- LISA Akoya
- MVP Model 3
- Nordic Omsider
- Osprey GP3 Osprey 2
- Seawind International Seawind

Related lists

- List of flying boats and floatplanes
