= Michael Smith (aviator) =

Australian aviator

- Born: 1968 (age 57–58)
- Occupation: Aviator

Michael Smith is an aviator who became the first person to solo navigate the world in a single-engine flying boat. Smith was named Australian Geographic Adventurer of the Year in 2016.

Smith took off from Melbourne, Australia in his SeaRey aircraft named Southern Sun in April 2015, intending to retrace the historic 1938 Sydney to London route of the Qantas Empire Flying Boat service. He reached London 8 weeks later, but did not receive much media attention. Smith decided to just "keep going". He crossed the Atlantic Ocean via Greenland, and arrived in New York, landing on the Hudson river. He then flew the entire length of the Mississippi river - a distance of 3,766 km/2,350 miles. Then, starting from Alaska, he began a challenging flight across the north Pacific ocean, crossing via the Aleutian Islands. This section of the journey involved flying for 25 hours straight, without the use of autopilot. He arrived in Japan, and from there flew on to Australia, landing at Longreach, Queensland on 11 November 2015. He thus became the first person to navigate solo around the world in a single-engine flying boat. The 210-day journey required 480 hours flying, 9,700 litres of fuel and stops at 80 cities along the way.
