= Tisserand Hydroplum =

Hydroplum

General information
- Type: Single-seat amphibious ultralight
- National origin: France
- Designer: Claude Tisserand
- Number built: 3 Hydroplums, some 60 French Pétrel kits

History
- First flight: late September 1983

The Tisserand Hydroplum is a small amphibious aircraft with a single, pusher engine, built in France in the 1980s. Originally a single-seat, high-wing monoplane, it was developed into a two-seat biplane for production in kit form as the SMAN Pétrel.

== Design and development ==
The first Hydroplum was designed, built and test flown by Claude Tisserand during 1983. It has a wooden, fabric covered structure. The rectangular plan wing has a single spar and 2.8° of dihedral. It has no ailerons, roll instead being controlled by 40% span spoilers. The wing is mounted above the hull on a flat sided pylon and braced by a single strut on each side to the lower hull longeron. The Hydroplum's Hirth engine is mounted in pusher configuration on the pylon with its propeller shaft in the plane of the wing. Its single-seat, unenclosed cockpit is immediately ahead of the pylon.

The hull is short, with a shallow V-shaped planing bottom and a single step. At the rear of the hull a boom projects aft and slightly upwards, bearing the swept fin and rudder and low set, rectangular tailplane and one piece elevator. On water, a pair of underwing floats, each located at about midspan and suspended on a pair of struts, one to the spar and one forward to the leading edge, provide lateral stability. Early photographs show them with flat bottoms, though a drawing indicates a more conventional V-shape. A water rudder can be lowered from the back of the hull for steering on the surface. On land the Hydroplum has a conventional undercarriage with a pair of mainwheels which retract into the sides of the hull and a tailwheel, also retractable, in the rear of the plaining bottom.

The Hydroplum first flew at the end of September 1983. Testing resulted in some trimming and centre of gravity adjustments. The first take-off from land was made on 26 May 1984. The Hydroplum flew the following month at the Paris Aero Show in 1985, equipped with the flat-bottomed floats. It was put into store after 35 hours of flight whilst Tisserand concentrated on commercialization of the design. At least one other Hydroplum was built from plans provided by him.

Soon after the Paris show Tisserand began modifying the design to make it suitable for homebuilding from commercially produced kits, deciding that it should become a two seater with glass fibre fuselage and wings, though the empennage remained wood. He prepared the fuselage moulds and the half shell castings, sub-contracting the wing to what would become ARPLAS. The greatest change was that the Hydroplum II was a single bay biplane rather than a monoplane, a revision made to simplify transport by shortening the span.

The Hydroplum II is an unequal span, single bay biplane with V-from interplane struts. The fabric covered wings are again of constant chord and square tipped, though the lower wing has wing tip, retractable floats. The upper wing spoilers were moved from the main spar to the trailing edge, mounted on false spars. The fuselage was widened to accommodate two side-by-side in an open cockpit and refined aft, under a revised pylon which now rose from a rounded, raised upper fairing. The tailplane was raised to above the boom and the tailwheel undercarriage of the Hydroplum replaced with tricycle gear. The Hydroplum II is powered by a 48 kW (65 hp) Rotax 532 flat-twin.

The Hydroplum II first flew on 1 November 1986; it was sold the following September. The production, kit built, Hydroplum II was introduced in September 1987 under that name but was soon marketed as the Société Morbihannaise d'Aéro Navigation SMAN Pétrel. These differed from the prototype only in offering an enclosed cabin and, later, the 60 kW (80 hp) Rotax 912 flat-four engine. After SMAN collapsed in 1994, Biilie Marine briefly continued kit production in France. When they ceased production in the late 1990s, some 60 kits had been sold. Development then passed to the Americas; in Brazil it was developed into the EDRA Aeronautica Paturi and Super Pétrel and Canada as the AAC SeaStar.

In late September or early October 1992 a final variant, the Hydroplum bis or Hydroplum Ia, was flown. This, the Hydroplum prototype reworked, has wings cropped by 1 m (39 in), wing tip floats, an integrated water rudder and tailwheel and spoilers moved from the rear to the front of the wing spar to improve their efficiency. The smaller span raised the maximum speed from 110 km/h (68 mph) to 130 km/h (81 mph), but also increased stalling speed and landing run. Tisserand flew it until November 1992, then sold it.

== Operational history ==
Two Hydroplums remain on the French civil register in 2010, both in Corsica where they were built. 32 SMAN Pétrels are on the civil European (Russia excluded) aircraft registers in 2010.

== Variants ==
Hydroplum
Original monoplane, Hirth engine, flown 1983. Wooden, single-seat, designed for homebuilding from plans.
Hydroplum Ia
1992 revision of Hydroplum. Reduced span, modified spoilers and tailwheel/water rudder, tip floats.
Hydroplum II
Biplane, largely glass fibre, Rotax 532 engine, flown 1986. Two side-by-side seats, tricycle gear, raised tailplane.
Pétrel
Production, kit build version of Hydroplum II.

== Specifications (Hydroplum) ==
Data from Ultralight and Microlight Aircraft of the World

General characteristics

- Crew: 1
- Length: 5.90 m (19 ft 4 in)
- Wingspan: 9.25 m (30 ft 4 in)
- Height: 1.60 m (5 ft 3 in)
- Wing area: 15.4 m^{2} (166 sq ft)
- Aspect ratio: 6.6
- Airfoil: NACA 2415
- Empty weight: 150 kg (331 lb)
- Max takeoff weight: 250 kg (551 lb)
- Fuel capacity: 20 L (5.3 US gal, 4.4 Imp gal)
- Powerplant: 1 × Hirth 440 cc (26.9 cu in), 30 kW (40 hp) multi V-belt output speed reduction by 2.3:1
- Propellers: 1.50 m (4 ft 11 in) diameter pusher

Performance

- Maximum speed: 110 km/h (68 mph, 59 kn)
- Cruise speed: 80 km/h (50 mph, 43 kn) economic
- Stall speed: 50 km/h (31 mph, 27 kn)
- Never exceed speed: 130 km/h (81 mph, 70 kn)
- Range: 140 km (87 mi, 76 nmi)
- Service ceiling: 3,000 m (9,800 ft) service
- Maximum glide ratio: 13:1 best, power off at 70 km/h (44 mph; 38 kn)
- Rate of climb: 5.0 m/s (980 ft/min) maximum at sea level
- Rate of sink: 1.7 m/s (330 ft/min) minimum, power off at 70 km/h (44 mph; 38 kn)
- Wing loading: 16.2 kg/m^{2} (3.3 lb/sq ft) maximum
- Power/mass: 119 W/kg (0.072 hp/lb)
- Take-off distance on land: 60 m (200 ft)
- Take-off distance on water: 80 m (260 ft)
