= MVP Model 3 =

Model 3
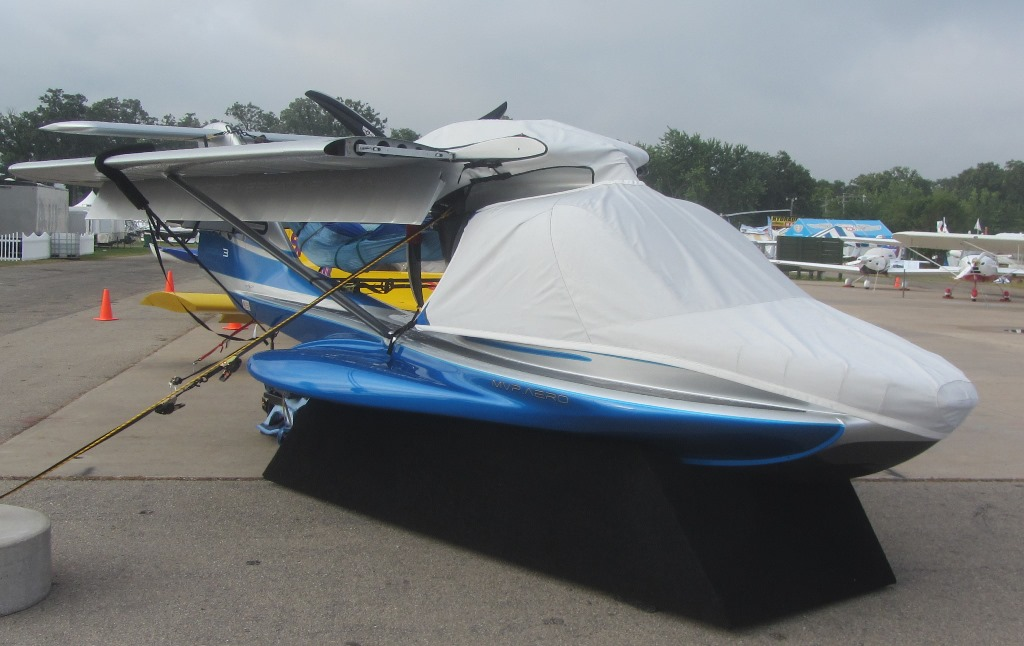
- MVP Model 3 prototype on display

General information
- Type: Amphibious light sport aircraft
- Manufacturer: MVP.aero
- Designer: Mike Van Staagen
- Status: Cancelled

History
- Introduction date: 2014

The MVP Model 3 was a prototype American "triphibian" light-sport aircraft, displayed in mockup form in 2014. The aircraft was under development by MVP.AERO Inc. (sometimes styled MVP.aero). Its developer has since ceased operations.

The company was incorporated in Delaware in 2011 by father and son Darrell and Michael Lynds and friend Steve Pugh. Its design and engineering team, led by Mike Van Staagen, was based in Duluth, Minnesota, with management and administration in Minneapolis. In January 2016, it was announced that the plane would be built in Brunswick, Maine. Although, by February 2022, the program had been cancelled.

== Design and development ==
The MVP Model 3 was designed to operate on land, water, snow and ice. The floor panels were intended to be rearranged to accommodate fishing or camping. The design would be marketed in several versions, including the E-AB, E-LSA, and S-LSA. The aircraft was a two-seater in side-by-side configuration with a pusher propeller and folding wings, which were to be constructed with carbon-fiber composite spars and covered with fabric. The balance of the airframe was constructed from a combination of carbon fiber and fiberglass. Electric thrusters helped the aircraft maneuver in the water.

The design allowed the canopy to be raised on a four bar system to sit above the engine cowling. This left the cockpit area open for fishing from and can also allow mounting of a tent for camping, with the floor panels inserted. With the canopy fully open the engine was intended to still run for water maneuvering.

The Model 3's lead designer, Mike Van Staagen, is a former Cirrus Aircraft engineer who played a key role in the design and development of the Cirrus Vision SF50 personal jet, as well as the Cirrus SR20 and SR22 composite light aircraft. Cirrus co-founder Alan Klapmeier served on the company's advisory board.

== Variants ==
Model 3 E-AB
Model 3 E-LSA
Model 3 S-LSA

== Specifications (MVP Model 3) ==
Data from MVP Aero

General characteristics

- Crew: one
- Capacity: one passenger
- Length: 23 ft 9 in (7.24 m) wings extended, 8.1 m (26 ft 7 in) wings folded
- Wingspan: 36 ft 0 in (10.97 m)
- Width: 8 ft 0 in (2.44 m) wings folded
- Fuel capacity: 26 US gal (22 imp gal; 98 L)
- Powerplant: 1 × Rotax 914 horizontally-opposed piston aircraft engine, 115 hp (86 kW)

Performance

- Cruise speed: 104 kn (120 mph, 193 km/h) at sea level
- Stall speed: 41 kn (47 mph, 76 km/h) with full flaps
- Rate of climb: 1,000 ft/min (5.1 m/s) at sea level
- Wing loading: 11 lb/sq ft (54 kg/m^{2})

== See also ==
Aircraft of comparable role, configuration, and era

- Vickers Aircraft Wave
- AeroVolga Borey
- ATOL 650 LSA
- ICON A5
- LISA Akoya
- Progressive Aerodyne SeaRey
- Osprey 2
- Quikkit Glass Goose
- Seawind International Seawind
