= EDRA Aeronautica Super Pétrel =

Amphibious pusher configuration biplane

Super Petrel
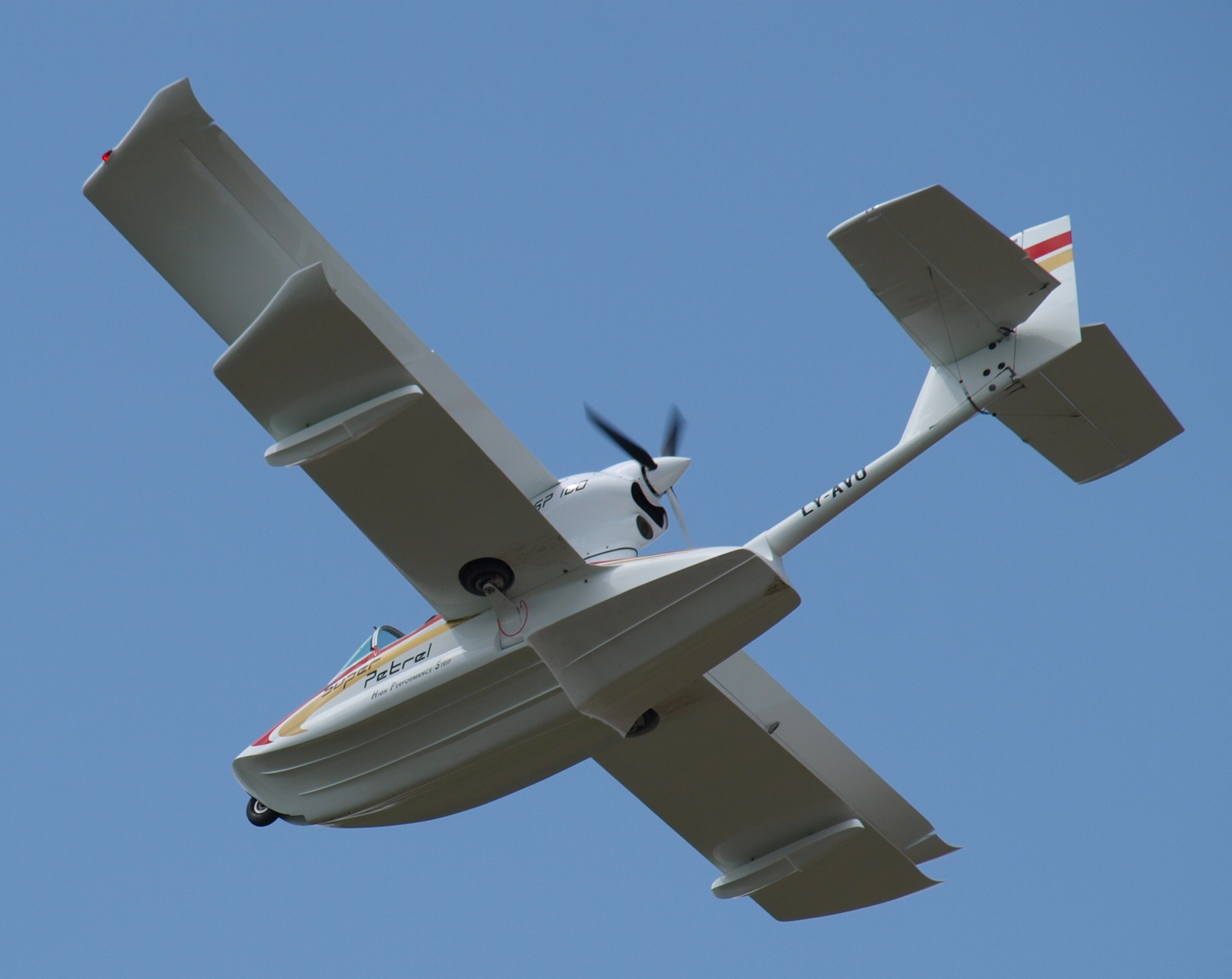
- Lithuanian-registered Super Petrel

General information
- Type: Two-seat amphibious biplane
- National origin: Brazil
- Manufacturer: EDRA Aeronáutica; Scoda Aeronáutica
- Status: in production
- Number built: 379 by December 2020; further 160 kits by end 2007.

History
- Introduction date: 2002
- Developed from: SMAN Pétrel

The EDRA Aeronautica Super Pétrel is an amphibious pusher configuration biplane, seating two side-by-side, brought into production in Brazil in 2002 though with French parentage. It remained in production in 2011, in kit and flyaway forms.

== Design and development ==
The design of the Super Petrel has its origins in the Tisserand Hydroplum, a single-seat, wooden amphibian intended for kit building first flown in 1983 and its two-seat, Rotax 532-powered development, the Hydroplum II, in 1986. The Société Morbihannaise d'Aéro Navigation (SMAN) acquired production rights to the latter in 1987, marketing it as the Pétrel, and passed them on to Billie Marine when SMAN ceased trading. In 2002 the Super Petrel 100 was developed by Edra Aeronautica.

By 2014 the design was being produced by Scoda Aeronáutica of Ipeúna, São Paulo, Brazil.

The Super Petrel is of mixed construction, though with much use of composite materials. The wings have tubular aluminium alloy spars combined with PVC foam ribs. The leading edges and wingtips are formed from glass fibre composite, with fabric covering elsewhere. The wings have constant chord and zero sweep, with angled winglet tips; the upper wing has the greater span, less dihedral (2° 13′ compared with 3° 26′). There is slight stagger. The Super Petrel is a single bay biplane with N-form aluminium interplane struts with an additional diagonal strut in each bay from the lower fuselage to the top of the interplane struts. The centre section is supported by a pylon or cabane which also contains the engine mounting. Ailerons are carried only by the upper wings; there are no flaps. The wings can be disassembled in about 30 minutes for transportation by trailer.

The single-step hull is an epoxy/carbon fibre foam monocoque, with a carbon fibre boom supporting the all-composite, cruciform and wire braced tail unit. The rear control surfaces are balanced. The cockpit is forward of the central pylon and seats two side-by-side with dual controls. It may be flown open, with just a windscreen, or enclosed by the single piece, forward-hinged canopy. There is a baggage compartment behind the seating. The Super Petrel has a short legged tricycle undercarriage for land operation; the main units, which have hydraulic brakes, retract upwards through 90° into the sides of the hull with the wheels exposed but recessed into the underside of the lower wing. The steerable nosewheel retracts forward, leaving the tyre partly exposed as a docking fender. A pair of small, stepped floats on the lower wings below the interplane struts stabilise the aircraft on water.

The Super Petrel is powered by a 73.5 kW (98.6 hp) Rotax 912ULS flat-four engine mounted in pusher configuration on the central pylon just below the upper wing. It drives a three-blade Airplast propeller, either a fixed pitch model 175 or an electrically controlled, variable pitch model PV 50.

== Operational history ==
Seven Super Petrel appeared on the civil aircraft registers of European countries, excluding Russia in mid-2010. There have also been sales in North America, Africa, Australia and New Zealand as well as in Brazil where there were 50 registered by December 2009.

== Variants ==
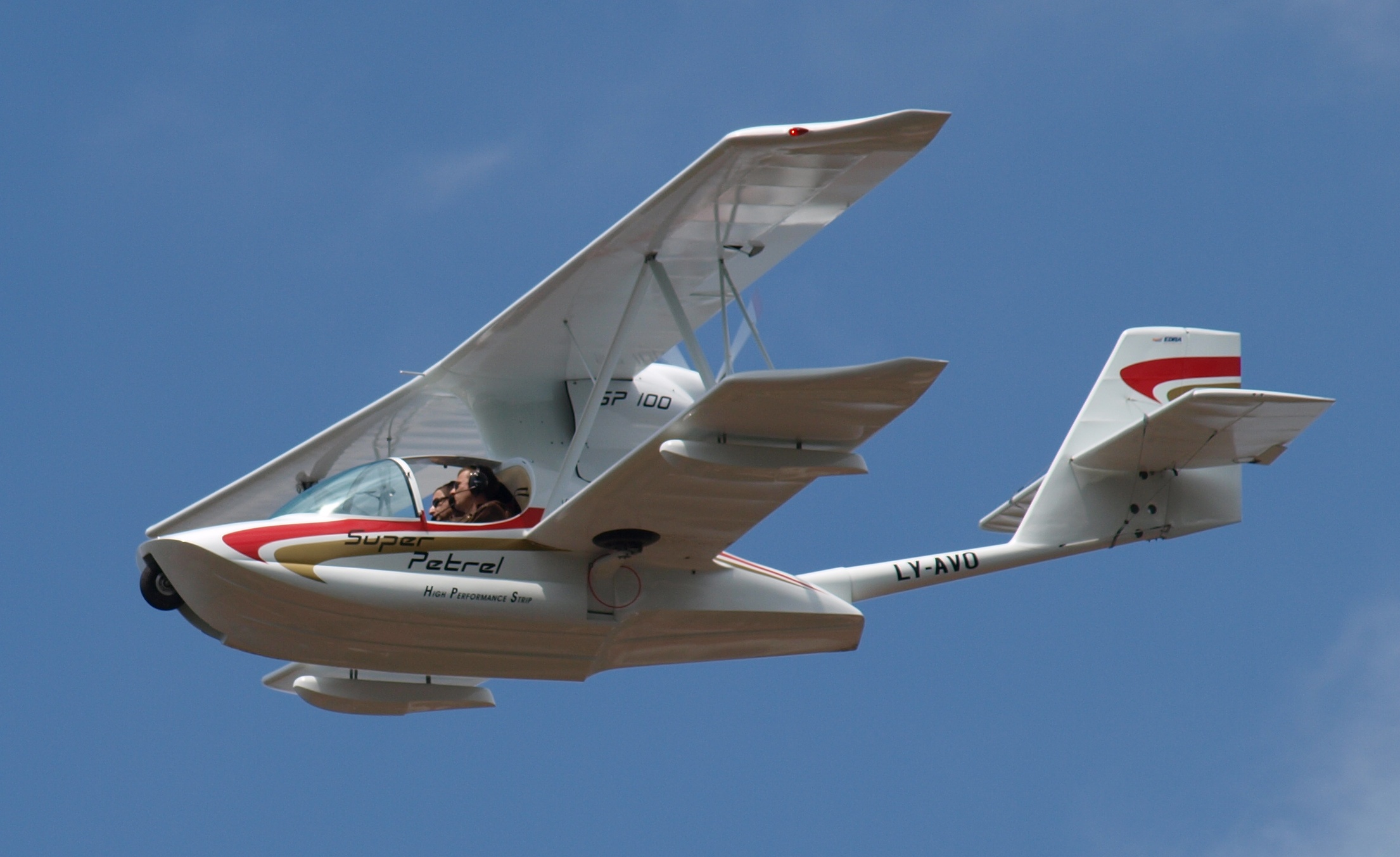
Super Petrel 100

Super Petrel 100
Designed in 2002. Lowered engine line, revised undercarriage and controls. Structural alterations with more carbon fibre; wingtips with washout and winglets which increased the span of both wings; floats moved from tips to wing underside.
Super Petrel LS
Designed in 2009. 280 mm (11 in) longer and with a 25 km/h (16 mph) increase in cruising speed; greater fuel capacity; redesigned cabin and tail group.
AAC SeaStar SP
North American version marketed by Amphibian Airplanes of Canada (AAC).

== Accidents ==
As of August 13, 2023, the Super Petrel has been involved in four accidents subject to NTSB investigation in the United States, two of which were fatal.

The first accident, on June 13, 2007 in Palm Harbor, FL, resulting in one minor injury and substantial damage to the aircraft, was a collision with a lake after a failure to maintain control of a homebuilt Super Petrel during an attempted water landing. The NTSB cited the pilot's "lack of qualification", as he did not hold a seaplane rating, and lack of experience on the type as factors in the accident.

The second accident, on August 25, 2019 in Lancaster, CA, resulted in no injuries but substantial damage to the factory-built aircraft when the pilot conducted a forced landing in an open field due to a total loss of engine power caused by improper sealing of both carburetor bowls.

The third accident occurred on October 2, 2022 near Perma, MT with two on board, resulting in the death of the pilot and substantial damage to the aircraft when it impacted the river after a collision with a power transmission line. The surviving passenger had not noticed the power line prior to the accident.

The most recent accident occurred on August 13, 2023 on Lake Hickory, NC, resulting in the fatalities of both on board when it struck the lake after colliding with a power line, knocking out power to at least 10,000 customers.

== Specifications (Super Petrel LS) ==
Data from Jane's All the World's Aircraft 2010/11

General characteristics

- Capacity: two
- Length: 6.25 m (20 ft 6 in)
- Upper wingspan: 8.90 m (29 ft 2 in)
- Height: 2.33 m (7 ft 8 in)
- Wing area: 15.00 m^{2} (161.5 sq ft)
- Airfoil: NACA 2412
- Empty weight: 320 kg (705 lb)
- Max takeoff weight: 600 kg (1,323 lb)
- Fuel capacity: 90 L (23.8 US gal; 19.8 Imp gal)
- Powerplant: 1 × Rotax 912 ULS flat four, air- and water-cooled, 73.5 kW (98.6 hp)
- Propellers: 3-bladed Airplast 175, 1.65 m (5 ft 5 in) diameter

Performance

- Maximum speed: 190 km/h (120 mph, 100 kn)
- Cruise speed: 180 km/h (110 mph, 97 kn) maximum
- Stall speed: 56 km/h (35 mph, 30 kn)
- Never exceed speed: 210 km/h (130 mph, 110 kn)
- Range: 950 km (590 mi, 510 nmi) with maximum fuel
- Service ceiling: 3,050 m (10,010 ft) service
- g limits: +4/-2
- Rate of climb: 5.08 m/s (1,000 ft/min) maximum at sea level
- Wing loading: 40.0 kg/m^{2} (8.2 lb/sq ft) maximum
- Take-off run on land: 80 m (265 ft)
- Take-off run on water: 120 m (395 ft)
- Landing run on land: 120 m (395 ft)
- Landing run on water: 100 m (330 ft)

== See also ==
Related development

- AAC SeaStar
- AeroVolga Borey
- Tisserand Hydroplum

Aircraft of comparable role, configuration, and era

- Seawind International Seawind
