= ATOL 495 =

Finnish amphibious aircraft

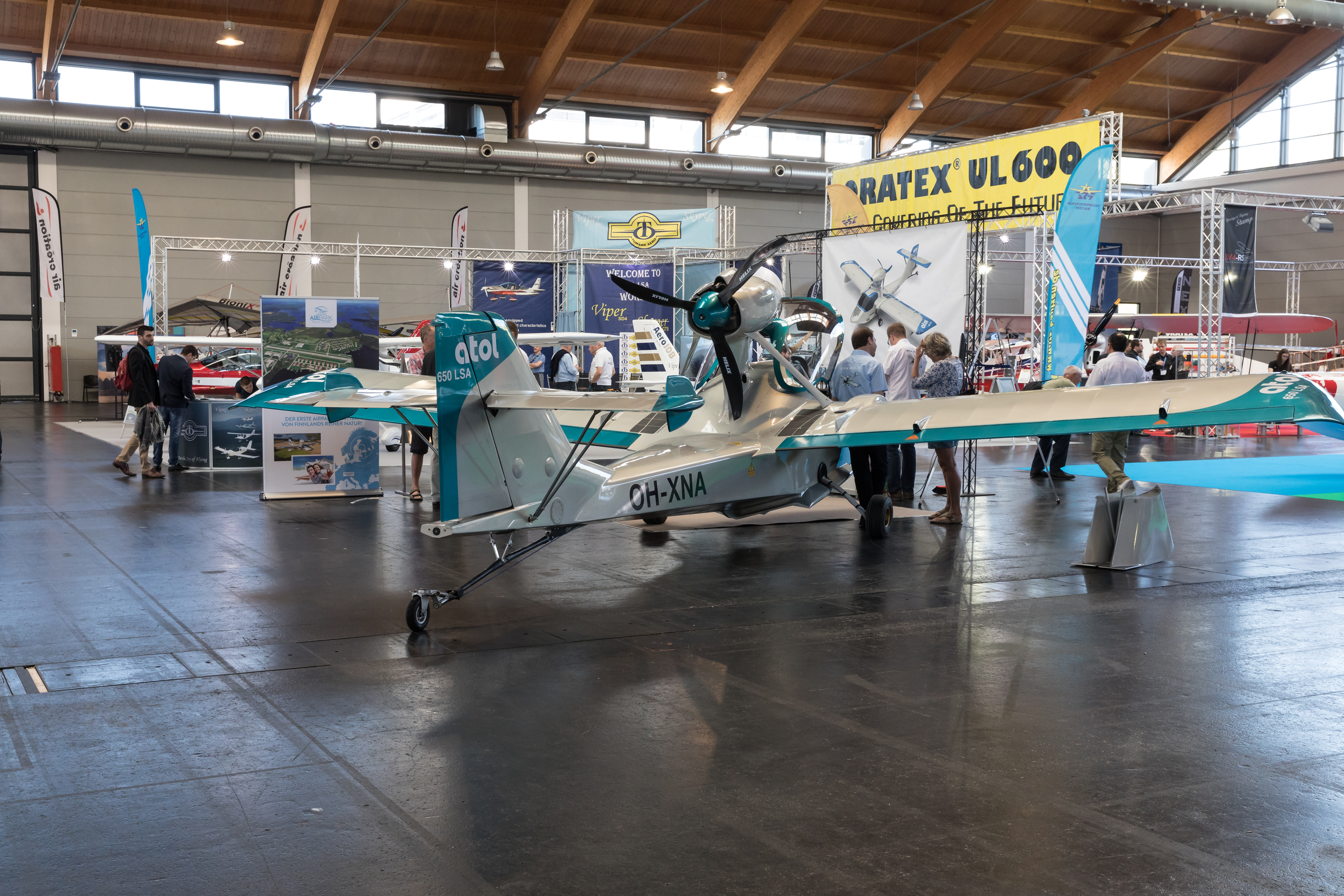
- ATOL 650 (OH-XNA) in 2018

General information
- Type: Sport amphibian
- National origin: Finland
- Manufacturer: Atol Avion; Atol USA
- Designer: Markku Koivurova
- Status: development ended
- Number built: 5

History
- First flight: 23 August 1988

Atol is a two-seat kit amphibious aircraft with a wood composite structure. It was to be built in ultralight and light-sport aircraft (LSA) versions. Atol aircraft were produced by the Finnish company Atol Avion.

In April 2017, it was announced that the aircraft would be built for the North American market by Atol USA of Brunswick Landing, Maine.

By 2022, the company website had been taken down and the domain was for sale.

== Development ==
The Atol was designed by Markku Koivurova and produced by Martekno Ky and later Atol Avion Ltd. The development of Atol began in the 1970s, inspired by the American Osprey II. The first versions of the design used the Ken Rand KR structure. Atol's predecessors were larger and their structure recalled the traditional structure of a wooden aircraft.

The first water taxi tests of the new LSA version, the Atol 650, were commenced in December 2014 on the Kemijoki River, Finland, on the Arctic Circle. This new version first flew on 9 April 2015.

The 650 model was intended to be built in Maine, United States, with European deliveries initially forecast for late in 2018 and US deliveries starting in 2019.

On 3 July 2018, the 650 LSA prototype (OH-XNA) crashed and burnt, near Rovaniemi.

By November 2022, the company website had been taken down, and the domain was for sale. It is likely all development on the aircraft has ended. The proposed American manufacturer, Atol USA, was administratively dissolved on 13 August 2021.

== Specifications (ATOL 495 LSA) ==
General characteristics

- Crew: one
- Capacity: one passenger
- Length: 7.45 m (24 ft 5 in)
- Wingspan: 9 m (29 ft 6 in)
- Wing area: 13.5 m^{2} (145 sq ft)
- Empty weight: 340 kg (750 lb)
- Max takeoff weight: 650 kg (1,433 lb)
- Fuel capacity: 75 L (16 imp gal)
- Powerplant: 1 × Rotax 912 iS , 75 kW (100 hp)
- Propellers: 3-bladed fixed pitch propeller, 1.72 m (5 ft 8 in) diameter

Performance

- Cruise speed: 170 km/h (110 mph, 92 kn)
- Stall speed: 74 km/h (46 mph, 40 kn)
- Range: 750 km (470 mi, 400 nmi)
- Endurance: 5 hours
- Take-off distance from water: 450 m (1,476 ft) (LSA)

== Notes ==
- Bodin, Jan: Perpetual Product Development - a Study of Small Technology-Driven Firms 2000, p. 143-151, University of Umeå's print, Umeå Sweden, 2000. ISBN 91-7191-752-7
- Joensuu, Elina: Design in Finland 30 Years 1991, p. 30, Hämee's bookprint Ltd, Häme Finland, 1991. ISSN 0418-7717
