= Seawind International Seawind =

American amphibious aircraft

Seawind
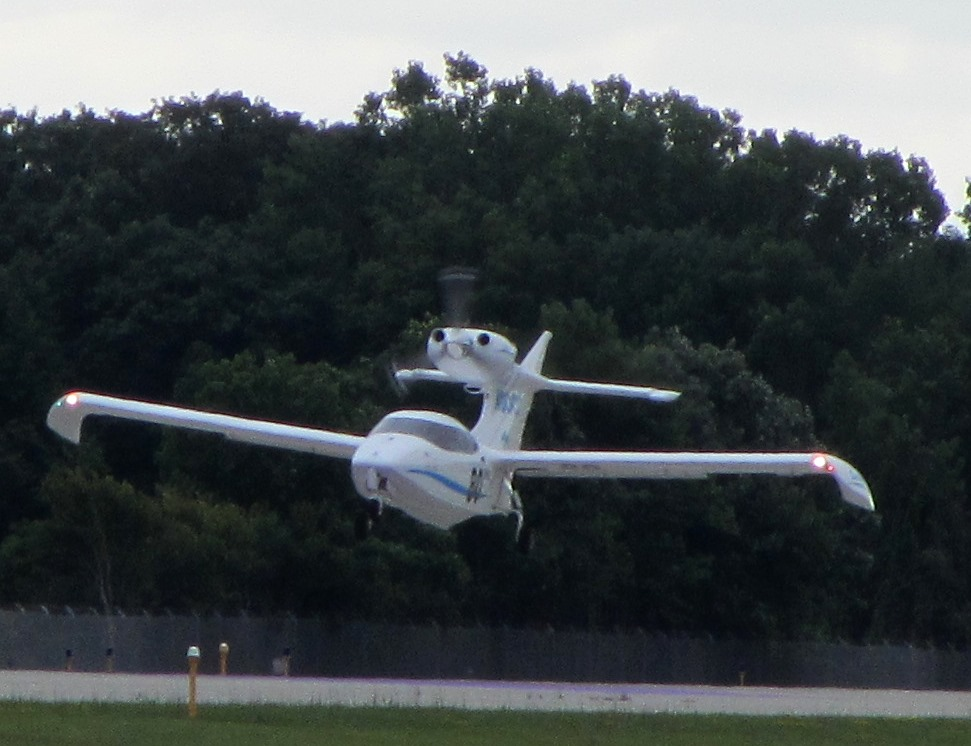
- Seawind landing

General information
- Type: Amphibian
- Manufacturer: Seawind LLC
- Status: Seawind 2000 - production completed Seawind 3000 - production completed in December 2002; Seawind 300C -
- Number built: From kits: about 80, prototypes: 2 Certified aircraft: none

History
- First flight: 23 August 1982

The Seawind is a family of composite, four-seat, amphibian airplanes that all feature a single tail-mounted engine. They have been produced as kits and were at one time under development to be sold as completed aircraft.

The Seawind design originated in Canada, where the prototype flew for the first time on 23 August 1982. Later development and production was carried out by Seawind International of Haliburton, Ontario, Canada, before the rights were acquired by SNA and production moved to Kimberton, Pennsylvania, United States. The major production versions of the Seawind line consist of the kit-built Seawind 2000 and Seawind 3000 and the Seawind 300C that was under development by Seawind LLC, also of Kimberton, Pennsylvania. The Seawind 3000 was introduced in 1993.

Production of Seawind 3000 kits was suspended in 2002 to concentrate on certification of the 300C and the kits are no longer available.

The Seawind 300C was intended to be the certified production version, derived from the kit-built Seawind 3000. It incorporated many changes required to conform to the certification standards. The company indicated that certification flight testing would continue after the crash of the prototype on August 16, 2007, but did not actually resume until early 2010. Certification flight testing continued through the summer and autumn of 2011, but by the end of 2020 the company website had been taken down and the company seems to have ceased business.

== Design ==
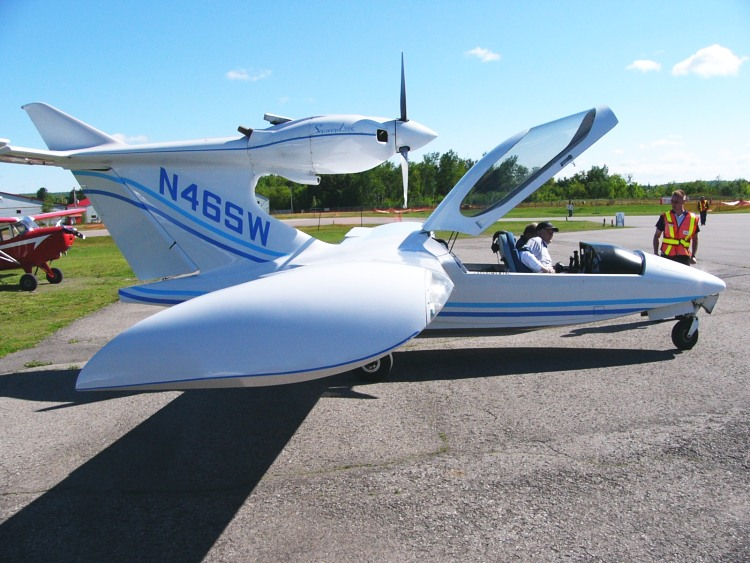
Seawind 3000

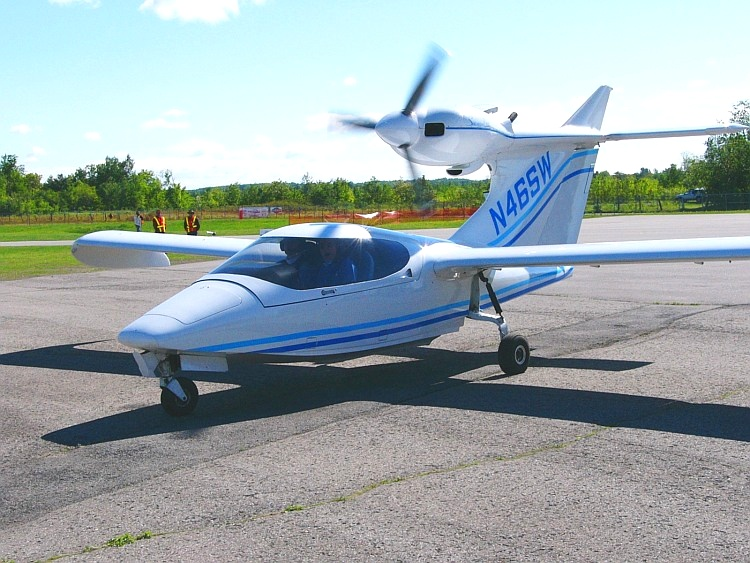
Seawind 3000

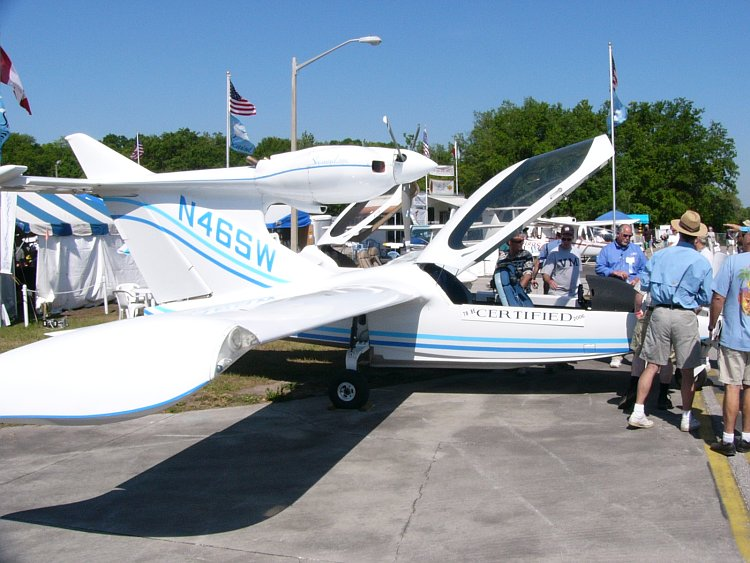
Seawind showing a "certified" placard while on display at Sun 'n Fun 2006. In fact it was a kit-built Seawind 3000 which was used as a marketing aircraft for the 300C.

The Seawind is most distinctive for its engine pod, which juts forward from the leading edge of the very large vertical fin. The design is also noted for its long, low profile and sleek curves made practical by composite construction.

The Seawind is relatively quiet for the crew, primarily because the engine is above and behind the cabin and the exhaust is routed up and aft. Some amphibian aircraft use a pusher propeller arrangement, which causes the exhaust to pass through the propeller plane which can increase noise. The Seawind uses a conventional tractor propeller arrangement that avoids this issue.

The cabin is very wide for an airplane of this type and seats 4 adults. A factory option replaces the aft executive bucket seats with seating for 3 children. The wide cabin also supports a large instrument panel, allowing installation of virtually any avionics.

There are three cargo compartments: under the nose deck ahead of the canopy, behind the rear seats in the cabin, and the tailcone.

The wing uses a constant-chord NASA NLF airfoil drooped at the ends. The wingtips provide some endplate effect to increase ground effect and reduce induced drag. They also serve as wingtip floats. The wing has a reflexed (negative angle of attack) trailing edge to reduce drag at cruise.

The Seawind 2000 and 3000's retractable landing gear is hinged to the side of the hull and folds up into the wing for flight and water operations. The certified landing gear is a trailing link-type, fully mounted in the wing.

An electric/hydraulic powerpack provides hydraulic power for the flaps, landing gear and nose-wheel steering. The hydraulic pack and battery are located in the nose compartment.

Fuel is gravity fed from the main tanks to a header tank to supply the engine. Optional long range tanks in the wing tips have electric pumps to transfer fuel to the main tanks. Fuel can also be pumped from side to side to correct any lateral imbalance.

Steering on land is provided by differential braking. Hydraulic nose-wheel steering is available as an option. A retractable water rudder is slaved to the air rudder for water operation.

== Development ==
The Seawind was originally designed in the late seventies in Haliburton, Ontario. Seawind kits were developed and sold by SNA Inc. of Kimberton, Pennsylvania, United States. Seawind LLC was formed to certify the Seawind design as a complete aircraft and market it as the Seawind 300C. The Seawind 300C factory is located in Saint-Jean-sur-Richelieu, Quebec, Canada.

=== Seawind 2000 ===
The Seawind 2000 was the first kit prototype, powered by a 200 hp (149 kW) Lycoming IO-360 engine. Although top and cruise speeds were respectable, SNA felt that the aircraft needed more power. A 300 hp (224 kW) engine was installed, as well as several modifications, to create the Seawind 3000.

=== Seawind 3000 ===
In addition to the larger engine, the Seawind 3000 had changes to the hull and step configuration. The Seawind 2000 canopy was hinged to allow opening from either side while the 3000 was hinged to open at the back.

The Seawind 3000 first flew in late March 1993. The first prototype crashed during testing on 3 April 1993 with test pilot Bob Mills and SNA president Dick Silva on board. After several routine tests, they attempted to simulate an engine-out situation reducing the engine power and setting the prop pitch to high. However, due to a malfunction, the propeller went into reverse pitch. This caused excessive drag and prevented the propeller from windmilling. The crew attempted to reach the runway but, due to the high descent rate and reverse thrust, they landed in rough terrain short of the runway at approximately 80 mph (129 km/h), hitting several boulders on two sides of an embankment. The crash forces were estimated to be in excess of 20Gs. Although the aircraft suffered extensive damage, both crew suffered only muscle strains. The crash also showed the strength of the composite structure and, in particular, the vertical fin/engine pylon arrangement. Some skeptics had felt this was a potential weak point in the Seawind design, although the pylon is capable of 15G vertical and 20G forward loading, more than twice the certification requirement.

The prototype was rebuilt with a non-reversible constant speed propeller and testing resumed in December 1993.

SNA estimated that it would take the average builder 2000 hours to complete a Seawind 3000 kit. A "Kwick Kit" option was also available, which provided some of the major components pre-assembled to reduce the build time to approximately 1600 hours.

A standard kit was US$59,900 in 1999. A Kwick Kit cost an extra US$14,500. SNA estimated that it would cost US$40,000-65,000 for the necessary components not included with the kit. A fully assembled Seawind kit with instruments typically cost over US$200,000.

The first customer built Seawind 3000 was completed in mid-1994.

=== Seawind 300C ===
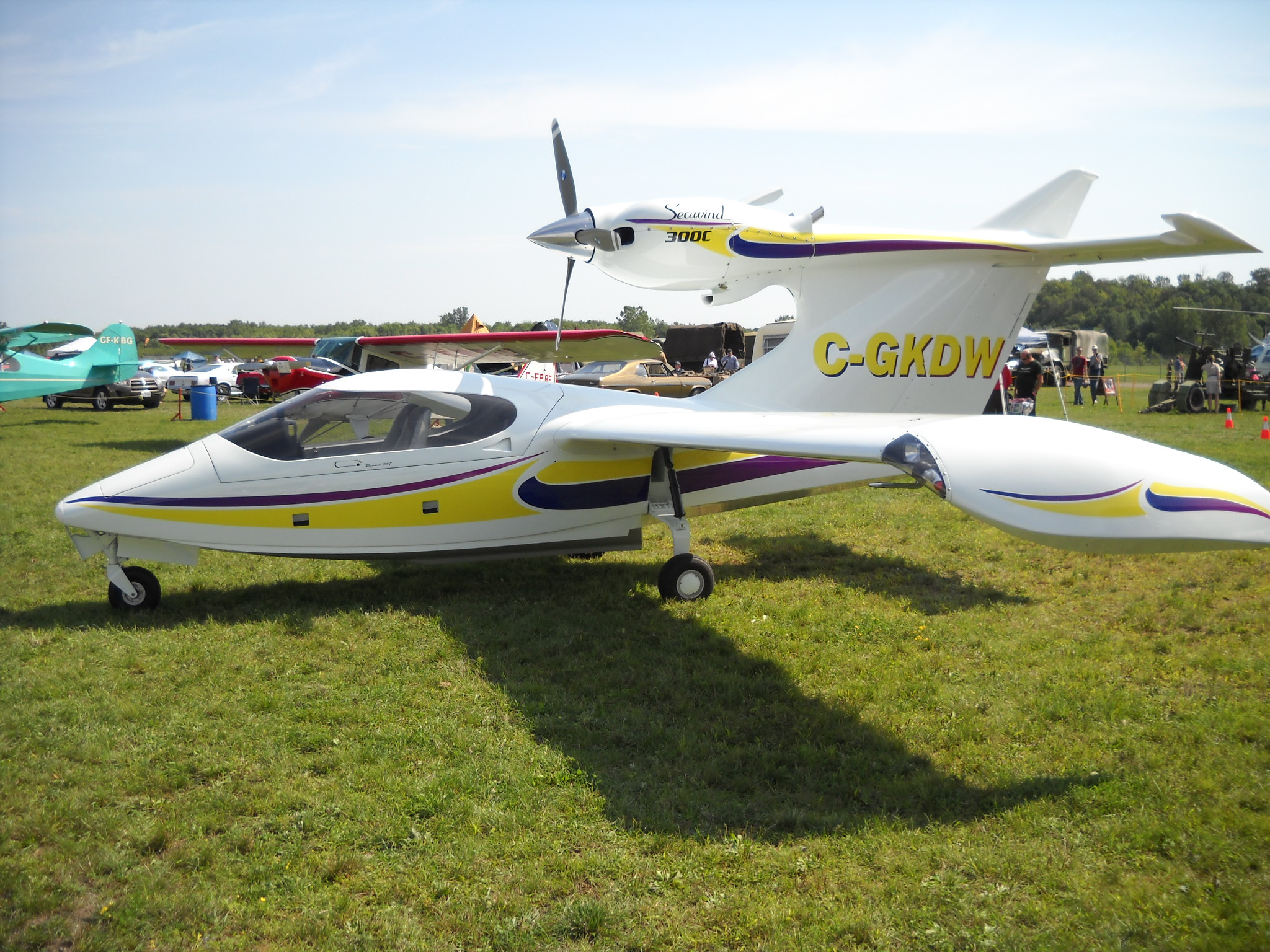
A Seawind 3000 amateur-built carrying the markings of a Seawind 300C certified aircraft

The Seawind 300C was developed from the 3000 and incorporated many changes needed to conform to the Canadian CAR 523 standards. Flight testing was commenced in Canada as the aircraft is intended to be manufactured at the plant at Saint-Jean-sur-Richelieu, Quebec. Reciprocal certification in the USA under FAR 23 was intended to follow Canadian certification.

The 300C was undergoing certification testing when the prototype crashed near Winnipeg, Manitoba, on August 16, 2007, killing test pilot Glenn Ralph Holmes. At the time of the accident, the company indicated it would shut down, but in October 2007 stated that test flying would continue once additional personnel were hired and additional funding secured.

In July 2008 the company announced that was still pursuing certification and commencement of production, a task it stated would require US$4 million.

In September 2008 the company announced that it had raised US$1.2 million but required US$800,000 more to recall employees to work. The company indicated that it had two Seawind prototypes available which could be used to complete the certification flight test program. Regarding the timeline to restart the flight testing and production, company president Dick Silva stated in September 2008, "There is a limit to how long we can go without resuming the project. Time is our enemy."

In April 2009 Silva announced that the company had found sufficient funding to restart, would rehire staff and intended to have a replacement prototype ready to fly by the beginning of August 2009, with the aim of completing the certification of the 300C. The company also stated that investigation into the crash of the prototype ruled out in-flight failures or other problems with the aircraft.

The August 2009 date to recommence flight testing was not met and the aircraft was then forecast to start flight testing by contract National Research Council test pilots in February 2010, though this date was not met either. In early March 2010, Seawind announced the rollout of the test aircraft and the imminent start of taxi tests. The Seawind finally flew again later that month and was transferred to the NRC facility in Ottawa. Silva publicly announced that certification would be complete in June 2010 and that he was seeking funding for the stages beyond that, including production. By June 2010 the flight testing had just commenced with re-instrumentation and solving a landing gear door flutter issue. By the end of 2010 certification flight testing had identified two problem areas, loss of rudder effectiveness in power-off spins and lack of flap effectiveness. The former problem was to be addressed with stick shaker and stick pusher systems, labeled the Stall Prevention System, and the latter with revised flap hinge geometry to achieve a more effective slot. Flight testing continued in the spring of 2011 with testing for flutter as well as damage tolerance and fatigue testing was completed. Testing of the Stall Prevention System and water handling followed.

In April 2011 the company announced that it had 50 Seawind 300C orders, that the final design configuration was frozen as a result of progress in the certification test flying and that the company only lacked funding to start building pre-production aircraft. The final design included a "stall prevention system" that will prevent the aircraft from stalling or spinning. By June 2011 the company still confirmed that they had 50 orders.

Certification flight testing continued through the summer and autumn of 2011 with fixes for problems with adverse yaw, lateral stability, ineffective rudder trim at low power settings, pitch damping, roll/yaw damping, high rotation forces on takeoff and the stall prevention system. The aircraft had still not conducted water trials. Of the certification process the Flight Analyst Designated Airworthiness Representative, John Taylor, said "It should be recognized that the Seawind has a very unconventional configuration and as a consequence, has at times been a very challenging configuration to make compliant with FAR Part 23 certification requirements."

After a delay of a year to address issues, the prototype Seawind was returned to Ottawa for further flight testing in August 2012.

In the fall of 2012 Silva wrote that the company had suffered years of set-backs because of their dealings with Canada Revenue Agency (CRA). The company had been moved from the United States because of financial incentives available in Canada that would make aircraft certification affordable. Delays in CRA processing resulted in the company running out of operating capital between 2007 and 2009. In the end CRA denied most of the tax refunds the company had applied for. Silva wrote "This fiasco has put over a 1 million dollar hole in our budget, which was needed to complete certification. We were intent on raising at least the total of the $1,000,000 which we need to complete but which is being withheld by the CRA, who was doing everything possible to make us fail. We don’t know why and they won’t be honest with us." Silva continued, "Once the CRA turned down our 2009 refund, common business sense says slow down and preserve capital until you are sure you will receive the money. Then when the CRA jerked us around for two more years and held up two refund applications, you know they are not your friend even though they repeatedly claim 'they are from the government and here to help us'. Every week for a year, they said they would give us an answer in two weeks only to ask for more papers and to repeat the cycle. MORAL OF THE STORY: Don’t trust them. Don’t believe their website. Don’t come to Canada if you have to depend on them."

In September 2013 the company announced that the stick shaker/pusher system test certification flying had been completed and all that remained for certification was performance documentation. The company also confirmed that it still retained 50 orders for the aircraft.

By the fall of 2014 the company announced that certification water testing was still incomplete, the company lacked funds to commence production and was seeking investors.

Further delays were caused by an accident during land test flying when the National Research Council test pilot crashed the prototype from 50 ft (15 m) during a simulated engine failure and recovery test on 24 October 2014. The prototype was repaired but the National Research Council lacked a pilot with sufficient seaplane experience to complete that phase of the certification. The company had to find and install a new data acquisition system and the first one installed did not work right and had to be replaced. The company hired Canadian astronaut Bjarni Tryggvason, who completed the test flying work. The company announced that flight testing had been completed on 18 November 2016 and that all that remained to finish certification was completing and submitting the paperwork to Transport Canada and raising the funds to commence production. The company stated that it still retained 43 orders for the aircraft.

On 9 January 2019 Richard Silva, the head of the company and driving force behind the certification process, died at age 82. The company indicated that efforts to certify the design would continue, but by early 2020 the company website claim that development would continue had been removed and the "news" section blanked. By late 2020, the company website had been taken down and the domain was up for sale.

== Operational history ==
In September 2007 there were 13 Seawind 2000 and 3000 amateur-builts registered in Canada and 58 in the USA. Due to kits purchased some time ago being completed, this number is expected to increase over the next few years, minus any aircraft destroyed in accidents.

After the death of owner Richard Silva in 2019, Seawind LLC filed for bankruptcy on July 8, 2021.

== Variants ==
Seawind
Prototype Seawind aircraft
Seawind 2000
A kit version released by Seawind international at Haliburton, Ontario, Canada
Seawind 3000
Kits produced by SNA in Kimberton, Pennsylvania
Seawind 300C
A proposed factory production aircraft derived from previous Seawind kits.

== Specifications (300C) ==
Data from Seawind website, which notes that performance data is from the Seawind 3000 with a Lycoming engine

General characteristics

- Crew: 1 pilot
- Capacity: 3 adult passengers or 1 adult passenger and 3 children
- Length: 27 ft 2 in (8.28 m)
- Wingspan: 35 ft 0 in (10.67 m)
- Height: 10 ft 2 in (3.10 m)
- Wing area: 163 sq ft (15.14 m^{2})
- Airfoil: NLF(1)-0215(F)
- Empty weight: 2,300 lb (1,043 kg) useful load 1,100 lb (499 kg))
- Max takeoff weight: 3,400 lb (1,542 kg)
- Powerplant: 1 × Continental IO-550-N Flat 6 piston engine, 310 hp (231 kW)
- Propellers: 3-bladed 1, McCauley Constant Speed, 6 ft 4 in (1.93 m) diameter

Performance

- Maximum speed: 174 kn (200 mph, 322 km/h) at sea level
- Cruise speed: 147 kn (169 mph, 272 km/h) at 55% power at 8,000 ft (2438 m)
- Stall speed: 63 kn (72 mph, 116 km/h) in clean configuration
- Range: 905 nmi (1,040 mi, 1,674 km) with main tanks
- Service ceiling: 18,000 ft (5,486 m)
- Rate of climb: 1,250 ft/min (6.35 m/s)
- Wing loading: 20.8 lb/sq ft (102 kg/m^{2})
- Power/mass: .091 hp/lb (150 W/kg)
