= List of flying boats and floatplanes =

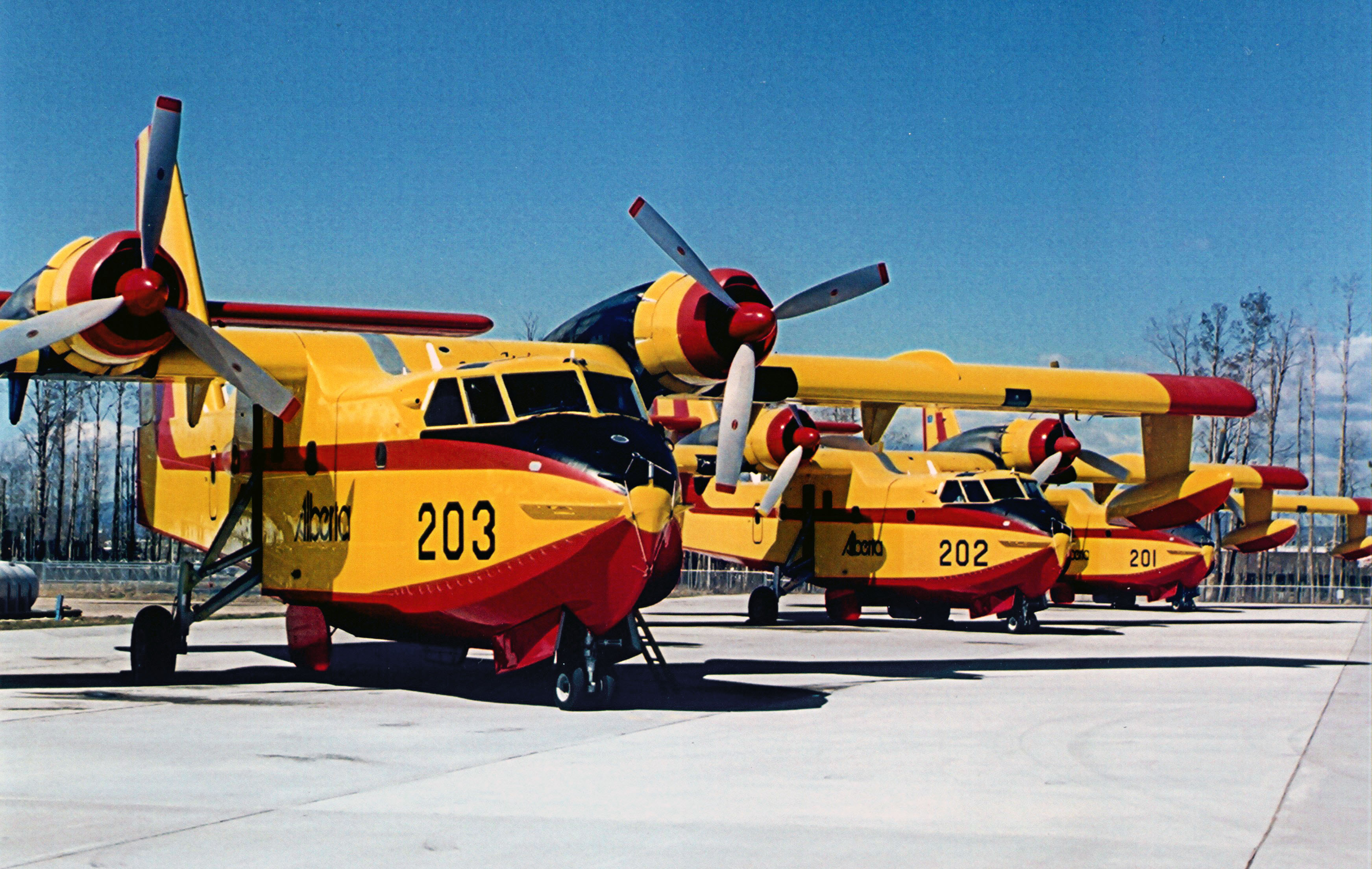
Three Canadair CL-215 amphibious flying boats

The following is a list of seaplanes, which includes floatplanes and flying boats. A seaplane is any airplane that has the capability of landing and taking off from water, while an amphibian is a seaplane which can also operate from land. (They do not include rotorcraft, or ground-effect vehicles which can only skim along close to the water)

A flying boat relies on its main hull for buoyancy, while a floatplane has a conventional aircraft fuselage fitted with external floats. In some locales, the term "seaplane" is used as a synonym for floatplane.

== List ==
A small number of seaplanes have retractable beaching gear, which is not capable of being used for landings and takeoffs, but these remain flying boats or floatplanes and are not amphibians.

Many floatplanes, especially those since 1945, can have either conventional floats for operating just from water, or amphibious floats, which have retractable undercarriage built into them.

Some experimental flying boats have used skis or hydrofoils to supplement their buoyancy when in motion, however they still rely on the buoyancy of a hull when they are not moving fast enough to lift out of the water.

Type	Country	Class	Role	Date	Status	No.	Notes
3I/Magnaghi Sky Arrow	Italy	Floatplane	Private	1992	Production		(Note: Variant of landplane. Some examples may use amphibious floats)
A41 Factory VNS-41	Vietnam	Amphibian	Trainer	2005	Production		Licence-built Che-22 Korvet
AAC SeaStar	Canada	Amphibian	Private	1998	Homebuilt	91	
AAC Seastar Sealoon	Canada	Amphibian	Private		Homebuilt	1	
AD Flying Boat	UK	Flying boat	Patrol	1915	Production	27	
AD Navyplane	UK	Floatplane	Patrol	1916	Prototype	1	
AD Seaplane Type 1000	UK	Floatplane	Attack	1915	Prototype	2	
AEA Loon	US	Floatplane	Experimental	1908	Experimental	1	
AEG Flugboot	Germany	Flying boat	Transport	1913	Prototype	1	
Aero 2H	Yugoslavia	Floatplane	Trainer	1946	production	248	
Aero A.29	Czechoslovakia	Floatplane	Target tug	1927	Production	9	
Aero Gare Sea Hawk & Sea Hawker/Quikkit Glass Goose	US	Amphibian	Private	1982	Production		
Aeromarine 39	US	Floatplane	Trainer	1917	Production	150	
Aeromarine 40	US	Flying boat	Trainer	1918	Production	50	
Aeromarine 50	US	Flying boat	Transport	1919	Production	3	
Aeromarine 75	US	Flying boat	Transport	1920	Production	8	Converted Curtiss F.5L
Aeromarine 80 Aerial Cruiser	US	Flying boat	Transport	1920	Prototype	unk.	
Aeromarine 700	US	Floatplane	Bomber	1917	Prototype	2	
Aeromarine AMC	US	Flying boat	Transport	1923	Prototype	1	
Aeromarine AS	US	Floatplane	Fighter	1920	Prototype	3	
Aeromarine EO	US	Flying boat	Transport	1924	Prototype	1	
Aeronca Chief family	US	Floatplane	Transport	1937	production	13700	
Aeroprakt A-24 Viking	Ukraine	Amphibian	Private		Prototype		
AGO C.I-W	Germany	Floatplane	Patrol	1915	production	64	
Aichi AB-6	Japan	Floatplane	Patrol	1933	Prototype	1	
Aichi E8A	Japan	Floatplane	Patrol	1934	Prototype	2	
Aichi E11A	Japan	Flying boat	Patrol	1937	Production	17	
Aichi E13A	Japan	Floatplane	Patrol	1938	Production	1418	
Aichi E16A Zuiun	Japan	Floatplane	Patrol	1942	Production	256	
Aichi H9A	Japan	Flying boat	Trainer	1940	Production	31	
Aichi M6A Seiran	Japan	Floatplane	Attack	1943	Production	26	(Note: Operated from submarines)
AirMax SeaMax/Seamax M-22	Brazil	Flying boat		2001	Production	160	
Airspeed Queen Wasp	UK	Floatplane	Target drone	1937	Production	7	
Airtime Aircraft Cygnet	US	Amphibian	Private	2009			Powered hang glider
Albatros L102W/Al 102W	Germany	Floatplane	Trainer	1932	Production	2	
Albatros W.1	Germany	Floatplane	Trainer	1914			
Albatros W.2	Germany	Floatplane	Patrol	1916	Prototype	1	
Albatros W.3	Germany	Floatplane	Bomber	1916	Prototype	1	
Albatros W.4	Germany	Floatplane	Fighter	1916	Production	118	
Albatros W.8	Germany	Floatplane		1918	Prototypes	3	
American Champion Citabria	US	Floatplane	Private	1964	Production	5238	
Anderson Kingfisher/Super Kingfisher	US	Amphibian	Private	1969	Homebuilt		
Ansaldo SVA Idro	Italy	Floatplane	Fighter	1917	Production	50	
Aquaflight Aqua I	US	Amphibian	Transport	1946	Prototypes	2	
Arado Ar 66b	Germany	Floatplane	Trainer	1932	Prototype	1	
Arado Ar 95W	Germany	Floatplane	Patrol	1937	Production	42	
Arado Ar 196	Germany	Floatplane	Patrol	1937	Production	541	
Arado Ar 199	Germany	Floatplane	Trainer	1939	Production	31	
Arado Ar 231	Germany	Floatplane	Patrol	1941	Prototypes	6	
Arado SSD I	Germany	Floatplane	Fighter	1930	Prototype	1	
Arado W II	Germany	Floatplane	Trainer	1928	Prototypes	2	
Argonaut Pirate/White A-R	US	Amphibian	Private	1935	Prototypes	3	
Armstrong Whitworth Atlas	UK	Floatplane	Patrol	1925	Production	478	
ATOL 495 & 650	Finland	Amphibian	Private	1989	Prototypes	5	
Aviat Husky	US	Floatplane	Transport	1986	Production	650+	
AVIC AG600	China	Amphibian	Transport	2017	Production		
Avro Type D/R.A.F. H.R.E.3	UK	Floatplane		1911	Prototype	1	Rebuilt as Royal Aircraft Factory H.R.E.3
Avro H, 501 & 503	UK	Floatplane	Patrol	1913	Production	5	Built as Gotha WD.1
Avro 504	UK	Floatplane	Transport	1913	Production	11303	Small number used as floatplanes
Avro 552 Viper/Wright	UK	Floatplane	Trainer/Patrol	1921	Production	33	
Avro 534A Water Baby	UK	Floatplane	Racer	1919		1	
Avro type 554 Antarctic Baby	UK	Floatplane	Transport	1919	Prototype	1	
Avro 605 Avian	UK	Floatplane	Reconnaissance	1926	Production	405	
Avro 643 Cadet	UK	Floatplane	Trainer	1931	Production	104	Very few fitted with floats
Barkley-Grow T8P-1	US	Floatplane	Transport	1937	Production	11	
Bastianelli P.R.B.	Italy	Flying boat	Transport	1921	Prototype	1	
Beardmore Inverness/Rohrbach Ro IV	UK	Flying boat	Patrol	1925	Prototype	2	
Beechcraft Model 17 Staggerwing	US	Floatplane	Transport	1932	Production	785	
Beechcraft Model 18	US	Floatplane	Transport	1937	Production	9000+	
Bellanca 31-40 & 31-42 Senior Pacemaker	US	Floatplane	Transport	1935	Production	33	
Bellanca 77-320	US	Floatplane	Bomber	1934	Production	4	
Bellanca Aircruiser	US	Floatplane	Transport	1930	Production	23	
Bellanca CH-300 Pacemaker	US	Floatplane	Transport	1929	Production	35	
Bellanca CH-400 Skyrocket	US	Floatplane	Transport	1930	Production	32	
Bellanger-Denhaut 22 (HB.3)	France	Flying boat	Patrol	1920s	Production	6+	
Benoist XIV Air-Boat	US	Flying boat	Transport	1913	Prototypes	2	
Beriev Be-6	USSR	Flying boat	Patrol	1949	Production	123	
Beriev Be-8	USSR	Amphibian	Transport	1947	Prototype	2	One had hydrofoils
Beriev Be-10	USSR	Flying boat	Patrol	1956	Production	28	(Note: Jet-powered)
Beriev Be-12 Chaika	USSR	Amphibian	Patrol	1960	Production	150	
Beriev Be-40/A-40 Albatross	USSR	Amphibian	Patrol	1986	Prototype	1	
Beriev Be-103/SA-20P	Russia	Amphibian	Transport	1997	Production	23 ca.	
Beriev Be-200	Russia	Amphibian	Transport	1998	Production	17	Also a Waterbomber
Beriev KOR-1 (Be-2)	USSR	Floatplane	Patrol	1936	Production	12	
Beriev KOR-2 (Be-4)	USSR	Flying boat	Patrol	1940	Production	47	
Beriev MBR-2	USSR	Flying boat	Patrol	1931	Production	1365	
Beriev MBR-7	USSR	Flying boat	Patrol	1937	Prototype	2	
Beriev MDR-5	USSR	Flying boat	Patrol	1937	Prototype	2	
Beriev R-1	USSR	Flying boat	Patrol	1952	Prototype	1	
Bernard H.52	France	Floatplane	Fighter	1933	Prototype	2	
Bernard H.110	France	Floatplane	Fighter	1935	Prototype	1	
Bernard H.V.40	France	Floatplane	Racer	1931		1	(Note: Schneider Trophy entrant)
Bernard H.V.41	France	Floatplane	Racer	1929		1	
Bernard H.V.42	France	Floatplane	Racer	1931		3	
Bernard H.V.120	France	Floatplane	Racer	1930		2	
Bernard H.V.220	France	Floatplane	Racer		Prototype	1	Not flown
Besson H-3	France	Flying boat	Transport	1920	Prototype	1	
Besson H-5	France	Flying boat	Transport	1922	Prototype	1	
Besson H-6	France	Flying boat	Transport	1921	Prototype	1	
Besson LB	France	Flying boat	Patrol	1917			
Besson MB.26	France	Floatplane	Patrol	1925	Prototype	2 ca.	
Besson MB.35	France	Floatplane	Patrol	1926	Prototypes	2	
Besson MB.36	France	Flying boat	Transport	1930	Prototype	1	
Besson MB.410 & 411	France	Floatplane	Patrol	1932	Production	3	
Blackburn B-20	UK	Flying boat	Patrol	1940	Prototype	1	
Blackburn Dart	UK	Floatplane	Bomber	1921	Production	118	
Blackburn Iris	UK	Flying boat	Patrol	1926	Production	5	
Blackburn Nautilus	UK	Floatplane	Fighter/patrol	1929			
Blackburn Pellet	UK	Flying boat	Racer	1923		1	
Blackburn Perth	UK	Flying boat	Patrol	1934	Production	4	
Blackburn Ripon	UK	Floatplane	Bomber	1926	Production	121	
Blackburn Roc	UK	Floatplane	Bomber	1938	Prototype	1	
Blackburn Shark	UK	Floatplane	Bomber	1933	Production	269	
Blackburn Sprat	UK	Floatplane	Trainer	1926	Prototype	1	
Blackburn Sydney	UK	Flying boat	Patrol	1931	Prototype	1	
Blackburn Twin Blackburn	UK	Floatplane	Fighter	1915	Production	9	Zeppelin interceptor
Blackburn Type L	UK	Floatplane		1915	Prototype	1	
Blackburn Velos	UK	Floatplane	Patrol	1925	Production	22	
Blanchard BB-1	France	Flying boat	Racer	1924	Prototype	1	
Blanchard Brd.1	France	Flying boat	Patrol	1922	Production	24	
Blériot 290	France	Amphibian	Private	1931	Prototype	1	
Blériot 5190	France	Flying boat	Transport	1933	Prototype	1	
Blériot-SPAD S.XIV	France	Floatplane	Fighter	1917	Production	40	
Blohm & Voss BV 138	Germany	Flying boat	Patrol	1937	Production	297	
Blohm & Voss BV 222	Germany	Flying boat	Transport/Patrol	1940	Production	13	
Blohm & Voss BV 238	Germany	Flying boat	Patrol	1944	Prototype	1	
Blohm & Voss Ha 139	Germany	Floatplane	Transport	1936	Prototypes	3	
Blohm & Voss Ha 140	Germany	Floatplane	Patrol	1937	Prototypes	3	
Boeing 314 Clipper	US	Flying boat	Transport	1939	Production	12	
Boeing L-15 Scout	US	Floatplane	Patrol	1946	Production	12	
Boeing Model 1/B & W Seaplane	US	Floatplane	Transport	1916	Production	2	Copy of Martin trainer
Boeing Model 2/C-1F	US	Floatplane	Transport	1917	Prototype	1	
Boeing Model 3	US	Floatplane	Transport	1917	Production	3	
Boeing Model 5/C/C-700	US	Floatplane	Transport	1918	Production	50	
Boeing Model 6/B-1	US	Flying boat	Transport	1919	Prototype	1	
Boeing Model 6D/6E/B-1D/B-1E	US	Flying boat	Transport	1928	Production	10	
Boeing Model 7/BB-1	US	Flying boat	Transport	1920			
Boeing Model 204	US	Flying boat	Transport	1929	Production	7	
Boeing XPB-1	US	Flying boat	Patrol	1924	Prototype	1	
Boeing XPBB-1 Sea Ranger	US	Flying boat	Patrol	1942	Prototype	1	
Boeing-Canada A-213 Totem	Canada	Flying boat	Transport	1930	Prototype	1	
Bombardier CL-415	Canada	Amphibian	Waterbomber	1993	Production	95	
Borel hydro-monoplane	France	Floatplane	Racer	1912			
Borel Type Bo.11	France	Floatplane	Transport	1911	Production		
Borel-Odier Type Bo-C/B.O.20	France	Floatplane	Transport	1919	Prototype	1	
Borel-Odier Type Bo-T/B.O.2	France	Floatplane	Bomber/Transport	1916	Production	92	
Breda A.4 Idro	Italy	Floatplane	Trainer	1926	Production		
Breda A.7 Idro	Italy	Floatplane	Patrol	1929	Production	14	
Breda Ba.15H	Italy	Floatplane	Private	1928	Production		
Breda Ba.25-I	Italy	Floatplane	Trainer	1931	Production	766	
Breguet 521 & 522 Bizerte	France	Flying boat	Patrol	1933	Production	37	
Breguet 530 Saigon	France	Flying boat	Transport	1935	Production	2	
Breguet 730 & 731	France	Flying boat	Patrol	1938	Production	5	
Breguet 790 Nautilus	France	Flying boat	Patrol	1939	Prototypes	2	
Breguet S.8/2 Calcutta	France	Flying boat	Patrol	1932	Production	4	Licence-built Short Calcutta
Breguet Type V	France	Floatplane	Racer	1912			
Bristol Bolingbroke Mk.III	Canada	Floatplane	Patrol	1939	Prototype	1	
Bristol XLRQ	US	Amphibian	Transport	1943	Prototype	2	
Brun-Cottan Patrol Flying Boat	France	Flying boat	Patrol	1918	Prototype	1	
Brunner-Winkle Bird	US	Floatplane	Transport	1928	Production	240	
Budd BB-1 Pioneer	US	Flying boat	Experimental	1931	Prototype	1	
Buhl CA-6 Airsedan	US	Floatplane	Transport/Patrol	1935	Production	4	
Burgess-Dunne Hydro/Nieuport-Dunne	US	Floatplane	Trainer	1914	Prototypes	4	
Burgess HT-2 Speed Scout	US	Floatplane	Patrol	1917	Production	8	
Burgess Model I	US	Floatplane	Patrol	1913	Prototype	1	
Burgess Model K	US	Flying boat	Patrol	1913	Prototype	1	
Burgess Model L & S	US	Floatplane	Trainer	1916	Prototype		
Burgess Model U/U-2/NU-2	US	Floatplane	Trainer	1917		13	
CAMS 30	France	Flying boat	Trainer	1922	Production	31	
CAMS 31	France	Flying boat	Fighter	1922	Prototype	2	
CAMS 33	France	Flying boat	Patrol/Transport	1923	Production	21	
CAMS 36	France	Flying boat	Racer	1922	Prototype	2	
CAMS 37	France	Amphibian	Patrol/Transport	1926	Production	332	
CAMS 38	France	Flying boat	Racer	1923	Prototype	1	
CAMS 46	France	Flying boat	Trainer	1926	Production	15	
CAMS 53	France	Flying boat	Transport	1928	Production	30 ca.	
CAMS 55	France	Flying boat	Patrol	1927	Production	112	
CAMS 58	France	Flying boat	Transport	1931	Prototype	4	
Canadair CL-215	Canada	Amphibian	Waterbomber	1967	Production	125	
Canadian Vickers Vancouver	Canada	Flying boat	Patrol	1929	Production	6	
Canadian Vickers Vanessa	Canada	Floatplane	Transport	1927	Prototype	1	
Canadian Vickers Varuna	Canada	Flying boat	Patrol	1927	Production	8	
Canadian Vickers Vedette	Canada	Flying boat	Patrol	1924	Production	60	
Canadian Vickers Velos	Canada	Floatplane	Patrol	1928	Prototype	1	
Canadian Vickers Vista	Canada	Flying boat	Trainer	1927	Prototype	1	
Cañete Pirata	Spain	Flying boat	Patrol	1927	Prototype	1	
CANT 6	Italy	Flying boat	Patrol	1925	Prototype	3	
CANT 7	Italy	Flying boat	Trainer	1924	Production	34	
CANT 10	Italy	Flying boat	Transport	1925	Production	18	
CANT 18	Italy	Flying boat	Trainer	1926	Production	29	
CANT 21	Italy	Flying boat	Patrol	1927	Prototype	2	
CANT 22	Italy	Flying boat	Transport	1927	Production	10	
CANT 25	Italy	Flying boat	Fighter	1927	Production	37	
CANT Z.501 Gabbiano	Italy	Flying boat	Patrol	1934	Production	454	
CANT Z.504	Italy	Flying boat	Patrol	1934	Prototype	1	
CANT Z.505	Italy	Floatplane	Transport	1935	Prototype	1	
CANT Z.506	Italy	Floatplane	Transport/Patrol	1935	Production	356	
CANT Z.508	Italy	Flying boat	Bomber	1936	Prototype	3	
CANT Z.509	Italy	Floatplane	Transport	1937	Prototype	3	
CANT Z.511	Italy	Floatplane	Transport	1940	Prototype	2	
CANT Z.515	Italy	Floatplane	Patrol	1939	Production	11	
Caproni Ca.39	Italy	Floatplane	Bomber		Prototype		
Caproni Ca.43	Italy	Floatplane	Bomber	1917	Prototype		
Caproni Ca.47	Italy	Floatplane	Bomber			10	
Caproni Ca.60	Italy	Flying boat	Transport	1921	Prototype	1	
Caproni Ca.310 Idro/Caproni Ca.316	Italy	Floatplane	Patrol	1937	Production	14	
Caspar U.1	Germany	Floatplane	Patrol	1922	Prototypes	3	
Caudron G.3	France	Floatplane	Patrol	1913	Production		
Caudron G.4	France	Floatplane	Patrol	1913	Production	8	
Cessna 150	US	Floatplane	Transport	1967	Production		
Cessna 170	US	Floatplane	Transport	1948	Production	5174	
Cessna 172	US	Floatplane	Transport	1956	Production	44000+	
Cessna 180 Skywagon	US	Floatplane	Transport	1952	Production	6193	
Cessna 182 Skylane	US	Floatplane	Transport	1956	Production	23237+	
Cessna 185 Skywagon	US	Floatplane	Transport	1960	Production	3916	
Cessna 190	US	Floatplane	Transport	1945	Production	1180	
Cessna 206	US	Floatplane	Transport	1962	Production	8509+	
Cessna 208 Caravan	US	Floatplane	Transport	1982	Production		
Cessna T-50 Crane/Bobcat	US	Floatplane	Transport	1939	Production	5422	
Chaika L-4 & L-6	Russia	Flying boat	Private	2005	Production	14	
Chetverikov MDR-6 (Che-2)	USSR	Flying boat	Patrol	1939	Production	27	
Chetverikov SPL/OSGA-101	USSR	Flying boat	Patrol	1935	Prototypes	2	
Chetverikov TA-1	USSR	Amphibian	Transport	1947	Prototypes	3	
Claude Dornier Sea Star	Germany	Amphibian		1986	Prototypes	2	
Colonial Skimmer C-1 and C-2	US	Flying boat		1960s	Production	43	
Consolidated Commodore	US	Flying boat	Transport	1929	Production	14	
Consolidated NY	US	Floatplane	Trainer	1926	Production	302	
Consolidated P2Y	US	Flying boat	Patrol	1929	Production	78	
Consolidated PB2Y Coronado	US	Flying boat	Patrol	1937	Production	217	
Consolidated PBY Catalina	US	Flying boat	Patrol	1935	Production	3308	some versions amphibious.
Consolidated XP4Y Corregidor	US	Flying boat	Patrol	1939	Prototype	1	
Consolidated XPY-1 Admiral	US	Flying boat	Transport	1929	Prototype	1	
Convair F2Y Sea Dart	US	Flying boat	Fighter	1953	Prototype	5	hydro-skis
Convair R3Y Tradewind	US	Flying boat	Transport	1950	Production	13	
Coutant RMC 17	France	Floatplane	Patrol	1917	Production		
Curtiss CR-3 & CR-4	US	Floatplane	Racer	1923		2	
Curtiss CT-1	US	Floatplane	Bomber	1921	Prototype	1	
Curtiss H-1	US	Flying boat	Patrol	1914	Prototype	2	
Curtiss H-2	US	Flying boat	Patrol	1914	Prototype	1	
Curtiss H-4	US	Flying boat	Patrol	1916	Production	62	
Curtiss H-8	US	Flying boat	Patrol	1916	Prototype	1	
Curtiss H-12	US	Flying boat	Patrol	1916	Production	104	
Curtiss H-16	US	Flying boat	Patrol	1917	Production	336	
Curtiss HS	US	Flying boat	Patrol	1917	Production	1178 ca.	
Curtiss Model E	US	Floatplane	Racer	1911	Production		
Curtiss Model F	US	Flying boat	Transport	1912	Production	150+	
Curtiss Model K	US	Flying boat	Patrol	1915	Production	51	
Curtiss Model N	US	Floatplane	Trainer	1916	Production	560	
Curtiss Model R	US	Floatplane	Patrol	1915	Production	290 ca.	
Curtiss NC	US	Flying boat	Experimental	1919	Production	10	Trans-Atlantic
Curtiss SC Seahawk	US	Floatplane	Patrol	1944	Production	577	
Curtiss SO3C Seamew	US	Floatplane	Patrol	1939	Production	795	
Curtiss SOC Seagull	US	Floatplane	Patrol	1934	Production	322	
Curtiss-Wright CA-1 Commuter	US	Amphibian	Transport	1935	Prototypes	3	
Curtiss-Wright CW-3 Duckling	US	Flying boat	Private	1931	Prototypes	3	
Dayton-Wright FP.2	US	Floatplane	Patrol	1921	Prototype	1	
de Havilland Canada DHC-2 Beaver	Canada	Floatplane	Transport	1947	Production	1657	
de Havilland Canada DHC-3 Otter	Canada	Floatplane	Transport	1951	Production	466	
de Havilland Canada DHC-6 Twin Otter	Canada	Floatplane	Transport	1965	Production	985	
de Havilland DH.50	UK	Floatplane	Transport	1923	Production	38	
de Havilland DH.60 Moth	UK	Floatplane	Private	1925	Production	1535	
de Havilland DH.61 Giant Moth	UK	Floatplane	Transport	1927	Production	3	
de Havilland DH.83 Fox Moth	UK	Floatplane	Transport	1932	Production	155	
de Havilland DH.89 Dragon Rapide	UK	Floatplane	Transport	1934	Production	727	
de Havilland DH.90 Dragonfly	UK	Floatplane	Transport	1935	Production		
de Havilland Hornet Moth	UK	Floatplane	Transport	1934	Production		
Deperdussin Monocoque	France	Floatplane	Racer	1913	Production		
Dewoitine HD.730	France	Floatplane	Patrol	1940	Prototype		
Dewoitine HD.780	France	Floatplane	Fighter	1940	Prototype		
DFS Seeadler	Germany	Flying boat	Sailplane	1936	Prototype		
Donnet-Denhaut D.D.1	France	Flying boat	Patrol	1915	Prototype	1	
Donnet-Denhaut D.D.2	France	Flying boat	Patrol	1916	Production	401	
Donnet-Denhaut D.D.8	France	Flying boat	Patrol	1917	Production	500+	
Donnet-Denhaut D.D.9	France	Flying boat	Patrol	1918	Production	100	
Donnet-Denhaut D.D.10	France	Flying boat	Patrol	1918	Production	30	
Donnet-Denhaut P.10	France	Flying boat	Patrol	1918	Prototype	1	
Donnet-Denhaut P.15	France	Flying boat	Patrol/Transport	1919	Prototype	1	
Donnet-Lévêque Type A	France	Flying boat		1912			Also built as the FBA-Lévêque
Donnet-Lévêque Type B	France	Flying boat		1910s	Production		
Donnet-Lévêque Type C	France	Flying boat		1910s	Production		
Dornier Do 12	Germany	Amphibian	Transport	1932	Prototype	1	
Dornier Do 14	Germany	Flying boat	Experimental	1934	Prototype	1	
Dornier Do 18	Germany	Flying boat	Patrol	1935	Production	170	
Dornier Do 22	Germany	Floatplane	Transport	1938	Production	30 ca.	
Dornier Do 24 & Do 318	Germany	Flying boat	Patrol	1937	Production	279	
Dornier Do 26	Germany	Flying boat	Transport	1938	Production	6	
Dornier Do 212	Germany	Flying boat	Experimental	1942	Prototype	1	
Dornier Do A Libelle	Germany	Flying boat	Transport	1921			
Dornier Do D	Germany	Floatplane	Bomber	1924			
Dornier Do E	Germany	Flying boat	Patrol	1924	Production	4	
Dornier Do J Wal	Germany	Flying boat	Transport/Patrol	1922	Production	250+	
Dornier Do L Delphin	Germany	Flying boat	Transport	1920	Production		
Dornier Do R Super Wal	Germany	Flying boat	Transport	1926	Production		
Dornier Do S	Germany	Flying boat	Transport	1930	Prototype	1	
Dornier Do X	Germany	Flying boat	Transport	1929	Prototypes	3	
Dornier S-Ray 007	Germany	Amphibian	Private	2007	Prototype	1	
Dornier Seastar	Germany	Amphibian	Transport	1985	Prototype	2	
Douglas DF	US	Flying boat	Transport	1936	Production	4	
Douglas Dolphin	US	Amphibian	Transport	1931	Production	58	
Douglas DT	US	Floatplane	Bomber	1921	Production	90	
Douglas World Cruiser	US	Floatplane	Experimental	1923	Production	5	First flight around world, variant of DT.
Douglas PD	US	Flying boat	Patrol	1929	Prototype		
Douglas Sinbad	US	Flying boat	Transport	1930	Prototype	1	Developed into Dolphin
Douglas T2D	US	Floatplane	Bomber	1927	Production	31	
Douglas YOA-5	US	Amphibian	Patrol	1935	Prototype	1	
EAF L.33 Chelóna	Greece	Floatplane	Multi-role	1938	Prototype		
Eastman E-2 Sea Rover	US	Flying boat	Transport	1928	Production	18	
Edo OSE-1	US	Floatplane	Patrol	1946	Prototype		
EDRA Aeronautica Super Pétrel	Brazil	Amphibian	Private	2002	Production	379 ca.	
Eklund TE-1	Finland	Amphibian	Private	1949	Prototype	1	
Elias EM-1/EM-2/EO-1	US	Floatplane		1922	Production	7	
Ellison-Mahon Gweduck	US	Amphibian	Private	2009	Homebuilt		
English Electric Ayr	UK	Flying boat	Patrol	1924	Prototype		
English Electric Kingston	UK	Flying boat	Patrol	1924	Prototype		
FBA 10	France	Amphibian	Patrol	1922	Prototype		
FBA 11	France	Flying boat	Trainer	1923			
FBA 12	France	Flying boat	Trainer	1920s			
FBA 13	France	Flying boat	Trainer	1920s	Prototype	1	
FBA 16	France	Flying boat	Trainer	1920s	Prototype	1	
FBA 17	France	Flying boat	Trainer	1920s	Production	300+	
FBA 19	France	Flying boat	Bomber	1924	Production	10	
FBA 21 & 23	France	Amphibian	Transport	1925	Prototypes	5	
FBA 290	France	Flying boat	Transport	1930	Production	10	
FBA 310	France	Flying boat	Transport	1930	Production	9	
FBA Type A	France	Flying boat	Racer	1913	Prototype		
FBA Type B	France	Flying boat	Patrol	1915	Production	150+	
FBA Type C	France	Flying boat	Patrol	1910s	Production	78	
FBA Type H	France	Flying boat	Patrol	1920s	Production	2000 ca.	
FBA Type S	France	Flying boat	Patrol	1917	Production		
Fabre Hydravion	France	Floatplane	Experimental	1910	Prototype	1	
Fairchild 24	US	Floatplane	Transport	1932	Production	2232	
Fairchild 45-80 Sekani	Canada	Floatplane	Transport	1937	Prototype	2	
Fairchild 71	US	Floatplane	Transport	1926	Production		
Fairchild 82/34-42 Niska	Canada	Floatplane	Transport	1935	Production	24	
Fairchild 91 Baby Clipper	US	Amphibian	Transport	1935	Production	7	
Fairchild F-11 Husky	Canada	Floatplane	Transport	1946	Production	12	
Fairchild FB-3	US	Flying boat	Transport	1929	Prototype	1	
Fairchild FC-2	US	Floatplane	Transport	1926	Production		
Fairchild KR-34	US	Floatplane	Trainer	1928	Production	65 ca.	
Fairchild Super 71	Canada	Floatplane	Transport	1934	Production	4	
Fairey Campania	UK	Floatplane	Patrol	1917	Production	62	
Fairey Flycatcher	UK	Floatplane	Fighter	1922	Production	196	
Fairey Fremantle	UK	Floatplane	Patrol	1924	Prototype	1	
Fairey Hamble Baby	UK	Floatplane	Patrol	1917	Production	180	
Fairey III/N.10	UK	Floatplane	Patrol	1917	Production	964	
Fairey N.4	UK	Flying boat	Patrol	1923	Prototype	3	
Fairey N.9/F.127	UK	Floatplane	experimental	1918	Prototype	1	
Fairey Pintail	UK	Amphibian	Fighter/Patrol	1920	Prototype	6	
Fairey S.9/30	UK	Floatplane	Bomber	1934	Prototype	1	
Fairey Seafox	UK	Floatplane	Patrol	1936	Production	66	
Fairey Seal	UK	Floatplane	Patrol	1930	Production	91	
Fairey Swordfish	UK	Floatplane	Bomber	1934	Production	2391	
Farman F.50 & F.51	France	Flying boat	Patrol	1922	Prototype	2 ca.	
Farman F.60 Torp	France	Floatplane	Bomber	1920s	Production		
Farman F.166, 167 & 168	France	Floatplane	Bomber	1928	Production		
Farman F.271	France	Floatplane	Bomber	1934	Production		
Farman HF.22	France	Floatplane	Trainer	1913	Production		
Farman HF.23	France	Floatplane	Trainer	1913	Production	16	
Farman NC.470 & 471	France	Floatplane	Patrol	1938	Prototype		
Felixstowe F.1	UK	Flying boat	Patrol	1916	Prototype		
Felixstowe F.2 & F.2A	UK	Flying boat	Patrol	1917	Production		
Felixstowe F.3	UK	Flying boat	Patrol	1917	Production	182	
Felixstowe F.4 Fury	UK	Flying boat	Patrol	1918	Prototype	1	
Felixstowe F.5 & F.5L	UK	Flying boat	Patrol	1918	Production	390	
Felixstowe Porte Baby	UK	Flying boat	Patrol	1916	Prototype	1	
Fiat C.29	Italy	Floatplane	Racer	1929		3	
Fiat CR.20 Idro	Italy	Floatplane	Fighter	1926	Production		
Fiat RS.14	Italy	Floatplane	Patrol	1939	Production	188	
Fizir AF-2	Yugoslavia	Flying boat	Private	1930	Prototype	1	
Fizir F1M	Yugoslavia	Floatplane	Patrol	1930	Production	5	Development of F1V landplane
Fizir FN-H	Yugoslavia	Floatplane	Trainer	1931	Production		
Fleet 50 Freighter	Canada	Floatplane	Transport	1938	Production	5	
Fleet 80 Canuck	Canada	Floatplane	Transport	1945	Production	225	
Fleetwings Seabird	US	Amphibian		1937	Production	6	
Flygfabriken LN-3 Seagull	Sweden	Amphibian	Private	2008	Prototype		
FlyNano Nano	Finland	Flying boat	Private	2012	Prototype	1	
Focke-Wulf FW 58BW	Germany	Floatplane	Trainer	1935	Prototype	1	
Focke-Wulf Fw 62	Germany	Floatplane	Patrol	1937	Prototypes	4	
Fokker B.I & B.III	Netherlands	Flying boat	Patrol	1922	Prototype		
Fokker B.II	Netherlands	Flying boat	Patrol	1923	Prototype		
Fokker C.VII-W	Netherlands	Floatplane	Patrol	1928	Production	30	
Fokker C.VIII	Netherlands	Floatplane	Patrol	1928	Production	10	
Fokker C.XI-W	Netherlands	Floatplane	Patrol	1935	Production	14	
Fokker C.XIV-W	Netherlands	Floatplane	Patrol	1937	Production		
Fokker F.VII	Netherlands	Floatplane	Transport	1924	Production		
Fokker F.11/B.IV	Netherlands	Flying boat	Transport	1928	Prototype	6	
Fokker Super Universal	US	Floatplane	Transport	1928	Production	200	
Fokker T.II	Netherlands	Floatplane	Bomber	1921	Prototypes	3	
Fokker T.III	Netherlands	Floatplane		1920s	Production		
Fokker T.IV	Netherlands	Floatplane	Bomber	1927	Production		
Fokker T.VIII	Netherlands	Floatplane	Bomber	1939	Production	36	
Fokker Universal	US	Floatplane	Transport	1926	Production	44	
Fokker W.3	Netherlands	Floatplane	Patrol	1915	Prototype		
Ford Trimotor	US	Floatplane	Transport	1926			
Found Centennial	Canada	Floatplane	Transport	1967	Production		
Found FBA-1	Canada	Floatplane	Transport	1949			
Found FBA-2	Canada	Floatplane	Transport	1960			
Friedrichshafen FF.29	Germany	Floatplane	Patrol	1914	Production	44	
Friedrichshafen FF.31	Germany	Floatplane	Patrol	1915		2	
Friedrichshafen FF.33	Germany	Floatplane	Patrol	1914			
Friedrichshafen FF.34	Germany	Floatplane		1916			
Friedrichshafen FF.35	Germany	Floatplane	Bomber	1916			
Friedrichshafen FF.37	Germany	Floatplane		1910s			
Friedrichshafen FF.39	Germany	Floatplane	Patrol	1910s			
Friedrichshafen FF.40	Germany	Floatplane		1916	Prototype	1	
Friedrichshafen FF.41	Germany	Floatplane	Bomber	1916			
Friedrichshafen FF.43	Germany	Floatplane	Fighter	1916	Prototype	1	
Friedrichshafen FF.44	Germany	Floatplane	Patrol	1917	Prototype	1	
Friedrichshafen FF.48	Germany	Floatplane		1917		3	
Friedrichshafen FF.49	Germany	Floatplane	Patrol	1917	Production	240	
Friedrichshafen FF.53	Germany	Floatplane	Bomber	1918		3	
Friedrichshafen FF.59	Germany	Floatplane	Patrol	1914	Production	315	
GAF Nomad	Australia	Floatplane	Transport	1971	Production		
Gallaudet D-4	US	Floatplane	Patrol	1918	Prototype		
General Aeroplane Verville	US	Flying boat		1916	Prototype		
General Aeroplane Gamma S	US	Floatplane		1916	Prototype		
General Aviation PJ	US	Flying boat	Patrol	1931	Production		
Gidroplan Che-22 Korvet	Russia	Flying boat	Homebuilt	1993			
Gloster Goring	UK	Floatplane	Bomber	1927	Prototype	1	
Gloster II	UK	Floatplane	Racer	1924			
Gloster III	UK	Floatplane	Racer	1925			
Gloster IV	UK	Floatplane	Racer	1927			
Gloster VI	UK	Floatplane	Racer	1929			
Goodyear Drake	US	Amphibian	Transport	1950	Prototype	2	
Goodyear GA-2 Duck	US	Amphibian	Transport	1944	Production	19	
Gotha WD.1	Germany	Floatplane	Patrol	1910s	Production		Licensed Avro 501
Gotha WD.2	Germany	Floatplane	Patrol	1910s			
Gotha WD.3	Germany	Floatplane	Fighter	1910s			
Gotha WD.5	Germany	Floatplane	Patrol	1910s			
Gotha WD.7	Germany	Floatplane		1910s			
Gotha WD.9	Germany	Floatplane	Patrol	1910s			
Gotha WD.11	Germany	Floatplane		1910s			
Gotha WD.12	Germany	Floatplane		1910s			
Gotha WD.13	Germany	Floatplane	Patrol	1917			
Gotha WD.14	Germany	Floatplane	Bomber	1910s			
Gotha WD.15	Germany	Floatplane	Patrol	1917			
Gotha WD.20	Germany	Floatplane	Patrol	1910s			
Gotha WD.22	Germany	Floatplane	Patrol	1910s			
Gotha WD.27	Germany	Floatplane	Patrol	1910s			
Gourdou-Leseurre LGL.32	France	Floatplane	Fighter	1930s			
Gourdou 120 HY	France	Floatplane	Patrol	1930s	Prototype		
Gourdou-Leseurre GL.710	France	Flying boat	Transport	1934	Prototype		
Gourdou-Leseurre GL-832 HY	France	Floatplane	Patrol	1930s	Prototype		
Gourdou-Leseurre L.2 & GL.810	France	Floatplane	Patrol	1926	Prototype		GL-813 HY.
Gourdou-Leseurre M.2	France	Flying boat	Patrol	1926	Prototype		
Great Lakes XSG	US	Amphibian	Patrol	1931	Prototype		
Grigorovich GASN	Russia	Floatplane	Bomber	1917	Prototype		
Grigorovich M-1	Russia	Flying boat	Private	1913	Prototype	1	
Grigorovich M-2	Russia	Flying boat		1914			
Grigorovich M-3	Russia	Flying boat		1914			
Grigorovich M-4	Russia	Flying boat	Patrol	1914			
Grigorovich M-5, M-6 M-7 & M-8	Russia	Flying boat	Patrol	1915			
Grigorovich M-9	Russia	Flying boat	Patrol	1915			
Grigorovich M-10	Russia	Flying boat	Patrol	1916			
Grigorovich M-11	Russia	Flying boat	Fighter	1916			
Grigorovich M-12	Russia	Flying boat	Fighter	1910s			
Grigorovich M-15	Russia	Flying boat	Patrol	1916			
Grigorovich M-16	Russia	Floatplane	Patrol	1916			
Grigorovich M-19	Russia	Flying boat	Patrol	1918			
Grigorovich M-20	Russia	Flying boat	Patrol	1916			
Grigorovich M-23 & M-23bis	USSR	Flying boat	Patrol	1923			
Grigorovich M-24 & M-24bis	USSR	Flying boat	Patrol	1922			
Grigorovich MK-1	Russia	Flying boat	Patrol	1916			
Grumman Albatross	US	Amphibian	Transport	1947	Production	466	
Grumman JF & J2F Duck	US	Amphibian	Patrol	1933	Production	632	
Grumman Goose	US	Amphibian	Transport	1937	Production	345	
Grumman Mallard	US	Amphibian	Transport	1946	Production	59	
Grumman Tadpole	US	Amphibian	Transport	1944	Prototype	1	
Grumman Widgeon	US	Amphibian	Transport	1940	Production	317	Also built as SCAN 30
Hall Air Yacht	US	Flying boat	Private	1923	Prototype	1	
Hall PH	US	Flying boat	Patrol	1931	Production	24	
Hall XP2H	US	Flying boat	Patrol	1932	Prototype	1	
Hall XPTBH	US	Floatplane	Bomber	1937	Prototype	1	
Hamble River H.L.1 Seaplane	UK	Floatplane		1914	Prototype		
Hamilton H-47	US	Floatplane	Transport	1928	Production		
Handley Page HP.14 or R/200	UK	Floatplane	Patrol	1917	Prototype	3	
Hanriot HD.2	France	Floatplane	Fighter	1918	Production		
Hansa-Brandenburg CC	Germany	Flying boat	Fighter	1916	Production		
Hansa-Brandenburg GDW	Germany	Floatplane	Bomber	1916			
Hansa-Brandenburg GNW	Germany	Floatplane	Patrol	1914			
Hansa-Brandenburg GW	Germany	Floatplane	Bomber	1916			
Hansa-Brandenburg KDW	Germany	Floatplane	Fighter	1916	Production	58	
Hansa-Brandenburg NW	Germany	Floatplane	Patrol	1914	Production	77	
Hansa-Brandenburg W	Germany	Floatplane	Patrol	1914			
Hansa-Brandenburg W.11	Germany	Floatplane	Fighter	1917	Prototype	3	
Hansa-Brandenburg W.12	Germany	Floatplane	Fighter	1917	Production	181	
Hansa-Brandenburg W.13	Germany	Flying boat	Bomber	1917	Production	130	
Hansa-Brandenburg W.19	Germany	Floatplane	Fighter	1918	Production	55	
Hansa-Brandenburg W.20	Germany	Flying boat	Patrol	1918	Prototype	3	
Hansa-Brandenburg W.25	Germany	Floatplane	Fighter	1917	Prototype	1	
Hansa-Brandenburg W.27	Germany	Floatplane	Fighter	1918	Prototype	1	
Hansa-Brandenburg W.29	Germany	Floatplane	Fighter	1918	Production	78	
Hansa-Brandenburg W.32	Germany	Floatplane	Fighter	1918	Prototype	1	
Hansa-Brandenburg W.33	Germany	Floatplane	Fighter	1918	Production	491	
Harbin SH-5	China	Amphibian	Patrol	1976	Prototype		
Hawker Dantorp	UK	Floatplane	Bomber	1925	Prototypes	2	
Hawker Hind	UK	Floatplane	Trainer	1934	Production		2 for Portugal
Hawker Osprey	UK	Floatplane	Fighter-Patrol	1930	Production	103	
Heinkel HD 9	Germany	Floatplane		1928			
Heinkel HD 14	Germany	Floatplane	Bomber	1925	Prototype	1	
Heinkel HD 16	Germany	Floatplane	Bomber	1928			
Heinkel HD 18	Germany	Floatplane	Transport	1925			
Heinkel HE 1	Germany	Floatplane	Patrol	1921			
Heinkel HE 2	Germany	Floatplane	Patrol	1923			
Heinkel HE 3	Germany	Floatplane	Private	1923			
Heinkel HE 4	Germany	Floatplane		1926			
Heinkel HE 5	Germany	Floatplane	Patrol	1926			
Heinkel HE 8	Germany	Floatplane	Patrol	1927			
Heinkel HE 12	Germany	Floatplane	Transport	1929	Prototype	1	
Heinkel HE 24	Germany	Floatplane	Trainer	1926			
Heinkel HE 25	Germany	Floatplane	Fighter	1925			
Heinkel HE 26	Germany	Floatplane	Fighter	1925			
Heinkel HE 31	Germany	Floatplane	Patrol	1927			
Heinkel HE 42	Germany	Floatplane		1931			
Heinkel He 50aW	Germany	Floatplane	Bomber	1931	Prototype	1	
Heinkel He 51	Germany	Floatplane	Fighter	1933			
Heinkel He 55	Germany	Flying boat	Patrol	1929			
Heinkel He 56	Germany	Floatplane	Patrol	1929			
Heinkel He 57	Germany	Amphibian	Transport	1929			
Heinkel He 58	Germany	Floatplane	Transport	1932	Prototype	1	
Heinkel He 59	Germany	Floatplane	Patrol	1931	Production	142	
Heinkel He 60	Germany	Floatplane	Patrol	1933	Production	361	
Heinkel He 62	Germany	Floatplane	Patrol	1932			
Heinkel He 114	Germany	Floatplane	Patrol	1936	Production		
Heinkel He 115	Germany	Floatplane	Patrol	1936	Production	138	
Heinkel He 119	Germany	Floatplane	Patrol	1936	Prototype		
Helio Courier	US	Floatplane	Transport	1949	Production		
Hiro H1H	Japan	Flying boat	Patrol	1920s	Production	65	
Hiro H2H	Japan	Flying boat	Patrol	1930	Production	17	
Hiro H4H	Japan	Flying boat	Patrol	1931	Production	47	
Hopfner HA-11/33	Austria	Amphibian		1933	Prototype		
Howard DGA-15	US	Floatplane	Transport	1939	Production		
Huff-Daland HN	US	Floatplane	Trainer	1920s	Prototype		
Hughes H-4 Hercules	US	Flying boat	Transport	1947	Prototype	1	
IAR-818H	Romania	Floatplane	Transport	1964	Prototype		
ICON A5	US	Amphibian		2008	Private		
Ikarus IM	Yugoslavia	Flying boat	Transport	1920s			
Ikarus IO	Yugoslavia	Flying boat	Transport	1927			
Ikarus Kurir H	Yugoslavia	Floatplane	Patrol	1957			
Ikarus ŠM	Yugoslavia	Flying boat		1924	Production	42	
IMAM Ro.43	Italy	Floatplane	Patrol	1935	Production	193	
IMAM Ro.44	Italy	Floatplane	Fighter	1936	Production	35	
Independent Aircraft Sea Dragon	US	Amphibian	Private		Homebuilt		
Ireland Neptune	US	Amphibian	Private	1927	Production	56	
Ireland Privateer	US	Amphibian	Private	1930	Production	18	
Island X-199 Spectra	US	Flying boat	Private	1969	Prototype		
IVL A.22 Hansa	Finland	Floatplane	Patrol	1922	Production	120	
Junkers A 20 / Ju 20	Germany	Floatplane	Patrol	1923	Production		
Junkers F.13	Germany	Floatplane	Transport	1919	Production		
Junkers G 24	Germany	Floatplane	Transport	1924	Production		
Junkers Ju 46	Germany	Floatplane	Transport	1932	Production	5	
Junkers Ju 52	Germany	Floatplane	Transport/Bomber	1930	Production		
Junkers W 33	Germany	Floatplane	Transport	1926	Production		
Junkers W 34	Germany	Floatplane	Transport	1926	Production		
Kawanishi E5K	Japan	Floatplane	Patrol	1931	Prototype	20	
Kawanishi E7K	Japan	Floatplane	Patrol	1933	Production	533	
Kawanishi E15K Shiun	Japan	Floatplane	Patrol	1941	Production	15	
Kawanishi H3K	Japan	Flying boat	Patrol	1931		5	
Kawanishi H6K	Japan	Flying boat	Patrol/transport	1936	Production	215	
Kawanishi H8K	Japan	Flying boat	Patrol/transport	1940	Production	167	
Kawanishi K-7	Japan	Floatplane	Transport	1924	Production	11	
Kawanishi K8K	Japan	Floatplane	Trainer	1938	Production	15	
Kawanishi N1K1 Kyofu	Japan	Floatplane	Fighter	1942	Production	97	
Keystone Air Yacht	US	Amphibian	Transport	1930	Production	4	
Keystone PK	US	Flying boat	Patrol	1930	Production		
Kirkham-Williams X	US	Floatplane	Racer	1927		1	
Klemm Kl 35bW	Germany	Floatplane	Trainer		Production		
Lake LA-4 Amphibian, Buccaneer and EP	US	Amphibian		1960	Production		
Lakes Hydro-monoplane	UK	Floatplane		1913	Prototype		
Lakes Seabird	UK	Floatplane		1912	Prototype		
Lakes Waterbird	UK	Floatplane		1911	Prototype		
Lakes Waterhen	UK	Floatplane		1912	Prototype		
Latécoère 15	France	Floatplane		1924			
Latécoère 21	France	Flying boat		1926			
Latécoère 21	France	Flying boat		1927			
Latécoère 32	France	Flying boat	Transport	1928			
Latécoère 34	France	Flying boat	Transport	1930			
Latécoère 44	France	Floatplane	Bomber	1931			
Latécoère 50	France	Flying boat		1931			
Latécoère 225	France	Amphibian		1984	Prototype	1	In museum in Biscarrosse
Latécoère 290, 293, 294 & 296	France	Floatplane	Bomber	1931	Production	35	
Latécoère 298	France	Floatplane	Patrol	1936	Production	121	
Latécoère 300, 301 & 302	France	Flying boat		1931	Production	7	
Latécoère 380 & 381	France	Flying boat		1930			
Latécoère 501	France	Flying boat		1932			
Latécoère 521	France	Flying boat	Transport	1935			
Latécoère 522	France	Flying boat	Transport	1935			
Latécoère 523	France	Flying boat	Transport	1935			
Latécoère 550	France	Floatplane	Bomber	1934			
Latécoère 582	France	Flying boat	Patrol	1935			
Latécoère 611	France	Flying boat	Bomber	1939			
Latécoère 631	France	Flying boat	Transport	1942			
Latham 42	France	Flying boat	Bomber	1924			
Latham 43	France	Flying boat	Patrol	1924	Production	28	
Latham 45	France	Flying boat		1920s			
Latham 47	France	Flying boat	Patrol	1928	Production	16	
Latham 230	France	Floatplane	Patrol	1928		1	
Latham C.1	France	Flying boat	Bomber	1923			
Latham HB.5	France	Flying boat	Patrol	1921	Production	10	
Latham L.1	France	Flying boat	Racer	1923			
Latham L.2	France	Flying boat	Racer	1923			
Letov Š-328.v	Czechoslovakia	Floatplane	Patrol	1936		4	
Levasseur PL.14	France	Floatplane	Bomber	1929			
Levasseur PL.15	France	Floatplane	Bomber	1929	Production	17	
Levasseur PL.200	France	Floatplane	Patrol	1935			
Levy G.L.40	France	Flying boat	Patrol	1917			
LFG Stralsund V 19 Putbus	Germany	Floatplane		1918	Prototype	1	
LFG W1 or W	Germany	Floatplane		1916			Navalized Albatros C.Ia
LFG WD or W	Germany	Floatplane		1917			
Lioré et Olivier LeO H-242	France	Flying boat	Transport	1929		15	
Lioré et Olivier LeO H-10	France	Floatplane	Patrol	1923			
Lioré et Olivier LeO H-13	France	Flying boat		1922	Production	53	
Lioré et Olivier LeO H-18	France	Flying boat		1928			
Lioré et Olivier LeO H-22	France	Flying boat	Transport	1931			
Lioré et Olivier LeO H-23	France	Amphibian	Patrol	1930			
Lioré et Olivier LeO H-24	France	Flying boat	Transport	1929			
Lioré et Olivier LeO 25	France	Floatplane	Bomber	1928			
Lioré et Olivier LeO H-27	France	Flying boat	Transport	1930			
Lioré et Olivier LeO H-43	France	Floatplane	Patrol	1934	Production	21	
Lioré et Olivier LeO H-46	France	Floatplane	Patrol	1936			
Lioré et Olivier LeO H-47	France	Flying boat	Transport	1936	Production	6	
Lioré et Olivier LeO H-49	France	Flying boat	Transport	1942			
Lioré et Olivier LeO H-190	France	Flying boat		1926	Production	45	
Lioré et Olivier LeO H-246	France	Flying boat	Transport	1937			
LISA Akoya	France	Flying boat	Private	2011			Hydrofoil
Lockwood Aircam	US	Floatplane	Private	1995	Homebuilt		
Loening 1911	US	Flying boat		1911	Prototype		
Loening Amphibian	US	Amphibian		1923	Prototype		
Loening C-1	US	Amphibian	Transport	1928	Production	8	
Loening C-2 Air yacht	US	Amphibian	Transport	1928	Production		
Keystone-Loening Air Yacht	US	Amphibian	Transport	1928	Production	2	
Loening C-5	US	Amphibian	Transport	1934	Prototype	1	
Keystone–Loening Commuter	US	Amphibian	Transport	1929	Production	31	
Loening Duckling	US	Flying boat	Experimental	1918	Prototype	1	
Loening M-2 Kitten	US	Floatplane	Patrol	1918	Prototypes	3	
Loening M-3	US	Floatplane	Patrol	1919	Prototype	1	
Loening M-81-S and LS	US	Floatplane	Fighter	1918			
Loening Model 23 Air yacht	US	Flying boat	Transport	1922			
Loening Monoduck	US	Flying boat	Transport	1934	Prototype	1	
Loening OL & variants	US	Amphibian	Patrol	1923	Production		
Loening S-1 Air Yacht	US	Flying boat	Transport	1922			
Loening SL	US	Flying boat	Patrol	1931	Prototype	1	
Loening XS2L	US	Flying boat	Patrol	1933	Prototype	1	
Lohner E	Austria-Hungary	Flying boat	Patrol	1914			
Lohner L & S	Austria-Hungary	Flying boat	Patrol	1915	Production		
Lohner R	Austria-Hungary	Flying boat	Patrol	1910s	Production		
Loire 50	France	Flying boat	Transport	1931	Production	7	
Loire 60	France	Flying boat	Transport	1932			
Loire 70	France	Flying boat	Patrol	1933	Production		
Loire 102 Bretagne	France	Flying boat	Transport	1936			
Loire 130	France	Flying boat	Transport	1934	Production	125	
Loire 210	France	Floatplane	Fighter	1935	Production	21	
Loire-Nieuport LN.10	France	Floatplane		1939			
Lübeck-Travemünde F.1	Germany	Floatplane		1914			
Lübeck-Travemünde F.2	Germany	Floatplane		1917			
Lübeck-Travemünde F.4	Germany	Floatplane		1917			
Lublin R-VIII	Poland	Floatplane	Patrol	1930s		3	
Lublin R-XIII	Poland	Floatplane	Patrol	1930s		20	
Macchi L.1	Italy	Flying boat	Patrol	1915			
Macchi L.2	Italy	Flying boat	Patrol	1916		10	
Macchi L.3/M.3	Italy	Flying boat	Patrol	1916	Production	200	
Macchi M.4	Italy	Flying boat	Patrol	1917	Prototype	2	
Macchi M.5	Italy	Flying boat	Fighter	1917	Production	244	
Macchi M.6	Italy	Flying boat	Fighter	1917	Prototype	1	
Macchi M.7	Italy	Flying boat	Fighter	1918	Production	100+	
Macchi M.8	Italy	Flying boat	Patrol	1917	Production	57	
Macchi M.9	Italy	Flying boat	Patrol	1918	Production	30 ca.	
Macchi M.12	Italy	Flying boat	Bomber	1918	Production	10 ca.	
Macchi M.17	Italy	Flying boat	Racer	1919			
Macchi M.18	Italy	Flying boat	Patrol	1928			
Macchi M.19	Italy	Flying boat	Racer	1920			
Macchi M.24	Italy	Flying boat	Patrol	1923			
Macchi M.26	Italy	Flying boat	Fighter	1924			
Macchi M.33	Italy	Flying boat	Racer	1925	Prototypes	2	
Macchi M.39	Italy	Floatplane	Racer	1926	Production	5	
Macchi M.40	Italy	Floatplane	Patrol	1928			
Macchi M.41	Italy	Flying boat	Fighter	1927			
Macchi M.52	Italy	Floatplane	Racer	1927			
Macchi M.53	Italy	Floatplane	Patrol	1928			
Macchi M.67	Italy	Floatplane	Racer	1928		3	
Macchi M.70	Italy	Floatplane	Private	1929			
Macchi M.71	Italy	Flying boat	Fighter	1930			
Macchi M.C.72	Italy	Floatplane	Racer	1931			
Macchi M.C.73 Idro	Italy	Floatplane	Trainer	1931			
Macchi M.C.77	Italy	Flying boat	Patrol	1935			
Macchi M.C.94	Italy	Flying boat	Transport	1935	Production	12	
Macchi M.C.99	Italy	Flying boat	Patrol	1937	Prototype	1	
Macchi M.C.100	Italy	Flying boat	Transport	1939			
Mann Egerton Type B	UK	Floatplane	Patrol	1915	Production	15	
Marinens Flyvebaatfabrikk M.F.1	Norway	Floatplane	Patrol	1915	Production	5	
Marinens Flyvebaatfabrikk M.F.2	Norway	Floatplane	Patrol	1916	Production	3	
Marinens Flyvebaatfabrikk M.F.3	Norway	Floatplane	Patrol	1917	Production	4	
Marinens Flyvebaatfabrikk M.F.4	Norway	Floatplane	Trainer	1918	Production	6	
Marinens Flyvebaatfabrikk M.F.5	Norway	Floatplane	Patrol	1919	Production	9	
Marinens Flyvebaatfabrikk M.F.6	Norway	Floatplane	Trainer	1921		2	
Marinens Flyvebaatfabrikk M.F.7	Norway	Floatplane	Trainer	1923		2	
Marinens Flyvebaatfabrikk M.F.8	Norway	Floatplane	Trainer	1924	Production	8	
Marinens Flyvebaatfabrikk M.F.9	Norway	Floatplane	Fighter	1925	Production	10	
Marinens Flyvebaatfabrikk M.F.10	Norway	Floatplane	Trainer	1929	Production	4	
Marinens Flyvebaatfabrikk M.F.11	Norway	Floatplane	Patrol	1932	Production	29	
Marinens Flyvebaatfabrikk M.F.12	Norway	Floatplane	Trainer	1939	Prototype	1	
Martin 130	US	Flying boat	Transport	1935	Production	3	
Martin 156	US	Flying boat	Transport	1937	Prototype	1	
Martin Mars	US	Flying boat	Transport	1942	Production	7	also used as waterbomber
Martin MO	US	Floatplane	Patrol	1924	Production	36	
Martin P2M	US	Flying boat	Transport	1929	Production	78	
Martin P3M	US	Flying boat	Patrol	1920s	Production	10	
Martin P5M Marlin	US	Flying boat	Patrol	1948	Production	285	
Martin P6M SeaMaster	US	Flying boat	Transport/Patrol	1955			
Martin PBM Mariner	US	Flying boat	Patrol	1939	Production	1366	
Martinsyde F6	UK	Floatplane	Transport	1918	Prototype		
Maule M-1	US	Floatplane		1932	Production		
Microleve Corsario	Brazil	Amphibian	Private	1988			
Militi M.B.1	Italy	Flying boat	Private	1967	Homebuilt		Glider
Militi M.B.2 Leonardo	Italy	Flying boat		1970	Homebuilt		
Mitsubishi F1M	Japan	Floatplane	Patrol	1936	Production	944	
Morane-Saulnier G	France	Floatplane	Racer	1912			
Murphy Moose	Canada	Floatplane	Transport	1990	Production		
Murphy Rebel	Canada	Floatplane	Transport	1990	Production		
Nakajima A6M2-N	Japan	Floatplane	Fighter	1942	Production	327	
Nakajima E2N	Japan	Floatplane	Patrol	1929	Production	80	
Nakajima E4N	Japan	Floatplane	Patrol	1930	Production	153	
Nakajima E8N	Japan	Floatplane	Patrol	1934	Production	755	
Nardi F.N.333 Riviera	Italy	Amphibian	Transport	1952	Production	29	
Naval Air Establishment Chiang Hung	China	Floatplane	Transport	1931	Prototype		
Naval Aircraft Factory N3N Canary	US	Floatplane	Trainer	1935	Production	997	
Naval Aircraft Factory PN	US	Flying boat	Patrol	1918	Production		
Naval Aircraft Factory PT	US	Floatplane	Bomber	1922			
Naval Aircraft Factory TF	US	Flying boat	Fighter	1920			
Naval Aircraft Factory TG	US	Floatplane	Trainer	1922			
Naval Aircraft Factory TR-2	US	Floatplane	Trainer	1923			
Naval Aircraft Factory TS	US	Floatplane	Fighter	1922	Production	46	
Navy-Wright NW-2	US	Floatplane	Racer	1923		1	
Nieuport IV.H	France	Floatplane	Racer	1912	Production		
Nieuport VI.H	France	Floatplane	Racer/Reconnaissance	1913	Production		
Nieuport X.H	France	Floatplane	Reconnaissance	1913	Production		
Nieuport-Delage Ni-D 29 H	France	Floatplane	Racer	1919			
Nieuport-Delage NiD 43	France	Floatplane	Fighter	1924	Prototype	1	
Nieuport-Delage NiD 450, 650, 651 and 652	France	Floatplane	Racer	1930			
Noorduyn Norseman	Canada	Floatplane	Transport	1935	Production	904	
Nord 1400, 1401 and 1402 Noroit	France	Flying boat	Patrol	1949			
Nordic Omsider	Norway	Amphibian		2010s			
Norman Thompson N.1B	UK	Flying boat	Patrol	1917	Prototype		
Norman Thompson N.2C	UK	Flying boat		1918			
Norman Thompson N.T.2B	UK	Flying boat	Trainer	1917			
Norman Thompson N.T.4	UK	Flying boat	Patrol	1916		72	
Norsk Flyindustri Finnmark 5A	Norway	Amphibian	Transport	1949	Prototype	1	
Northrop Delta	US	Floatplane	Patrol/Transport	1933	Production	32	
Northrop Gamma	US	Floatplane	Transport	1932	Production	60	
Northrop N-3PB	US	Floatplane	Bomber	1940	Production	24	
Oeffag G	Austria-Hungary	Flying boat	Patrol	1916			
Oertz FB 3	Germany	Flying boat	Private	1913	Prototype	1	
Oertz W 4	Germany	Flying boat	Patrol	1914		2	
Oertz W 5	Germany	Flying boat	Patrol	1916		5	
Oertz W 6 Flugschoner	Germany	Flying boat	Patrol		Prototype	1	
Oertz W 7	Germany	Flying boat	Patrol			2	
Oertz W 8	Germany	Flying boat	Patrol		Prototype	1	
Osprey Osprey 2	US	Amphibian	Private	1973	Homebuilt		
Osprey Osprey I	US	Amphibian		1970	Homebuilt		
Parnall Perch	UK	Floatplane	Trainer	1926	Prototype	1	
Parnall Peto	UK	Floatplane	Patrol	1926	Prototype	2	
Parnall Pike	UK	Floatplane	Patrol	1927	Prototype	1	
Parnall Pipit	UK	Floatplane	Fighter	1928	Prototype	2	
Parnall Plover	UK	Amphibian	Fighter	1922	Prototype		
Parnall Prawn	UK	Flying boat	Fighter	1930	Prototype	1	
Parnall Puffin	UK	Amphibian	Fighter-Patrol	1920	Prototype	3	
Percheron 18	France	Floatplane	Patrol		Prototype		
Percival Proctor 6	UK	Floatplane	Transport	1946	Production		
Phoenix Cork	UK	Flying boat	Patrol	1918	Prototype		
Piaggio P.6	Italy	Floatplane	Patrol	1927	Prototype		
Piaggio P.7	Italy	Flying boat	Racer	1929	Prototype	1	Hydrofoil, Not flown
Piaggio P.8	Italy	Floatplane		1928	Prototype		
Piaggio P.136	Italy	Amphibian	Transport	1948	Production	63	
Piper J-3 Cub	US	Floatplane	Transport	1938	Production		
Piper PA-12 Super Cruiser	US	Floatplane	Transport	1944	Production		
Piper PA-18 Super Cub	US	Floatplane	Transport	1949	Production		
Piper PA-20 Pacer	US	Floatplane	Transport	1949	Production		
Piper PA-23 Apache	US	Floatplane	Transport	1952	Production		
Polaris AM-FIB	Italy	Amphibian	Private	1986			
Polikarpov MR-1	USSR	Floatplane	Patrol	1918	Production		
Port Victoria P.V.1	UK	Floatplane	Fighter	1916	Prototype		
Port Victoria P.V.2	UK	Floatplane	Fighter	1916	Prototype		
Port Victoria P.V.4	UK	Floatplane	Patrol	1917	Prototype		
Port Victoria P.V.5	UK	Floatplane	Fighter	1917	Prototype		
Port Victoria P.V.9	UK	Floatplane	Fighter	1917	Prototype		
Potez 450	France	Flying boat	Fighter	1932	Production	16	
Potez-CAMS 141	France	Flying boat	Patrol	1938			
Potez-CAMS 161	France	Flying boat	Transport	1939			
Privateer Industries Privateer	US	Floatplane	Transport	2018	Prototype	1	
Progressive Aerodyne Searey	US	Amphibian	Private	1990s	Homebuilt		
Progressive Aerodyne Stingray	US	Amphibian	Private	1990s	Homebuilt		
Quest Kodiak	US	Floatplane	Private	2010	Production		
RAS-1 Getta	Romania	Flying boat	Trainer	1925	Prototype		
Republic RC-3 Seabee	US	Amphibian		1945	Production	1060	
RKIIGA-74 Experiment	USSR	Flying boat	Homebuilt	1974	Prototype1		
Rocheville/EMSCO Arctic Tern	US	Floatplane	Exploration	1932	Experimental	1	
Rogožarski PVT	Yugoslavia	Floatplane	Trainer	1934			
Rogožarski SIM-XII-H	Yugoslavia	Floatplane	Trainer	1936			
Rogožarski SIM-XIV-H	Yugoslavia	Floatplane	Patrol	1940			
Rohrbach Ro II	Germany	Flying boat	Transport	1923	Prototype	1	
Rohrbach Ro III	Germany	Flying boat	Transport	1924	Production	6+	
Rohrbach Ro IV	Germany	Flying boat	Transport	1925	Prototype	2	
Rohrbach Ro V Rocco	Germany	Flying boat	Transport	1927	Prototype	1	
Rohrbach Ro VII Robbe	Germany	Flying boat	Transport/Patrol	1926	Production	3	
Rohrbach Ro X Romar	Germany	Flying boat	Transport	1928	Production	4	
Royal Aircraft Factory C.E.1	UK	Flying boat	Patrol	1918	Prototype		
Rumpler 4B 11	Germany	Floatplane	Patrol	1914			
Rumpler 4B 12	Germany	Floatplane	Patrol	1914	Production		
Saab S 17BS	Sweden	Floatplane	Reconnaissance	1940	Production	38	
Sablatnig SF-1	Germany	Floatplane	Patrol	1917	Prototype		
Sablatnig SF-2	Germany	Floatplane	Patrol	1916	Prototype		
Sablatnig SF-3	Germany	Floatplane	Fighter	1917	Prototype		
Sablatnig SF-4	Germany	Floatplane	Fighter	1917	Prototype		
Sablatnig SF-5	Germany	Floatplane	Patrol	1917			
Sablatnig SF-7	Germany	Floatplane	Fighter	1917	Prototype		
Sablatnig SF-8	Germany	Floatplane	Trainer	1918			
Sage Type 4	UK	Floatplane	Patrol	1917	Prototype	2	
Saro A.17 Cutty Sark	UK	Amphibian	Transport	1929	Production	12	
Saro A.19 Cloud	UK	Flying boat	Transport	1930	Production	22	
Saro A.33	UK	Flying boat	Patrol	1938	Prototype		
Saro Lerwick	UK	Flying boat	Patrol	1940	Production	21	
Saro London	UK	Flying boat	Patrol	1934	Production	31	
Saro Shrimp	UK	Flying boat	Experimental	1939	Prototype		
Saro Windhover	UK	Flying boat	Transport	1930			
Saunders A.7 Severn	UK	Flying boat		1930	Prototype		
Saunders A.14	UK	Flying boat	Experimental	1928	Prototype		
Saunders A.3 Valkyrie	UK	Flying boat	Patrol	1927	Prototype		
Saunders A.4 Medina	UK	Flying boat	Transport	1925	Prototype		
Saunders Kittiwake	UK	Amphibian		1920	Prototype		
Saunders-Roe Princess	UK	Flying boat	Transport	1952	Prototype		
Saunders-Roe SR.A/1	UK	Flying boat	Fighter	1947	Prototypes	3	
Savoia-Marchetti S.55	Italy	Flying boat	Transport/Bomber	1924	Production	243+	
Savoia-Marchetti S.56	Italy	Amphibian	Trainer	1924	Production	70 ca.	
Savoia-Marchetti S.57	Italy	Flying boat	Patrol	1923			
Savoia-Marchetti S.59	Italy	Flying boat	Patrol/bomber	1925			
Savoia-Marchetti S.65	Italy	Floatplane	Racer	1929			
Savoia-Marchetti S.66	Italy	Flying boat	Transport	1931	Production	24	
Savoia-Marchetti SM.62	Italy	Flying boat	Patrol/bomber	1926			
Savoia-Marchetti SM.78	Italy	Flying boat	Patrol/bomber	1932	Production	49	
Savoia-Marchetti SM.87	Italy	Floatplane	Transport	1939	Prototype		
SCAN 20	France	Flying boat	Trainer	1945			
Seawind 300C	Canada	Amphibian	Transport	1982			
SET 7H	Romania	Floatplane	Patrol	1935			
Shavrov Sh-1 & Sh-2	USSR	Amphibian	Transport	1929	Production	700+	
Shavrov Sh-3	USSR	Amphibian	Transport	1936	Prototype		
Shavrov Sh-5	USSR	Amphibian	Patrol	1934	Prototype		
Shavrov Sh-7	USSR	Amphibian		1940	Prototype		
Shin Meiwa PS-1	Japan	Flying boat	Patrol	1967	Production	23	
Shin Meiwa UF-XS	Japan	Flying boat	Experimental	1962	Experimental	1	PS-1 hull form
Shin Meiwa US-1	Japan	Amphibian	Search & rescue	1974	Production	6	
Shin Meiwa US-1A	Japan	Amphibian	Search & rescue	1974	Production	14	
ShinMaywa US-2	Japan	Amphibian	Search & rescue	2007	Production	8	
Short Admiralty Type 74	UK	Floatplane	Patrol	1914	Production	7	
Short Admiralty Type 135	UK	Floatplane	Patrol	1910s			
Short Admiralty Type 166	UK	Floatplane	Patrol	1914	Production	26	
Short Admiralty Type 827	UK	Floatplane	Patrol	1914	Production	108	
Short Admiralty Type 830	UK	Floatplane	Patrol	1914	Production	18	
Short Gurnard	UK	Floatplane	Fighter/Patrol	1929	Prototype	2	
Short Kent	UK	Flying boat	Transport	1931	Production	3	
Short Knuckleduster	UK	Flying boat	Patrol	1933	Prototype		
Short N.2A	UK	Floatplane	Patrol	1917	Prototype		
Short N.2B	UK	Floatplane		1917	Prototype		
Short N.3 Cromarty	UK	Flying boat	Patrol	1921	Prototype		
Short Rangoon	UK	Flying boat	Patrol	1930	Production		
Short S.1 Cockle	UK	Flying boat	Experimental	1924	Prototype		
Short S.5 Singapore I	UK	Flying boat	Patrol	1926	Prototype	1	
Short S.6 Sturgeon	UK	Floatplane	Experimental	1927	Prototype		
Short S.7 Mussel	UK	Floatplane	Private	1926	Prototypes	2	
Short S.8 Calcutta	UK	Flying boat	Transport	1928	Production	7	
Short S.12 Singapore II	UK	Flying boat	Patrol	1930	Prototype	1	
Short S.15	UK	Flying boat		1931	Prototype		
Short S.19 Singapore III	UK	Flying boat	Patrol	1934	Production	37	
Short S.20 Mercury	UK	Floatplane	Transport	1938	Prototype	1	Parasite aircraft in Short Mayo Composite
Short S.21 Maia	UK	Flying boat	Transport	1938	Prototype	1	Mothership for Short Mayo Composite
Short S.23, S.30 & S.33 Empire C-Class	UK	Flying boat	Transport	1936	Production	42	
Short S.26 G-Class	UK	Flying boat	Transport	1936	Production	3	
Short S.80	UK	Floatplane	Patrol	1913	Prototype	1	
Short S.81	UK	Floatplane	Patrol	1913			
Short Sandringham	UK	Flying boat	Transport	1943	Production		
Short Sarafand	UK	Flying boat	Patrol	1932	Prototype	1	
Short Scion Senior	UK	Floatplane	Transport	1935	Production		
Short Seaford	UK	Flying boat	Patrol	1944	Production	10	
Short Sealand	UK	Amphibian	Transport	1947	Production	25	
Short Shetland	UK	Flying boat	Patrol/Transport	1944	Prototypes	2	
Short Solent	UK	Flying boat	Transport	1946	Production	24	7 converted from Seaford
Short Sunderland	UK	Flying boat	Patrol	1937	Production	749	
Short Type 184	UK	Floatplane	Bomber	1915	Production	936	
Short Type 310	UK	Floatplane	Bomber	1916	Prototypes	2	
Short Type 320	UK	Floatplane	Bomber	1916	Production	125	
Short Valetta	UK	Floatplane	Patrol	1930	Prototype	1	
Short-Bristow Crusader	UK	Floatplane	Racer	1927			
SIAI S.8	Italy	Flying boat	Patrol	1917			
SIAI S.9	Italy	Flying boat	Patrol	1918			
SIAI S.12	Italy	Flying boat	Patrol	1918			
SIAI S.13	Italy	Flying boat	Patrol	1919	Production		
SIAI S.16	Italy	Flying boat	bomber/Transport	1919	Production		
SIAI S.17	Italy	Flying boat	Racer	1920			
SIAI S.19	Italy	Flying boat	Racer	1920			
SIAI S.21	Italy	Flying boat	Racer	1921			
SIAI S.22	Italy	Flying boat	Racer	1921			
SIAI S.51	Italy	Flying boat	Racer	1922			
SIAI S.58	Italy	Flying boat	Fighter	1924		5 ca.	
SIAI S.67	Italy	Flying boat	Fighter	1930			
Sikorsky S-34	US	Amphibian	Transport	1927	Prototype		
Sikorsky S-36	US	Flying boat	Transport	1927	Prototype		
Sikorsky S-38	US	Amphibian	Transport	1928	Production	101	
Sikorsky S-39	US	Amphibian	Transport	1920s	Production	21	
Sikorsky S-40	US	Flying boat	Transport	1931	Production	3	
Sikorsky S-41	US	Amphibian	Transport	1930	Production	7	
Sikorsky S-42	US	Flying boat	Transport	1934	Production	10	
Sikorsky S-43	US	Amphibian	Transport	1935	Production	53	
Sikorsky VS-44 Excalibur & XPBS-1	US	Flying boat	Transport	1937	Production	5	
Singular Aircraft SA03	UK	Flying boat		2012			
SNCAC NC.4-10	France	Floatplane	Bomber	1939	Prototype		
SNCAO 30	France	Flying boat	Trainer	1938			
SNCASE SE-400	France	Floatplane	Patrol	1939	Prototype		
SNCASE SE-1210	France	Flying boat	Experimental	1949	Prototype	1	
Sopwith Baby	UK	Floatplane	Fighter	1915	Production		
Sopwith Bat Boat	UK	Flying boat		1913	Production	6	
Sopwith Schneider	UK	Floatplane	Racer	1919		1	
Sopwith Tabloid	UK	Floatplane	Racer	1914	Production		
SPCA Météore 63	France	Flying boat	Transport	1925	Production	3	
Spectrum RX 650 Beaver	Canada	Floatplane	Privates	1991			
Spencer Air Car	US	Amphibian	Transport	1945	Homebuilt	51	
Sperry Land and Sea Triplane	US	Amphibian		1918	Prototypes	2	
Spratt Model 107	US	Flying boat	private	1967	homebuilt	60	
Standard Twin Hydro	US	Floatplane		1916			
Stearman XOSS	US	Floatplane	Patrol	1938			
Stinson L-1 Vigilant	US	Floatplane	Patrol	1940			
Stinson L-13	US	Floatplane	Patrol	1945			
Sun Lake Aircraft	US	Amphibian	Private				
Supermarine Air Yacht	UK	Flying boat	Transport	1931	Prototype	1	
Supermarine Baby	UK	Flying boat	Fighter	1917	Prototype	2	
Supermarine Channel	UK	Flying boat		1919	Production	10	
Supermarine S.4	UK	Floatplane	Racer	1925		1	
Supermarine S.5	UK	Floatplane	Racer	1927		3	
Supermarine S.6	UK	Floatplane	Racer	1931		2	
Supermarine S.6B	UK	Floatplane	Racer	1931		2	
Supermarine Scapa	UK	Flying boat	Patrol	1935	Production	15	
Supermarine Scarab	UK	Flying boat	Patrol	1924	Production	12	
Supermarine Sea Eagle	UK	Amphibian		1923	Production	3	
Supermarine Sea King	UK	Flying boat	Fighter	1920	Prototype	2	
Supermarine Sea Lion I	UK	Flying boat	Racer	1919		1	
Supermarine Sea Lion II	UK	Flying boat	Racer	1922		1	
Supermarine Sea Lion III	UK	Flying boat	Racer	1923		1	
Supermarine Sea Otter	UK	Flying boat	Patrol	1938	Production	292	
Supermarine Seagull	UK	Flying boat	Patrol	1922	Production	34	
Supermarine Seagull ASR-1	UK	Amphibian	Patrol	1948	Prototype	2	
Supermarine Seal II	UK	Amphibian	Patrol	1921	Prototype	1	
Supermarine Southampton	UK	Flying boat	Patrol	1925	Production	83	
Supermarine Spitfire	UK	Floatplane	Fighter	1940			
Supermarine Stranraer	UK	Flying boat	Patrol	1936	Production	57	
Supermarine Swan	UK	Flying boat	Transport	1924	Prototype	1	
Supermarine Walrus	UK	Flying boat	Patrol	1936	Production	740	
Taylor Coot	US	Amphibian	Private	1969	Homebuilt		
Thurston Teal	US	Amphibian	Private	1960s	Production	38	
Trident TR-1 Trigull	Canada	Flying boat	Transport	1973			
Tupolev ANT-4	USSR	Floatplane	Bomber	1925	Production	218	
Tupolev ANT-8	USSR	Flying boat	Patrol	1931	Prototype	1	
Tupolev ANT-22	USSR	Flying boat	Patrol	1934	Prototype	1	
Tupolev MP-6	USSR	Floatplane	Patrol	1923	Production	411	
Tupolev MTB-1	USSR	Flying boat	Patrol	1934	Production	15	
Tupolev MTB-2	USSR	Flying boat	Bomber/Transport	1937	Prototypes	2	
Tupolev TB-1P	USSR	Floatplane	Bomber	1923			
Utva 66H	Yugoslavia	Floatplane	Trainer	1960s			
Vickers Valentia	UK	Flying boat	Transport	1918	Prototypes	3	
Vickers Vanellus	UK	Amphibian	Patrol	1922	Prototype	1	
Vickers Vendace	UK	Floatplane	Trainer	1926		1	4 others built as landplanes
Vickers Viking	UK	Amphibian	Transport	1919	Production	31	
Vickers Vildebeest	UK	Floatplane	Patrol	1926			
Vickers Vulture	UK	Amphibian	Transport	1924	Prototype	2	
VL Sääski	Finland	Floatplane	Trainer	1928	Production	38	
Voisin L	France	Floatplane	Patrol	1912			
Volmer VJ-22 Sportsman	US	Amphibian	Private	1958	Homebuilt		
Vought O2U Corsair	US	Floatplane	Patrol	1926			
Vought O3U Corsair	US	Floatplane	Patrol	1930			
Vought O5U	US	Floatplane	Patrol	1934			
Vought OS2U Kingfisher	US	Floatplane	Patrol	1938	Production	1519	
Vought UO	US	Floatplane	Patrol	1922			
Vought VE-9H	US	Floatplane	Patrol	1922			
Vought VE-10 Batboat	US	Flying boat	Trainer	1919			
Vought XSB2U-3 Vindicator	US	Floatplane	Bomber	1936		1	
Vought XSO2U	US	Floatplane	Patrol	1939			
Vultee V-1AS	US	Floatplane	Transport	1933		1	For USSR
Vultee V-11GB2F	US	Floatplane	Bomber	1935		1	For Brazil
Wackett Widgeon	Australia	Amphibian		1925			
Waco Standard Cabin series	US	Floatplane	Transport	1931			
Waco ZQC-6	US	Floatplane	Transport	1936			
Walsh Brothers Flying Boats	New Zealand	Flying boat	Trainer	1915			
Watanabe E9W	Japan	Floatplane	Patrol	1934	Production	35	
Watanabe K6W	Japan	Floatplane	Trainer	1937			
Watanabe K8W	Japan	Floatplane	Trainer	1938			
Watanabe WS-103S	Japan	Floatplane	Patrol	1938			
Westland Wapiti	UK	Floatplane	Patrol	1927			
White and Thompson No. 3	UK	Flying boat		1914			
Wight Baby	UK	Floatplane	Fighter	1916			
Wight Converted Seaplane	UK	Floatplane	Bomber	1916			
Wight Pusher Seaplane	UK	Floatplane		1914			
Wight Seaplane	UK	Floatplane		1915			
Wilson Global Explorer	US	Amphibian	Transport	1991			
Yokosuka E1Y	Japan	Floatplane	Patrol	1923			
Yokosuka E6Y	Japan	Floatplane	Patrol	1929			
Yokosuka E14Y	Japan	Floatplane	Patrol	1939	Production	126	
Yokosuka H5Y	Japan	Flying boat	Patrol	1936	Production	20	
Yokosuka Igo-Ko	Japan	Floatplane	Trainer	1920			
Yokosuka K1Y	Japan	Floatplane	Trainer	1924			
Yokosuka K4Y	Japan	Floatplane	Trainer	1930			
Yokosuka K5Y1	Japan	Floatplane	Trainer	1930s	Production	5770	
Yokosuka Ro-go Ko-gata	Japan	Floatplane	Patrol	1910s			
Zenith STOL CH 701	Canada	Floatplane		1986	Homebuilt		
Zeppelin-Lindau Rs.I	Germany	Flying boat	Patrol	1915	Prototype	1	Not flown
Zeppelin-Lindau Rs.II	Germany	Flying boat	Patrol	1916	Prototype	1	
Zeppelin-Lindau Rs.III	Germany	Flying boat	Patrol	1917	Prototype	1	
Zeppelin-Lindau Rs.IV	Germany	Flying boat	Patrol	1918	Prototype	1	

== See also ==
- List of seaplane operators
