= Friedrichshafen FF.53 =

FF.53
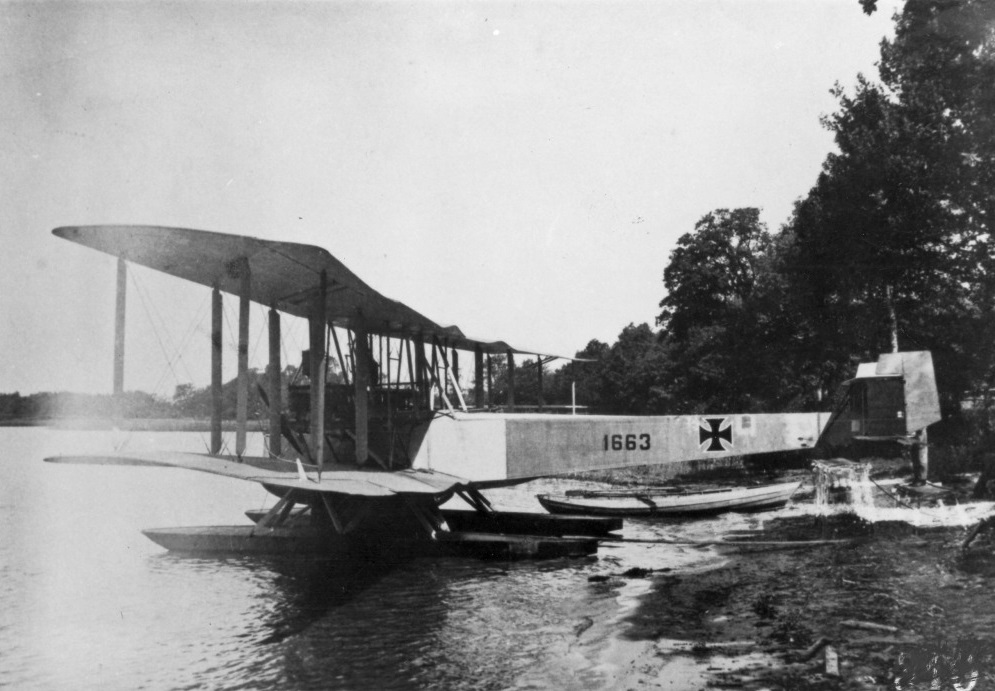

General information
- Type: Torpedo-bomber floatplane
- Manufacturer: Flugzeugbau Friedrichshafen
- Number built: 3

History
- First flight: 30 July 1918

The Friedrichshafen FF.53 was a German three-seat floatplane torpedo bomber built during World War I by Friedrichshafen Aircraft Construction Company (Flugzeugbau Friedrichshafen) after the end of the First World War for the Imperial German Navy's (Kaiserliche Marine) Naval Air Service (Marine-Fliegerabteilung). Three aircraft were ordered in 1917, but only one has been confirmed to have been completed in mid-1918. By the time it was delivered, the Naval Air Service had eliminated the torpedo-bomber mission and the FF.53s were to be completed as long-range maritime patrol aircraft.

== Design and description ==
The FF.53 was a twin-engined, three-seat biplane torpedo bomber that was based on the company's G.IIIa and G.IV heavy bombers. It most closely resembled the G.IIIa, although the FF.53 had its engines in a tractor configuration rather than the G.IIIa's pusher configuration; this was done to keep the propellers out of the spray from the floats. The water-cooled 260-metric-horsepower (191 kW) Mercedes D.IVa straight-six engines were mounted in nacelles positioned between the wings and supported by struts. Each engine drove a two-bladed propeller. The aircraft had three-bay wings.

The Naval Air Service ordered three FF.53 torpedo bombers in June 1917 and the prototype made its first flight on 30 July 1918. The project may have received a low priority because the Naval Air Service had abandoned the torpedo mission in early 1918 and the Gotha WD.14 was already performing the long-range maritime patrol mission. Reflecting this the prototype was configured for the same mission and was transferred to the Seaplane Experimental Command (Seeflugzeug-Versuchs-Kommando) the following month for testing. It is uncertain if the other two aircraft were ever completed as the Allies only found a single FF.53 at Warnemünde when they inspected the German seaplane bases in December 1918. Its ultimate fate is unknown, but it was likely scrapped.

== Specifications (FF.53) ==
Data from Flugzeugbau Friedrichshafen GmbH: Diplom-Ingenieur Theodor Kober

General characteristics

- Crew: 3
- Powerplant: 2 × Mercedes D.IVa water-cooled straight-six engines, 190 kW (260 hp) each
- Propellers: 2-bladed fixed-pitch propellers

Armament

- Bombs: 1 × torpedo

== See also ==
Related lists

- List of military aircraft of Germany
- List of flying boats and floatplanes

== Bibliography ==
- Andersson, Lennart & Sanger, Ray (2014). Retribution and Recovery: German Aircraft and Aviation 1919 to 1922. Air-Britain (Historians). ISBN 978-0-85130-467-0.
- Borzutzki, Siegfried (1993). Flugzeugbau Friedrichshafen GmbH: Diplom-Ingenieur Theodor Kober [Friedrichshafen Aircraft Company: Diploma-Engineer Theodore Kober] (in German). Burbach. ISBN 3-927513-60-1.
- Herris, Jack (2016). Friedrichshafen Aircraft of WWI: A Centennial Perspective on Great War Airplanes. Great War Aviation Centennial Series. Vol. 21. Aeronaut Books. ISBN 978-1-935881-35-3.
- Schmeelke, Michael (2020). "Torpedo Los!": The German Imperial Torpedo-Flieger. Aeronaut Books. ISBN 978-1-953201-17-1.
