= Militi M.B.1 =

Italian flying-boat glider

M.B.1

General information
- Type: Single-seat powered flying-boat glider
- National origin: Italy
- Designer: Bruno Militi

History
- First flight: 13 August 1967
- Developed into: Militi M.B.2 Leonardo

The Militi M.B.1 is an Italian single-seat flying-boat glider designed and built by Bruno Militi.

== Design and development ==
Militi started to build his design for a flying-boat glider in October 1964 and it first flew on 13 August 1967. The M.B.1 is a parasol-wing monoplane with a two-step hull and a fuselage of aluminium alloy, wood and fibreglass. The mixed construction wing is supported by two N-struts in the centre and a vee-strut outboard on each side, it has plain ailerons but no flaps. The pilot has an open cockpit with a small windscreen. From 1969 Militi developed a powered version as the M.B.2 Leonardo which first flew in 1970.

== Specifications ==
Data from Jane's All the World's Aircraft 1974-75

General characteristics

- Crew: 1
- Length: 5.91 m (19 ft 4.75 in)
- Wingspan: 8.05 m (26 ft 5 in)
- Width: 0.90 m (2 ft 11.5 in)
- Height: 1.95 m (6 ft 4.75 in)
- Wing area: 11.40 m^{2} (122.7 sq ft)
- Aspect ratio: 5.7
- Empty weight: 85 kg (187 lb)
- Gross weight: 165 kg (363 lb)

== See also ==
Related lists

- List of flying boats and floatplanes
- List of gliders
