= Friedrichshafen FF.48 =

FF.48
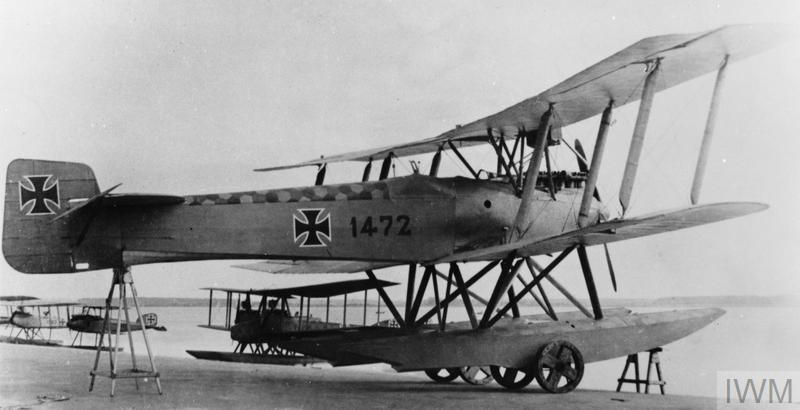
- A FF.48 with axles positioned underneath its floats

General information
- Type: Floatplane fighter
- Manufacturer: Flugzeugbau Friedrichshafen
- Number built: 3

History
- First flight: 22 August 1917

The Friedrichshafen FF.48 was a German two-seat floatplane fighter built during World War I by the Friedrichshafen Aircraft Construction Company (Flugzeugbau Friedrichshafen) for the Imperial German Navy's (Kaiserliche Marine) Naval Air Service (Marine-Fliegerabteilung). Three prototypes were built during 1917, but the aircraft was not selected for production.

== Design and description ==
The FF.48 was designed as an enlarged version of the FF.33H fighter in early 1917 to meet the Naval Air Service's requirement for a longer-ranged two-seat floatplane fighter to replace the Hansa-Brandenburg W.12. The aircraft was a two-bay biplane with staggered wings. The pilot's cockpit was forward of the observer's; there was a large semi-circular cutout in the upper wing to improve the pilot's view. The nose of the fuselage was streamlined to reduce drag, although the water-cooled 240-metric-horsepower (177 kW) Maybach Mb.IVa straight-six engine protruded from the top of the nose. The engine drove a two-bladed propeller fitted with a spinner. The radiator was located on the leading edge of the upper wing. The two floats were connected to the lower wing and the fuselage with a large number of struts. The aircraft's armament consisted of one fixed, forward-firing 7.92-millimeter (0.312 in) LMG 08/15 machine gun and a 7.92 mm Parabellum MG14 machine gun on a flexible mount for the observer.

The Naval Air Service ordered three prototypes of the FF.48 in April 1917 and the aircraft made its first flight on 22 August. The three aircraft were turned over to the Seaplane Experimental Command (Seeflugzeug-Versuchs-Kommando) in October for flight testing. The first prototype was assigned to Naval Air Station Flanders I (Seeflugstation Flandern I) at Zeebrugge in Occupied Belgium on 17 September for testing and it remained there until it was withdrawn on 16 May 1918. It is not known to have made any combat flights during its time there. The FF.48 reportedly had good speed and rate of climb for its size, but it may have lacked the desired maneuverability as no production order was placed.

== Specifications (FF.48) ==
Data from Flugzeugbau Friedrichshafen GmbH: Diplom-Ingenieur Theodor Kober

General characteristics

- Crew: 2
- Length: 11.2 m (36 ft 9 in)
- Wingspan: 16.25 m (53 ft 4 in)
- Height: 4.4 m (14 ft 5 in)
- Wing area: 68 m^{2} (730 sq ft)
- Empty weight: 1,591 kg (3,508 lb)
- Gross weight: 2,216 kg (4,885 lb)
- Powerplant: 1 × Maybach Mb.IVa water-cooled straight-six engine, 180 kW (240 hp)
- Propellers: 2-bladed fixed-pitch propellers

Performance

- Maximum speed: 153 km/h (95 mph, 83 kn)
- Cruise speed: 130 km/h (81 mph, 70 kn)
- Range: 740 km (460 mi, 400 nmi)
- Time to altitude:

1,000 m (3,300 ft) in 6 minutes 24 seconds
2,000 m (6,600 ft) in 14minutes 6 seconds
3,000 m (9,800 ft) in 23 minutes 6 seconds

Armament

- Guns: 1 × fixed, forward firing 7.92 mm (0.312 in) LMG 08/15 machine gun; 1 × 7.92 mm (0.312 in) Parabellum MG14 machine gun on pivoting mount in rear cockpit.

== See also ==
Related lists

- List of military aircraft of Germany
- List of flying boats and floatplanes

== Bibliography ==
- Borzutzki, Siegfried (1993). Flugzeugbau Friedrichshafen GmbH: Diplom-Ingenieur Theodor Kober [Friedrichshafen Aircraft Company: Diploma-Engineer Theodore Kober] (in German). Burbach. ISBN 3-927513-60-1.
- Herris, Jack (2016). Friedrichshafen Aircraft of WWI: A Centennial Perspective on Great War Airplanes. Great War Aviation Centennial Series. Vol. 21. Aeronaut Books. ISBN 978-1-935881-35-3.
- Schmeelke, Michael (2018). Zeebrugge: Naval Air Station Flanders I 1914–1918. Aeronaut Books. ISBN 978-1-935881-46-9.
