= RKIIGA-74 Experiment =

General information
- Type: Flying boat
- National origin: Soviet Union
- Manufacturer: Lenin Komosol Institute, Riga
- Number built: 1

History
- First flight: 17 September 1974

The RKIIGA-74 Experiment was a homebuilt single-engined flying boat designed and built by staff members and students of the Lenin Komosol Institute, Riga in the early 1970s.

== Design and development ==
In 1972, students at the Lenin Komosol Institute, Riga began work on a project to design an amphibian aircraft, named the RKIIGA74 Experiment, suitable for use in the numerous lakes and rivers of Latvia, which would be made from parts of existing machines that had already been designed and tested. The aircraft's wings and tail were taken from a KAI-12 Primorec glider, a Soviet license-built version of the Let LF-109 Pionýr, while the aircraft's hull was adapted from a Progress motorboat, with the windscreen moved rearwards and sloped more to reduce drag. The engine installation, including the nacelle and propeller were taken from an Aero Ae-145 light aircraft.

The Experiment was a parasol monoplane, with the fabric covered wooden wing attached to the hull by chrome-nickel steel cabane struts with also supported the engine, while the tail surfaces were carried on an open tailboom of lattice construction. The aircraft was powered by a single 100 kW (140 hp) Avia M332 air-cooled four-cylinder inverted inline engine driving a two-bladed propeller. The crew of two sat side-by-side in an open cockpit and were provided with dual controls.

On 6 September 1974, taxi trials began at Lake Baltezers, with short hops taking place. These tests resulted in the addition of a step to the aircraft's hull. Thus modified, the aircraft was flown for the first time on 17 September 1974. Performance both on the water and in the air was found to be good, and 15 flights were completed with about 2 hours total flight time. The Experiment was exhibited at Moscow in 1976.

== Specifications ==
Data from Študentský obojživelník RKIIGA-74 Experiment

General characteristics

- Crew: 2
- Length: 8.10 m (26 ft 7 in) (undercarriage retracted)
- Wingspan: 13.2 m (43 ft 4 in)
- Height: 2.40 m (7 ft 10 in) (undercarriage retracted)
- Wing area: 20.20 m^{2} (217.4 sq ft)
- Airfoil: NACA 43012
- Empty weight: 600 kg (1,323 lb)
- Max takeoff weight: 900 kg (1,984 lb)
- Fuel capacity: 90 L (20 imp gal; 24 US gal)
- Powerplant: 1 × Avia M 332 4-cylinder air-cooled inverted inline engine, 103 kW (138 hp)

Performance

- Maximum speed: 160 km/h (99 mph, 86 kn)
- Range: 500 km (310 mi, 270 nmi)
- Service ceiling: 4,000 m (13,000 ft)
