= Singular SA03 =

Singular Aircraft. Flyox I
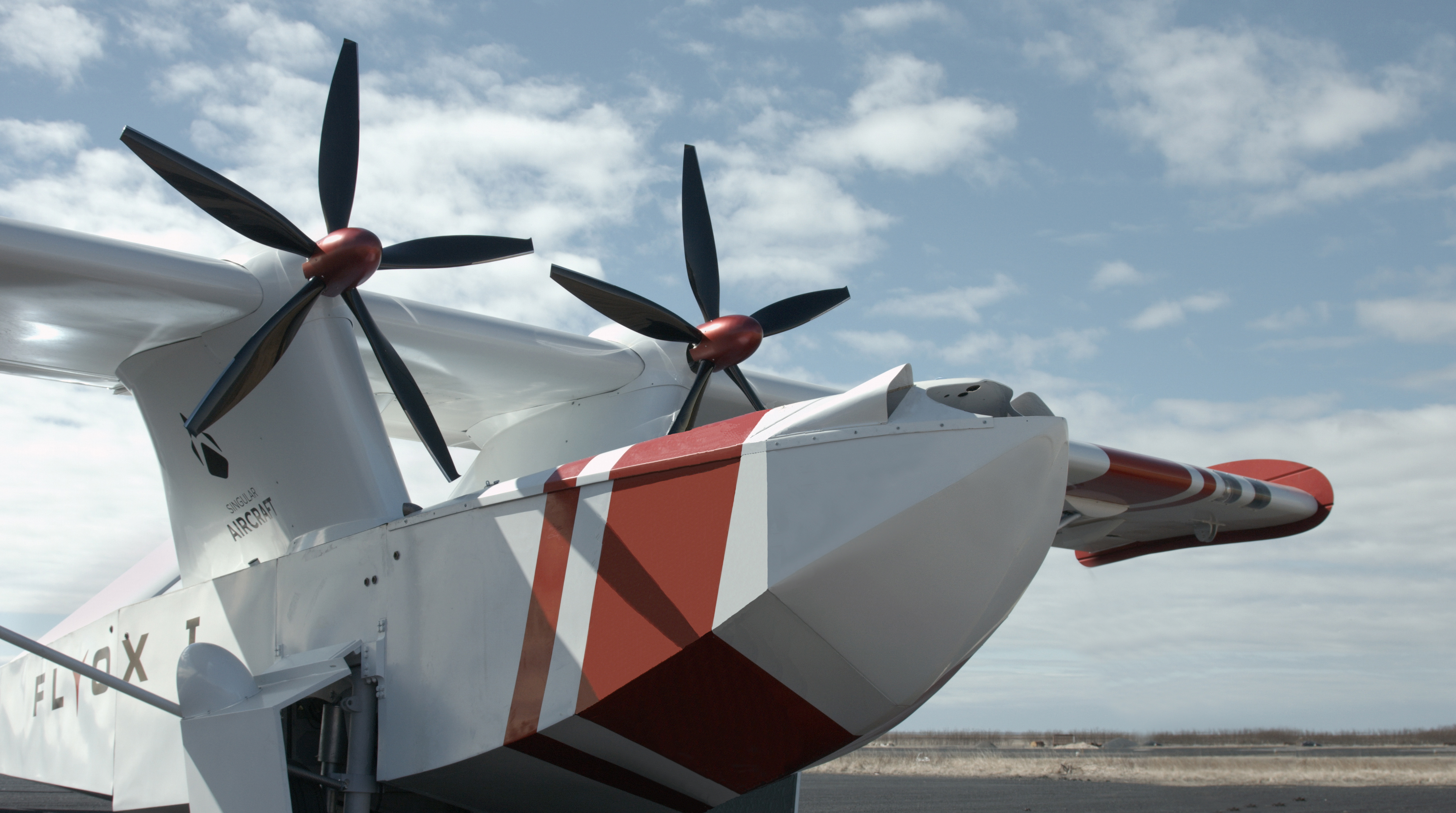
- Flyox I. The biggest amphibian UAV

General information
- Type: Unmanned aerial vehicle
- National origin: Spain
- Manufacturer: Singular Aircraft
- Designer: Singular Aircraft
- Status: Under production

History
- First flight: 2015

The Flyox I is an unmanned aerial vehicle flying boat, twin-engine, high-wing amphibious aircraft able to land and take off from short unpaved airstrips & water.

A first prototype was built and flown by Barcelona-based Singular Aircraft in 2015, with a second prototype flying in July 2020.

Four main configurations allow agricultural, firefighting, surveillance and general cargo capability, by itself or in fleet configuration, either by day and night operation.

In its aerial firefighting configuration can scoop 1,800 litres of water and drop it over forest fires.

When equipped with ferry tanks it has a range of 3,000 nmi, or can loiter for more than 30 hrs on surveillance missions.

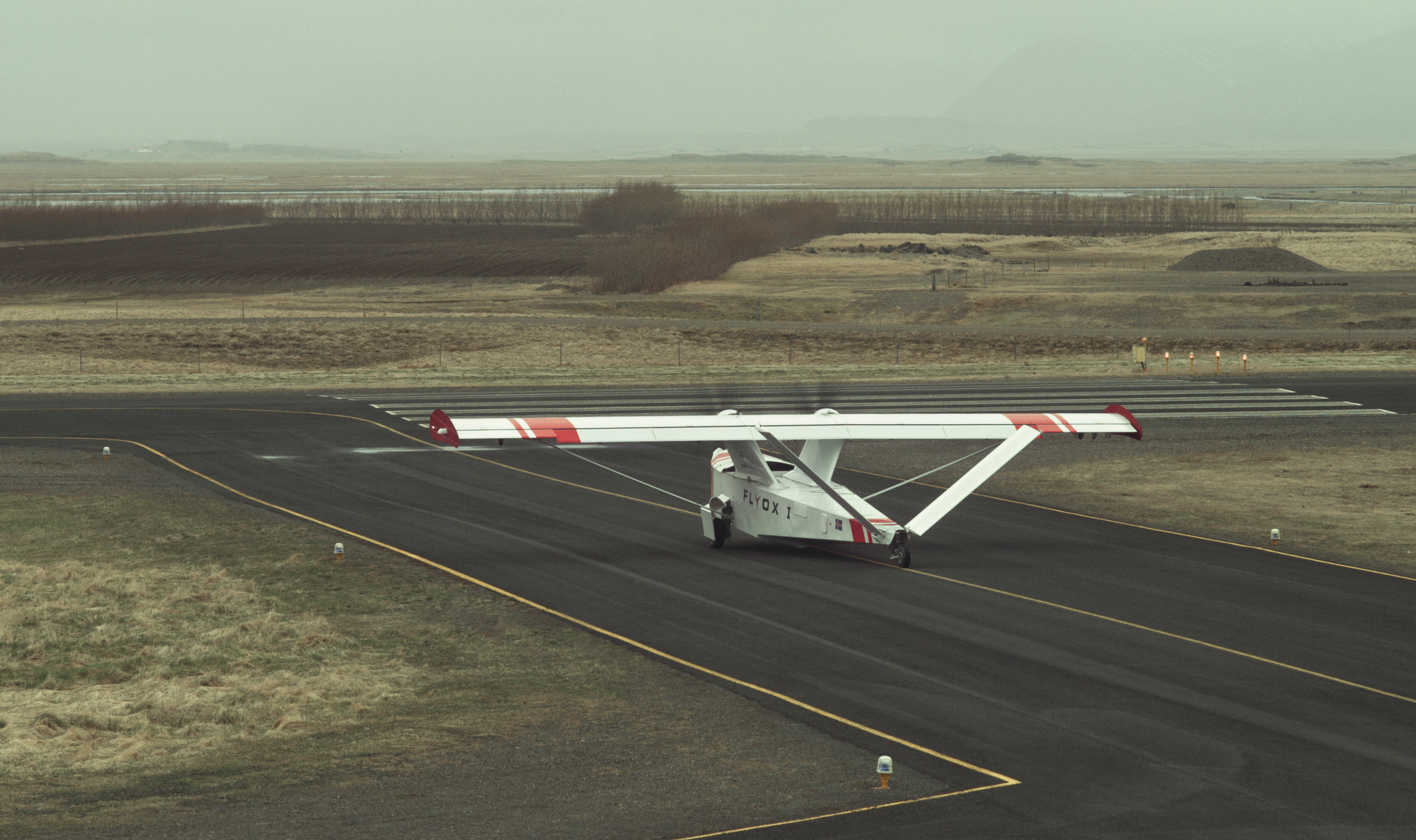
Test Zone I

== Specifications (Flyox I) ==
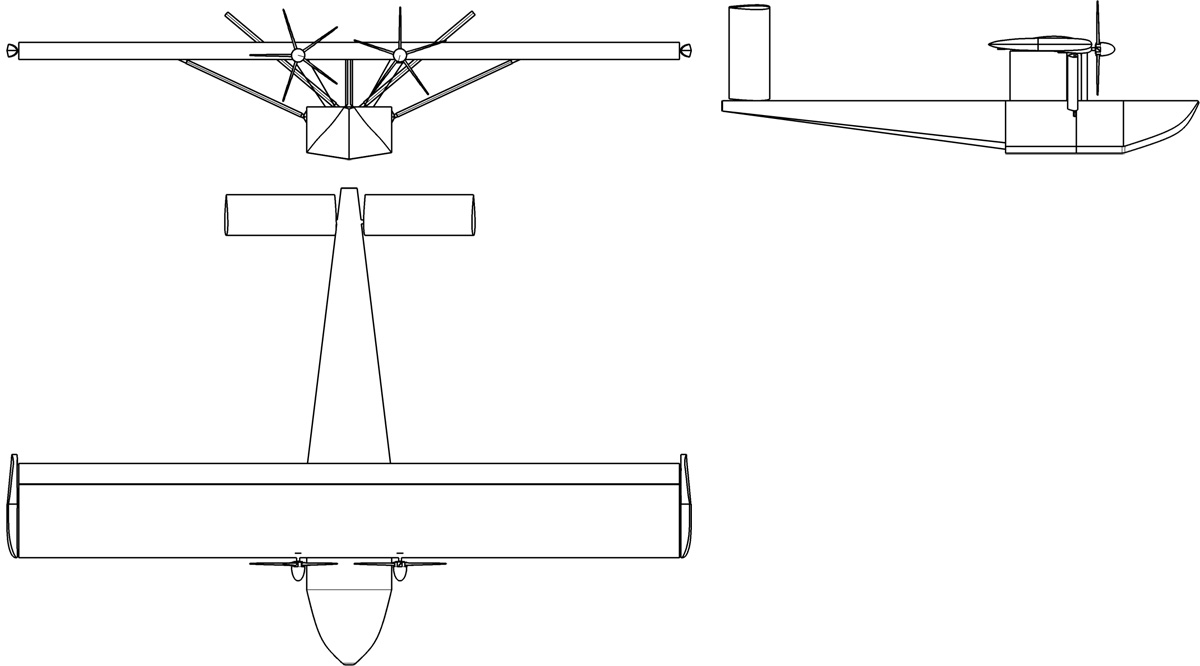
Singular Aircraft blue print

General characteristics

- Length: 37 ft 9 in (11.5 m)
- Wingspan: 45 ft 11 in (14 m)
- Height: 11 ft 10 in (3.6 m)
- Empty weight: 4,740 lb (2,150 kg)
- Max takeoff weight: 8,818 lb (4,000 kg)
- Propellers: 5-bladed, 6 ft 5 in (1.95 m) diameter

Performance

- Cruise speed: 120 kn (140 mph, 220 km/h)
- Never exceed speed: 147 kn (169 mph, 272 km/h)
- Range: 670 nmi (770 mi, 1,240 km)
- Ferry range: 3,000 nmi (3,500 mi, 5,600 km)
- Service ceiling: 20,000 ft (6,100 m)
- Rate of climb: 1,850 ft/min (9.4 m/s)

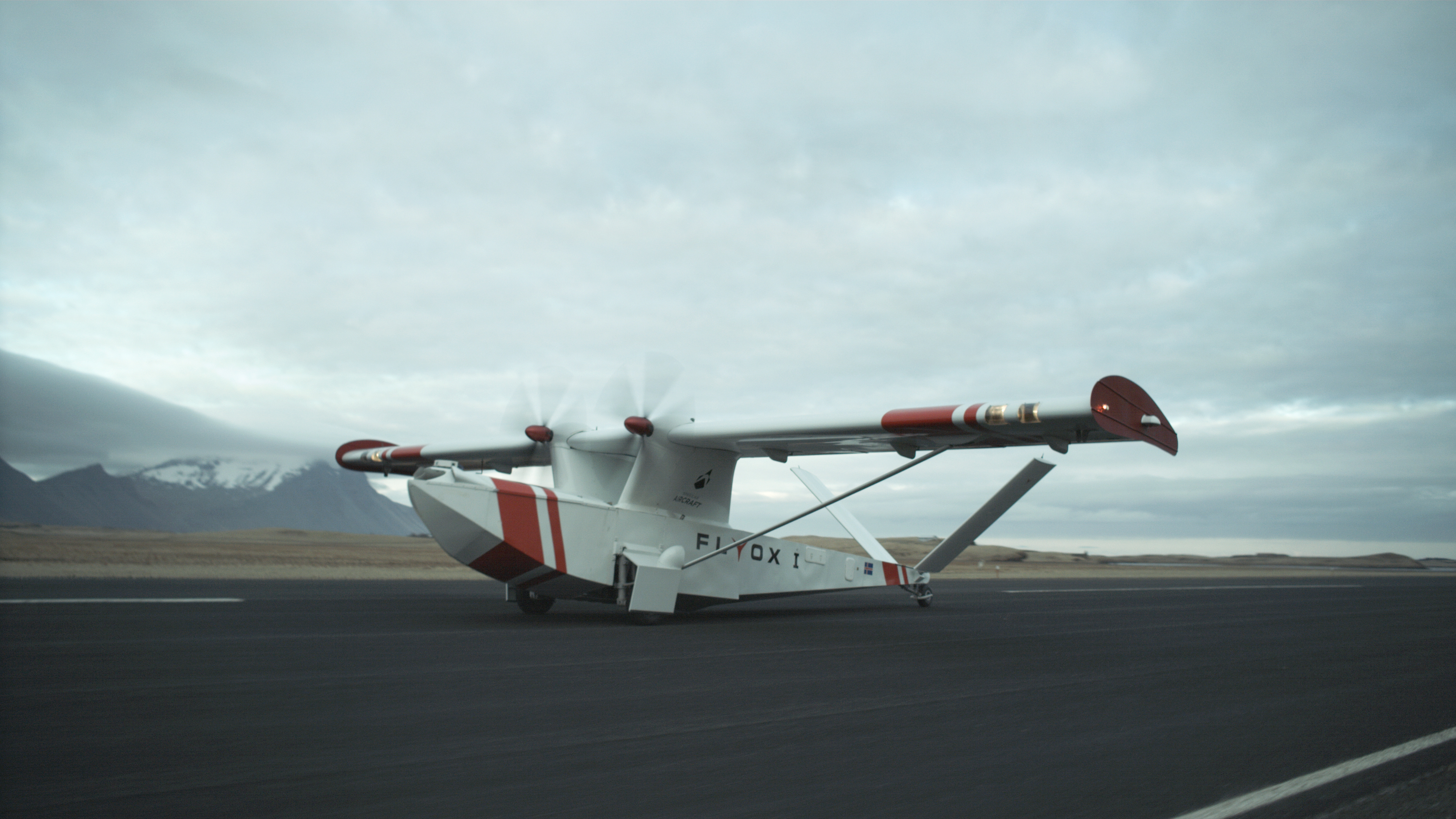
Test Zone I. Flyox I

== See also ==
Aircraft of comparable role, configuration, and era

- Canadair CL-215
- Air Tractor AT-802
- Ayres Thrush
- Embraer EMB 202 Ipanema
- Consolidated PBY Catalina
- Grumman G-21 Goose

Related lists

- List of unmanned aerial vehicles
- List of flying boats
