= Friedrichshafen FF.31 =

German maritime reconnaissance floatplane

FF.31
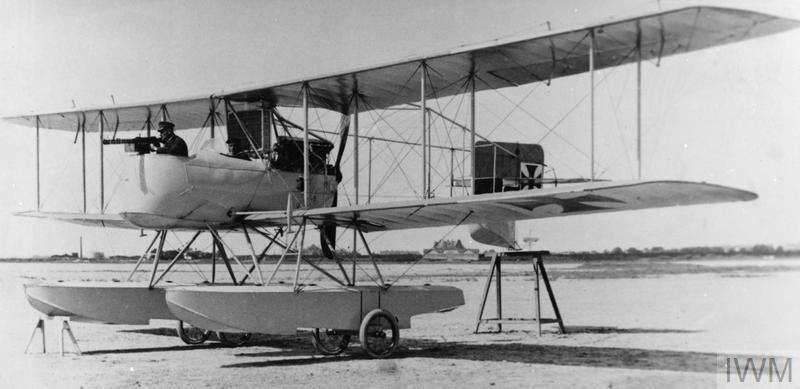
- A FF.31 with axles installed underneath its floats

General information
- Type: Two-seat maritime reconnaissance floatplane
- Manufacturer: Flugzeugbau Friedrichshafen
- Primary user: Imperial German Navy
- Number built: 2

History
- First flight: 12 April 1915

The Friedrichshafen FF.31 was a two-seat prototype German maritime reconnaissance floatplane built by Flugzeugbau Friedrichshafen during the First World War. Although primarily intended for reconnaissance duties, the aircraft was provided with a machine gun to engage other aircraft. Although it was satisfactory for its intended mission, it lacked the performance necessary for use as a fighter. A pair of aircraft were built in 1915 and it was not accepted for production by the Imperial German Navy's (Kaiserliche Marine) Naval Air Service (Marine-Fliegerabteilung).

== Background and description ==
Developed from the prewar Friedrichshafen FF.27 maritime reconnaissance floatplane, the FF.31 was fitted with a machine gun for the observer who had an excellent field of fire from his position in the front cockpit. The aircraft was intended by Flugzeugbau Friedrichshafen to be able to intercept enemy aircraft in addition to its primary reconnaissance mission, but its lack of speed and poor rate of climb made this difficult at best. Furthermore, by this time, the vulnerability of pusher-configuration aircraft to attacks from the rear had been realized. The first prototype flew on 12 April 1915 and was deemed an acceptable maritime patrol aircraft, but its poor performance as a fighter caused the Naval Air Service to reject it for service.

The FF.31 was a twin-boom biplane with a central nacelle with the 160-metric-horsepower (120 kW) Maybach Mb.III straight-six engine mounted at its rear. Two open-frame booms extended aft from the wings to carry the tail structure. It was fitted with two open cockpits in the nacelle. The observer was armed with a 7.92-millimetre (0.312 in) Parabellum MG14 machine gun on a flexible mount. The two forward floats were attached to the lower wing by four pairs of V-shaped struts while the third float was connected directly to the tail. To speed construction of the aircraft, the wings and floats from the Friedrichshafen FF.29 reconnaissance aircraft were used. A version of the FF.31 with conventional landing gear and a 150 PS (110 kW) Benz Bz.III engine was designated the FF.37, but it was also rejected for service.

== Variants ==
- FF.31: Two prototypes built.
- FF.37: FF.31 with conventional landing gear and a Benz Bz.III engine. One prototype built.

== Specifications (FF.31) ==
Data from Flugzeugbau Friedrichshafen GmbH: Diplom-Ingenieur Theodor Kober; Friedrichshafen Aircraft of WWI: A Centennial Perspective on Great War Airplanes

General characteristics

- Crew: 2
- Length: 10.15 m (33 ft 4 in)
- Upper wingspan: 16.85 m (55 ft 3 in)
- Lower wingspan: 15.8 m (51 ft 10 in)
- Height: 3.7 m (12 ft 2 in)
- Wing area: 60 m^{2} (650 sq ft)
- Empty weight: 1,063 kg (2,344 lb)
- Gross weight: 1,535 kg (3,384 lb)
- Powerplant: 1 × Maybach Mb.III water-cooled straight-six engine, 120 kW (160 hp) Originally measured as 160 PS (118 kW).
- Propellers: 2-bladed

Performance

- Maximum speed: 98 km/h (61 mph, 53 kn)
- Range: 500 km (310 mi, 270 nmi)
- Time to altitude: 500 m (1,600 ft) in 9 minutes 30 seconds; 800 m (2,600 ft) in 16 minutes

Armament

- Guns: 1 × 7.92 mm (0.312 in) Parabellum MG14 machine gun

== See also ==
Related lists

- List of military aircraft of Germany
- List of flying boats and floatplanes

== Bibliography ==
- Borzutzki, Siegfried (1993). Flugzeugbau Friedrichshafen GmbH: Diplom-Ingenieur Theodor Kober [Friedrichshafen Aircraft Company: Diploma-Engineer Theodore Kober] (in German). Berlin: Burbach. ISBN 3-927513-60-1.
- Gray, Peter & Thetford, Owen (1987) [1970]. German Aircraft of the First World War (2nd ed.). London: Putnam. ISBN 0-85177-809-7.
- Herris, Jack (2016). Friedrichshafen Aircraft of WWI: A Centennial Perspective on Great War Airplanes. Great War Aviation Centennial Series. Vol. 21. n.p.: Aeronaut Books. ISBN 978-1-935881-35-3.
