= Militi M.B.2 Leonardo =

M.B.2 Leonardo

General information
- Type: Single-seat powered flying-boat glider
- National origin: Italy
- Designer: Bruno Militi

History
- First flight: 21 June 1970
- Developed from: Militi M.B.1

The Militi M.B.2 Leonardo is an Italian single-seat powered flying-boat glider designed and built by Bruno Militi.

== Design and development ==
A powered version of Militi's M.B.1 flying-boat glider the Leonardo is a parasol-wing monoplane with a two-step hull and a fuselage of aluminium alloy, wood and fibreglass. The mixed construction wing is supported by two N-form cabane struts in the centre and a V-strut outboard on each side; it has plain ailerons but no flaps. The pilot has an open cockpit with a small windscreen. The 42 hp (31 kW) modified Panhard motor car engine is strut-mounted above the wing centre section and drives a two-bladed fixed-pitch laminated wood pusher propeller. The aircraft was first flown on 21 June 1970 and was exhibited at the 1972 Turin Air Show.

== Specifications ==
Data from Jane's All the World's Aircraft 1994-95

General characteristics

- Crew: 1
- Length: 5.91 m (19 ft 4.75 in)
- Wingspan: 8.14 m (26 ft 8.5 in)
- Width: 0.90 m (2 ft 11.5 in)
- Height: 2.20 m (7 ft 2.5 in)
- Wing area: 11.40 m^{2} (122.7 sq ft)
- Aspect ratio: 5.7
- Empty weight: 145 kg (319 lb)
- Gross weight: 250 kg (551 lb)
- Powerplant: 1 × Modified Panhard two-cylinder four-stroke air-cooled motor car engine , 31 kW (42 hp)

Performance

- Maximum speed: 116 km/h (73 mph, 63 kn)
- Cruise speed: 80 km/h (50 mph, 43 kn)
- Stall speed: 55 km/h (34.5 mph, 30.0 kn)
- Range: 200 km (124 mi, 108 nmi)
- Endurance: 2 hours 30 minutes
- Service ceiling: 4,000 m (13,125 ft)
- Rate of climb: 2.9 m/s (580 ft/min)

== See also ==
Related lists

- List of flying boats and floatplanes
- List of gliders
