= Hall Air Yacht =

Air Yacht

General information
- Type: 2-seat flying boat
- National origin: United States
- Designer: Charles Ward Hall
- Status: registration cancelled in May 1930.
- Number built: 1

History
- First flight: 1923

The Hall Air Yacht was a 2-seat, tandem, sesquiplane, flying boat, designed and built in the United States in 1923. The Air Yacht was Charles Ward Hall's first attempt at building an aircraft with his company Charles Ward Hall Inc. of Mamaroneck NY. Hall, and his later company Hall Aluminum Aircraft Corp., which would develop manufacturing processes for riveted aluminum alloy aircraft structures in the US. (Charles Ward Hall is not to be confused with Charles Martin Hall, the founder of Alcoa.)

== Specifications (Air Yacht) ==
Data from

General characteristics

- Crew: 1
- Capacity: 1 passenger / payload 440 lb (199.6 kg)
- Length: 25 ft 1 in (7.65 m)
- Wingspan: 25 ft 0 in (7.62 m)
- Height: 8 ft 9 in (2.67 m)
- Wing area: 194 sq ft (18.0 m^{2})
- Powerplant: 1 × Wright L-4 Gale 3-cylinder air-cooled radial piston engine, 60 hp (45 kW)

Performance

- Maximum speed: 75 mph (121 km/h, 65 kn)
