= Riga Civil Aviation Engineers Institute =

University in Riga, Latvia

Coordinates: 56.9395°N 24.1556°E

- Rīgas Civilās Aviācijas Inženieru Institūts
- Former names: Riga Higher Military Aviation Engineering School; Riga Civil Air Fleet Engineers Institute; Riga Civil Aviation Engineers Institute (RIIGA); Lenin Komsomol Riga Institute of Civil Aviation Engineers
- Type: Public
- Active: 24 May 1919–1999
- Location: Riga, Latvia

The Riga Civil Aviation Engineers Institute (RCAEI) (Latvian: Rīgas Civilās Aviācijas Inženieru Institūts (RCAII), Russian: Рижский институт инженеров гражданской авиации (РКИИГА until 1991), Рижский авиационный университет (РАУ until 1999)) was an engineering university in the USSR and Latvia. It was founded in 1919 and closed in 1999. Thousands of students graduated from the institute from over 93 countries. The institute had several different names during its history as well as moving from Kiev to Moscow to Petrograd to Riga. Riga Aviation University closed in 1999, with its programmes moved to Riga Technical University.

== History ==
On 24 May 1919, in Kiev a School of Aviation Mechanical Technicians was found. The aircraft repair shops and pilots' school - observers of the Kiev Polytechnical Institute - educational establishment where one of the first aviation society in Russia had been organized, were used as the school base. The members of this society were the aviation specialists who became famous later on: a pilot N. Nesterov the first one in the world who performed the "dead loop" and air ram attack; an aircraft designer I. Sikorsky - a founder of the first Russian heavy aircraft and a founder of the helicopter engineering in the USA.

From Kiev the school had been evacuated to Moscow and in 1921 it was shifted to Petrograd and renamed as the Advanced Training Courses for Engineering Staff.

=== Students of the 1930s ===
In 1938–39 a status of this educational establishment was changing according to the prevailing number of students and listeners raising the level of their skills.

In May 1938 the courses were given a new name as the First Aircraft Maintenance School, and, at the end of 1939 - again as the courses staying with this name right up till its renaming in 1946 into the First Leningrad Higher Military Aviation Engineering School.

=== After World War II ===
In June 1945 the school was relocated to Riga. In Riga also the Second Leningrad Higher Military Aviation Engineering School was functioning that had been reorganized from the technical school with similar name. Both schools had two faculties. The first - engineering and special electrical equipment, the second - radio engineering and air armaments. In 1949 both schools were joined in the Riga Higher Military Aviation Engineering School.

=== Soviet times ===
In June 1960 the School was broken up and on its base the civil higher school was found - the Riga Civil Air Fleet Engineers Institute. In 1967 in connection with the reorganization of the Main Directorate of Civil Air Fleet into the Ministry of Civil Aviation, the higher school was named as the Riga Civil Aviation Engineers Institute (RIIGA).

=== After Soviet Era ===
On 25 February 1992, the RIIGA passed under the jurisdiction of the Latvian Republic and changed its name to the Riga Aviation University.

To its 80th anniversary the RAU was the largest higher school in Latvia occupying the third line in the rating of the educational establishments in the country. At the end of the 90s the higher school faced a number of internal and external problems, and in August 1999 the Cabinet of Latvia made a decision about the liquidation of the RAU as the governmental higher school.

=== Higher education institutions based on RAU ===
In the course of RAU's existence, or with its participation, institutions of a wide variety of colleges, colleges, institutes, colleges and even academies were founded. They have different statuses, forms of ownership and curricula. Because they are housed in former RAU corps, there are former RAU faculty members in the teaching staff, and each of the following educational institutions considers itself to be, to varying degrees, a successor to the RAU:

- Baltic Russian Institute (after 2006 Baltic International Academy);
- School of Information Systems Management (ISMA);
- University of Culture and economics,
- Transport and Telecommunication Institute (TTI);
- Riga Technical University Aeronautical Institute.

The latter two institutes - Transport and Telecommunication Institute (TTI) and Riga Technical University Aeronautical Institute - can be named as the main successors of RAU. They are engaged in aeronautical training and have relationships with RCAII-RAU graduates of various years.

== Higher Civil Aviation Education in the USSR ==
In the USSR in 1971 there were four higher schools of civil aviation: the Kiev Institute of Civil Aviation Engineers (founded in 1933, awarded the Order of the Red Banner of Labor), the Lenin Komsomol Riga Institute of Civil Aviation Engineers (founded in 1960, awarded the Red Banner), the Moscow Institute of Aviation (founded in 1971), and the Higher School of Civil Aviation Engineers in Leningrad (founded in 1955, awarded the Order of Lenin, reorganized in 1971 into the Academy of Civil Aviation). All the higher educational institutions have daytime departments (except Riga), correspondence departments, and graduate studies; the Kiev institute has branches and academic-consultation offices in cities where large civilian airports are located. The period of schooling is four to five and a half years. Graduating students defend diploma projects (or papers) and receive the qualification of an engineer (mechanical engineer, electrical engineer, construction engineer, economic engineer, pilot-engineer, navigator-engineer) or radio engineer. Construction engineers are trained by the Kiev institute; economic engineers by the Kiev and Riga institutes; pilotengineers, navigator-engineers, and engineers in air traffic control are trained by the Leningrad school. The Kiev institute has been granted the right to admit applicants for the defense of candidates’ and doctoral dissertations, and the Riga and Leningrad higher educational institutions, candidates’ dissertations.
