= Spratt Model 107 =

Controlwing 107

General information
- Type: Sport flying boat
- National origin: United States
- Manufacturer: homebuilt
- Designer: George Spratt
- Number built: 60 sets of plans sold by 1977

History
- First flight: 1967

The Spratt Controlwing 107 was an unorthodox controlwing flying boat designed in the United States in the 1960s and marketed for home building in the 1970s.

The aircraft featured a flat, speedboat-like hull with a square bow and with tailfins blended into each side. The fins were angled to form a butterfly tail and included no moving surfaces. The wings were mounted on struts, parasol-style, and also contained no moving surfaces. Rather, each of the two wings could pivot independently to vary their angle of attack. The pilot and a single passenger sat side by side in an open cockpit with a converted marine outboard motor mounted behind them that drove a pusher propeller. The flight controls consisted of a helicopter-style collective that varied the angle of attack of both wings simultaneously, and a control wheel that varied their angles of attack in relation to one another. The hull was constructed from polyurethane foam and covered with fiberglass, and the wing panels were fiberglass throughout.

Designer George Spratt claimed that the Model 107 could not stall or spin, and that it was 75% less affected by turbulence than a conventional airplane design. With friend Elliot Dalland, Spratt began construction of the prototype (registered N2236) in 1962. During the 1970s, Spratt marketed plans for the Model 107 to homebuilders.

== Specifications (Controlwing 107) ==
Data from Markowski 1979, p.384

General characteristics

- Crew: one pilot
- Capacity: one passenger
- Length: 17 ft 0 in (5.18 m)
- Wingspan: 24 ft 0 in (7.32 m)
- Height: 5 ft 0 in (1.52 m)
- Wing area: 96 sq ft (8.9 m^{2})
- Empty weight: 500 lb (227 kg)
- Gross weight: 1,000 lb (454 kg)
- Powerplant: 1 × Mercury 800 converted marine engine , 80 hp (60 kW)

Performance

- Maximum speed: 98 mph (158 km/h, 85 kn)
- Service ceiling: 3,000 ft (910 m)
- Rate of climb: 800 ft/min (4.1 m/s)
