= Maule M-1 =

General information
- Type: Monoplane
- National origin: United States
- Designer: Belford Maule
- Number built: 1

History
- First flight: 1932

The Maule M-1 was a 1930s American single-seat monoplane designed an built by Belford Maule, the first in a series of aircraft designed by Maule.

== Design and development ==
Maule had joined the United States Army in 1918 and was employed as a mechanic working on airships, he decided to design and build his own aircraft later called the M-1. At the time he was close to Chesapeake Bay so the mid-wing monoplane was built as a floatplane with twin floats. The aircraft was powered by a Henderson 32 hp (24 kW) converted motorcycle engine. Maule left the Army and he transported his aircraft to his new home, now registered NC12634. He first flew it in 1932 although he had no flying experience at that time. In 1933 Maule joined the research and development department of Lycoming but by 1940 he left and continued to develop designs for aircraft. At some point, the aircraft was also fitted with a conventional wheeled undercarriage.
