= Nieuport VI =

French WW1 reconnaissance aircraft

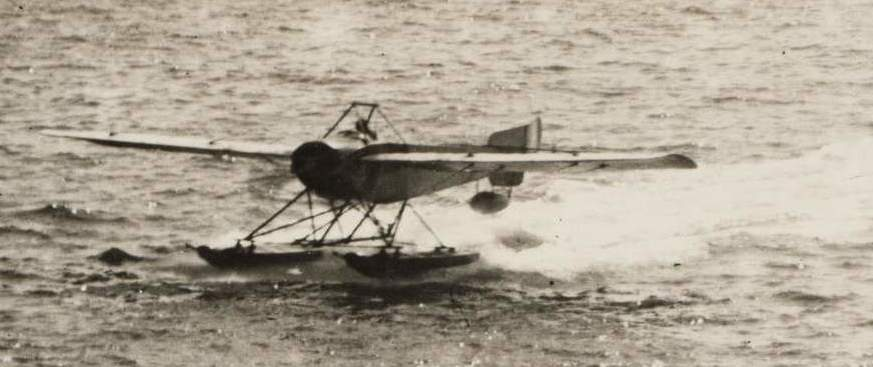

General information
- Type: Sport and reconnaissance aircraft
- National origin: France
- Manufacturer: Nieuport
- Status: retired

History
- First flight: 1912
- Developed from: Nieuport IV

The Nieuport VI was a sport monoplane produced in France in the 1910s, a further development by Nieuport along the same general lines as the Nieuport II and Nieuport IV, differing mainly from the Nieuport IV in being slightly larger. Like the Nieuport IV, it was used by various military air arms as a reconnaissance aircraft and trainer.

== Design and development ==
Like its predecessors, the Nieuport VI was a wire-braced, mid-wing monoplane of conventional design, powered by a single engine in the nose driving a tractor propeller. It differed, however, in being a three-seater rather than a single seater (a bench for two passengers fitted in tandem with the pilot's seat) and in using steel for part of its internal structure where earlier designs had used wood only. Produced initially as a seaplane and designated VI.G, it had twin pontoons as undercarriage, with a teardrop-shaped auxiliary float under the tail. The pontoons were fitted with small planes at either side of their nose ends to protect the propeller and to reduce the tendency for the nose ends of the floats to submerge while taxiing, and "stepped" keels. Since being a seaplane precluded the possibility of the pilot swinging the propeller by hand in order to start the engine, a crank was provided inside the cockpit that wound a spring that could be used to turn the engine over. The Type VI also featured a joystick for lateral control in place of the Blériot-style "cloche" controls used on earlier Nieuport designs. The Nieuport Vl also was powered by the "Gnome Lambda" which is classified as a Gnome Omega rotary engine, which made 50hp or 37kw.

A refined version was produced as the Nieuport VI.H with a revised empennage and other changes. This was operated by the French and British navies. A landplane version for military use was designated the Nieuport VI.M. Military Type VIs were built under licence in Italy by Nieuport-Macchi in Italy, and in Russia.

== Operational history ==
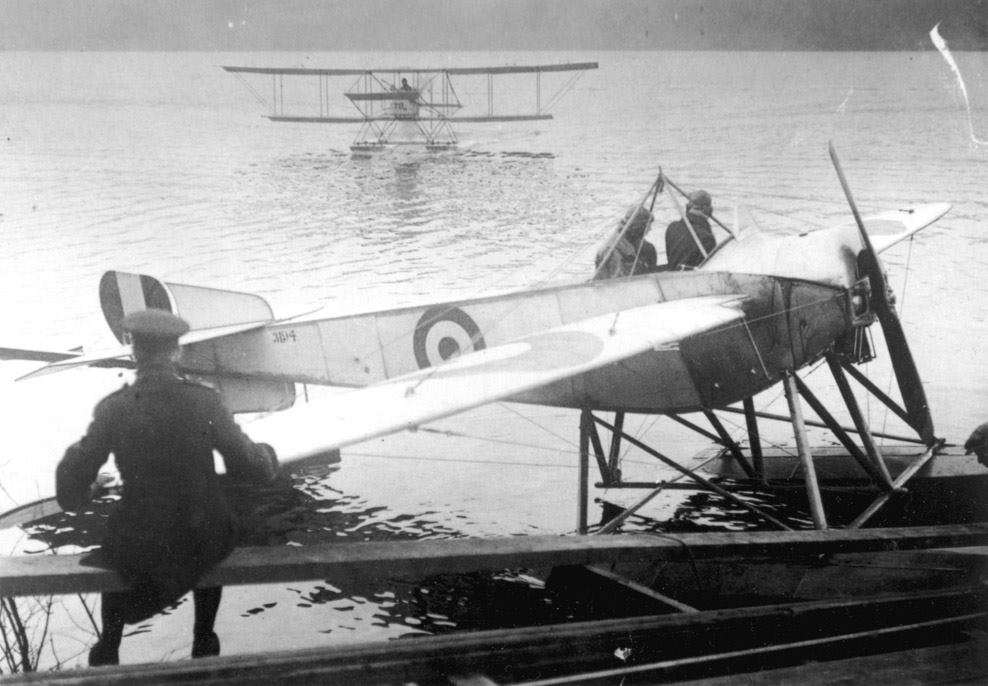
Royal Naval Air Service Nieuport VI.H flown from Lake Windermere for training

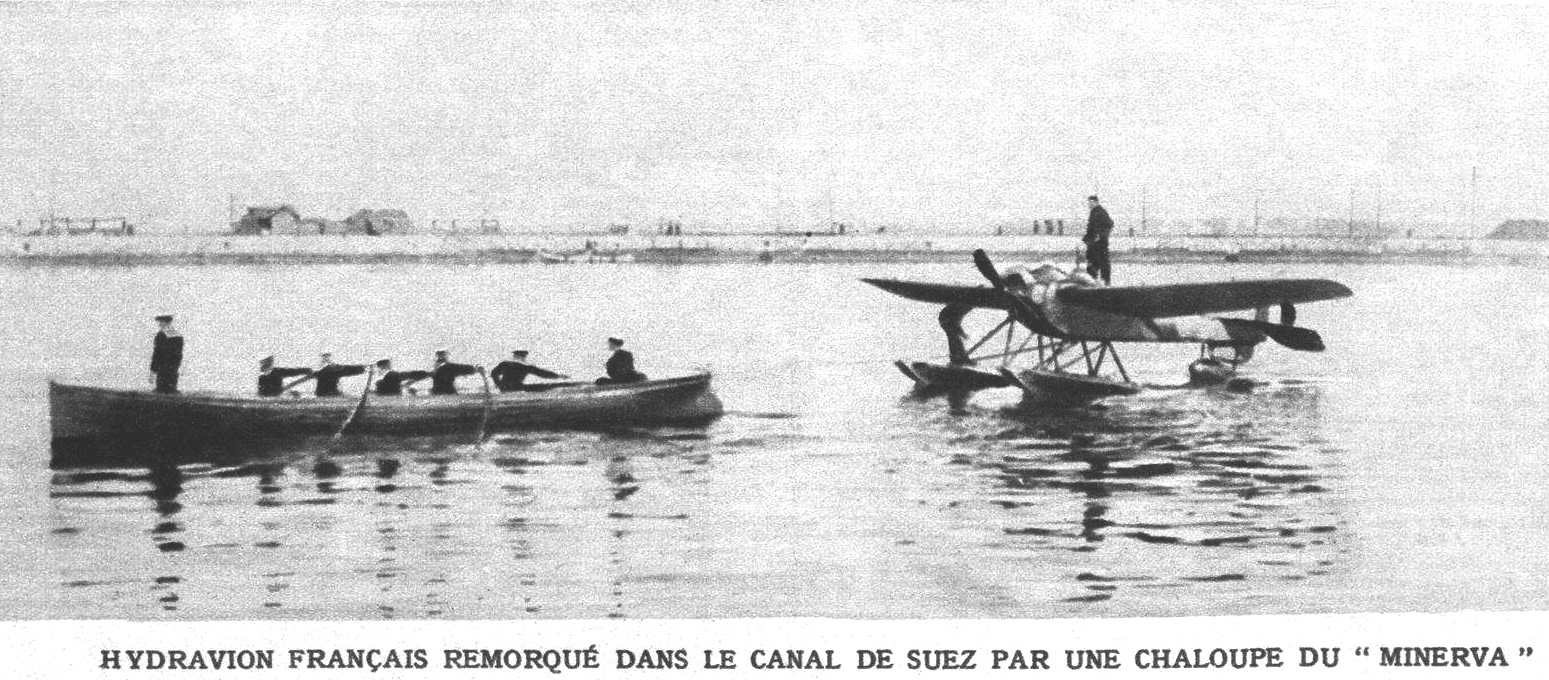
Nieuport VI.H on the Suez Canal in 1915

First flown in April 1912, the type was flown competitively in August in a race meeting organised by the Automobile Club de France and the French maritime ministry on the bay at Saint-Malo. PIloted by Charles Weymann, the Nieuport finished fifth in the competition, collecting a FF 2,000 prize but also the "Jersey Speed Prize" for winning the course on day 3 of the competition, which involved a flight from Saint-Malo to Jersey and back that Weymann completed in 1 hour and 41 minutes. This success led to an order by the French Navy for seven machines, which were delivered to the Navy seaplane station at Saint-Raphaël in January the following year. The government of Japan also ordered three machines at this time, and orders from the governments of Italy, Russia, Sweden, and the United Kingdom were also received by the end of 1912. One month after the Saint-Malo event, a Type VI.G flown by Armand Gobé competed in trials at Tamise-sur-Escaut in Belgium, but finished tenth out of fifteen. Nieuport exhibited the type at the 1912 Salon de l'Aéronautique in Paris in December, and the aviation shows in Brussels and at Olympia in London in early 1913.

The type continued to appear in major sporting events in 1913, commencing with the Grand Prix d'Hydroplanes in Monaco on 12 April. Two VI.Gs were entered in the competition, one flown by Weymann and the other by Gabriel Espanet. The race was called off, however, due to bad weather that over the next few days saw Espanet break a leg, Weymann involved in a serious accident and thrown from his plane, and fellow racer Louis Gaudart killed. On 16 April, the inaugural Schneider Trophy race was held. Out of six entrants, only four actually started the race, including both Weymann and Espanet in their Nieuport VI.Gs. Weymann withdrew after only eight of the twenty-eight laps, and Espanet withdrew with engine trouble on lap 25. In August, two Nieuport VI-Gs were entered in the seaplane race from Paris to Deauville, flown by Adrien Levasseur and Charles Weymann. Weymann was forced to abandon the race, but Levasseur finished second with a time of 7 hours and 38 minutes over the 330 km course – four hours behind the winner.

1913 also saw the type used in long-distance flying. In July, a Nieuport VI.G was chosen by Julien Levasseur for a 2,500 kilometre long-distance flight around the North Sea, which he and his passenger achieved in six days, flying from Paris to London, Dunkirk, Rotterdam, Amsterdam, Emden, Ostend, Rouen, and back to Paris, a trip which also included brief detention in London for having overflown sensitive areas of the city on arrival. In December, Jean Védrines and Marc Bonnier were amongst a number of French aviators who made flights from Paris to Cairo, both of them flying Nieuport VI.Gs.

At the outbreak of World War I, a number of Type VI.M landplanes remained in French, Italian, and Russian service, as did six Type VI.G seaplanes with the French Navy.

== Variants ==
- VI.G - initial seaplane version
- VI.H - refined seaplane version
- VI.M - military landplane

== Operators ==
France

- French Navy

Italy

- Corpo Aeronautico Militare

Russia

- Russian Naval Aviation

Turkey

- Ottoman Air Service

United Kingdom

- Royal Naval Air Service

== Specifications (VI.G) ==
Data from Sanger 2002, p.29

General characteristics

- Crew: 1, pilot
- Capacity: 1–2 passengers
- Length: 8.70 m (28 ft 7 in)
- Wingspan: 12.25 m (40 ft 2 in)
- Wing area: 40 m^{2} (430 sq ft)
- Empty weight: 700 kg (1,540 lb)
- Gross weight: 795 kg (1,750 lb)
- Powerplant: 1 × Gnome rotary engine , 60 kW (80 hp)

Performance

- Maximum speed: 105 km/h (65 mph, 56 kn)
