= Gotha WD.14 =

Family of planes developed in Germany

WD.14, WD.20, and WD.22
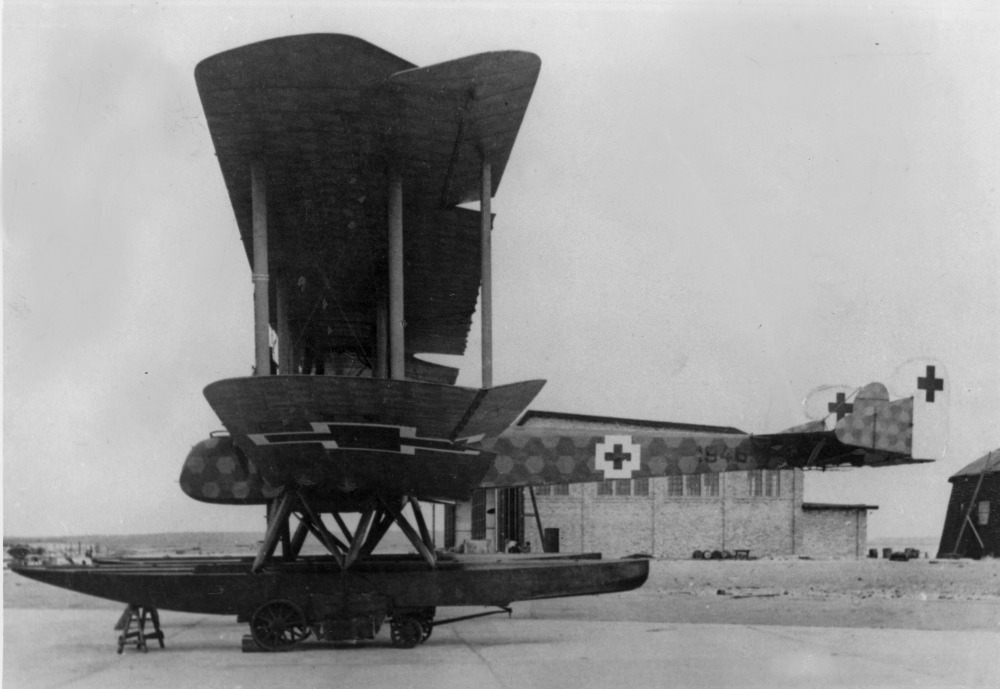

General information
- Type: Torpedo bomber
- National origin: Germany
- Manufacturer: Gotha
- Primary user: Imperial German Navy
- Number built: 69 x WD.14; 3 x WD.20; 2 x WD.22

History
- First flight: 1916

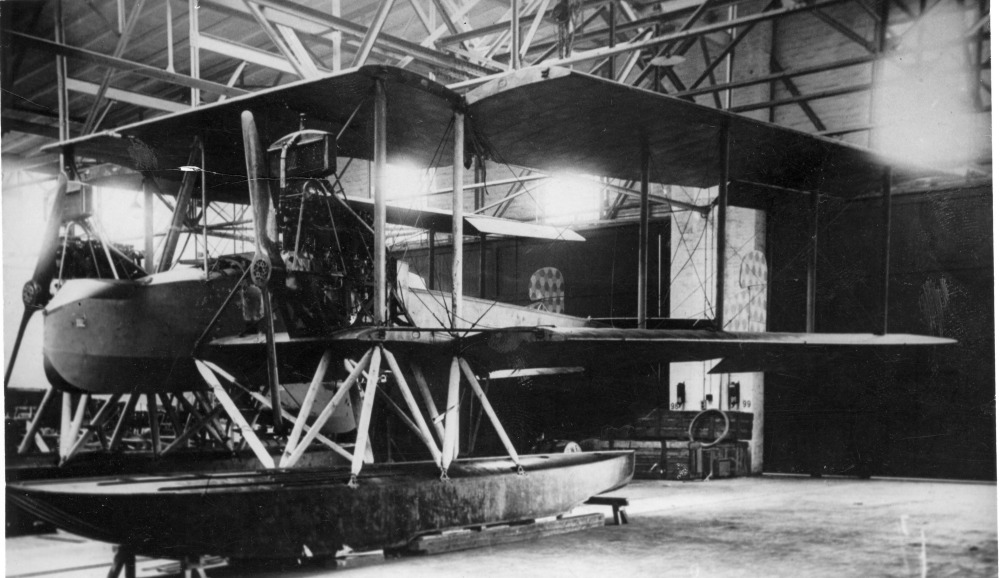
Gotha WD.20

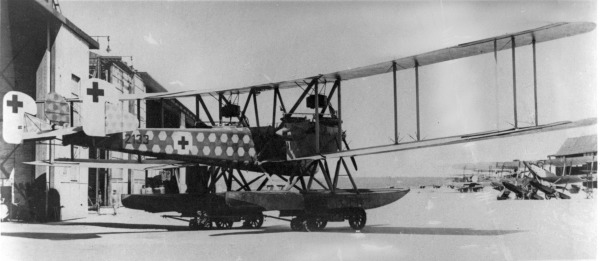
Gotha WD.22

The Gotha WD.14, WD.20, and WD.22 (Wasser Doppeldecker - "Water Biplane") were a family of biplane torpedo bomber floatplanes developed in Germany during World War I.

== Development ==
They were conventional biplanes, essentially enlarged versions of the WD.11 and like it they had twin engines mounted tractor-fashion on the lower wing. The wider fuselage of these aircraft allowed the pilot and observer to sit side-by-side in the open cockpit, and a second 7.92 mm (.312 in) machine gun was added in an open dorsal position. Hinges were added to the wings, allowing them to be folded for storage.

69 WD.14s were built, but were found to be ineffective in their intended role of torpedo bomber, since their low speed made them extremely vulnerable to defensive fire. Many were subsequently converted into mine layers, and some were even used as transports, landing machine gun detachments during Operation Albion in October 1917. The WD.20 differed from the WD.14 only in having large auxiliary fuel tanks for long-range reconnaissance and having no torpedo- or mine-carrying capability.

A small number of generally similar WD.22 prototypes were built, these differing from the WD.20 in having two extra engines added, creating two tractor-pusher pairs, one on each wing.

== Variants ==
WD.14
Twin-engined torpedo bomber
WD.20
Twin-engined long-range reconnaissance aircraft; three built.
WD.22
Four-engined long-range reconnaissance aircraft, powered by 2 x 160 hp (120 kW) Mercedes D.III tractor engines and 2 x 100 hp (75 kW) Mercedes D.I pusher engines in tandem nacelles; two built.

== Specifications (WD.14) ==
Data from German Aircraft of the First World War

General characteristics

- Crew: 3
- Length: 14.45 m (47 ft 5 in)
- Wingspan: 25.5 m (83 ft 8 in)

WD.22: 26 m (85 ft)

- Height: 5 m (16 ft 5 in)
- Wing area: 131.7 m^{2} (1,418 sq ft)

WD.22: 147 m^{2} (1,580 sq ft)

- Empty weight: 3,150 kg (6,945 lb)

WD.20: 3,030 kg (6,680 lb)
WD.22: 3,800 kg (8,400 lb)

- Gross weight: 4,642 kg (10,234 lb)

WD.20: 4,540 kg (10,010 lb)
WD.22: 5,170 kg (11,400 lb)

- Powerplant: 2 × Benz Bz.IV 6-cylinder water-cooled in-line piston engine, 150 kW (200 hp) each
- Powerplant: 2 × Mercedes D.III 6-cylinder water-cooled in-line piston engines, 120 kW (160 hp) each WD.22
- Powerplant: 2 × Mercedes D.I 6-cylinder water-cooled in-line piston engines, 75 kW (100 hp) each WD.22
- Propellers: 2-bladed wooden fixed-pitch propellers

Performance

- Maximum speed: 130 km/h (81 mph, 70 kn)

WD.20: 126 km/h (78 mph; 68 kn)
WD.22: 131 km/h (81 mph; 71 kn)

- Endurance: 8 hours

WD.20: 10 hours

- Rate of climb: 1.3 m/s (260 ft/min)
- Time to altitude: WD.20: 1,000 m (3,300 ft) in 15 minutes

Armament

- Guns:
  - 1 × trainable, forward-firing 7.92 mm (0.312 in) Parabellum MG 14 machine gun in nose for observer
  - 1 × trainable, rearward-firing 7.92 mm (0.312 in) Parabellum MG 14 machine gun in dorsal position
- Bombs: 1 × 725 kg (1,598 lb) torpedo (WD.20 and WD.22 no torpedo)
