= CANT 12 =

1920s Italian flying boat

General information
- Type: Flying boat trainer
- Manufacturer: CANT
- Designer: Raffaele Conflenti
- Primary user: Regia Marina
- Number built: 1

History
- First flight: 1926

The CANT 12 was a flying boat and training aircraft that was produced in Italy in the 1920s.

== Design ==
The CANT 12 was a traditional center-shaped seaplane for the era. The hull was characterized by an open cockpit in an advanced position that ended posteriorly in a single-headed cruciform fletching and horizontal braced planes. The wing configuration was biplane, with wings of equal size connected to each other by a series of uprights and tie rods, with the lower one equipped with small floating balancers. The propulsion was entrusted to a single Isotta Fraschini V.6 engine, an air-cooled six-cylinder V engine capable of delivering a power of 250 bhp (190 kW), mounted in a pivotal configuration and connected to a two-bladed wooden propeller fixed.

== Development ==
The CANT 12 was developed in 1926 as a variant of the previous CANT 7. The prototype was built at the Monfalcone shipyard but after flight test results were unsatisfactory and the development program was cancelled.

== Specifications ==
Data from

General characteristics

- Crew: 3
- Length: 9.15 m (30 ft 0 in)
- Wingspan: 11.80 m (38 ft 8 in)
- Empty weight: 935 kg (2,061 lb)
- Gross weight: 1,350 kg (2,976 lb)
- Powerplant: 1 × Isotta Fraschini V.6 6-cylinder water-cooled in-line piston engine , 187 kW (250 hp)

Performance

- Maximum speed: 165 km/h (103 mph, 90 kn)
- Endurance: 4 hours

== See also ==
Related lists

- List of flying boats and floatplanes
