= CANT 23 =

1920s Italian aircraft

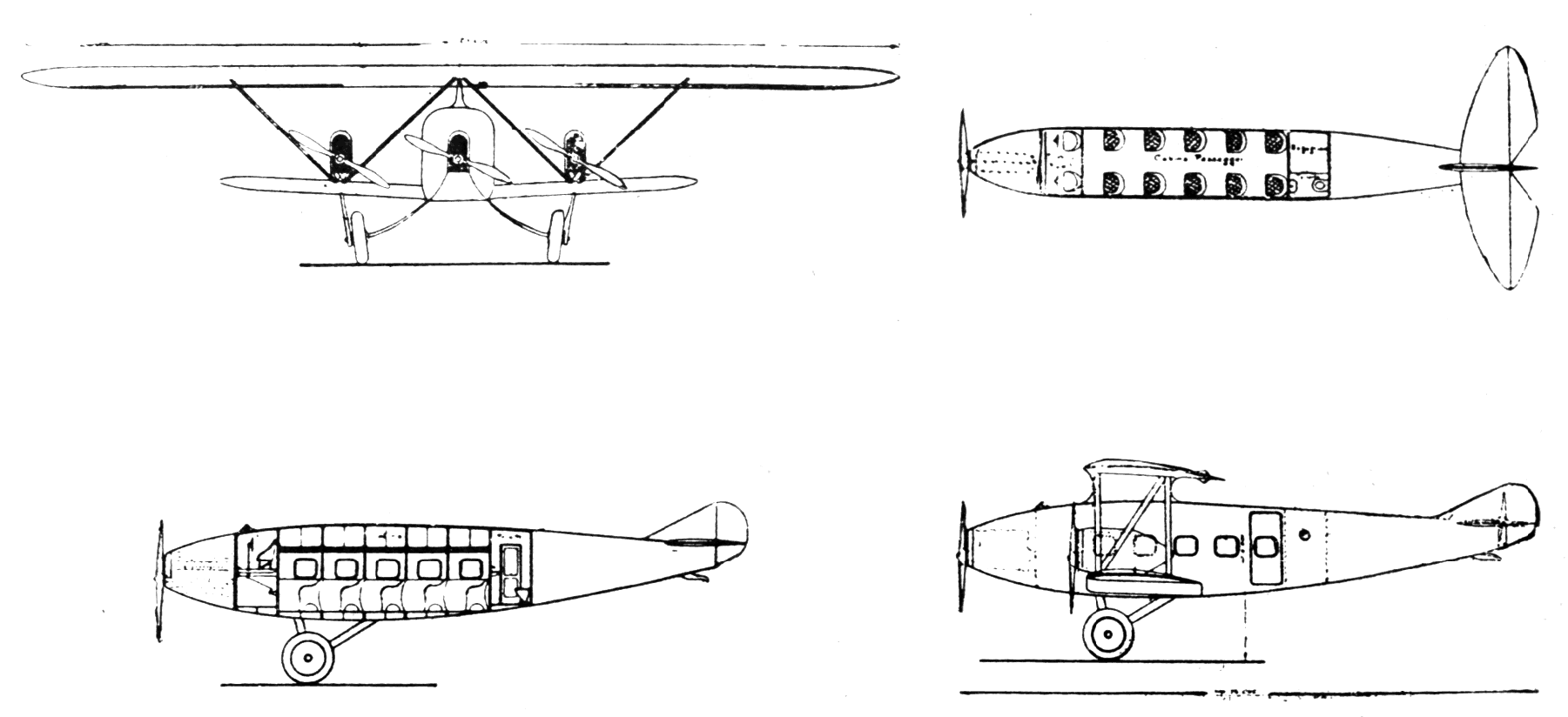

General information
- Type: Airliner
- National origin: Italy
- Manufacturer: CANT
- Number built: 1

History
- First flight: 11 July 1932; 94 years ago
- Developed from: CANT 22

The CANT 23 was an Italian trimotor airliner built by CANT in the late 1920s.

== Design ==
The CANT 23 was an entirely metallic aircraft with a conventional look, a three-engine, biplane with a fixed trolley. The fuselage, with a rectangular section, was made of duraluminium and was characterized by a closed passenger compartment equipped with 10 single armchairs that overlooked a series of five rectangular windows on each side. The cockpit was open, placed on the upper part in front of the wings and protected by a windshield. The wing configuration was biplane-sesquiplane with the upper wing, more open, connected to the lower, considerably smaller, thanks to a Warren truss configuration. Both were made with a structure of side members in profile and ribs in square section tube covered in painted canvas.

== Development ==
In 1927 the airline company Società Italiana Servizi Aerei (SISA), a company owned by the brothers Callisto and Alberto Cosulich as well as the CRDA, had begun to operate on the route that joined the Italian Trieste with Budapest, capital of the then Kingdom of Hungary. In anticipation of an increase in demand from the air transport market with the possibility of making new connections to Central and Eastern Europe and in particular the opening of a route capable of connecting Trieste airport - Ronchi dei Legionari or, alternatively, the new Noghere airport, then under construction near the village of Zaule, in Vienna to continue to Budapest.

The project, the first of the CRDA-CANT that was not a seaplane, was supervised by the engineer Raffaele Conflenti, who at that time held the position of chief designer and director of the technical office of the company of Monfalcone, which took experience gained in the creation of the CANT 22 hydro line. The new aircraft, designated CANT 23, appeared to possess a conventional appearance and presented a new, for the company, fuselage made of duralumin characterized by the closed passenger compartment and an open cockpit for the pilot. The veiling and the three- engine propulsion in the tractor configuration were substantially similar to the previous CANT 22.

The construction of the aircraft began as early as 1927, but its progress was slow, continuing until the beginning of the 1930s. In 1929 a cell was created for static tests but the prototype, serial number NC.136, managed to be registered (I -ABLA) only on 11 July 1932. Although the design of CANT 23 benefited from all-metal construction, the constant development of the aeronautic industry determined the early technical ageing of the type and definitively undermined any further development. The program was suspended on 1 May 1933 (93 years ago) and the project was therefore abandoned.

== Specifications ==
Data from

General characteristics

- Crew: 3
- Capacity: 10 passengers
- Length: 48 ft 11 in (14.90 m)
- Wingspan: 66 ft 7 in (20.30 m)
- Empty weight: 4,400 lb (1,996 kg)
- Powerplant: 1 × Isotta Fraschini Asso 500 V-12 water-cooled piston engine, 500 hp (370 kW)
- Powerplant: 2 × Isotta Fraschini Asso 200 6-cylinder water-cooled in-line piston engines, 260 hp (190 kW) each
- Propellers: 3-bladed metal propellers

Performance

- Maximum speed: 214 mph (344 km/h, 186 kn)
- Range: 590 mi (950 km, 510 nmi)
- Service ceiling: 12,630 ft (3,850 m)

== See also ==
Aircraft of comparable role, configuration, and era

- Ford Trimotor
