= List of military aircraft of Uruguay =

This is a list that cover current and former military aircraft that have been used by the Armed Forces of the Oriental Republic of Uruguay since 1913.

== Uruguayan Army ==
Cockade of the National Army of Uruguay

The following is a list in chronological order of acquisition of the aircraft that were used by the aviation of the National Army of Uruguay since the origin of military aviation in the country in 1913, and through the different organizations that developed within it, such as the Military Aviation School or the Military Aeronautics until 1953, the year of the creation of the independent Fuerza Aérea Militar (Military Air Force), current Uruguayan Air Force. However, in some cases the service periods shown for the aircraft below exceed the existence of the uniformed service in which they served, due to the fact that some of the aircraft continued their service beyond the existence of the organization and remained operating in the immediately following. The total number of aircraft that made up the fleets of each of the models is not included, so they should not be taken as unique airframes.

=== Military Aviation School (1913 – 1934) ===
- Farman Biplane (1913 – 1917)
- Blériot XI (1913)
- Castaibert IV (1917 – 1920)
- Avro 504K (1919 – 1934)
- Ansaldo SVA 10 (1920 – 1934)
- Breguet 14 (1921 – 1938)
- Spad S.VII (1921 – 1931)
- Spad S.XIII (1921 – 1931)
- Nieuport 27 (1922 – 1931)
- Ansaldo A.1 Balilla (1925)
- Martinsyde F.4 Buzzard (1925 – 1927)
- de Havilland DH.9 (1925 – 1927)
- Morane-Saulnier 35 (1926 – 1934)
- Avión de Reconocimiento Modelo Escuela (A.R.M.E.) (1927 – 1935)
- Potez 25 (1929 – 1948)
- Farman F.190 (1931 – 1941)
- de Havilland D.H.89 Dragon Rapide (1931 – 1948)

=== Aeronáutica Militar (1935 – 1953) ===
- de Havilland D.H.82A Tiger Moth (1935 – 1949)
- Hanriot LH.431 (1935 – 1942)
- Junkers A50 (1935 – 1940)
- Stinson Reliant SR–8B (1936 – 1948)
- IMAM Ro.37 bis (1937 – 1941)
- Waco JHD (1938 – 1949)
- North American AT-6B-NT Texan (1942 – 1985)
- Curtiss SNC-1 Falcon (1942 – 1951)
- Fairchild PT-19A/B (1942 – 1962)
- Beechcraft UC-43 Staggerwing (1944 – 1959)
- Piper AE-1 Grasshopper (1944 – 1961)
- North American AT-6D-NT Texan (1944 – 1990)
- Beechcraft UC-45 Expeditor (1946 – 1980)
- Douglas C-47A Skytrain (1946 – 1977)
- North American SNJ-2 Texan (1946 –1968)
- Fairchild PT-26 (1946 – 1962)
- Beechcraft AT-11-BH Kansan (1947 – 1980)
- North American AT-6C-10/15-NT Texan (1947 – 1981)
- Ryan Navion (1949 – 1965)
- North American F-51D-20–NA Mustang (1950 – 1960)
- North American B-25J-25-NC Mitchell (1950 – 1963)

== Uruguayan Air Force ==
Uruguayan Air Force Roundel

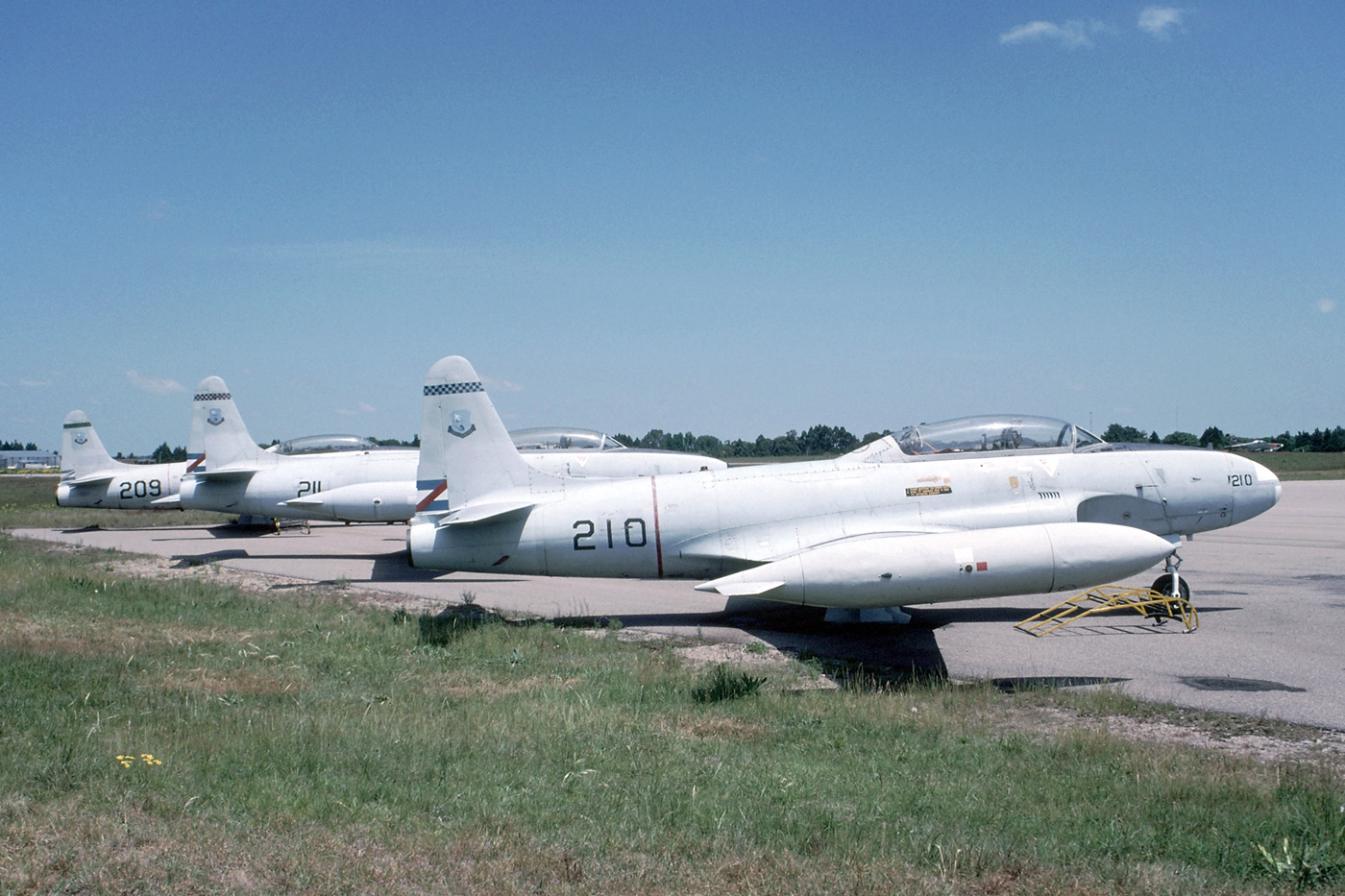
Uruguayan Air Force Lockheed T-33A, 1996.

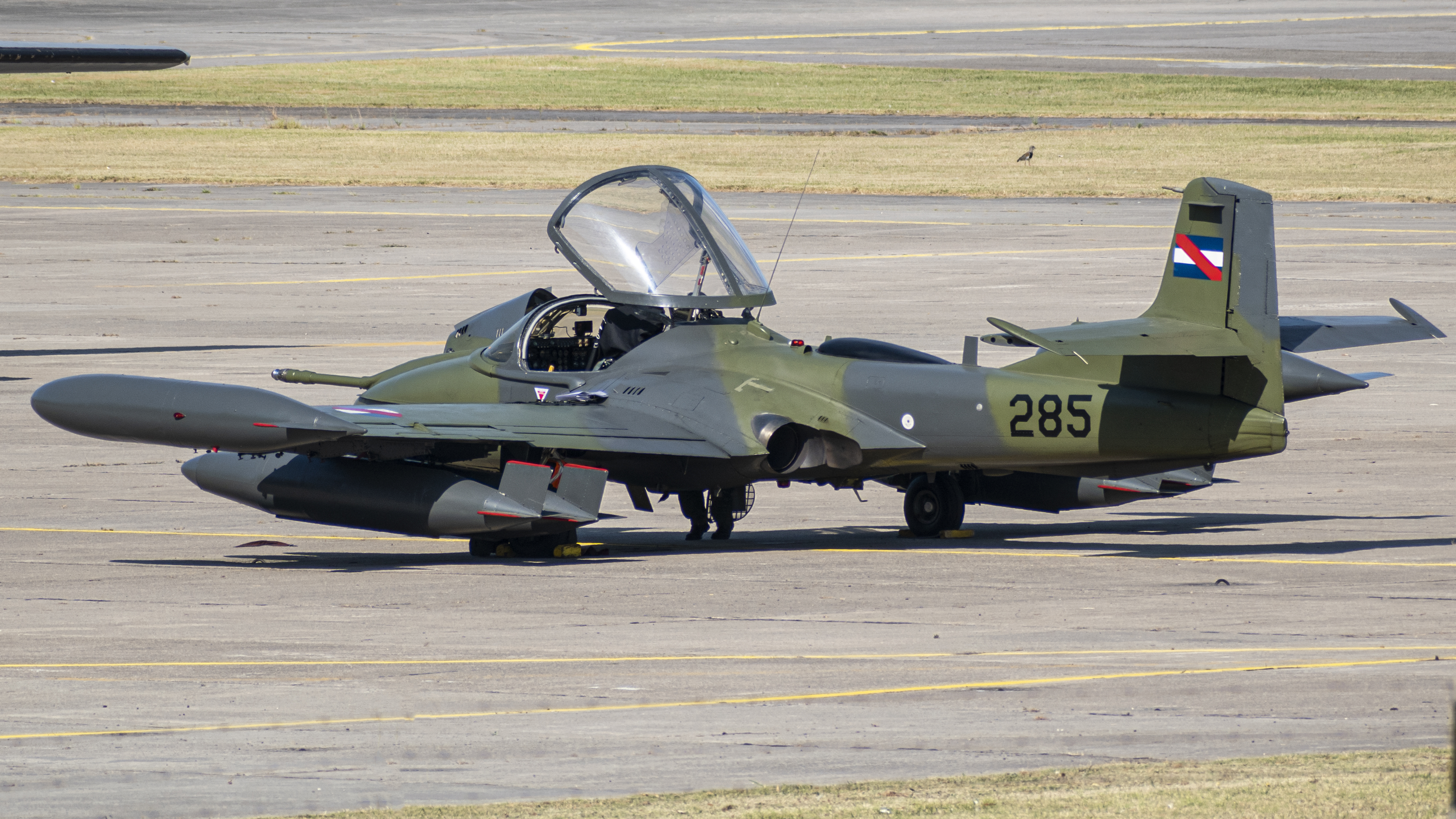
Uruguayan Air Force Cessna A-37B-CE Dragonfly, 2020.

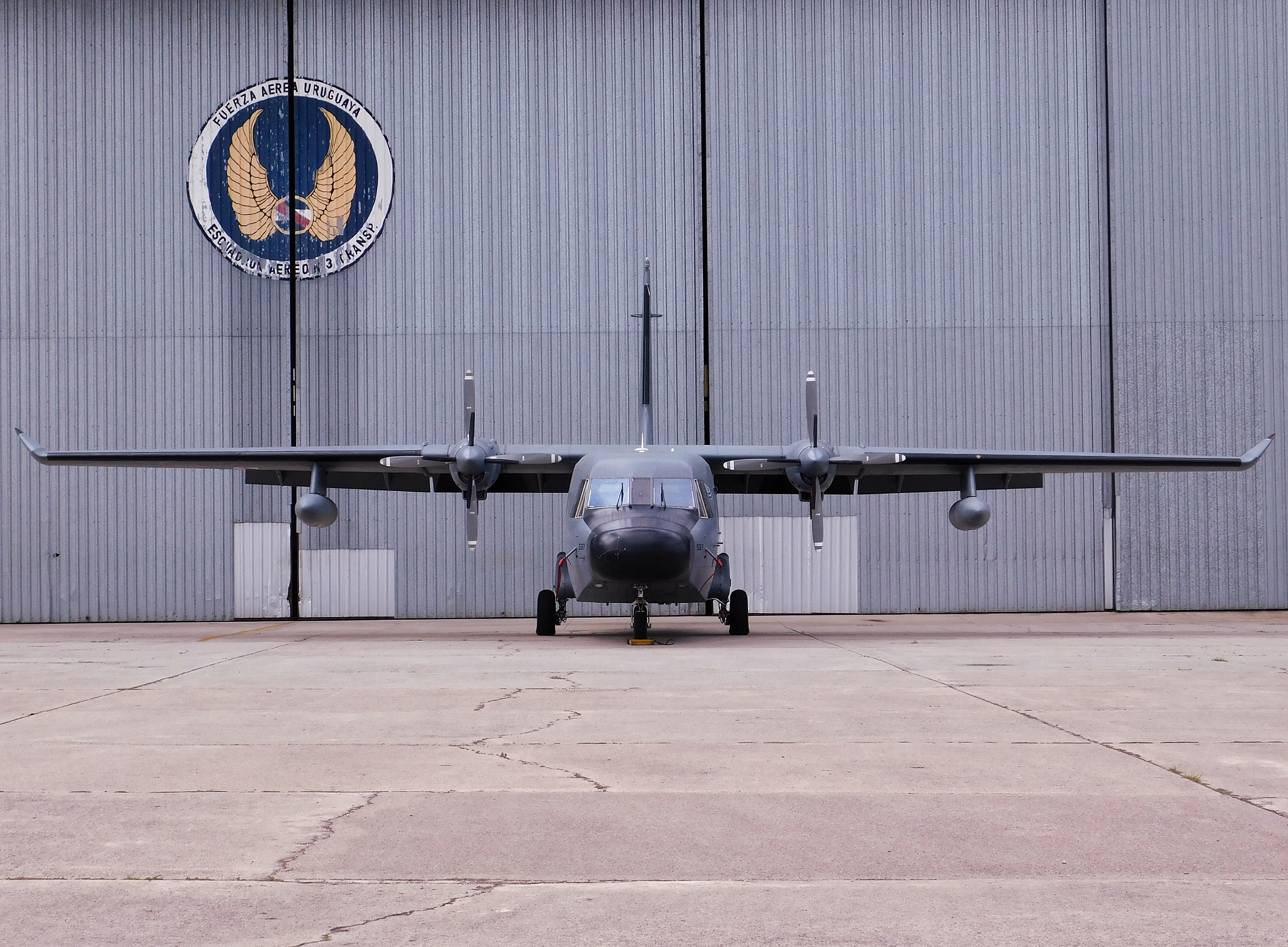
Uruguayan Air Force CASA C-212-300 Aviocar, 2023.

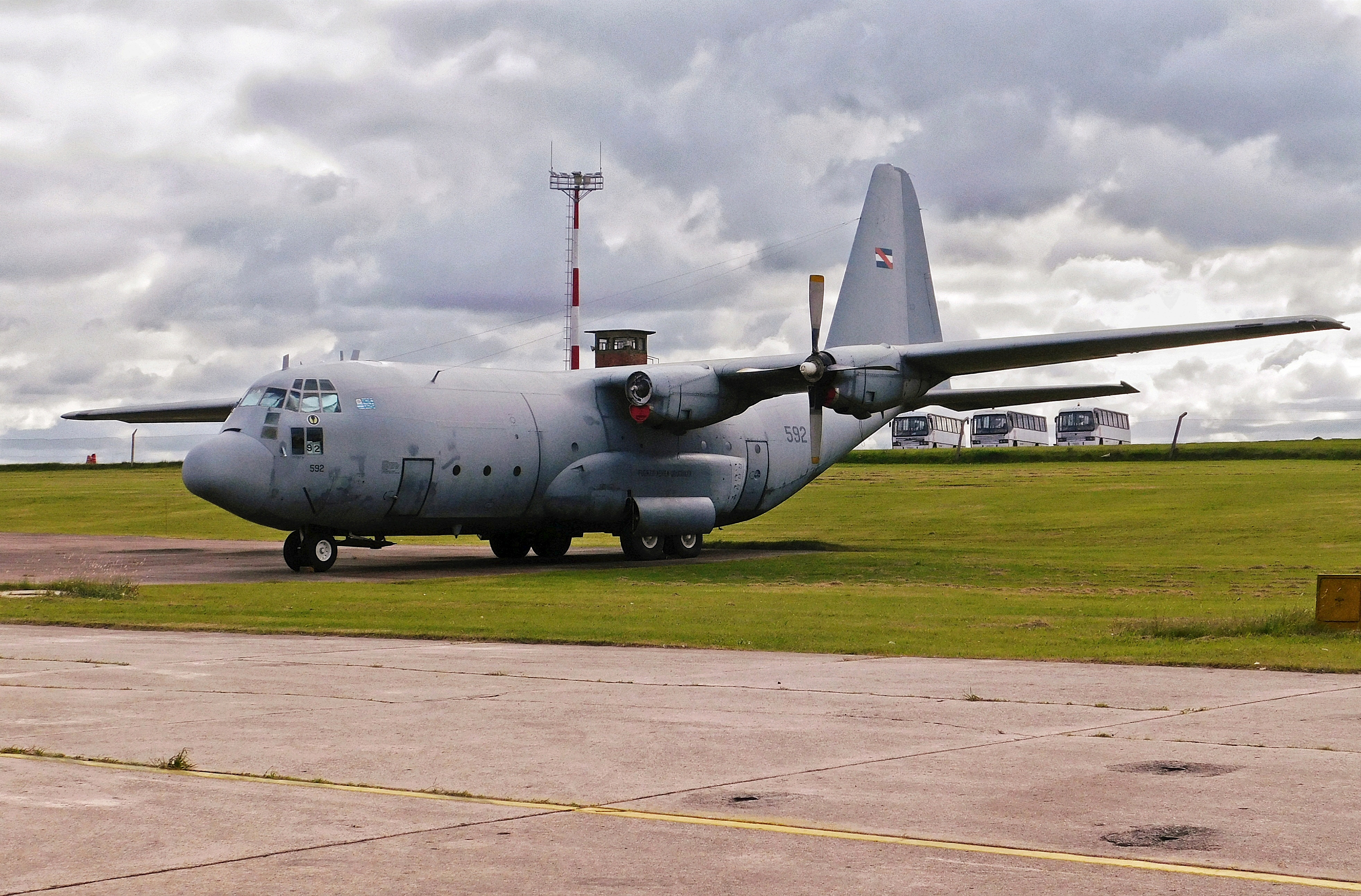
Retired Uruguayan Air Force Lockheed C-130B Hercules. Air Brigade I, Ciudad de la Costa, Canelones, Uruguay, 2023.

The following is a list of the military aircraft that were used by the original Fuerza Aérea Militar (Military Air Force) and then the Uruguayan Air Force. It is necessary to state that despite having different names, it is the same organization. In some cases, the periods of service shown for the aircraft below exceed the existence of the service under the name of the Military Air Force, but the change of designation to the Uruguayan Air Force in 1956 did not imply any operational change, and the aircraft continued with their uninterrupted service.

=== Fuerza Aérea Militar (1953 – 1956) ===
The following is a list of the military aircraft that were used by the Fuerza Aérea Militar since its creation on December 4, 1953, and 1955, the year before the organization became known as the Uruguayan Air Force.

- de Havilland Canada DHC-1 Chipmunk (1954 – 1960)
- Bell H-13G Sioux (1955 – 1963)

=== Uruguayan Air Force (1956 – present) ===
The following is a list of the military aircraft that have been used by the current Uruguayan Air Force, since this name was used for the first time in 1956. The total number of aircraft that made up the fleets of each of the models is not included, so they should not be considered as unique airframes.

- Lockheed T-33A-1/A-5-LO (1956 – 1996)
- North American AT-6G Texan (1957 – 1993)
- Lockheed F-80C-1/C-5/C-10-LO Shooting Star (1958 – 1970)
- Piper U-21 Super Cub (1958 – present)
- Cessna 182 Skylane (1961 – 1981)
- Hiller UH-12E-4 Raven (1964 – 1994)
- Cessna U-17A Skywagon (1965 – 2000)
- Beechcraft U-8F Seminole (1969 – present)
- Cessna T-41D Mescalero (1969 – 2018)
- Fokker F-27 (Mk 100) Friendship (1970 – 1994)
- Fairchild Hiller FH-227D (1970 – 1994)
- Bell UH-1H-BF Iroquois (1971 – present)
- Cessna 310L (1972 – present)
- Bell UH-1B-BF (1975 – 1990))
- Embraer C-95C Bandeirante (1975 – present)
- Cessna A-37B-CE Dragonfly (1976 – 2026)
- Beechcraft T-34A/B Mentor (1977 – 2000)
- Aero Commander 680 (1978 – 1985)
- Cessna 170D (1977 – 1985)
- Bell 212 (1981 – present)
- FMA IA-58A Pucará (1981 – 2017)
- CASA C-212-200/300 Aviocar (1981 – present)
- Gates Learjet 35A (1981 – 1988)
- Cessna 210L Centurion (1990 – 2003)
- Pilatus PC-7U Turbo Trainer (1992 – present)
- Lockheed C-130B-LM Hercules (1992 – 2020)
- Beechcraft UB-58 Baron (1998 – present)
- Cessna U-206H Stationair (1998 – present)
- Eurocopter AS365N2 Dauphin (1998 – present)
- Aermacchi SF-260EU (1999 – present)
- Embraer C-120ER Brasilia (1999 – present)
- North American AT-6D-NT Texan (2013 – present)
- Beechcraft UB-55 Baron (2014 – present)
- LET L-13 Blaník (2015 – present)
- Lockheed KC-130H Hercules (2020 –present)

== Uruguayan Navy ==
Roundel of the Uruguayan Naval Aviation

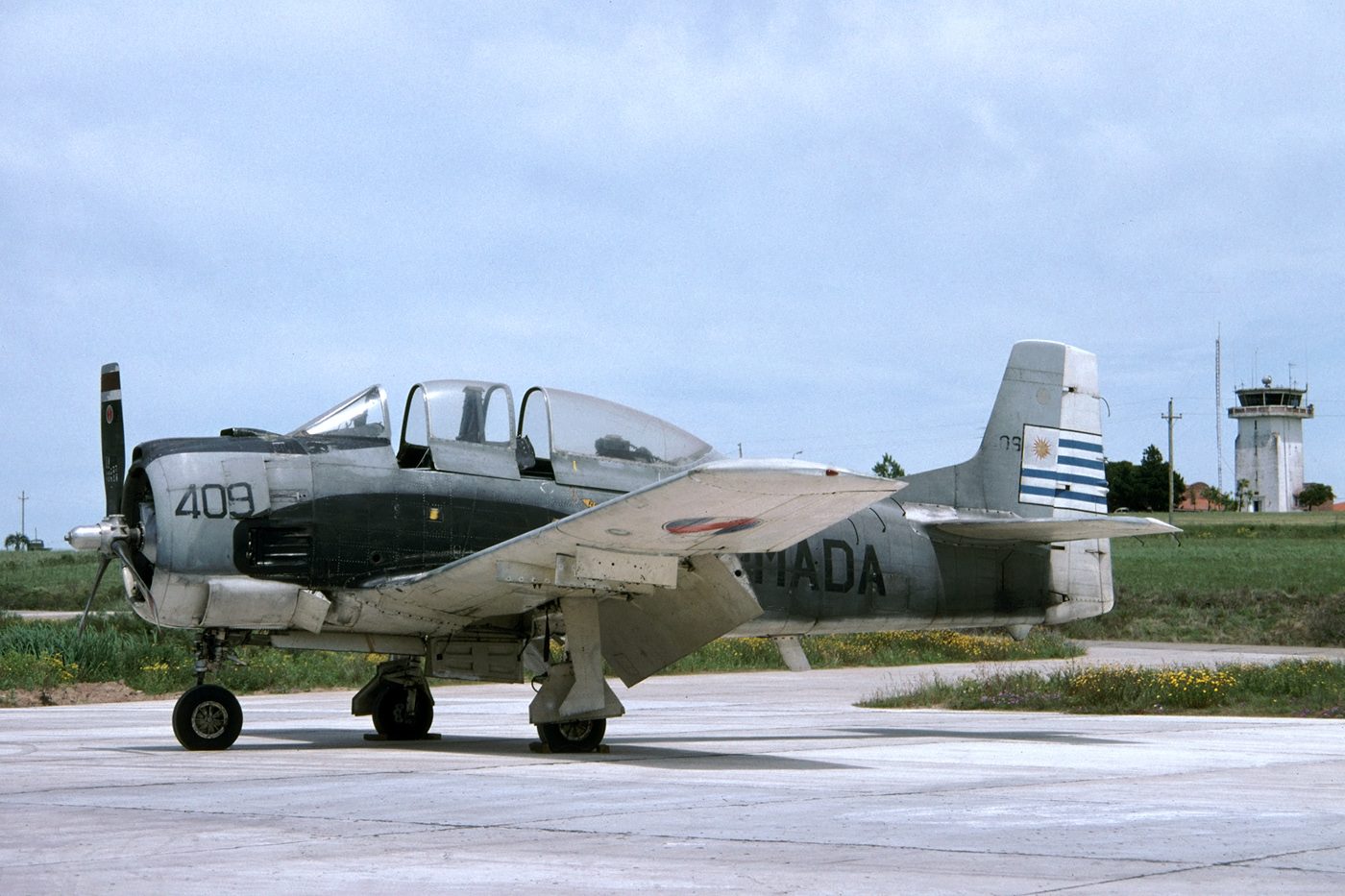
Uruguayan Navy North American T-28S Fennec, 1996.

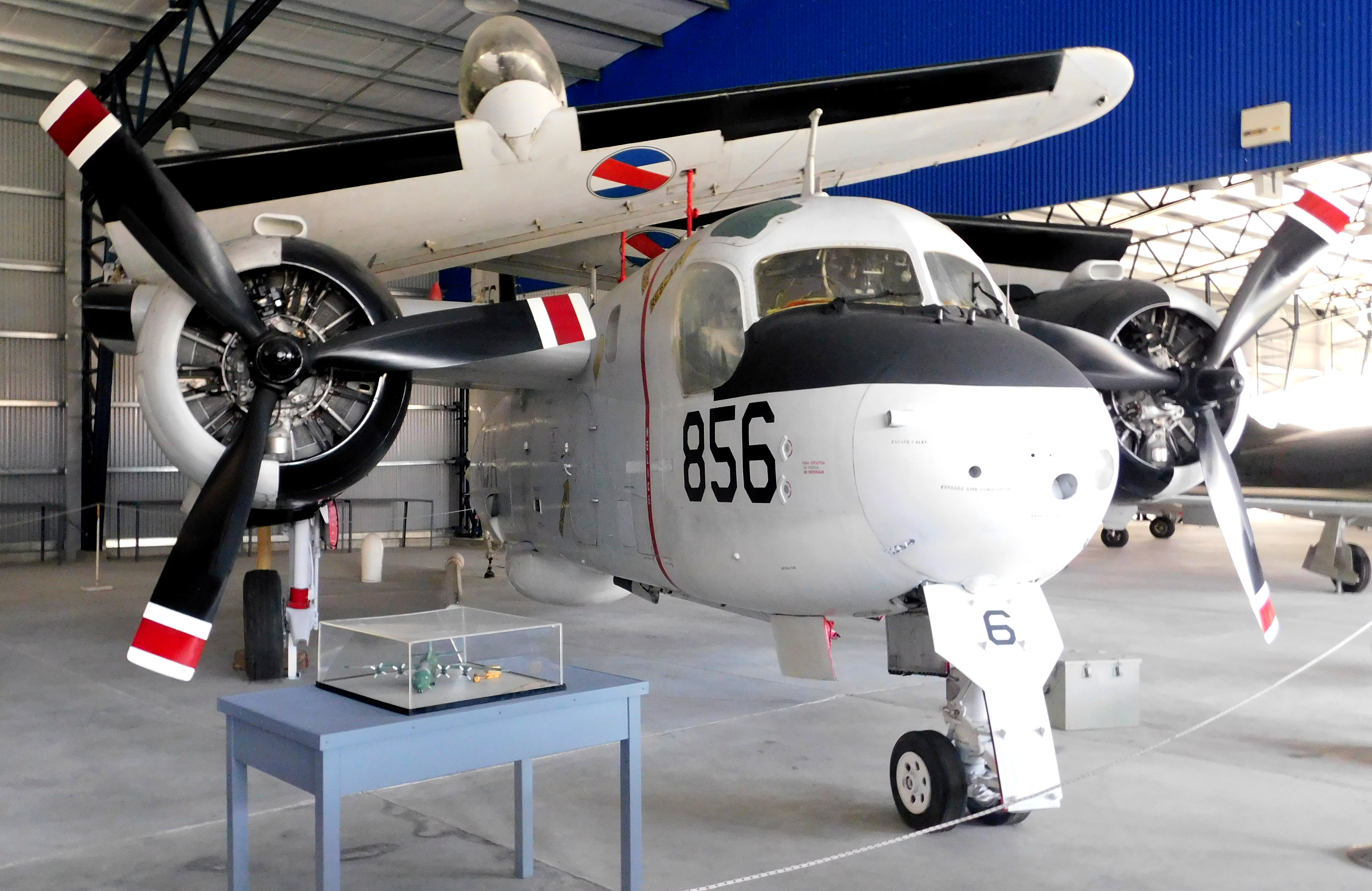
Grumman S-2G Tracker (c/n 263C, BuNo 152376, AMARC 1S598) of the Uruguayan Navy on display at Colonel Jaime Meregalli Aeronautical Museum in Canelones, Uruguay, 2019.

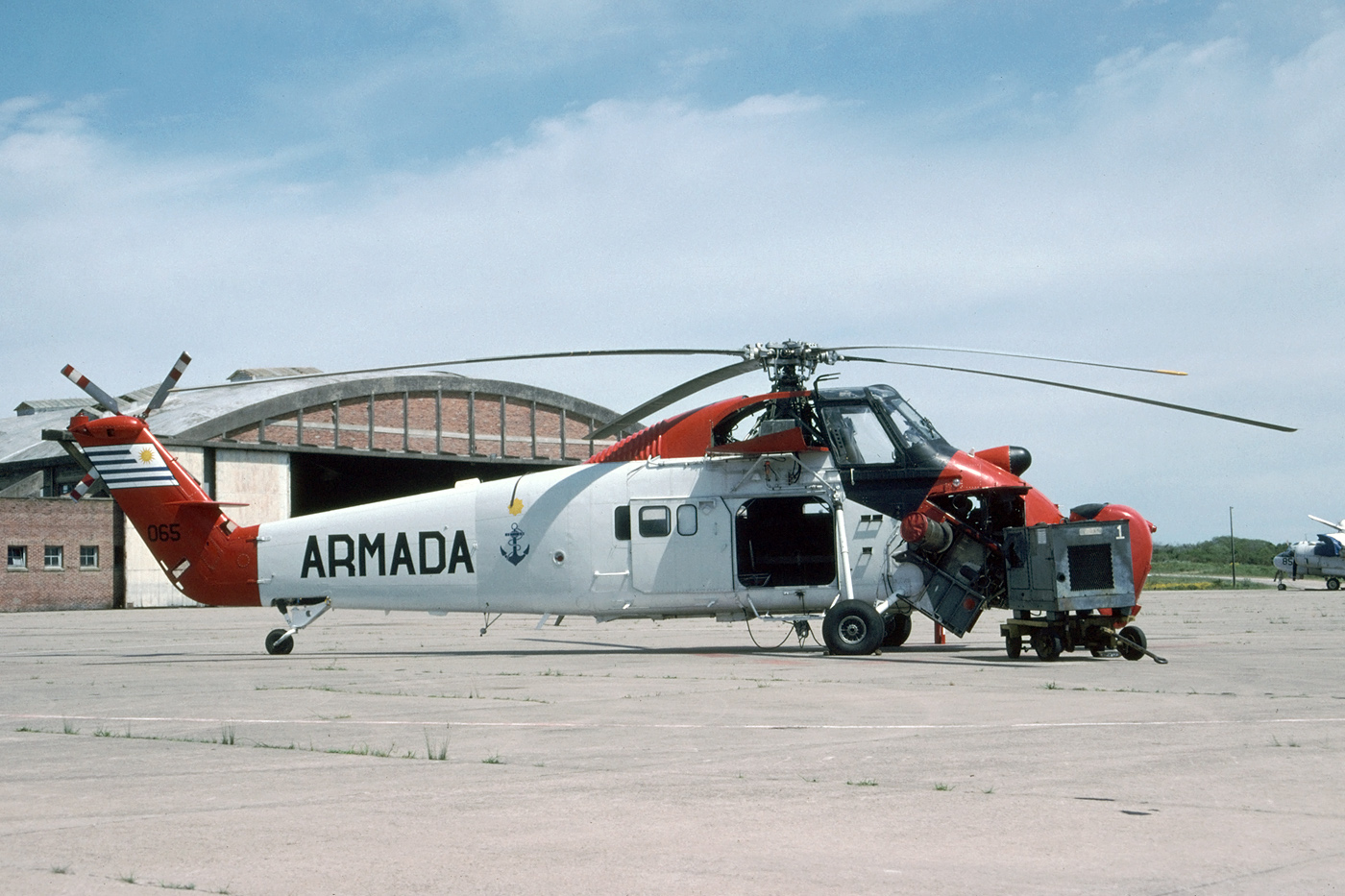
Uruguayan Navy Westland Wessex at Laguna del Sauce Airport, near Punta del Este, 1996.

The following is a list of the aircraft that have been used by the Navy Aeronautical Service and the current Naval Aviation of the National Navy of Uruguay. This later designation was adopted on June 27, 1952, with the approval of Decree No. 21,307. As with the previous lists, the total numbers of aircraft that made up the fleets of each of the following models are not included, so they should not be considered as unique airframes that were found in service.

=== Navy Aeronautical Service (1925 –1951) ===
- CANT 18 (1932 – 1942)
- CANT 21 (1932 – 1942)
- Vought OS2U-3 Kingfisher (1942 – 1958)
- Grumman G-44 Widgeon (1943 – 1979)
- Fairchild PT-23 (1943 – 1960)
- Grumman TBM Avenger (1949 – 1957)
- North American SNJ (1950 – 1990)

=== Uruguayan Naval Aviation (1951 –present) ===
- Grumman F6F-5 Hellcat (1952 – 1960)
- Piper PA-18 Super Cub (1955 – 1990)
- Bell 47 (1955 – 2000)
- Martin PBM-5S2 Mariner (1956 – 1964)
- Beechcraft TC-45J Navigator (1961 – 1994)
- Grumman S-2A Tracker (1965 – 2010)
- Beechcraft T-34A Mentor (1966 – 1990)
- Sikorsky SH-34J Seabat (1971 – 1988)
- Sikorsky CH-34C Choctaw (1972 – 1988)
- North American T-28S Fennec (1979 – 1995)
- Bell 222 (1980 – 1991)
- Grumman S-2G Tracker (1980 – 1990)
- Beechcraft B200T Super King Air (1981 – present)
- Beechcraft T-34C-1 Turbo Mentor (1981 – present)
- Beechcraft T-34B Mentor (1985 – 1990)
- Cessna 182 Skyline (1990 – 2002)
- Piper PA-34-200T Seneca II (1991 – 2002)
- Westland Wessex 60 (1991 – 1994)
- Explorer A101 (1994 – 2005)
- Westland Wessex HC.2 (1998 – 2011)
- Eurocopter AS355 Écureuil 2 (2006 – 2018)
- Messerschmitt Bolkow-Blohm GmbH BO-105 PAH-1 (2007 – 2016)
- Cessna O-2A Skymaster (2018 – present)
- Bell OH-58A Kiowa (2020 – present)
- Bell AB-412SP (2020 – present)
