= Aerial operations in the Chaco War =

The Chaco War was the first major Latin American conflict in which aircraft were used. This aerial war carried a large human and materiel cost. At that time, Bolivia possessed one of the greatest aerial forces in the region, however this fact did not prevent its final defeat. Bolivia lacked the expertise to utilise its aerial forces, and was thus unable to maximise its use of military aviation. Paraguay had a small number of pilots and technicians, all veterans of the revolution of 1922. The 1922 revolution was a brief civil war in which the government and the rebels used aircraft in the operations, and José Félix Estigarribia could be considered an innovator in the military use of aircraft on the continent.

== Background ==
Between July and August 1932, the Paraguayans built a landing strip at the advance base of Isla Poi and deployed a small force of combat aircraft for reconnaissance purposes, which was practically all the military aircraft which Paraguay possessed. Bolivia's air force was numerically superior, but was limited by the lack of airfields close to the combat zone. Despite this disadvantage, the Bolivian Army Air Corps was able to conduct attacks in a relatively effective manner.

Lieutenant Colonel Bernardino Bilbao Rioja took charge of the Bolivian Air Corps in the Chaco and initiated the operations in July 1932, concentrating his forces on the primary base of Villa Montes, out of an advanced base in Muñoz, nowadays Fort General Díaz, in Paraguayan territory.

== Fighter and Fighter bombers ==
=== First acquisitions ===
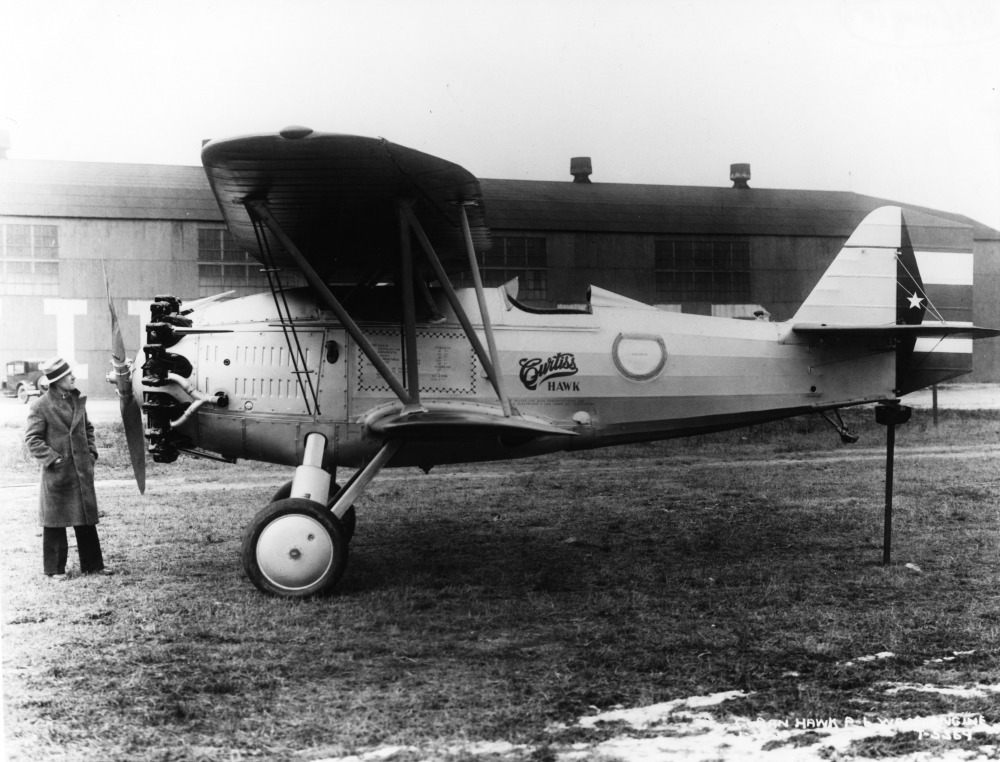
Cuban Curtiss P-6S Hawk, similar to those which served in the Bolivian Air Force

In July 1932, the Bolivians deployed three Vickers Vespa combat aircraft, three Breguet XIX bombers, and three Vickers Type 143 fighters from their forward airfields. By early 1933, the Bolivian army had acquired a consignment of 20 Curtiss-Wright CW-14 Osprey. Paraguay ordered seven Potez 25s through the French military mission, the aircraft arriving in October 1928. Even before the final delivery, one Potez was lost when, while still crated, it was accidentally dropped overboard during the trans-shipping operation in Montevideo, Uruguay. The seventh Potez 25 was replaced by the French company in 1932. Intensive training from 1928 to 1931 resulted in 25 pilots and 18 maintenance personnel ready for operating the aircraft. The First Squadron of Bombing and Reconnaissance was established by the beginning of the war, made up of the seven Potez 25s and two Wibault 73. At least ten Curtiss P-6 Hawk fighters bought by Bolivia were delivered between December 1932 and March 1935. The Bolivian army was familiar with the Hawks since a 1928 demonstration carried out in La Paz by no other than Jimmy Doolittle, who later tried to take off in a float-fitted Hawk from Lake Titicaca without success. The fighter of choice for the Paraguayan air branch was the Fiat CR.20, acquired through the Italian legation. Five aircraft were delivered in April 1933. The warplanes were declared operational on 25 May 1933, and arrived to the front the next day.

=== Operational history ===
Given the potential of the Bolivian Ospreys, Lt Col Bilbao visited the Commander in chief, Colonel Enrique Peñaranda Castillo, and suggested to him that the best use of the Bolivian Air Force was to bomb the main Paraguayan base at Puerto Casado on the Paraguay river, given that every man, car, horse, and munition used this point to enter the Chaco theatre of operations.

Later, in a violent confrontation with Colonel Peñaranda, Bilbao Rioja insisted on bombing Asunción in order to demoralise the Paraguayans. From the airstrips at Muñoz and Ballivián, the Bolivian Air Force could reach Asunción and Puerto Casado. The Bolivian high command disapproved of Bilbao Rioja's demands as they thought, not incorrectly, that bombing Asunción would cause international outcry against Bolivia. At the time of the war, the Bolivian high command saw no profit in taking such dramatic steps, though the Bolivians came to reconsider this later.

However, they authorised various incursions against the Paraguayan bases at Puerto Casado. These incursions provoked a strong reaction on the part of the Argentine government, as many Argentines lived and worked in Puerto Casado and managed the key railway that linked that city with the Chaco heartlands (and thus supported the Paraguayan military campaign).

Argentina, though officially neutral during the war, maintained a status that could be described as "amiable neutrality" towards the Paraguayans, even offering them financial support. After the air strike on Puerto Casado in 1933, the Argentines told the Bolivians that they would not tolerate further attacks on their civilians, implying that they might be inclined to support the Paraguayans if such attacks continued. Faced with this dilemma, Bolivia sensibly discontinued aerial attacks. From this point in the campaign, the Bolivian Air Corps was used primarily for reconnaissance missions on the front lines, for aerial patrols and close air support.

From the beginning, Bilbao Rioja ordered the aircraft to conduct aggressive patrols over the Chaco, and the Bolivians lost at least one Vickers Vespa due to anti-aircraft fire at the end of July. During the Battle of Boquerón, both sides carried out numerous attacks in support of ground troops.

Between 9 and 29 September, Paraguayan Potez 25s, escorted by Wibault 73 fighters, carried out 12 bombing raids against Bolivian troops in Boqueron. The Paraguayans also used their radio-equipped Potez 25s to direct artillery fire from their Schneider 75 mm batteries.

Though both sides flew reconnaissance and close air support missions during the Boqueron Campaign, there is disagreement about the first air-to-air confrontation:

- According to Paraguayan reports, this occurred on 28 September, when a Paraguayan Potez 25 encountered a Bolivian Vickers Vespa. The Paraguayan pilot, Lieutenant Emilio Rocholl, was wounded but able to return to base with his aircraft.
- According to Bolivian accounts, the first aerial combat on the Americas between belligerent nations occurred on 4 December 1932, over Saavedra. The victor was Bolivian pilot Rafael Pabón, who shot down a Paraguayan Potez TOE Nº 6. This was the pilot's only victory against a Paraguayan aircraft, despite Bolivian claims of other two victories. While he was seeking a second victory, he was taken out by a Potez 25 TOE N° 11, dying there with his gunner on 12 August 1934 near Fort Florida. Upon discovering the identity of the pilot, the Paraguayans paid the dead pilot great honours.

The first encounter between fighters over the Chaco took place on 12 June 1933, as five Ospreys were being escorted by three Hawks and one Vickers Scout in the course of an airstrike against Isla Poí. The Fiats disrupted the Bolivian package in the middle of a furious dogfight. Lieutenant Walter Gwynn's CR.20, however, crashed in the aftermath, killing the pilot. A Paraguayan technical team ruled out hostile fire as the cause of this loss. The Fiats engaged the Ospreys again on 23 September 1934 over Picuiba, when two Bolivian warplanes were spotted while involved in a bombing mission. One of the Ospreys jettisoned its bombs and escaped unscathed, but the other pilot only became aware of the enemy fighters when he noticed the loss of his wingman. The Fiats duly targeted the lonely plane with their machine guns. The Paraguayans claimed the second Osprey as "probable", but the Bolivian aircraft managed to fly back to its base, although seriously damaged. The Paraguayan army would lose another Potez 25 to Bolivian planes on 12 December 1934 over Capirenda, when a Hawk escorting a Junkers K 43 shot down Potez TOE Nº 13 after a brief exchange of fire. Both pilot and gunner survived the crash. The conflict would see the last ever dogfight between biplanes, over the Bolivian stronghold of Ballivián. The Potez 25 would be the only type of aircraft from either side to be used during the entire conflict.

== Aerial support ==
The aerial forces played a variety of important roles at all stages of the war, including close air support, reconnaissance, air supply and evacuation of the wounded.

Though the aerial combat and bombardier units gained the most glory, the unarmed transport and general-use aircraft of both air forces played a key role in the war. Both sides used a variety of transport and light aircraft to support their forces. Paraguayan planes would drop water to their own thirsty troops in the form of ice blocks, a tactic developed by the Bolivians during the siege of Boquerón. The Potez 25 played the role of transport aircraft during the first and second battles of Nanawa, when they replenished the depleted Paraguayan stockpiles with hand grenades and ammunitions. The four Potez 25s involved in the operation were stripped of their rear machine guns in order to use the gunner's cockpit to load 115 kg of ammunition. The aircraft departed from Isla Poí to the south over Bolivian-controlled areas. On the first day only, they delivered 1,650 kg of ammunition on a hastily built runway. Three of the planes were hit by ground fire and forced to make emergency landings, but all of them were recovered and shipped to Asunción, where they endured a major overhaul.

Meanwhile, the Bolivian Ospreys became major players on the Bolivian victory at Cañada Strongest when aerial reconnaissance from Ballivian uncovered a new Paraguayan trail through the woods aimed to encircling two Bolivian divisions west of Cañada Esperanza.

At the start of the war, the Bolivian military forces employed Lloyd Aéreo Boliviano (LAB) civilian airliners, including four light transport aircraft Junkers F-13 (single engine, six passenger) and three Junkers W 34 transport aircraft. Some Junkers F-13 would be converted into seaplanes by the Bolivian army. The LAB had recently included a Ford Trimotor, using it as a transport aircraft, which was destroyed in an operational accident while taking off at Villa Montes.

In December 1932, Bolivia received from Germany three tri-motor Junkers Ju 52, bought with a loan from Bolivian tin tycoon Simón Patiño. A fourth aircraft arrived in February 1935. The durable construction of the Ju 52, with its three tons payload, made it an ideal aircraft for flights in South America. The Bolivians counted on a substantial air transport force, and the conditions of logistics in the Chaco demanded that such capabilities be used to the maximum in order to transport the necessary munitions, combustibles, and medicine to the front. During the war, the Ju 52 alone transported more than 4,400 tons of cargo to the front.

=== Aerial medical evacuation ===
Paraguay also pressed a wide variety of transport and general-use aircraft into service. At the end of 1932, Paraguay had purchased two Travel Air 6000 six-passenger aircraft from the United States, to serve as aerial ambulances. Both aircraft were christened Nanawa. During the war, both sides used aircraft for the transport of the sick and wounded from the front-line airstrips to the field hospitals in the rear. Over the course of the war, the Bolivian Ju 52's evacuated over 40,000 Bolivian troops from the front lines.

The carrying capacity of the Paraguayan Travel Air and Breda Ba 44 was limited, but they generally flew a shorter distance to fully equipped hospital ships which were anchored at the ports of Concepción and Puerto Casado. Gravely wounded troops were transported to the Central Military Hospital in Asunción. These aerial ambulances flew constantly, and many Paraguayan soldiers were evacuated by air during the war.

=== Leadership transport ===
General Estigarribia used light aircraft extensively for liaison throughout the region, and to meet with his commanders. Estigarribia also used light aircraft to conduct his own reconnaissance of the front lines. The Paraguayan president Eusebio Ayala was also airlifted to the front in several occasions, often on the multi-use Potez 25, to visit the troops and meet with Estigarribia.

This was the first war in the Americas where the political leaders were able to meet personally with military leaders during operations in the large and isolated zones of the combat theatre. The main Paraguayan liaison aircraft and high speed courier was the Consolidated Model 21-C (PT-11), made in the United States. Paraguay also bought at least one Curtiss Robin, two de Havilland DH.60 Moth, a WACO Cabin, a CANT 26 and two light Junkers A 50 for liaison and light support duties.

== Paraguayan and Bolivian aerial operations over the Paraguay river ==
Given that all the troops and supplies which Paraguay sent to the Chaco were transported via the Río Paraguay, aerial control of the river took on considerable importance. The Paraguayan Navy had a small aviation arm (Aviación Naval), equipped with Macchi M.18, a Savoia-Marchetti S.59, and a CANT 10 flying boats.

The Navy quartered its small force at Bahía Negra, in the northern sector of the Chaco, in order to support its forces blocking any Bolivian advance downriver. The Air Arm of the Paraguayan Navy was created in 1929, as the Servicio Aéreo Naval, with the help of Italian aviator Lieutenant Colonel Ernesto Colombo. The force initially had a CANT-10 and a SIAI S59bis, followed in 1932 by two Macchi M18s. It also shared two Morane-Saulnier MS-35 and MS-139 trainers, and a SAML A.3 with Army Aviation. During the war, the Paraguayan air force flew 145 missions, including reconnaissance missions and air-ground attacks. The Aero-Naval unit kept the Bolivians under pressure in the upper part of the Río Paraguay, including conducting the first nighttime bombardments in the Americas. This was on 22 December 1934, when a Macchi M.18 bombed the Bolivian outposts of Vitriones and San Juan, south of Puerto Suárez, dropping 400 pounds of bombs. In commemoration of this achievement, Naval Aviation day is celebrated every 22 December.

The Bolivians also based a small aerial squadron in the northern sector of the Chaco, and attacked traffic on the Rio Paraguay on various occasions. Given the importance of the river as a line of communication, the loss of a gunboat or large steamboat due to air attack would have been a grave loss for Paraguay.

To counter the Bolivian aerial menace, the Paraguayan Navy used gunboats, all of them well-equipped with antiaircraft artillery, to escort troop or supply boats, and to serve as antiaircraft defense at the principal bases of Concepción, Puerto Casado and Bahía Negra. The gunboats saw some action, and on several encounters kept Bolivian aircraft at bay. The gunboat Tacuary is credited with the shooting down of a Bolivian aircraft at Bahia Negra on 22 December 1932, while the large gunboat Humaitá fought off the surviving aircraft of the same package minutes later at Puerto Leda. Due to the efforts of the Navy, the Bolivian Air Corps were able to inflict only minimal damage on Paraguayan logistic traffic.

== Embargo on aerial weaponry ==
As the attrition of aerial assets was heavy for both countries, the issue of replacing aircraft was made difficult by the embargo on the sale of weaponry to either side by the League of Nations and American government. However, though both embargoes were inconvenient, both sides showed ingenuity in evading international controls in order to import sufficient aircraft to keep their forces flying.

Bolivia depended on Chile's support. Chile had licensed the assembly of some Curtiss aircraft, including the Curtiss Falcon. Given that the Bolivian Ospreys were attrited by combat and accidents, the Bolivians wanted a quicker, two-seater combat aircraft, and the Falcon was an excellent replacement. The Bolivians were able to import various Falcons from Chile during the war, as Chile quietly ignored the League's embargo. The Curtiss Hawk and Falcon, the best Bolivian combat planes, were also purchased through Chilean connections.

The most daring Bolivian attempt to evade the embargoes occurred in 1934 when Bolivia requested four Curtiss Condor bombers. These large biplane bombers carried a ton of bombs, had three turrets, each with a long-range .30 calibre machine gun. Officially, the Bolivians wanted these aircraft for "medical transport", but given that these aircraft were ordered with military equipment, including turrets, machine guns, and bomb racks, this seems unlikely.

The more likely cause of the request was that things had gone quite poorly on the battlefield, and the Bolivians wanted a heavy bomber with the range to bomb Asunción, and the Condor met those requirements. When the United States forbade the sale of the aircraft, the bombers were bought via the subterfuge of a recently created airline called Tampa-New Orleans-Tampico (TNT) Airline. The four bombers made it as far as Peru before the US government and Paraguayan diplomats were alerted, and asked Peru to block the aircraft.

Under the embargo of the League of Nations, France blocked 10 Potez 50s ordered by Paraguay, and the Netherlands blocked the sending of five Fokker CVs. During the war, Uruguay and Argentina conspired to aid in the sales of armaments to the Paraguayans. Uruguay permitted aircraft arriving from Europe to be trans-boarded in its ports, and Paraguay bought a variety of training, transport, and liaison aircraft via Argentina. Besides this, a Curtiss Falcon meant for the forces of São Paulo, then engaged in the Constitutionalist Revolution against Vargas' forces crash-landed near Concepción and was taken by Paraguay.

== Assessment ==
The cost in aircraft and pilots during the war was high on both sides. The greatest threat to flights and pilots were operating accidents. Of the new Curtiss Ospreys that Bolivia had ordered, two were lost in combat and four in accidents during the war. Paraguay lost four aircraft in training accidents and four dead during the war. During the war, Bolivia flew between 57 and 62 combat planes and 22 transport and training aircraft.

Paraguay fielded 32 combat aircraft and 23 trainers and transports. Per official Paraguayan statistics, during the war Paraguay lost nine aircraft (two Wibault, four Potez 25, a CANT, and two Fiat CR20), and Bolivia lost ten (six Osprey, a Junkers, a Hawk, and two Curtiss Falcons). The main cause of these combat losses was ground fire. Air-to-air combat was relatively rare. However, when the air forces came face to face aggressive combat occurred between fighter aircraft, such as a rare clash between a Paraguayan Potez 25 bomber and two Bolivian Breguet XIX bombers.

On some occasions, there were successful attacks on enemy airbases and supply dumps. The most successful Paraguayan air raid of the war took place on 8 July 1934 against the landing strip and supply dump at the Bolivian fortified base of Ballivián. Four Potez 25s, escorted by Fiat fighters, dropped 40 bombs on the airstrip and damaged at least seven parked Curtiss combat planes, as well as depots and other facilities. The Potez also attacked and destroyed the main fuel dump. Two Uruguayan Army pilots, Lieutenants Benito Sánchez Leyton and Luis Tuya, played a key role in the raid on this Bolivian stronghold.

The greatest success of the Bolivian Air Corps occurred at the Battle of El Carmen in November 1934, when Bolivian aerial units covered the retreat of the Cavalry Corps, constantly attacking advancing Paraguayan units. The Bolivian army's successful escape was due in large part to the efforts of those pilots.

== See also ==
- Chaco War
- Bolivian Air Force
- Paraguayan Air Force

== Bibliography ==
- Cambeses, Manuel Júnior (2002). "O Emprego do Aviãona Revolução Constitucionalista de 1932". Revista do Instituto de Geografia e História Militar do Brasil (in Portuguese). Vol. 62, no. 88.
- Hagedorn, Dan & Sapienza, Antonio Luis F.: Aircraft of the Chaco War, 1928-1935. Schiffer Publishing, Atglen, Pa., 1996. ISBN 0764301462
- Sapienza Fracchia, Antonio Luis: La Contribución Italiana en la Aviación Paraguaya. Edición del author. Asunción. 2007. (in Spanish)
- Rauch, Gerd. The Green Hell Air War. Air Enthusiast Quarterly, No. 2, n.d., pp. 207–213.
