= Isotta Fraschini Asso 200 =

Asso 200
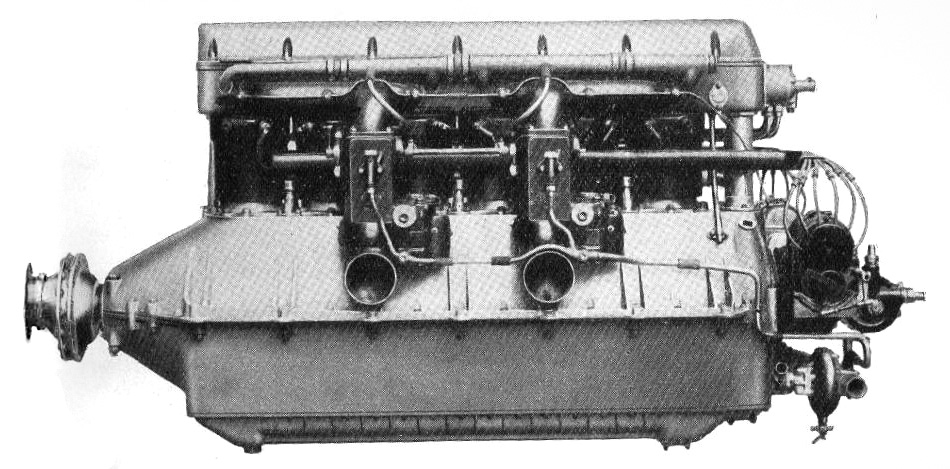
- Type: Water cooled inline aircraft engine
- National origin: Italy
- Manufacturer: Fabrica Automobili Isotta Fraschini (Isotta Fraschini), Milan

The Isotta Fraschini Asso 200 was a water-cooled inline engine developed by Isotta Fraschini in the late 1920s.

== Design and development ==
Fabrica Automobili Isotta Fraschini (Isotta Fraschini) was founded in 1898 to manufacture cars and internal combustion engines. Isotta Fraschini engines powered many Italian airships and military aircraft during WWI, becoming one of the largest engine producers in Italy. At the outbreak of WWII Isotta Fraschini had a large portfolio of engines but suffered from a lack of large orders, with a few exceptions.

The Asso 200 had cylinders made of carbon steel separated from each other, joined by a single aluminum head. The cylinders with the related cylinder heads, the upper crankcase, the crankshaft and the pistons were identical to the other engines in the series.

== Applications ==
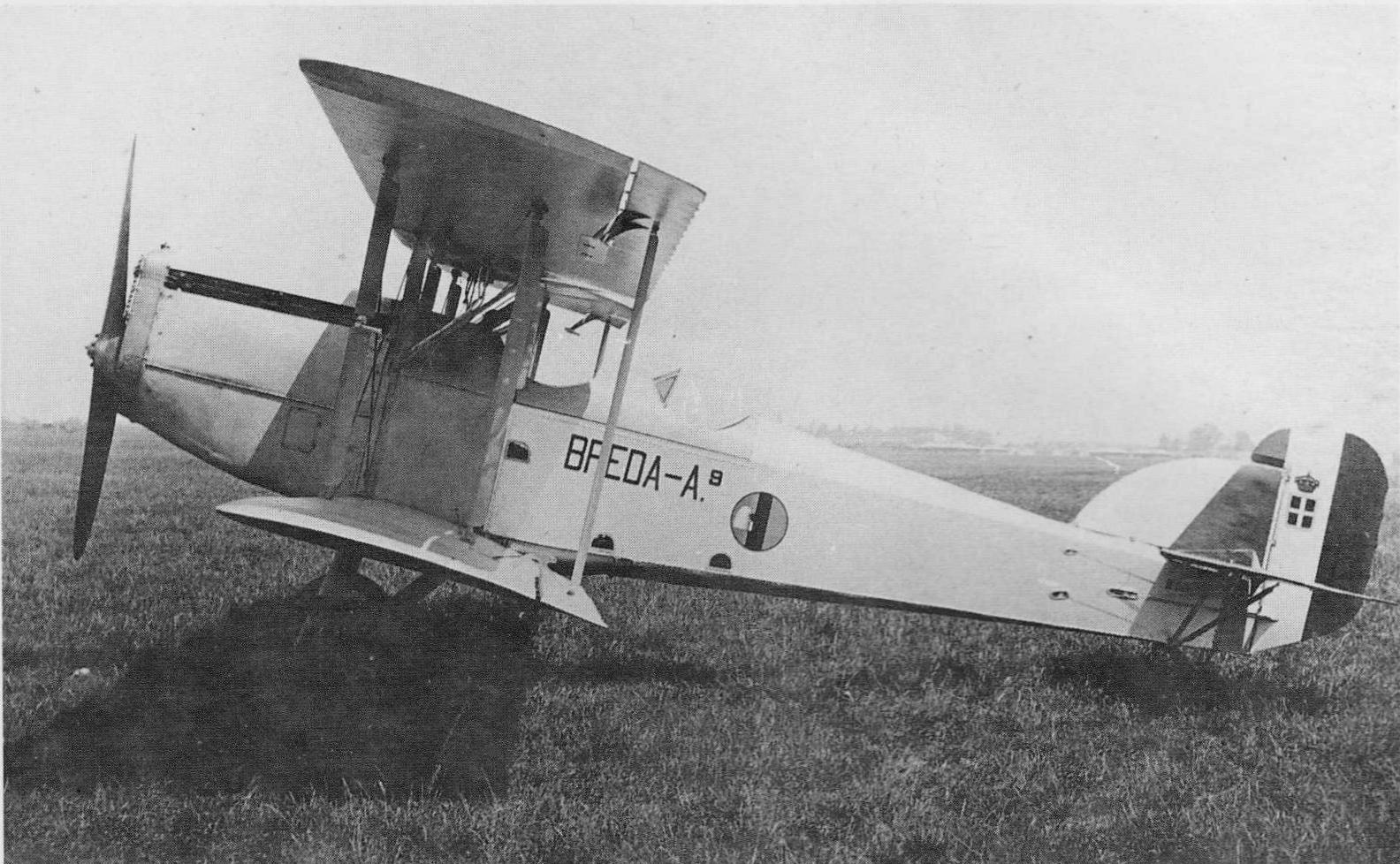
Breda A.9 1920s training aircraft

- Breda A.2
- Breda A.9
- Breda Ba.25/Mezzo-Asso
- CANT 7ter
- CANT 18 and 18bis
- CANT 22
- CANT 23
- CANT 36
- Macchi M.7
- Macchi M.18
- Piaggio P.6bis

== Specifications ==
Data from Il motorista d'aviazione 1934.

=== General characteristics ===
- Type: 6-cylinder water-cooled in-line aircraft piston engine
- Bore: 140 mm (5.5 in)
- Stroke: 160 mm (6.3 in)
- Displacement: 14.780 L (901.9 cu in)
- Dry weight: 270 kg (600 lb)

=== Components ===
- Cooling system: Water-cooled

=== Performance ===
- Power output: 250 hp (186 kW)

== See also ==
Related lists

- List of aircraft engines
