= CANT 21 =

1920s Italian aircraft

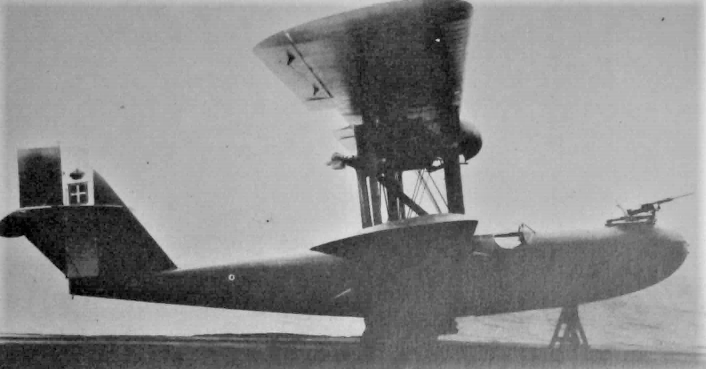

General information
- Type: Reconnaissance bomber seaplane
- National origin: Italy
- Manufacturer: CANT
- Number built: 2

History
- First flight: 1927

The CANT 21 was an Italian reconnaissance flying boat built by CANT in the late 1920s.

== Development ==
In 1926 the Regia Aeronautica contacted the CNT assigning it a contract that provided for the supply of a prototype for a two-seater, single-engine long-life hydro-ridicitor. The task was entrusted to the chief designer of the company, Raffaele Conflenti, who developed the new model, which assumed the designation CANT 21, based on the previous CANT 10 and CANT 13 maintaining the biplane central hull and from which it was essentially differentiated a different design of the hull, without a keel and with a reduced redan.

The CANT 21 was taken to the air for the first time in 1927 by the new test pilot of the company, the commander Adriano Bacula, then transferred to Vigna di Valle for comparative evaluations with the competitor Savoia-Marchetti S.62. However, the examining commission considered the S.62 much higher, declaring it the winner of the competition, but the Ministry of Aeronautics gave the CNT the necessary documentation authorizing its production for the foreign market. The company presented it to the public at the Prague Air Show of 1928, then offered to the governments of Argentina, Portugal and Turkey. Of these, only the Argentine government showed an initial interest, requiring a sample followed by a supply order for three others, subsequently reduced to one and then definitively terminated together with the first while the specimens were being built. According to other exemplary sources, however, it was delivered in 1930 and remained in service until 1940 in the Aviación Naval. production had already started and the first completed, registered I-AALN, had been provisionally assigned to the flight school headquarters of the SISA airline near Portorož followed by a second one, registered I-AAPW.

One CANT-21 was purchased by Aviación Naval Uruguaya (Uruguayan Naval Aviation) along with two CANT 18s in September 1930, with the flying boats being delivered in 1931. After the outbreak of the Second World War, spare parts became difficult to find, and the CANT 21 (together with the remaining CANT 18) was retired in July 1942.

At the end of the 1920s a new competition was announced for a further supply to the Navy's Auxiliary Aviation of a new water-repeller for the replacement of the Savoia-Marchetti S.59. The CNT managed to secure a contract for the supply of a prototype again, developed as the development of CANT 21 and which took the designation 21bis. The new model, now suitable for three crew members, adopted a different hull, returned to a more classic solution, equipped with a keel and with a considerably lengthened redan, and which housed a second station for the tail machine gun positioned behind the wingspan. For the engine we chose an Isotta Fraschini Asso 500Ri, the version equipped with a speed reducer, installed in a tractor configuration and combined with a double metal propeller. After the first flight, carried out by Bacula on 13 April 1931, he was transferred to Vigna di Valle where he again competed with the Savoia-Marchetti S.62. The S.62 was able to guarantee better performance thanks to a more powerful engine, but before the deadline, the CNT tried to remedy the problem by launching an intense development program. We returned to the solution with a drive unit in a pushing configuration, enclosing it in a gondola to reduce the overall aerodynamic drag, and adopting a quadruple helix with variable pitch, with the possibility of adjustment to the ground, coming from another model. Also the wings were subsequently modified, decaled, and adopting Handley-Page flaps on the leading edge to improve the characteristics at low speeds. The improvements were able to increase the overall performance, but despite this the choice remained on S.62. However, not even the Savoia-Marchetti obtained a supply contract because after a short time the competition was canceled for the second time.

In the 1930s the CRDA tried to relaunch the CANT 21bis model commercially, the latest evolution of the original CANT 21, already modified to better adapt it to the needs of a modern military aeronautics. The project was again developed by the engineer Conflenti and provided for a rationalization of the equipment inside the hull maintaining the appearance and motorization of the model from which it derived. The new model assumed the CANT 38 company designation, but although official photographs had been distributed that depicted it, no prototype was actually built. The photo shoot was prepared only for advertising purposes exploiting the similarity of the future model with the CANT 21bis and reproducing one of the old models to which the original writing on the drift was replaced and replaced by a "38". The CANT 38 failed to collect any commercial interest and the company of Monfalcone decided to abandon its development.

== Specifications ==
Data from

General characteristics

- Crew: 2
- Length: 10.55 m (34 ft 7 in)
- Wingspan: 16.00 m (52 ft 6 in)
- Height: 3.96 m (13 ft 0 in)
- Wing area: 58.4 m^{2} (629 sq ft)
- Empty weight: 936 kg (2,064 lb)
- Powerplant: 1 × Isotta Fraschini Asso 500 V-12 water-cooled piston engine, 380 kW (510 hp)
- Propellers: 3-bladed metal propellers

Performance

- Maximum speed: 330 km/h (205 mph, 178 kn)
- Range: 1,100 km (680 mi, 590 nmi)
- Service ceiling: 4,350 m (14,270 ft)
