= CANT 35 =

1930s Italian flying boat

General information
- Type: Reconnaissance bomber seaplane
- National origin: Italy
- Manufacturer: CANT
- Designer: Raffaele Conflenti
- Number built: 1

History
- First flight: 18 May 1932
- Developed from: CANT 21
- Variant: CANT 37

The CANT 35 was an Italian reconnaissance flying boat built by CANT in the early 1930s.

== Design and development ==
The CANT 35 was a wooden biplane seaplane with folding wings. The upper wing, moreover, was characterized by the presence of fins Handley Page. The defensive armament consisted of two 7.7 mm machine guns, in as many defensive posts (one central and one anterior). For the falling weapons, some subalar attacks were planned, as well as a photographic equipment for reconnaissance

The CANT 35 was a response to a 1930 requirement for an aircraft suitable to equip some units of the Regia Marina (i.e. the heavy cruisers class Trento and the seaplane supporting ship Giuseppe Miraglia). Engineer Raffaele Conflenti designed a biplane, wooden boat with a central hull, which was purchased on October 24, 1930, for 402,000 lire. He received the military matriculation MM.154. Temporarily transferred to Lisbon on December 21, 1931, he flew for the first time on May 18, 1932 . However, this aircraft did not develop, and the only specimen built was destroyed on June 23 six years later, following an accident.

== Specifications ==
Data from

General characteristics

- Crew: 3
- Length: 10.39 m (34 ft 1 in)
- Wingspan: 14.29 m (46 ft 11 in)
- Height: 3.84 m (12 ft 7 in)
- Wing area: 52 m^{2} (560 sq ft)
- Empty weight: 828 kg (1,825 lb)
- Max takeoff weight: 2,690 kg (5,930 lb)
- Powerplant: 1 × Isotta Fraschini Asso 500 water-cooled V-cylinder engine, 380 kW (510 hp)
- Propellers: 3-bladed metal propellers

Performance

- Maximum speed: 335 km/h (208 mph, 181 kn)
- Range: 1,500 km (930 mi, 810 nmi)
- Service ceiling: 4,100 m (13,500 ft)
