= Breda A.9 =

Biplane trainer produced in Italy in 1928

A.9
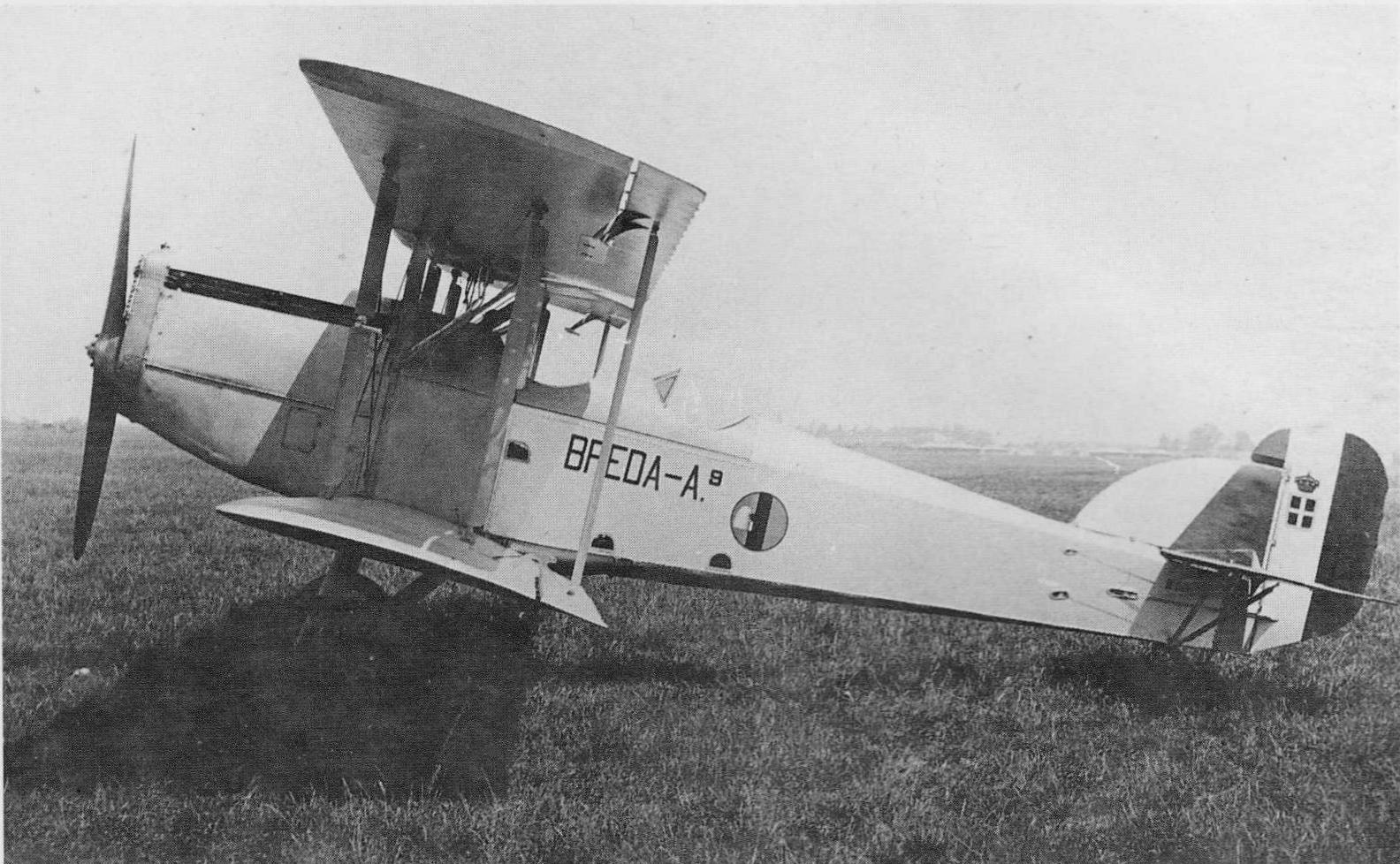

General information
- Type: Trainer
- Manufacturer: Breda
- Primary user: Regia Aeronautica

History
- First flight: 1928

The Breda A.9 was a biplane trainer produced in Italy in 1928 for the Regia Aeronautica. Conventional in design, it featured a single-bay, unstaggered wing cellule and fixed tailskid undercarriage. The student and instructor sat in tandem, open cockpits. A slightly smaller version, designated A.9-bis was developed for use in Italy's aeroclubs.

== Operators ==
Kingdom of Italy

- Regia Aeronautica

== Variants ==
A.9
Two-seat advanced training biplane.
A.9bis
A slightly smaller 8.72 m (28.6 ft) span version for aeroclubs.
A.10
Single-seat, 8.84 m (29.0 ft) span, fighter-trainer prototype, powered by a 190 kW (250 hp) Isotta Fraschini V.6; one aircraft built.

== Specifications (A.9) ==
Data from Jane's all the World's Aircraft 1928.

General characteristics

- Crew: 2
- Length: 7.95 m (26 ft 1 in)
- Wingspan: 9.32 m (30 ft 7 in)
- Height: 2.97 m (9 ft 9 in)
- Wing area: 27 m^{2} (290 sq ft)
- Empty weight: 770 kg (1,698 lb)
- Gross weight: 1,050 kg (2,315 lb)
- Powerplant: 1 × Isotta Fraschini Asso 200 6-cylinder water-cooled in-line piston engine, 190 kW (250 hp)
- Propellers: 2-bladed fixed pitch propeller

Performance

- Maximum speed: 185 km/h (115 mph, 100 kn)
- Stall speed: 75 km/h (47 mph, 40 kn)
- Range: 800 km (500 mi, 430 nmi)
- Endurance: 3 hours
- Service ceiling: 6,000 m (20,000 ft)
- Wing loading: 39 kg/m^{2} (8.0 lb/sq ft)
- Power/mass: 0.196 kW/kg (0.119 hp/lb)

== See also ==
Related lists

- List of Interwar military aircraft
