= S57 =

S57 may refer to:

- S57 (Long Island bus)
- S57 (New York City bus) serving Staten Island
- HMAS Oxley (S 57), a submarine of the Royal Australian Navy
- INS Sindhuraj (S57), a submarine of the Indian Navy
- Prince Skyline (S57), a Japanese automobile
- S57: Use appropriate containment to avoid environmental contamination, a safety phrase
- Savoia-Marchetti S.57, an Italian flying boat
- Sikorsky S-57, a planned experimental American aircraft
- Siemens S57, a Siemens mobile phone
