= Vickers Type 143 =

British single-seat fighter biplane

Type 143/Type 177
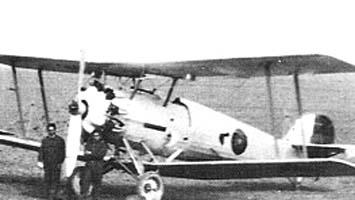
- Vickers Type 143

General information
- Type: Fighter
- Manufacturer: Vickers
- Primary user: Bolivia
- Number built: Six

History
- Introduction date: 1930
- First flight: 26 November 1929
- Developed from: Vickers Type 141

The Vickers Type 143 or Bolivian Scout was a British single-seat fighter biplane designed and built by Vickers in 1929–1930. Six were built for Bolivia in 1930, which used the survivors in the Chaco War against Paraguay.

== Design and development ==
Early in 1929, Bolivia, which was engaged in border disputes with Paraguay over the Gran Chaco region, and was trying to build up its air force, placed an order with Vickers for six fighter aircraft, the Vickers Type 143. The Type 143, or Bolivian Scout, was a development of the earlier Vickers Type 141 fighter, with the Type 141's Rolls-Royce Kestrel engine replaced by a Bristol Jupiter VIA, already powering other aircraft used by the Bolivian Air Force, and a stronger undercarriage to cope with the rough airfield surfaces in Bolivia. It was an all-metal, single-seat, biplane aircraft, with single-bay wings.

The Type 143 first flew on 11 June 1929, and successfully met all performance criteria. One of the six aircraft was evaluated by the Aeroplane and Armament Experimental Establishment (A & AEE) at Martlesham Heath before delivery to Bolivia.

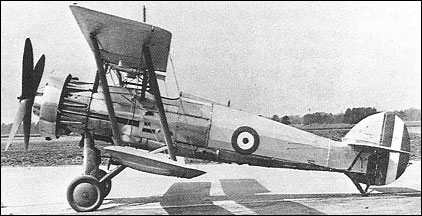
Vickers Type 177

A seventh aircraft, the Vickers Type 177 was built as a private venture to meet the requirements of Air Ministry Specification N.21/26 for a naval fighter, being fitted with a Jupiter XF engine and steerable wheel braking to aid on-deck manoeuvering. The Type 177 first flew on 26 November 1929, and while it was shown to have a maximum speed of 190 mph (310 km/h), the Hawker Nimrod, not designed against this specification, was chosen instead to meet the Fleet Air Arm's requirement for a fighter.

== Operational history ==
Delivery of the six Type 143s to Bolivia began in January 1930. While the type proved popular in Bolivian service, three of the six had been written off by the time the border disputes between Bolivia and Paraguay escalated into the Chaco War. The three remaining Type 143s continued to serve in the Chaco War until superseded by Curtiss Hawks, damaging at least one Paraguayan Wibault 73 in air-to-air combat.

== Variants ==
Vickers Type 143
Six aircraft for Bolivia, powered by 450 hp (340 kW) Bristol Jupiter VIA engine.
Vickers Type 177
One prototype Naval Fighter, evaluated for Fleet Air Arm, powered by 540 hp (400 kW) Bristol Jupiter XFS engine. No production.

== Operators ==
Bolivia

- Bolivian Air Force received six aircraft.

United Kingdom

- Fleet Air Arm tested one prototype.

== Specifications (Type 143) ==
Data from The Complete Book of Fighters

General characteristics

- Length: 27 ft 10 1/2 in (8.496 m)
- Wingspan: 34 ft 0 in (10.36 m)
- Height: 11 ft 3 in (3.43 m)
- Wing area: 336 sq ft (31.2 m^{2})
- Empty weight: 2,246 lb (1,019 kg)
- Gross weight: 3,120 lb (1,415 kg)
- Powerplant: 1 × Bristol Jupiter VIA 9-cylinder air-cooled radial engine, 450 hp (340 kW)

Performance

- Maximum speed: 150 mph (240 km/h, 130 kn) at 11,500 ft (3,500 m)
- Service ceiling: 20,000 ft (6,100 m)
- Time to altitude: 10 min to 13,100 ft (4,000 m)

Armament

- Guns: Two Vickers machine guns

== See also ==
- Aerial operations in the Chaco War

Related development

- Vickers Type 141
