= CANT 36 =

General information
- Type: Military trainer aircraft
- Manufacturer: CANT
- Designer: Raffaele Conflenti
- Number built: 1

History
- First flight: 1932

The CANT 36 was a trainer developed in Italy in the 1930s. It was a conventional design with fixed tailskid undercarriage and accommodation for the pilot and instructor in tandem, open cockpits. Intended for advanced training, it was equipped with a powerful 187 kW (250 hp) engine. The single prototype was evaluated by the Regia Aeronautica, but when no purchase order was forthcoming, no further examples were built.

== Specifications ==
General characteristics

- Crew: 2, pilot and instructor
- Length: 8.50 m (27 ft 11 in)
- Wingspan: 10.50 m (34 ft 5 in)
- Empty weight: 950 kg (2,094 lb)
- Powerplant: 1 × Isotta Fraschini Asso 200 , 187 kW (250 hp)

Performance

- Maximum speed: 210 km/h (130 mph, 110 kn)
- Service ceiling: 5,600 m (18,400 ft)

Armament

- 2 × 7.7 mm (.303 in) machine guns
