= CANT 13 =

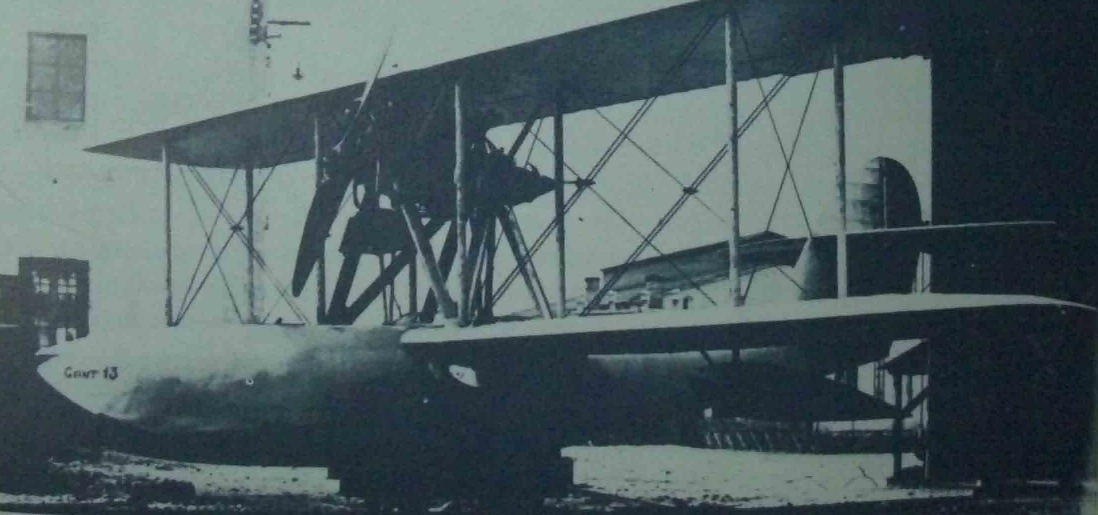

General information
- Type: Shipboard amphibious aircraft
- Manufacturer: CANT
- Designer: Raffaele Conflenti
- Number built: 2

History
- First flight: 1925

The CANT 13 was an amphibious aircraft designed for use on Regia Marina ships in response to a 1925 competition.

== Design ==
The CANT 13 was a conventional amphibious aircraft, a two-seater single-engined biplane amphibian with retractable undercarriage, made entirely of wood. The hull had an open two-seat side-by-side cockpit with an internal passage that allowed the second member of the crew to reach the two defensive positions, front and rear, both equipped with a machine gun. The equal span foldable wings were connected by a pair of inter-plane struts on each side, braced by tie rods in steel cable, with the upper wing equipped with ailerons. The landing gear was manually retractable operated by the pilot. Propulsion was supplied by a Lorraine-Dietrich 12Db liquid-cooled V-12 delivering 400 hp (300 kW), driving with a fixed-pitch 2-bladed propeller placed between the two wings above the hull on a tubular steel central supporting .

== Development ==
In 1925 the Ministry of Aeronautics issued a specification for the supply of a new amphibious aircraft to equip naval units of the Regia Marina. The CNT took part in the competition with a project entrusted to the engineer Raffaele Conflenti.

Two aircraft were built and were evaluated by the Regia Aeronautica but due to changes in the plans of the General Staff, no mass production was decided, but they were employed by the Regia Marina for at least the following two years.

== Specifications ==
Data from C.N.T. CANT.13

General characteristics

- Crew: 2
- Length: 10 m (32 ft 10 in)
- Wingspan: 14.68 m (48 ft 2 in)
- Powerplant: 1 × Lorraine-Dietrich 12Db V-12 water-cooled piston engine, 300 kW (400 hp)
- Propellers: 2-bladed fixed pitch propeller

Performance

- Maximum speed: 190 km/h (120 mph, 100 kn)
- Range: 1,150 km (710 mi, 620 nmi)
- Service ceiling: 4,600 m (15,100 ft)

Armament

- Guns: 2 × 7.7 mm (0.303 in) Lewis guns
- Bombs: 100 kg (220 lb) of bombs

== See also ==
Related lists

- List of flying boats and floatplanes
