= Caproni Ca.61 =

General information
- Type: Bomber aircraft
- National origin: Italy
- Manufacturer: Caproni
- Number built: 1 or 2

History
- First flight: c.1922-3
- Developed from: Caproni Ca.36

The Caproni Ca.61 was an Italian heavy day bomber aircraft of 1922. It was the final development of the Caproni three engine, twin boom biplane types developed during World War I, but it was not put into production.

== Development ==
The Caproni Ca.61 and Ca.61a were the final evolution of the Caproni Ca.1 bomber of 1914. The Ca.61 retained the twin boom biplane layout, the three engines in push-pull configuration and the approximate dimensions of the 1916 Ca.36, the main Ca.3 type production variant, but had more modern, streamlined structures and balanced rudders.

In May 1923 a contemporary report described it as the "Caproni type 1922-3", suggesting the design work and construction started in 1922. The completion date is unclear, not least because even as the original design, the Ca.61, was under construction the benefit of some modifications was recognised. It is uncertain if the Ca.61 was completed or if the airframe was modified into the Ca.61a before the first flight. The main differences between the Ca.61a and the Ca.61 included a smaller interplane gap, the addition of dihedral to the outer wings, aerodynamic alterations to the ailerons and structural simplifications to the inner wing bracing. There were also modifications to the fuselage to improve the gunner's position in the nose.

== Design ==
The wings of the Ca.61 were rectangular in plan and had, ailerons apart, the same span and similar chords, though the lower wing was 9% narrower. Both wings were built around pairs of spars. The wings were divided into three sections, a central cell defined by the two booms and two outer sections which could be easily demounted, like those of the Ca.36. In both the inner and outer sections, the wings were braced together by parallel pairs of interplane struts between the spars, with two nearly vertical pairs on each side on the outer wings. In addition, pairs of diagonal struts ran from the feet of the inner vertical struts to the junction of the inner and outer sections over the booms, meeting another pair from the upper fuselage. Two more pairs of struts from this point to the wing centre formed a cabane. Only the outer wing sections carried dihedral. There were ailerons on both upper and lower wings but only the upper pair were aerodynamically balanced by extensions beyond the wingtips.

The two deep, oval section tailbooms, with the outer engines at their forward ends on the lower wing, were joined to the upper wing via the oblique interplane struts. The booms ran aft to carry the empennage. The Ca.61's biplane horizontal tail, with constant chord tailplanes and elevators mounted between the fins, formed a stiffening structural box-unit. The balanced rudders were broad and tall.

The three-man crew of the Ca.61a were in open cockpits well forward of the wing in a central, short fuselage. There was a compartment for a defensive gunner, equipped with a flexible gun mount, in the nose and behind him a separate cockpit with side-by-side seating for pilot and co-pilot, fitted with dual control. Bombs were carried on the fuselage underside and the third engine was mounted in pusher configuration at its rear.

Two different engines were proposed for the Ca.61a, 130 kW (180 hp) Isotta Fraschini V.6s or 160 kW (220 hp) SPA 6As, both six-cylinder upright water-cooled inline engines. From the powers quoted for the Ca.61 and the Ca.61a earlier design had Isotta Fraschinis and the later one SPAs.

The Ca.61a had a conventional, fixed undercarriage with double-tyred mainwheels under the outer engines. Each wheel was hinged on a V-strut from the fuselage side and a narrow V drag strut from the aft spar to the stub axle ends. A vertical, shock-absorbing strut joined the axle to the forward spar. There were tailskids at the ends of the booms and a large nosewheel, half-buried in the fuselage below the gunner, in case of nose-overs.

The Ca.61 satisfied Caproni's testing programme but the government placed no production orders.

== Variants ==
Ca.61
Prototype, completion uncertain, Issota Fraschini engines.
Ca.61a
Reduced interplane gap, outer wing dihedral, balanced ailerons on upper wing only, SPA engines.
Ca.62
Proposed flying boat version; not built
Ca.63
Improved Ca.61a, utilized lightweight construction materials and three 260 hp engines; not built
Ca.63a
Twin-engine version of Ca.63 with two 360 hp engines; not built

== Specifications (Ca.61a) ==
Data from Les Ailes May 1923

General characteristics

- Crew: Three
- Length: 10.88 m (35 ft 8 in)
- Upper wingspan: 20.72 m (68 ft 0 in) including overhung ailerons
- Lower wingspan: 19 m (62 ft 4 in)
- Height: 4.20 m (13 ft 9 in)
- Wing area: 100 m^{2} (1,100 sq ft)
- Empty weight: 2,700 kg (5,952 lb)
- Gross weight: 4,000 kg (8,818 lb)
- Powerplant: 3 × SPA 6A 6-cylinder water-cooled inline, 160 kW (220 hp) each ; tractor outer pair, pusher central
- Propellers: 2-bladed, 2.60 m (8 ft 6 in) diameter

Performance

- Maximum speed: 160–170 km/h (99–106 mph, 86–92 kn)
- Endurance: 4 hr

Armament

- Guns: A flexible machine-gun mount was provided for the nose gunner
