= SIAI S.22 =

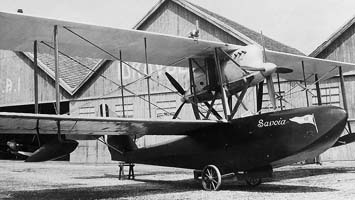

General information
- Type: Racing flying boat
- National origin: Italy
- Manufacturer: SIAI
- Primary user: Italy
- Number built: 1

History
- First flight: 1921

The SIAI S.22 was an Italian racing flying boat, built by SIAI for the 1921 Schneider Trophy race.

== Design and development ==
The S.22 was a single-seat twin-engine biplane flying boat. Its two 224 kW (300 hp) Isotta Fraschini V.6bis engines were mounted on eight struts above the hull and below the upper wing, driving two propellers, one in tractor configuration and one in pusher configuration.

== Operational history ==
During test flights over Lake Maggiore prior to the 1921 Schneider Trophy races, the S.22 crashed into the lake, ending the hope that it would represent Italy in the race.

== Operators ==
Kingdom of Italy

== Specifications ==
Data from Aviation: SIAI racing seaplanes

General characteristics

- Crew: one
- Length: 7.62 m (25 ft 0 in)
- Wingspan: 13.5 m (44 ft 3.5 in)
- Gross weight: 2,500 kg (5,512 lb)
- Powerplant: 2 × Isotta Fraschini V.6bis six-cylinder, water-cooled, in-line piston aero engine , 224 kW (300 hp) each

Performance

== See also ==
- Schneider Trophy

Related lists

- List of seaplanes and flying boats
