= CANT 6 =

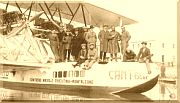

General information
- Type: Maritime patrol flying boat
- Manufacturer: CANT
- Designer: Raffaele Conflenti
- Number built: 3

History
- First flight: 1925

The CANT 6 was a flying boat designed for Italian military service in 1925. It was a large biplane of conventional design with three engines mounted in nacelles within the interplane gap. Only a single example was produced in its original military configuration, followed by two further aircraft redesigned as 11-seat passenger aircraft. One of these was retained by CANT, but the other entered airline service with Società Italiana Servizi Aerei.

== Variants ==
- CANT 6 : Three-engine bomber aircraft. One built.
- CANT 6ter : 11-seat passenger transport aircraft. Two built.

== Operators ==
Kingdom of Italy

- Società Italiana Servizi Aerei (S.I.S.A.)

== Specifications (6ter) ==
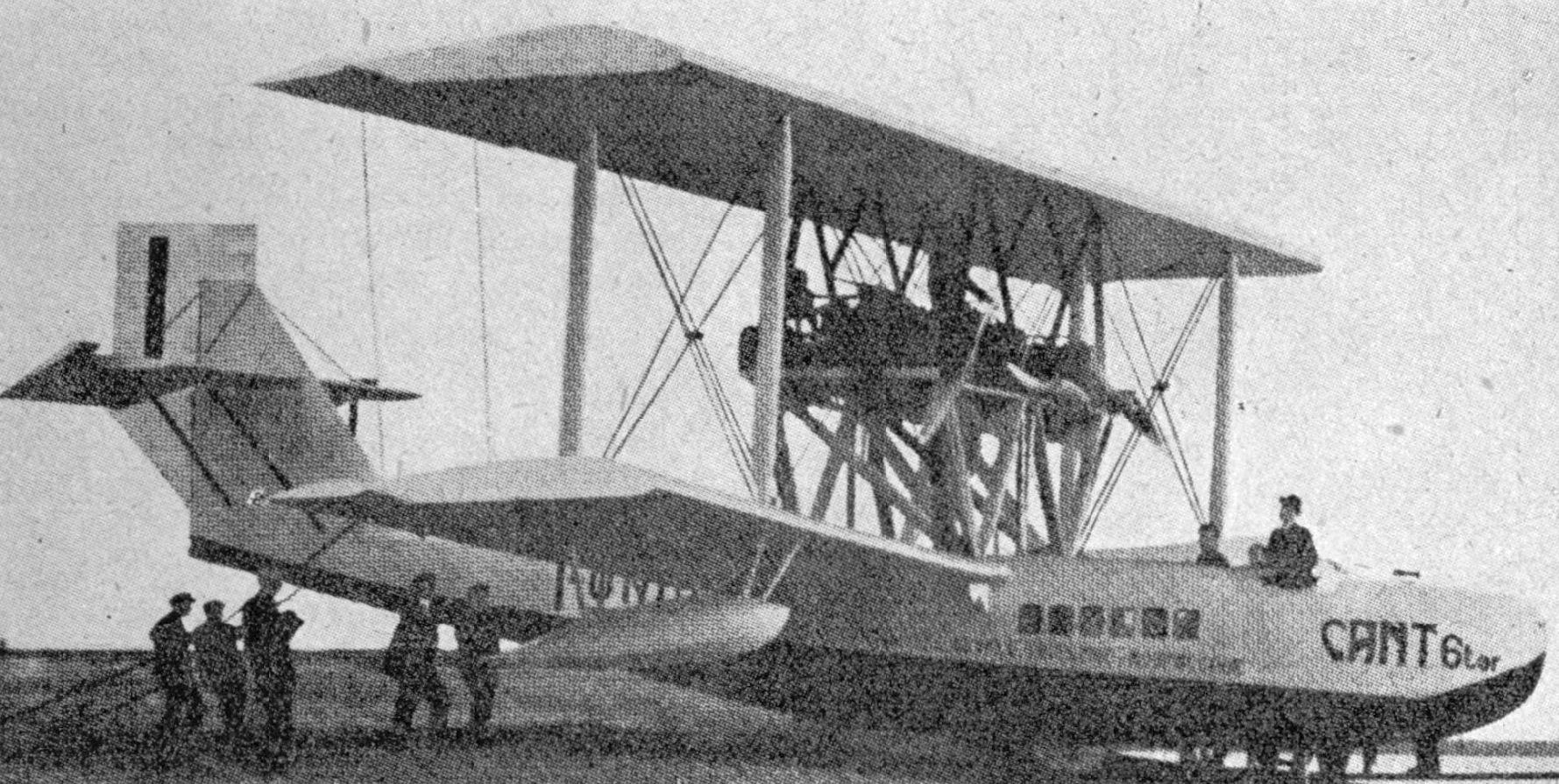
CANT 6ter photo from Le Document aéronautique June,1928

General characteristics

- Crew: Three
- Capacity: 11 passengers
- Length: 14.94 m (49 ft 0 in)
- Wingspan: 22.11 m (72 ft 6 in)
- Empty weight: 4,500 kg (9,920 lb)
- Powerplant: 3 × Lorraine-Dietrich 12Db , 298 kW (400 hp) each

Performance

- Maximum speed: 190 km/h (120 mph, 100 kn)
- Range: 1,150 km (720 mi, 630 nmi)
- Service ceiling: 4,000 m (13,120 ft)

== See also ==
Related lists

- List of flying boats and floatplanes
