= CANT 37 =

1930s Italian flying boat

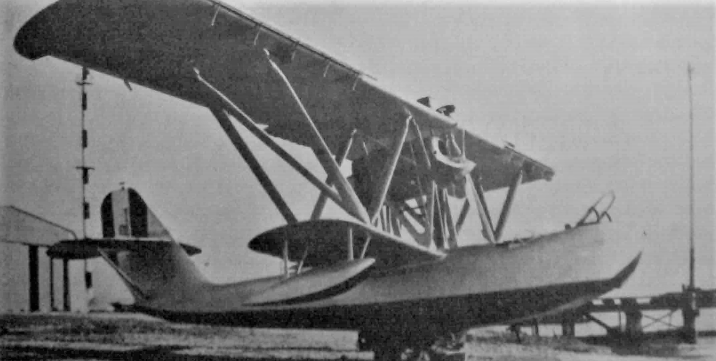

General information
- Type: Reconnaissance bomber seaplane
- National origin: Italy
- Manufacturer: CANT
- Designer: Raffaele Conflenti
- Number built: 1

History
- First flight: 2 May 1932
- Developed from: CANT 35

The CANT 37 was an Italian reconnaissance flying boat built by CANT in the early 1930s.

== Design and development ==
The CANT 37 was a classic center-shaped seaplane; biplane, single-seater, and single-engine in pushing configuration. The hull was characterized by a keel with a redan and had three open cabins, one positioned on the bow with a defensive post, a central one that served as an open cockpit protected by a windshield followed by a third one also with a defensive function. Posteriormente ended in a single-sided cruciform caulking with horizontal braced planes. The wing configuration was biplane-sesquiplane, with the upper wing from the opening, mounted high to parasol, significantly larger than the lower one, the latter characterized by a sensitive angle of positive dihedral, and which integrated the floats into the lower part of the wings. Balancers and the two attacks for light bombs. The two wings were connected by a double pair of "N" uprights on each side, in the "Warren" configuration, and the upper part was supplemented by diagonal uprights connecting it to the upper part of the hull.

== Specifications ==
Data from

General characteristics

- Crew: 3
- Length: 33 ft 11 in (10.34 m)
- Wingspan: 54 ft 6 in (16.60 m)
- Empty weight: 1,820 lb (826 kg)
- Powerplant: 1 × Isotta Fraschini Asso 500 V-12 water-cooled piston engine, 400 hp (300 kW)
- Propellers: 3-bladed metal propeller

Performance

- Maximum speed: 200 mph (320 km/h, 170 kn)
- Range: 1,400 mi (2,200 km, 1,200 nmi)
- Service ceiling: 18,000 ft (5,500 m)
