= Savoia-Marchetti S.57 =

Italian single-engine biplane flying boat

S.57
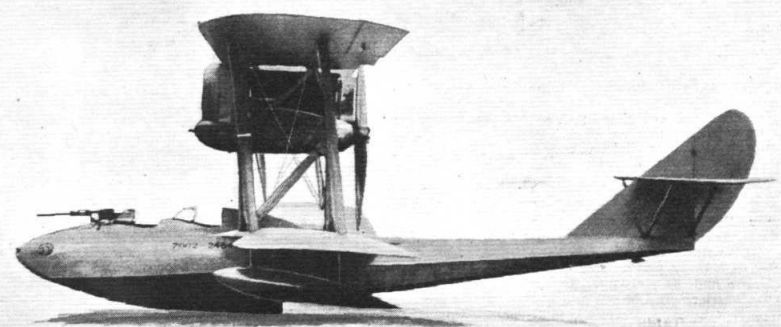

General information
- Type: Biplane reconnaissance flying boat
- Manufacturer: Savoia-Marchetti
- Primary user: Regia Aeronautica
- Number built: 20

History
- First flight: 1923

The Savoia-Marchetti S.57 was an Italian single-engine biplane flying boat intended for aerial reconnaissance, built by Savoia-Marchetti for Regia Aeronautica after World War I.

== Design and development ==
Of wooden construction with a single-step hull, with pilot and observer/gunner in tandem open cockpits in the bow, the S.57 was powered by a single 186 kW (249 hp) Isotta-Fraschini V.6. The observer had a single ring-mounted 7.7 mm (0.303 in) machine gun.

Eighteen S.57s were accepted by Regia Aeronautica in 1925 and used as trainers.

A sole S.57bis (improved) was built, with a 224 kW (300 hp) Hispano-Suiza Type 42 engine.

== Operators ==
Kingdom of Italy

- Regia Aeronautica

== Specifications ==
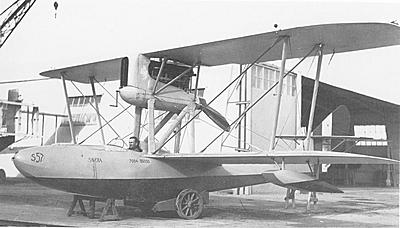

Data from The complete encyclopedia of world aircraft

General characteristics

- Crew: 2
- Wingspan: 11.25 m (36 ft 11 in)
- Gross weight: 1,605 kg (3,538 lb)
- Powerplant: 1 × Isotta Fraschini V.6 6-cylinder water-cooled, in-line piston engine, 186 kW (249 hp)

Performance

- Maximum speed: 215 km/h (134 mph, 116 kn)

Armament

- Guns: 1 × 7.7 mm (0.303 in) machine gun mounted on a Scarff ring for the observer

== See also ==
Related lists

- List of Interwar military aircraft
- List of flying boats and floatplanes
