= CANT 26 =

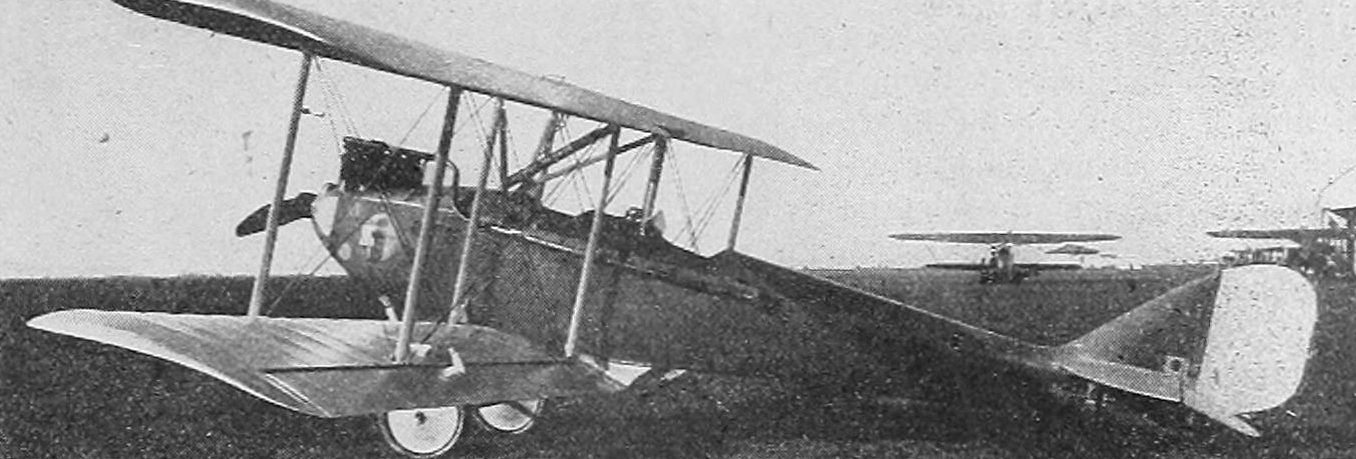

General information
- Type: Biplane trainer
- Manufacturer: CANT
- Number built: 7

History
- First flight: 1928

The CANT 26 was an Italian two-seat biplane trainer built by CANT.

== Design and development ==
The CANT 26 was an unusual product of CANT as it was a landplane. It was a two-seat biplane with tailwheel landing gear and powered by a 60 kW (80 hp) engine. Only seven examples were built, one of which competed in the Challenge 1929 trials, and another of which was temporarily converted into a seaplane. One plane was registered in Argentina as R-183 and it was later sold to an Italian citizen resident in Paraguay, Nicola Bo in 1932. He sold it to the Paraguayan Military Air Arm. It received the serial T-6 and it was used as a liaison aircraft during the Chaco War. It was destroyed in a fatal accident during the war on May 5, 1933, killing Capt. José D. Jara (pilot) and Lt. Niemann (passenger).

== Operators ==
Paraguay

- Paraguayan Air Force

== Specifications ==
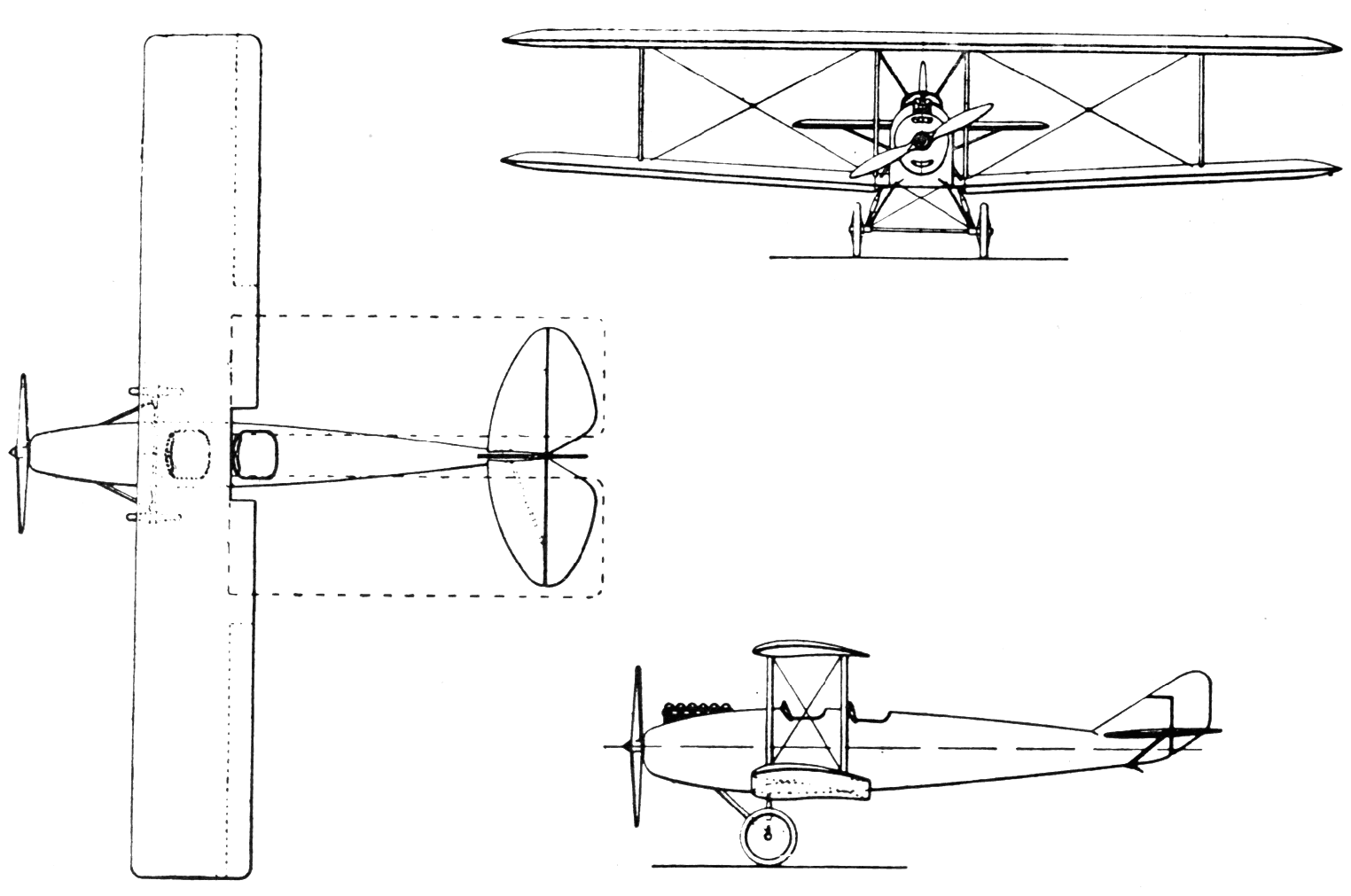
CANT 26 3-View drawing from L'Air January 15, 1929

Data from Jane's all the World's Aircraft 1928

General characteristics

- Crew: 2
- Length: 7 m (23 ft 0 in)
- Wingspan: 10 m (32 ft 10 in)
- Height: 2.67 m (8 ft 9 in)
- Wing area: 26.2 m^{2} (282 sq ft)
- Empty weight: 370 kg (816 lb)
- Gross weight: 650 kg (1,433 lb)
- Powerplant: 1 × Isotta Fraschini Asso 80 6-cyl air-cooled in-line piston engine, 60 kW (80 hp)
- Propellers: 2-bladed fixed pitch propeller

Performance

- Maximum speed: 150 km/h (93 mph, 81 kn)
- Stall speed: 62 km/h (39 mph, 33 kn)
- Range: 810 km (500 mi, 440 nmi)
- Service ceiling: 3,800 m (12,500 ft)
- Wing loading: 25 kg/m^{2} (5.1 lb/sq ft)
- Power/mass: 0.238 kW/kg (0.145 hp/lb)
