= CANT 22 =

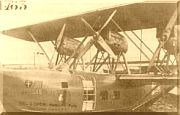

General information
- Type: Flying boat airliner
- Manufacturer: CANT
- Designer: Raffaele Conflenti
- Primary user: SISA
- Number built: 10

History
- First flight: 1927

The CANT 22 was a flying boat airliner built in Italy in the 1920s and operated by Società Italiana Servizi Aerei (SISA) on their Adriatic routes. It was a conventional biplane design with unstaggered wings braced by Warren trusses. The three engines were mounted in nacelles carried in the interplane gap. Accommodation for passengers was provided within the hull, but the pilots sat in an open cockpit. Originally designed to carry eight passengers, an engine upgrade on later examples allowed the addition of two more seats.

== Variants ==
- Cant 22 : Eight-passenger flying-boat airliner, powered by three 149 kW (200 hp) Isotta Fraschini piston engines.
- Cant 22R.1 : 10-passenger flying-boat airliner, powered by two 186 kW (250 hp) and one 380 kW (510 hp) Isotta-Fraschini piston engines.

== Operators ==
Kingdom of Italy

- Società Italiana Servizi Aerei

== Specifications (22R1) ==
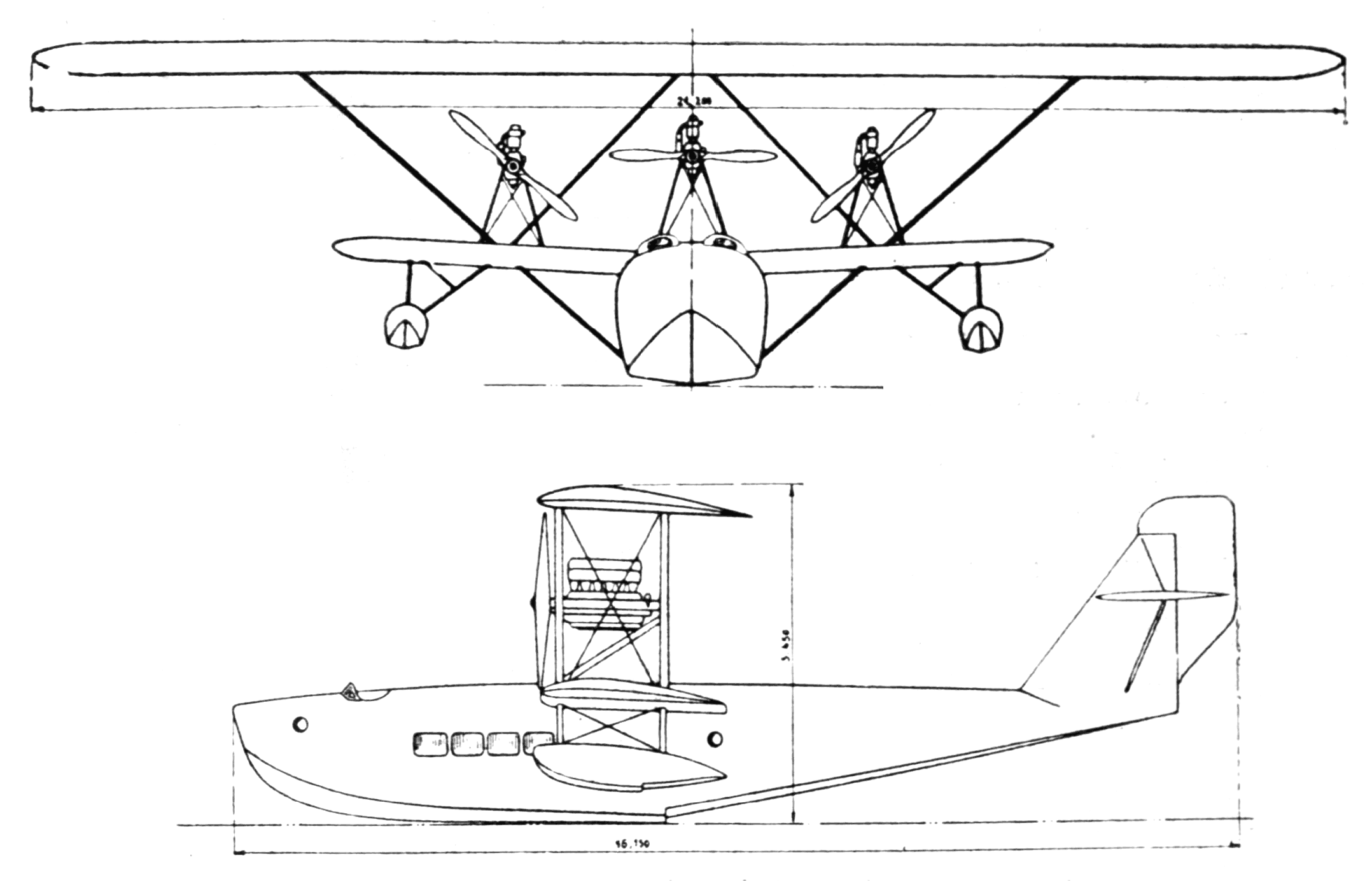
CANT 22 2-view drawing from L'Air January 1,1928

General characteristics

- Crew: Three
- Capacity: 10 passengers
- Length: 21.00 m (68 ft 11 in)
- Wingspan: 16.00 m (52 ft 6 in)
- Empty weight: 5,000 kg (11,020 lb)
- Powerplant: 1 × Isotta Fraschini Asso 500 , 380 kW (510 hp)
- Powerplant: 2 × Isotta Fraschini Asso 200 , 187 kW (250 hp) each

Performance

- Maximum speed: 201 km/h (125 mph, 109 kn)
- Range: 600 km (374 mi, 325 nmi)
- Service ceiling: 3,400 m (11,150 ft)

== See also ==
Related lists

- List of flying boats and floatplanes
