= Vickers Type 123 =

Type 123
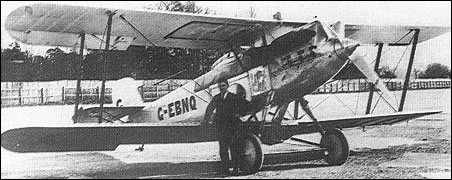
- Vickers 123

General information
- Type: Single-seat fighter
- National origin: United Kingdom
- Manufacturer: Vickers Limited
- Status: Scrapped
- Number built: 1

History
- First flight: 11 September 1926
- Retired: 1930

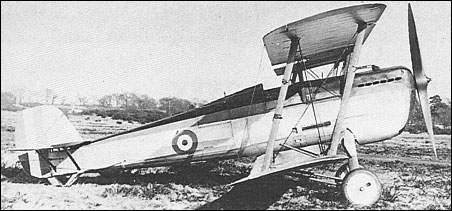
Vickers 141

The Vickers Type 123 was a 1920s British single-seat biplane fighter designed and built by Vickers Limited as a private venture. The only Type 123 was later modified into the Type 141 but, not winning any orders, it was scrapped in 1930.

== Design and development ==
The Type 123 was a conventional biplane powered by a 400 hp (298 kW) Hispano-Suiza T52 (Hispano 12 Jb) engine, built at Weybridge Aerodrome in 1926. It was registered as G-EBNQ in February 1926 and first flew on 11 September 1926. In 1927 it had a 480 hp (358 kW) Rolls-Royce F.XI engine fitted and was redesignated Type 141. It competed unsuccessfully in an Air Ministry fighter procurement competition in January 1928. It was then modified as a fleet fighter to meet Specification 21/26 and carried out trials on HMS Furious in June 1929. Without winning any orders the aircraft was scrapped in 1930.

== Specifications (Type 123) ==
Data from

General characteristics

- Crew: 1
- Length: 29 ft 6 in (8.99 m)
- Wingspan: 34 ft 0 in (10.36 m)
- Height: 9 ft 4 in (2.84 m)
- Wing area: 336 sq ft (31.2 m^{2})
- Empty weight: 2,278 lb (1,033 kg)
- Gross weight: 3,300 lb (1,497 kg)
- Powerplant: 1 × Hispano-Suiza T52 liquid-cooled V12 engine, 400 hp (300 kW)

Performance

- Maximum speed: 149 mph (240 km/h, 129 kn) at 10,000 ft (3,000 m)
- Time to altitude: 6.6 min to 10,000 ft (3,000 m)

Armament

- Guns: 2× Vickers machine guns in fuselage-side blisters
