= CANT 10 =

Italian flying boat airliner

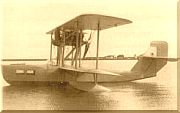

General information
- Type: Flying boat airliner
- Manufacturer: CANT
- Designer: Raffaele Conflenti
- Primary user: SISA; TAXI AEREI; PARAGUAYAN NAVAL AVIATION
- Number built: 18

History
- First flight: 1925

The CANT 10 was a flying boat airliner produced in Italy in the 1920s. It was a conventional biplane design with single-bay, unstaggered wings of equal span, having seating for four passengers within the hull, while the pilot sat in an open cockpit. The engine was mounted in pusher configuration in the interplane gap.

== Operational history ==
CANT 10 flying boats were used by Società Italiana Servizi Aerei for over a decade, linking destinations in the Adriatic Sea.
Two CANT 10ters were used by a company called TAXI AEREI in Buenos Aires, operating flights from the River Plate. One of them was lost in an accident and the other one was bought by the Paraguayan government for the Naval Aviation in 1929; it was used as a transport during the Chaco War and was withdrawn from use in 1933.

== Variants ==
- CANT 10 :
- CANT 10ter :

== Operators ==
- Kingdom of Italy
  - Società Italiana Servizi Aerei (S.I.S.A.)
- ARG
  - TAXI AEREI
- PAR
  - Paraguayan Naval Aviation

== Specifications ==
General characteristics

- Crew: one, pilot
- Capacity: four passengers
- Length: 10.10 m (33 ft 2 in)
- Wingspan: 13.10 m (43 ft 0 in)
- Empty weight: 1,550 kg (3,420 lb)
- Gross weight: 2,350 kg (5,180 lb)
- Powerplant: 1 × Fiat A.12bis , 224 kW (300 hp)

Performance

- Maximum speed: 160 km/h (100 mph, 87 kn)
- Range: 595 km (370 mi, 320 nmi)
- Service ceiling: 4,200 m (13,780 ft)

== See also ==
Related lists

- List of seaplanes and flying boats
