= Isotta Fraschini V.6 =

1910s Italian aircraft piston engine

V.6
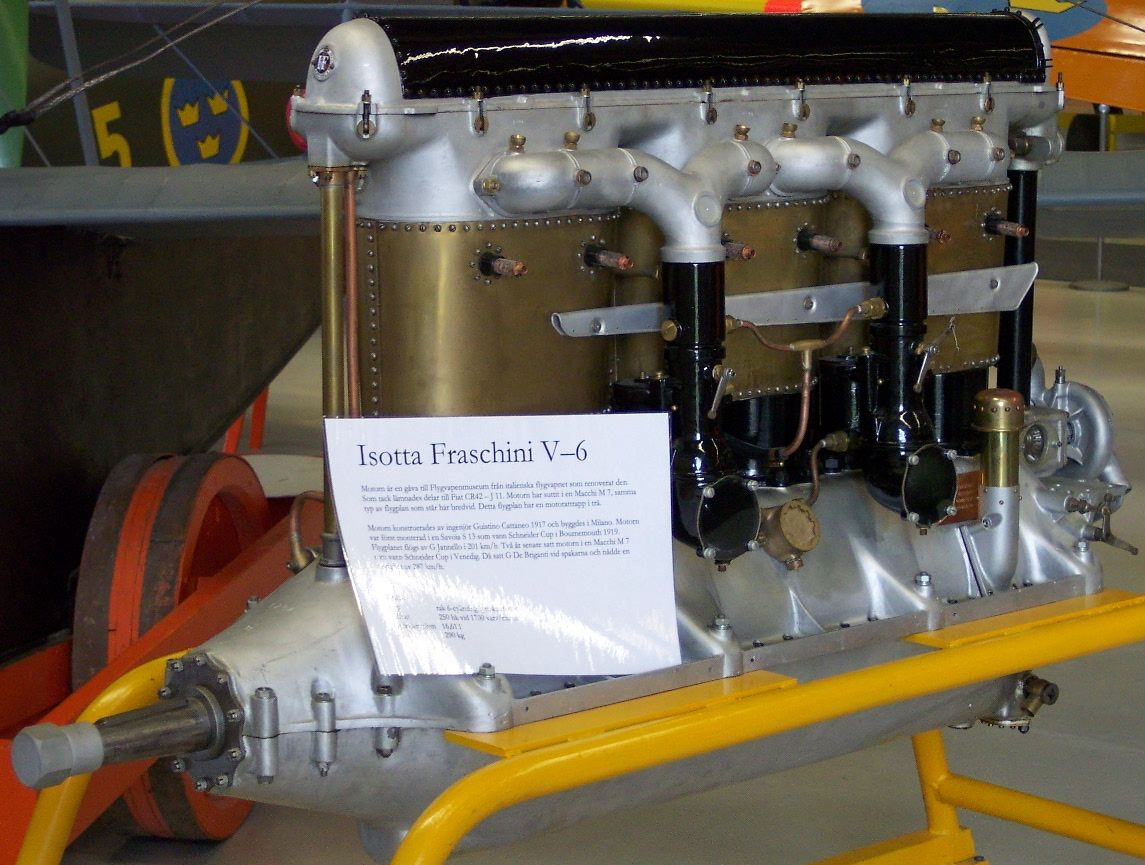
- Type: Piston aero engine
- Manufacturer: Isotta Fraschini
- First run: 1917

The Isotta Fraschini V.6 was an Italian six-cylinder, water-cooled, in-line piston aero engine of the late World War I period, the "V" denoted "Volo" or "flight". Its construction was fairly typical of contemporary aircraft engines, using six cast-iron cylinders mounted in pairs with common heads.

== Variants ==
V.6
V.6bis

== Applications ==
- CANT 18
- Caproni Ca.4
- Caproni Ca.5
- Caproni Ca.61
- Macchi M.5
- Macchi M.7
- Piaggio P.6
- Savoia-Marchetti S.57
- SIAI S.13
- SIAI S.22

== Specifications (V.6) ==
Data from Gunston.

=== General characteristics ===
- Type: Six-cylinder, water-cooled, in-line piston engine
- Bore: 140 mm (5.5 in)
- Stroke: 180 mm (7.1 in)
- Displacement: 16.6 L (1,013 cu in)
- Dry weight: 281 kg (619 lb)

=== Components ===
- Fuel system: Carburettor
- Cooling system: Water-cooled

=== Performance ===
- Power output: 186 kW (250 hp) at 1,650 rpm

== See also ==
Comparable engines

- Siddeley Puma

Related lists

- List of aircraft engines
