= CANT 18 =

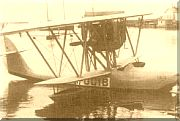

General information
- Type: Flying boat trainer
- Manufacturer: CANT
- Designer: Raffaele Conflenti
- Primary user: SISA
- Number built: 29

History
- First flight: 1926

The CANT 18 was a flying boat trainer developed in Italy in the 1920s to prepare pilots for flying boat airliners. A development of the CANT 7, it incorporated various aerodynamic and hydrodynamic refinements. While remaining broadly similar in configuration, the new design replaced the CANT 7's conventional struts with Warren truss bracing for the wings. Most of the aircraft produced were used by S.I.S.A.

== Operators ==
Kingdom of Italy

- Società Italiana Servizi Aerei (S.I.S.A.)

Uruguay

- Uruguayan Navy

== Specifications ==
General characteristics

- Crew: 2, pilot and instructor
- Length: 8.68 m (28 ft 6 in)
- Wingspan: 10.50 m (34 ft 5 in)
- Empty weight: 975 kg (2,150 lb)
- Powerplant: 1 × Isotta Fraschini V.6 Six-cylinder, water-cooled, in-line piston engine , 187 kW (250 hp)

Performance

- Maximum speed: 190 km/h (120 mph, 100 kn)
- Range: 600 km (374 mi, 325 nmi)
- Service ceiling: 5,500 m (18,040 ft)

== See also ==
Related lists

- List of seaplanes and flying boats
