= CANT 7 =

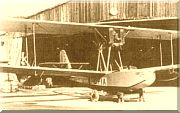

General information
- Type: Flying boat trainer
- Manufacturer: CANT
- Designer: Raffaele Conflenti
- Primary user: Società Italiana Servizi Aerei
- Number built: 34

History
- First flight: 1924

The CANT 7 was a flying boat and training aircraft that was produced in Italy in the 1920s. It was a conventional biplane design with single-bay, unstaggered wings of equal span, with the single engine mounted below the upper wing. The aircraft was designed to prepare pilots for flying boat airliners, and most of the examples produced were purchased by Società Italiana Servizi Aerei for this purpose.

== Operators ==
Kingdom of Italy

- Società Italiana Servizi Aerei (S.I.S.A.)

== Specifications ==
General characteristics

- Crew: 2, pilot and instructor
- Length: 9.15 m (30 ft 0 in)
- Wingspan: 11.80 m (38 ft 8 in)
- Empty weight: 935 kg (2,061 lb)
- Gross weight: 1,350 kg (2,976 lb)
- Powerplant: 1 × Isotta Fraschini V.4BB , 112 kW (150 hp)

Performance

- Maximum speed: 165 km/h (103 mph, 90 kn)
- Endurance: 4 hours

== See also ==
Related lists

- List of flying boats and floatplanes
