= Cantieri Aeronautici e Navali Triestini =

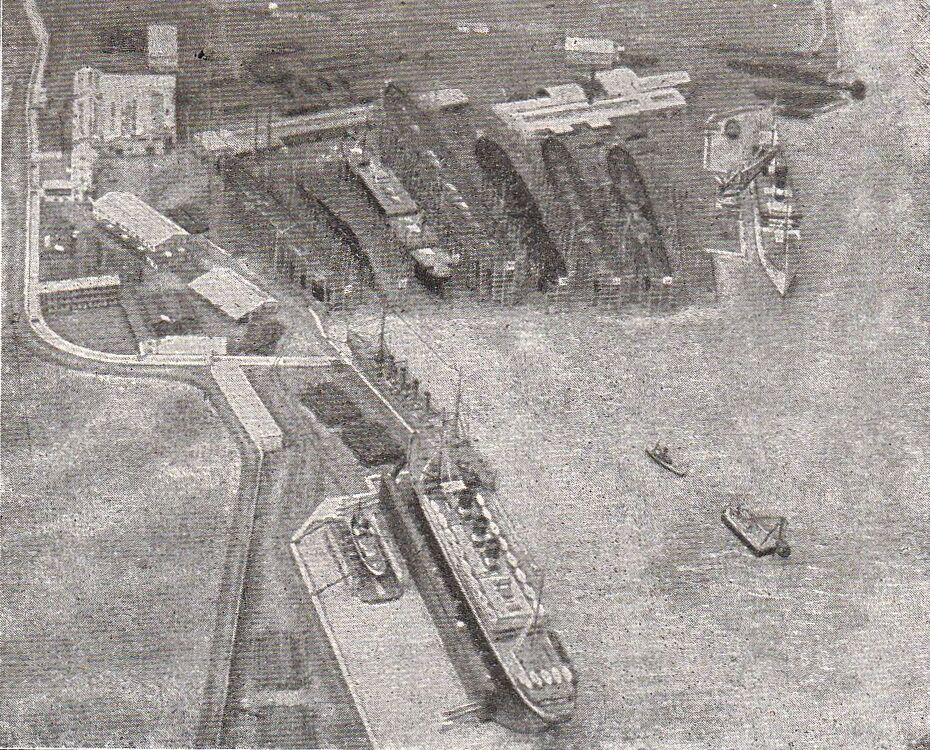

CANT (Cantieri Aeronautici e Navali Triestini, the Trieste Shipbuilding and Naval Aeronautics; also sometimes labelled C.R.D.A. CANT) was an Italian aviation company which originally specialised in building naval aircraft, formed in 1923 as part of the CNT (Cantiere Navale Triestino, or in English Trieste Naval Shipyard). The company produced a number of designs for the Italian military, but ceased operations in 1944.

== History ==
In 1921, the Cosulich family of Trieste, owners of CNT decided to enter the aviation business. Already active in shipping and shipbuilding, they followed the same pattern by establishing first an air taxi service (SISA, 1921) and then a seaplane workshop at Monfalcone (within the existing shipyard) in 1923. The first successful design was the CANT 6 a three-engine biplane flying-boat bomber built in 1925. SISA trained pilots for the Regia Aeronautica (the Italian Air Force) using CANT 7 and CANT 18 biplanes; from 1926 it added airline services, using the CANT 10 and CANT 22 cabin seaplanes. The main designer was Raffaele Conflenti. The workshops survived on license production and prototypes.

In 1930, CNT merged with other shipyards to form the C.R.D.A. (Cantieri Riuniti dell'Adriatico - United Adriatic Shipbuilding), but aircraft continued to use the CANT designation. In 1933, C.R.D.A. was acquired by state conglomerate IRI, and Italo Balbo persuaded Filippo Zappata, then working with Blériot, to become chief designer. In the following nine years, CANT flew 18 new types that garnered 40 world records; it also added a landplane factory, test department, and airfield as the workforce grew from 350 to 5,000. The CANT Z.501 (1934) and Z.506 (1935) seaplanes, and the Z.1007 landplane bomber (1937) became the standard Italian types in their categories. Zappata saw wooden airplanes as a temporary necessity, and his new designs were conceived with all-metal construction, including the Z.1018 bomber twin, Z.511 four-engine floatplane airliner, and Z.515 twin floatplane.

Around 1939 Zappata became disillusioned with CANT and started negotiating with Breda, which he joined in 1942; in addition, military requirements fluctuated. The Z.1018 started in wood as "flying mockup", developed as a very different wooden preseries, and metamorphosed into metal for production with bomber, torpedo-bomber, and night-fighter variants. None of these types became operational before the Italian armistice in 1943. The ensuing German occupation and USAAF raids in March–April 1944 stopped all production, and only the shipyard was rebuilt after the war.

== Aircraft ==
- CANT 6
- CANT 7
- CANT 10
- CANT 18
- CANT 22
- CANT 25
- CANT 26
- CANT 36
- CANT 37
- CANT Z.501
- CANT Z.506
- CANT Z.508
- CANT Z.509
- CANT Z.511
- CANT Z.515
- CANT Z.1007
- CANT Z.1010
- CANT Z.1011
- CANT Z.1012
- CANT Z.1018

== Sources ==
- The Illustrated Encyclopedia of Aircraft (Part Work 1982-1985), 1985, Orbis Publishing
