= Caproni Ca.72 =

Italian 1920s bomber aircraft

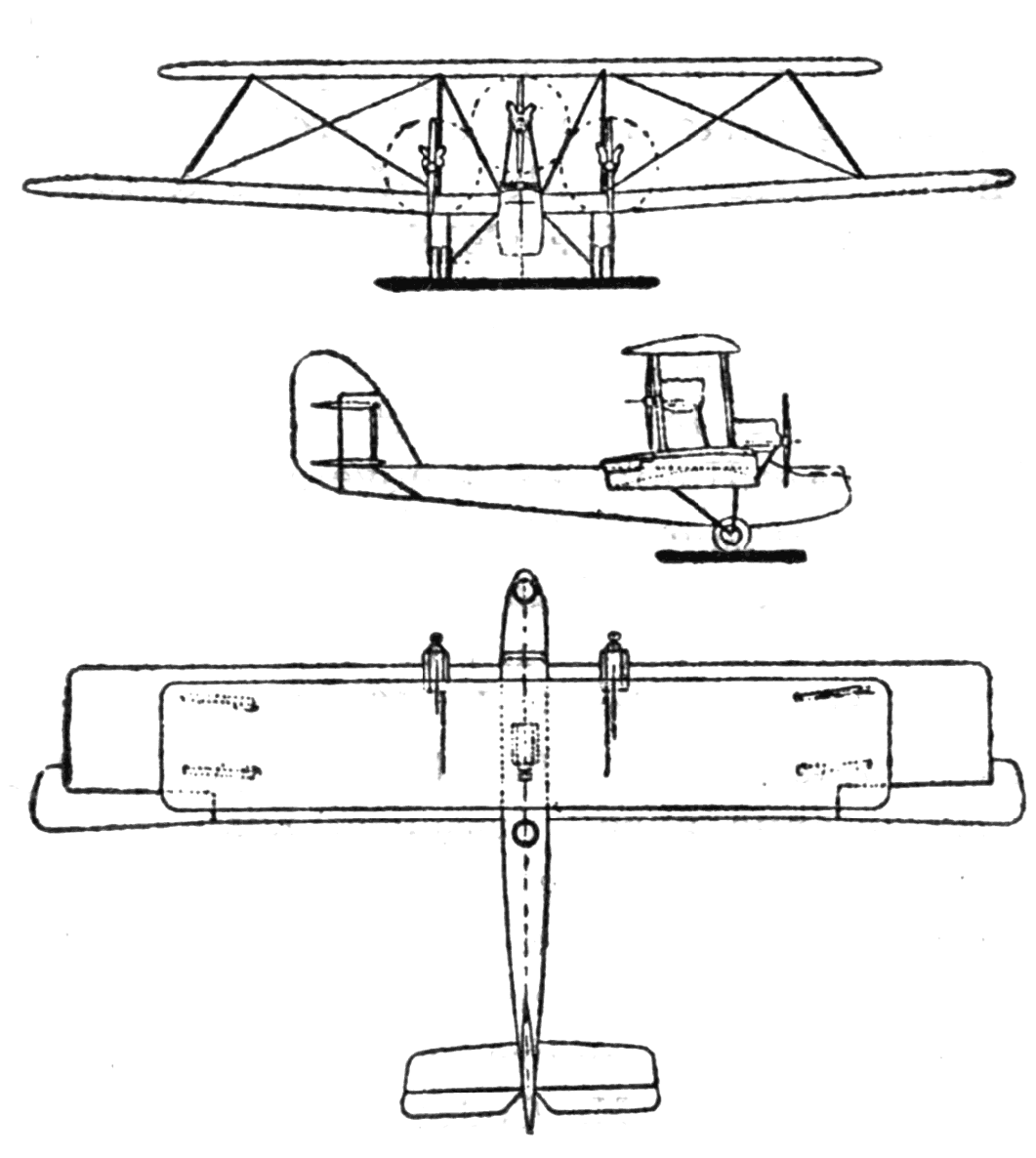

General information
- Type: Night bomber aircraft
- National origin: Italy
- Manufacturer: Caproni
- Number built: 1

History
- First flight: 1924
- Developed from: Caproni Ca.66

The Caproni Ca.72 was an Italian night bomber designed to reequip the post-World War I Italian Air Force.

== Design and development ==
The Ca.72 was, overall, similar to the Caproni Ca.66 and Caproni Ca.67 in overall design. However, the Ca.72 differed from the Ca.67 in the addition of an SPA 6A engine, mounted as a pusher on the upper mainplane centre-line. Despite these changes, flight tests offered only a 5 km/h (3.1 mph; 2.7 kn) increase in speed over the Ca.66. The Regia Aeronautica did not order the aircraft into production, and the Ca.72 was abandoned in favor of the Caproni Ca.73.

== Specifications ==
Data from , Aeroplani Caproni dal 1908 al 1935

General characteristics

- Crew: Four, pilot, co-pilot plus two gunners
- Length: 12.50 m (41 ft 0 in)
- Upper wingspan: 17 m (55 ft 9 in)
- Lower wingspan: 25 m (82 ft 0 in)
- Height: 5.60 m (18 ft 4 in)
- Wing area: 143 m^{2} (1,540 sq ft) excluding ailerons
- Empty weight: 3,670 kg (8,091 lb)
- Gross weight: 5,670 kg (12,500 lb)
- Powerplant: 2 × Lorraine Dietrich 12Db 6-cylinder water-cooled inline, 300 kW (400 hp) each
- Powerplant: 1 × SPA 6A 6-cylinder water-cooled inline, 150 kW (200 hp)
- Propellers: 2-bladed

Performance

- Maximum speed: 185 km/h (115 mph, 100 kn) at ground level
- Cruise speed: 160 km/h (99 mph, 86 kn)
- Endurance: 4 hr
- Service ceiling: 5,500 m (18,000 ft)

Armament

- Guns: 4 × 7.7 mm (0.303 in) machine guns
- Bombs: 10×100 kg (220 lb).
