= G8 (disambiguation) =

G8 is the Group of Eight, an international forum for eight industrialized nations, also known as the G7+1.

G8, G08, G.VIII, G.8, or G-8 may also refer to:

== Arts and entertainment ==
- G-8 (character), a fictional aviator

== Transportation ==
- EMD G8, a diesel locomotive and derivatives thereof
- Fiat G.8, a 1934 Italian military utility aircraft
- Gabardini G.8, a 1923 Italian fighter and military trainer aircraft
- Gotha G.VIII, a 1918 German bomber aircraft
- Pontiac G8, a full-size automobile
- BMW iX3 (G08), a compact crossover SUV

=== Airlines ===
- Air Service Gabon (former IATA code: G8), a former Gabonese airline
- Enkor (former IATA code: G8), a former Russian airline
- Go First (former IATA code: G8), a former Indian low-cost airline
- Gujarat Airways (former IATA code: G8), a former Indian airline

=== Roads ===
- G-08 (Michigan county highway)
- County Route G8 (California), a route from Santa Clara County to San Jose, California, USA

== Other uses ==
- G8 star, a subclass of G-class stars
- Gymnasium in eight years (G8), in German education
- Heckler & Koch G8 (Gewehr-8), a German designation of the Heckler & Koch HK21 machine gun

== See also ==
- 8G (disambiguation)
- G7
- Gang of Eight (disambiguation)
- Group of Eight (disambiguation)
