= Ansaldo SVA =

1917 Italian reconnaissance aircraft

SVA
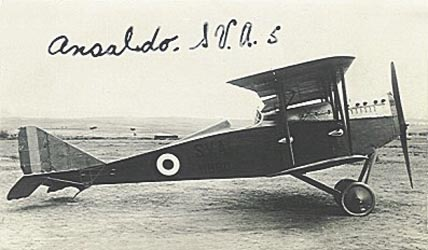
- SVA.5 Primo

General information
- Type: Reconnaissance aircraft
- Manufacturer: Gio. Ansaldo & C.
- Designer: Umberto Savoia and Rodolfo Verduzio
- Number built: 1,245

History
- First flight: 1917

The Ansaldo SVA (named for Savoia-Verduzio-Ansaldo) was a family of Italian reconnaissance biplane aircraft of World War I and the decade after. Originally conceived as a fighter, the SVA was found inadequate for that role. Its impressive speed, range and operational ceiling, with its top speed making it one of the fastest of all Allied combat aircraft of the war, gave it the right properties to be an excellent reconnaissance aircraft and even light bomber. Production of the aircraft continued well after the war, the final examples were delivered during 1918.

The SVA was a conventionally laid-out unequal-span biplane with unusual Warren Truss-style struts joining its wings having no transverse (spanwise) bracing wires. The plywood-skinned fuselage had the typical Ansaldo triangular rear cross-section behind the cockpit, turning into a rectangular cross section through the rear cockpit area, with a full rectangular cross section forward of the cockpit. Two minor variants were produced, one with reconnaissance cameras, the other without cameras but extra fuel tanks.

The Flight over Vienna propaganda flight, inspired by Italian nationalist and poet Gabriele d'Annunzio, consisting of a flight of eleven models of Ansaldo SVA-series biplanes, was carried out on 9 August 1918 by the 87th Squadriglia La Serenissima from San Pelagio. At least two of the aircraft were two-seat SVA.9 or SVA.10s to accommodate d'Annunzio for the flight he inspired, while the remainder were SVA.5 single-seaters.

== Development ==
=== Origins ===
According to aviation author Gianni Cattaneo, prior to 1916, the aviation companies of Italy were commonly producing aircraft which lacked any substantial originality or possessed noteworthy performances, albeit with some exceptions, such as the Caproni Ca.4 heavy bomber. While some figures within the industry were content to restrict their activity to forming arrangements to licence-produce foreign aircraft, particularly those of French origin, there were others who wanted to develop indigenous designs. What would become known as the SVA started life as the shared ideas of R. Verduzio and U. Savoia, two talented technical officers of Italy's Military Aviation Technical Directory.

Even as a concept, it represented a considerable evolution in design. Instead of using empirical observations, calculations of aerodynamics and structures were performed; Cattaneo claims that this was a first for the Italian industry. A small design team, headed by aeronautical engineer Celestino Rosatelli, was assembled to work on turning the conceptual aircraft into reality. During its design, it was developed to create one of the fastest aircraft of its era, coupling this with a very high range and suitability for use as a fighter. The proposals for the SV, was laid before the directors of Italian manufacturer Gio. Ansaldo & C., hoping to obtain their authorisation to proceed. The Military Aviation Technical Directory, having developed a considerable interest in the prospects of such an aircraft being produced, decided to assume control of the construction programme, making it a government project. This came with some benefits, as the Italian government provided funding to cover the development along with the cooperation of state agencies.

=== Into flight ===
During November 1916, Ansaldo commenced construction upon a new aircraft factory, known at Catiere 1, at Borzoli, outside Genoa; further factories were either established or acquired during the following two years. On 3 March 1917, the first SVA prototype performed its maiden flight from Grosseto, flown by Flight Sargeant M. Stoppani. Following this first flight, Stoppani was enthusiastic about his experience, favourably describing the prototype's handling characteristics and high speed. It was subjected to an intense test programme, being flown at various locations inside and outside Italy, for the purpose of validating the design's performance and viability. It was around this phase of work that it was decided to use the aircraft as a reconnaissance/fighter-bomber instead of a pure fighter, which represented a considerable shift in the specification; according to Cattaneo, this may have been done due to a perceived lack of maneuverability in comparison to some of its foreign competitors, such as the SPAD S.XIII and the Hanriot HD.1, and a lack of recognition amongst typical fighter pilots of its strengths, such as its speed and range.

Testing of the prototype had revealed the aircraft to possess speeds 30 mph (48 km/h) in excess of any aircraft serving on the Italian Front. The outstanding speed, in combination with its range and load capabilities, made for an impressive fast reconnaissance aircraft, being able to dispense with escorts and break off from combat with opponents at will, via its superior speed and rate of climb. Various sub-types and modifications were developed for other purposes. Initially, the prototype was followed by a slightly modified aircraft, known as the SVA.4; it functioned as a stepping stone towards the definitive production variant, the SVA.5.

=== Into production ===
The SVA was rapidly ordered into production. During late 1917, volume manufacture of the type commenced; by the end of the year, an initial batch of 65 aircraft had been produced. A number of the early aircraft produced at Cantiere 3, one of the production lines, were used to test modifications, particularly alternative engine installations. Reportedly, highly positive results were gathered on the Isotta Fraschini V.6, having cut the time to climb to 10,000 feet to only seven minutes, superior to widely used fighters such as the British Royal Aircraft Factory S.E.5 and the Germany Fokker D.VII. As such, during summer 1918, following confirmation of the performance figure via official testing conducted at Taliedo, outside Milan, it was decided to use the Isotta engine.

The Corpo Aeronautico Militare (Italian Air Corps) urged that the SVA to be provided in vast quantities; thus, production output made rapid advances. While only 65 aircraft had been completed by the end of 1917, 1,183 SVAs were built during 1918; this made the type the second-most numerous aircraft to be built by the Italian aviation industry. Around late 1917 and early 1918, licences to produce the SVA were issued to several other aircraft manufacturers with the intention of achieving a high rate of production. Some of these licensees decided to perform modifications to the aircraft, such as reducing the length and span of the wings.

On the basis of the first few months of operation, sub-models of the SVA were developed, both being twin-seater aircraft. The SVA.9, which was usually powered by the SPA 6A engine, was normally used as a trainer. The SVA.10, powered by the Isotta engine, was intended for use as a light bomber and reconnaissance aircraft, armed with a fixed gun and a flexible Lewis gun for the observer.

== Operational history ==
During early 1918, the SVA started to be issued to the second-line units, which were typically responsible for defensive missions such as the guarding of various northern Italian cities and conducting reconnaissance operations along the Italian front. During February 1918, commenced combined strategic reconnaissance and light bombing; for this purpose, special sections were organised and directly controlled by each headquarters of the Royal Italian Army. On 29 February, the first offensive operation was performed against railway infrastructure in Bolzano and Innsbruck.

During a typical bombing mission, aircraft would have to fly 200–350 mi (320–560 km), which often included two crossings of the Alps; upon approaching the target, the pilot would descend to 1,000 ft (300 m) to strafe or bomb. Reconnaissance runs by the SVA were claimed to have played a major role during the Second Battle of the Piave River, providing Italian commanders with a near-continuous photographic representation of the ground, helping them respond to rapid changes in the fighting. Imagery captured by one reconnaissance flight over the enemy harbour of Pula played a major role in a bombing raid by 70 Italian aircraft several days later. The type also performed propaganda missions during the battle, dropping leaflets over the enemy lines.

Daring reconnaissance missions on the Italian front were performed by 87 Squadriglia; on 21 May 1918, a pair of SVAs departed Ghedi, near Brescia and conducted a four-hour flight almost entirely inside hostile territory, covering 430 mi (690 km) and capturing imagery over the Austrian towns of Bregenz, Lindau and the German town of Friedrichshafen, by Lake Constance. During this period, reconnaissance flights by the type were being performed of key railway depots near-daily, building up a detailed picture of the Austro-Hungarian supply situation and the movement of reinforcements along the front. Cattaneo claims that the SVA had delivered a remarkably effective reconnaissance performance, especially for a single-engined, single-seat aircraft of the era.

== Flight over Vienna ==
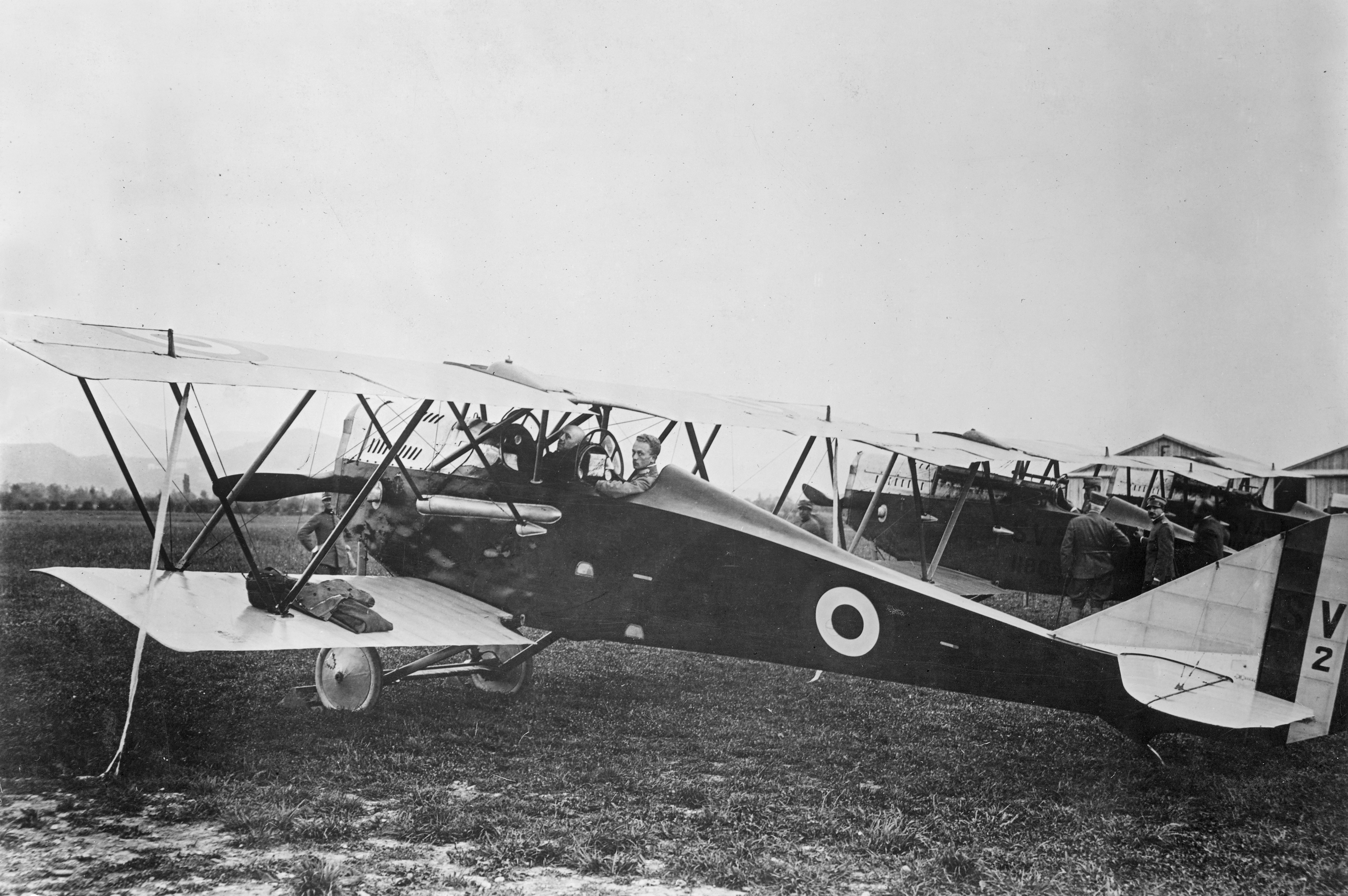
Gabriele D'Annunzio in an Ansaldo SVA-9 2-seater before the flight

Perhaps the most audacious operation involving the SVA was conducted over the skies of Vienna, the capital of the Austria-Hungarian Empire, which demonstrated the superiority of Italy over its opponent and its inability to prevent such flights from reaching into the heartland of the nation. On 9 August 1918, a flight of seven SVAs of the 87th Squadriglia La Serenissima, based in San Pelagio, flew over Vienna and dropped thousands of propaganda leaflets, which had been specially prepared by the poet, soldier and nationalist Gabriele D'Annunzio. Cattaneo observes that bombs could have been carried instead of leaflets but that this had not been the purpose of the mission. D'Annunzio flew an observer on an SVA.9.; 11 SVAs were involved. The Vienna flight had been planned for 2 August 1918 but was delayed by weather. The feat delivered a loud message of Italy's technological supremacy over Austria-Hungary and delivered a warning of its rival's impending defeat to its own populace.

== Assessment of effectiveness ==
According to Cattaneo, the SVA had been quickly regarded as perhaps the most precious intelligence gathering aircraft in Italian service and was particularly welcomed by its pilots, having amply satisfied a long-standing requirement for a fast scout–light bomber capable of defending itself. It has been claimed that reconnaissance performed by the type had been vital in the preparation of offensives, which included the Battle of Vittorio Veneto. SVAs also attacked ground units, strafing and bombing troop concentrations, communication centers, depots, railway infrastructure and airfields. This action demonstrated the operational maturity of the design, which included the development of torpedo-armed and floatplane models for the Regia Marina. The Battle of Vittorio Veneto ended the war on the Italian front and forced the withdrawal of the Austria-Hungarian Empire from the conflict.

== Variants ==
- SVA.1 - single prototype
- SVA.2 - 65 production aircraft
  - ISVA - (Idroplane - "seaplane") float-equipped version. 50 built for Italian navy
- SVA.3 - AER-built SVA.4
  - SVA.3 Ridotto ("Reduced") - fast-climbing interceptor variant for anti-Zeppelin defence. Some fitted with additional oblique-firing machine gun
- SVA.4 - first major production version. Portside Vickers gun deleted to save weight for cameras.
- SVA.5 - definitive production version
- SVA.6 - prototype bomber version
- SVA.8 - single prototype; nature unclear
- SVA.9 - two-seat unarmed reconnaissance version with larger wings. Intended as pathfinder for SVA.5 formations and as trainer. Used in the 1920 Rome-Tokyo Raid.
- SVA.10 - two-seat armed reconnaissance version with 250 hp (190 kW) Isotta Fraschini engine and fitted with a forward firing gun and a Lewis gun on a flexible mounting in the rear cockpit

== Operators ==
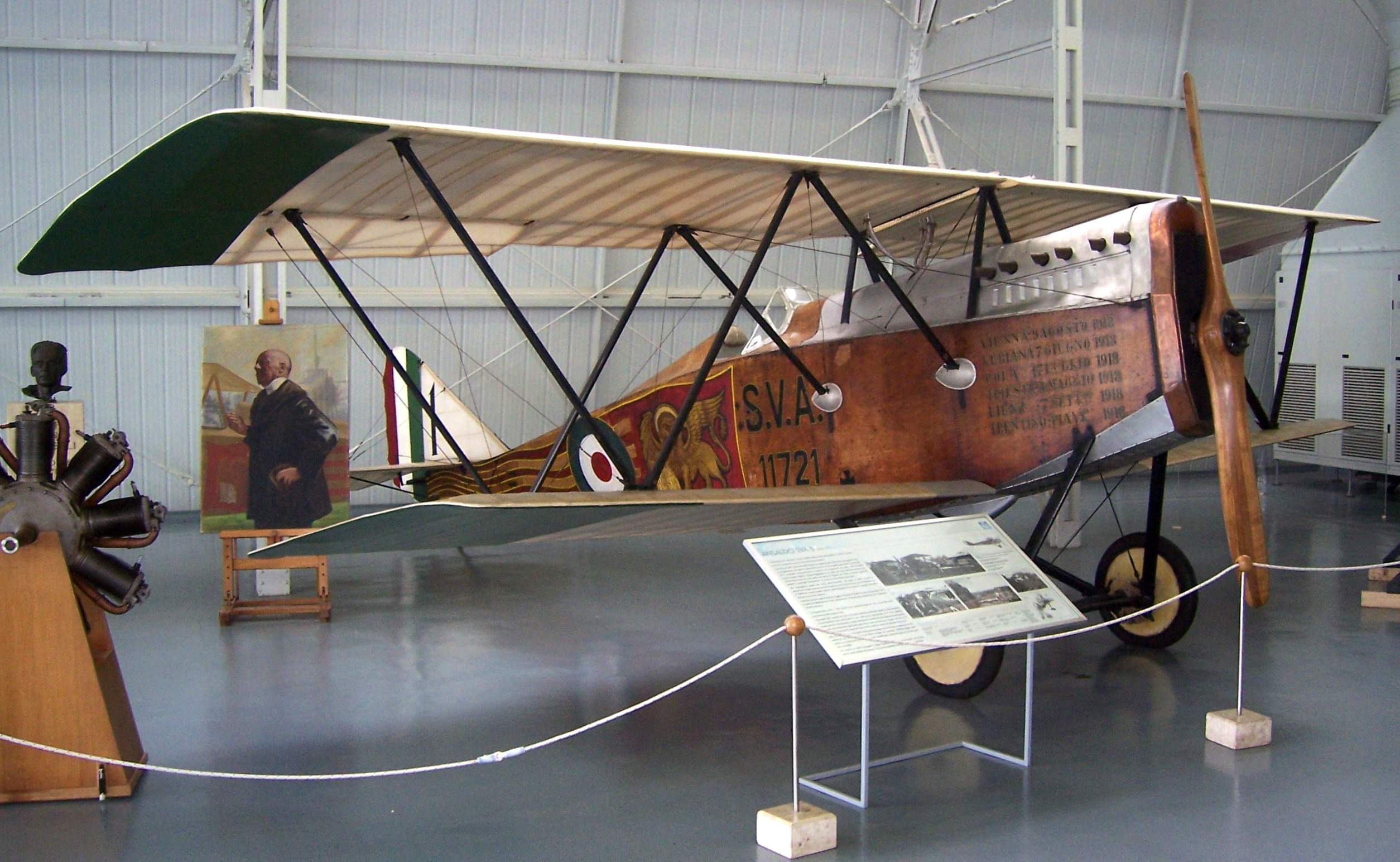
Ansaldo SVA.5 in the Vigna di Valle Air Force Historical Museum

Argentina

- Army Aviation Service

Brazil

- Brazilian Naval Aviation 12 Brazilian pilots trained in these planes, but the war ended before they can participate it

China

- West-North Aviation Corps of Warlord Feng Yuxiang, 12 aircraft, 1925

Ecuador

- Ecuadorian Air Force

Kingdom of Italy

- Corpo Aeronautico Militare

Georgia

- Georgian Air Force - 10 aircraft 1920

Latvia

- Latvian Air Force

Lithuania

- Lithuanian Air Force, 10 SVA-10, purchased in 1923

Paraguay

- Paraguayan Air Force

Poland

- Polish Air Force - 80 aircraft SVA.9

Soviet Union

- Soviet Air Force

United States

- American Expeditionary Force

Uruguay

- Uruguayan Air Force

Kingdom of Yugoslavia

- Yugoslav Royal Air Force - one aircraft

== Specifications (SVA.5) ==
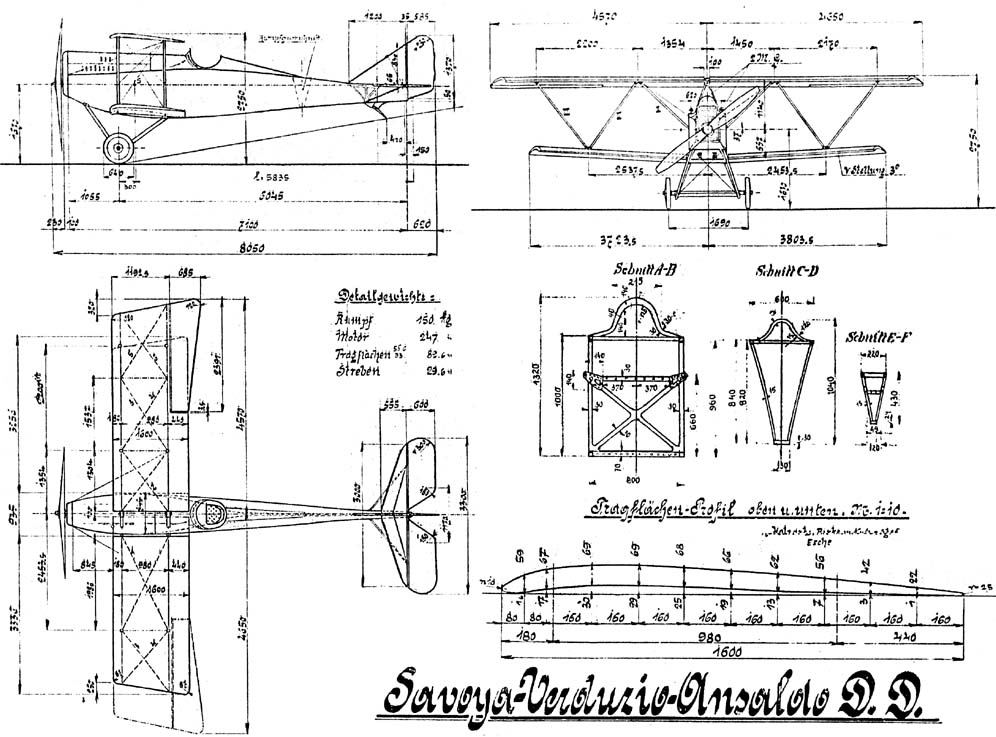
German Baubeschreibung drawing of an Ansaldo SVA

Data from The S.V.A. (Ansaldo) Scouts

General characteristics

- Crew: 1
- Length: 8.1 m (26 ft 7 in)
- Wingspan: 9.1 m (29 ft 10 in)
- Height: 2.65 m (8 ft 8 in)
- Wing area: 24.2 m^{2} (260 sq ft)
- Empty weight: 680 kg (1,499 lb)
- Gross weight: 1,050 kg (2,315 lb)
- Powerplant: 1 × SPA 6A 6-cylinder water-cooled in-line piston engine, 150 kW (200 hp)
- Propellers: 2-bladed wood fixed-pitch propeller

Performance

- Maximum speed: 230 km/h (140 mph, 120 kn)
- Range: 690 km (430 mi, 370 nmi)
- Endurance: 3 hours
- Service ceiling: 6,000 m (20,000 ft)
- Rate of climb: 5 m/s (980 ft/min)

Armament

- Guns: 2 × synchronised .303 in (7.7 mm) Vickers machine guns
- Bombs: up to 90 kg (200 lb) of bombs

== See also ==
- Flight over Vienna
