= CA67 =

CA67 or CA-67 may refer to:

- Otōbashi Station, a railway station in Nakagawa-ku, Nagoya, Japan (station code CA67)
- Caproni Ca.67, an Italian aircraft
- California State Route 67
