= Gabardini G.9 =

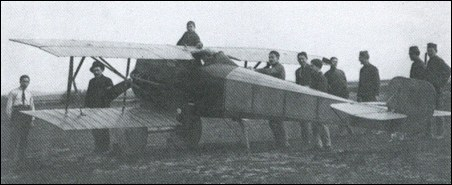
- Gabardini G.9

General information
- Type: Fighter and trainer
- National origin: Italy
- Manufacturer: Gabardini
- Designer: Ing Filippo Zappata (G.9bis redesign)

History
- First flight: 1923

The Gabardini G.9 was an Italian single-seat biplane fighter prototype produced by Gabardini in 1923.

== Design and development ==
=== G.9 ===
Gabardini designed the G.9 in parallel with its work on its first fighter design, the Gabardini G.8, which had a similar wing cellule. The G.9 was a metal, fabric-covered, single-bay biplane which differed from the unequal-span G.8 by having a shorter-span upper wing and less cabane bracing. It was powered by the 164-kilowatt (220-horsepower) SPA 6A engine - a more powerful engine than that of any G.8 variant, driving a two-bladed propeller.

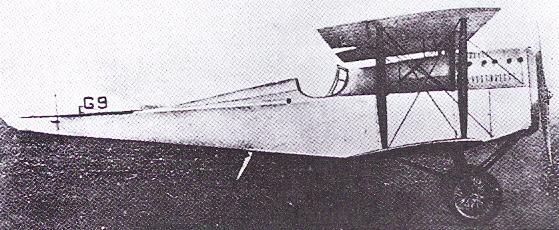
Gabardini G.9

The Regia Aeronautica (Italian Royal Air Force) did not place a production order for the G.9

=== G.9bis ===
Gabardini re-engined the G.9 with the 224-kilowatt (300-horsepower) Hispano-Suiza HS 42, replaced its frontal radiator with two radiators mounted on the sides of the fuselage above the leading edge of the wing, raised its cockpit, increased the gap between its fuselage and upper wing, and increased the height of its undercarriage to create the G.9bis. After Ing Filippo Zappata (1894-1994) joined Gabardini in 1923, he further modified the G.9bis; among various changes he made were an improved engine cowling intended to reduce aerodynamic drag and the mounting of a large propeller spinner.

In October 1923, Victor Emmanuel III (1869-1947), King of Italy (1900-1946), visited Cameri airfield, where he observed a demonstration of the G.9bis. Flown by Lodovico Zanibelli, the G.9bis achieved a maximum speed of 250 kilometers per hour (155 miles per hour) during the demonstration. However, the Regia Aeronautica was no more interested in the G.9bis version of the aircraft than it had been in the G.9 version, and no production order resulted.

== Variants ==
G.9
Original version with SPA 6A engine
G.9bis
Modified version with more powerful Hispano-Suiza HS 42 engine, raised cockpit, and lengthened undercarriage

== Operators ==
Kingdom of Italy

- Regia Aeronautica

== Specifications (G.9) ==
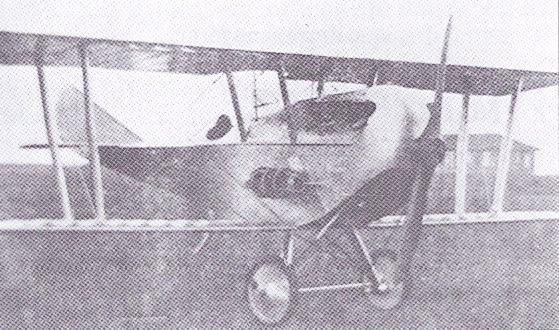
The Gabardini G.9bis prior to installation of its large propeller spinner

General characteristics

- Crew: one
- Length: 6 m (19 ft 8 in)
- Wingspan: 7 m (23 ft 0 in)
- Wing area: 18 m^{2} (190 sq ft)
- Powerplant: 1 × SPA 6A 6-cyl. water-cooled in-line piston engine, 164 kW (220 hp)

Performance

- Maximum speed: 235 km/h (146 mph, 127 kn)
- Rate of climb: 5.55 m/s (1,093 ft/min)
- Time to altitude: 5,000 m (16,000 ft) in 15 minutes

== See also ==
Related development

- Gabardini G.8
