= Group of Eight (disambiguation) =

The Group of Eight (G8) is an international forum for eight industrialized nations, also known as the G7+1.

Group of Eight may also refer to:

- Group of Eight (Australian universities) (Go8), an association of Australian universities
- Group of Eight (music), a Spanish group close to the Generation of '27

== See also ==
- G8 (disambiguation)
- Gang of Eight (disambiguation)
- Group 8 element, of the periodic table
