= Aircraft of Nuremberg =

Media hoax in World War I

The aircraft of Nuremberg refers to a media hoax in which one or several French aircraft allegedly dropped bombs near Nuremberg, Germany on August 2, 1914, a day prior to Germany's declaration of war on France.

== Report ==
On August 2, 1914 several German special edition newspaper leaflets - claiming to cite military sources - reported that French aircraft had dropped bombs near Nuremberg without a French declaration of war, thus violating international law. According to Max Montgelas bombings of the railway lines Würzburg-Nuremberg and Ansbach-Nuremberg had been reported at the Nuremberg railway headquarters. The report was passed on to the III. Bavarian Army Command who conditionally informed the General Staff. After the message had turned out to be false a clarification note was issued. However, the Nuremberg railway headquarters who had initially reported to the railway department of the General Staff failed to deliver the clarification.

Otto Gessler, then mayor of Nuremberg stated that the message was based on incorrect observations of a group of Home Guard men (Landsturm) who had confused the interplay of cloud shadows with enemy aircraft and then reported to their superiors. The incorrect observations were forwarded without proper examination. Although neither any bombings took place nor was there French aircraft sighted on August 2, another French plane might indeed have been attacked on August 1 while traversing the Nuremberg airspace.

Nevertheless, the story seems to have suited the General Staff's agenda. On August 2 the Bavarian military plenipotentiary in Berlin reported to Munich: "Welcoming news of a bombing at Nuremberg by French aircraft has arrived from our III. Army Command. Without even waiting for a diplomatic act the Ministry of War and the General Staff now have declared France an enemy."

== Consequences ==
It is not certain what impact the message had on the decision makings for the declaration of war. Anyway, the alleged incident was mentioned in the German declaration of war on France on August 3, 1914, which was presented at 6 pm. The message had already been passed on to Italy and England on August 2 without further verification, although at that time it was probably clear it was a hoax because the Prussian envoy in Munich had telegraphed to the Chancellor on the evening of August 2 that the report was not confirmed. (alleged arrival of the telegram was only in the afternoon of August 3).

The German Ambassador to Belgium used the allegations to claim to the Belgian Ministry of Foreign Affairs that France would not respect the Belgian neutrality guaranteed by the Treaty of London, and that it must therefore agree to Germany's ultimatum to allow troops to enter and temporarily occupy the country to repel a French invasion. Since Germany had already invaded Luxembourg and since Germany's ultimatum in itself was a violation of international law, the Belgian government rejected the claim, and the German invasion of Belgium commenced.

Chancellor Theobald von Bethmann Hollweg refers to the alleged attack on August 4:

"Gentlemen, we are now in self-defense; and necessity knows no law."

"Nuremberg" was, however, not explicitly mentioned in his Reichstag speech. Bethmann Hollweg spoke only of "French air raids on southern Germany". Emperor Wilhelm II remarked in relation to the alleged incident on 2 August 1914:

"...now the French have started the war and violate international law with their bomb dropping aircraft."

Rumors of aircraft attacks on railways in Wesel and Karlsruhe followed, eventually all proved to be hoaxes. An official clarification was never issued. After the end of World War I the "Aircraft of Nuremberg" became part of the acrimonious war guilt debate.

To make confusion complete an article in The New York Times from 1916 reports of a telegraphic message of 1 August on a bombing of Neuenburg am Rhein. Newspaper reports subsequently turned "Neuenburg" into "Nuremberg".

== See also ==
- Flight over Vienna

== Bibliography ==
- Florian Altenhöner: Kommunikation und Kontrolle. Gerüchte und städtische Öffentlichkeiten in Berlin und London 1914/1918. Oldenbourg, München 2008, ISBN 3-486-58183-X, S. 171–173.
- Oscar Bloch: La Vérité sur les avions de Nuremberg. Étude sur les responsabilités de la guerre. Dangon, Paris 1922.
