= Breda A.8 =

Prototype twin-engined biplane

A.8

General information
- Type: Night bomber
- National origin: Italy
- Manufacturer: Società Italiana Ernesto Breda
- Number built: 1

History
- First flight: 1927
- Developed from: Breda A.3

The Breda A.8 was a prototype twin-engined biplane, designed by Società Italiana Ernesto Breda, as a night bomber in 1927.

== Design and development ==
The A.8, designed as an improvement to the Breda A.3, was modified to rectify problems experienced with the A.3. When the aircraft was tested using two 330 kW (440 hp) Lorraine-Dietrich 12Db engines, the results were quite modest. In response, the designers changed to 370 kW (500 hp) Isotta Fraschini Asso 500 engines, but the performance was still disappointing and the design was abandoned.

== Specifications ==
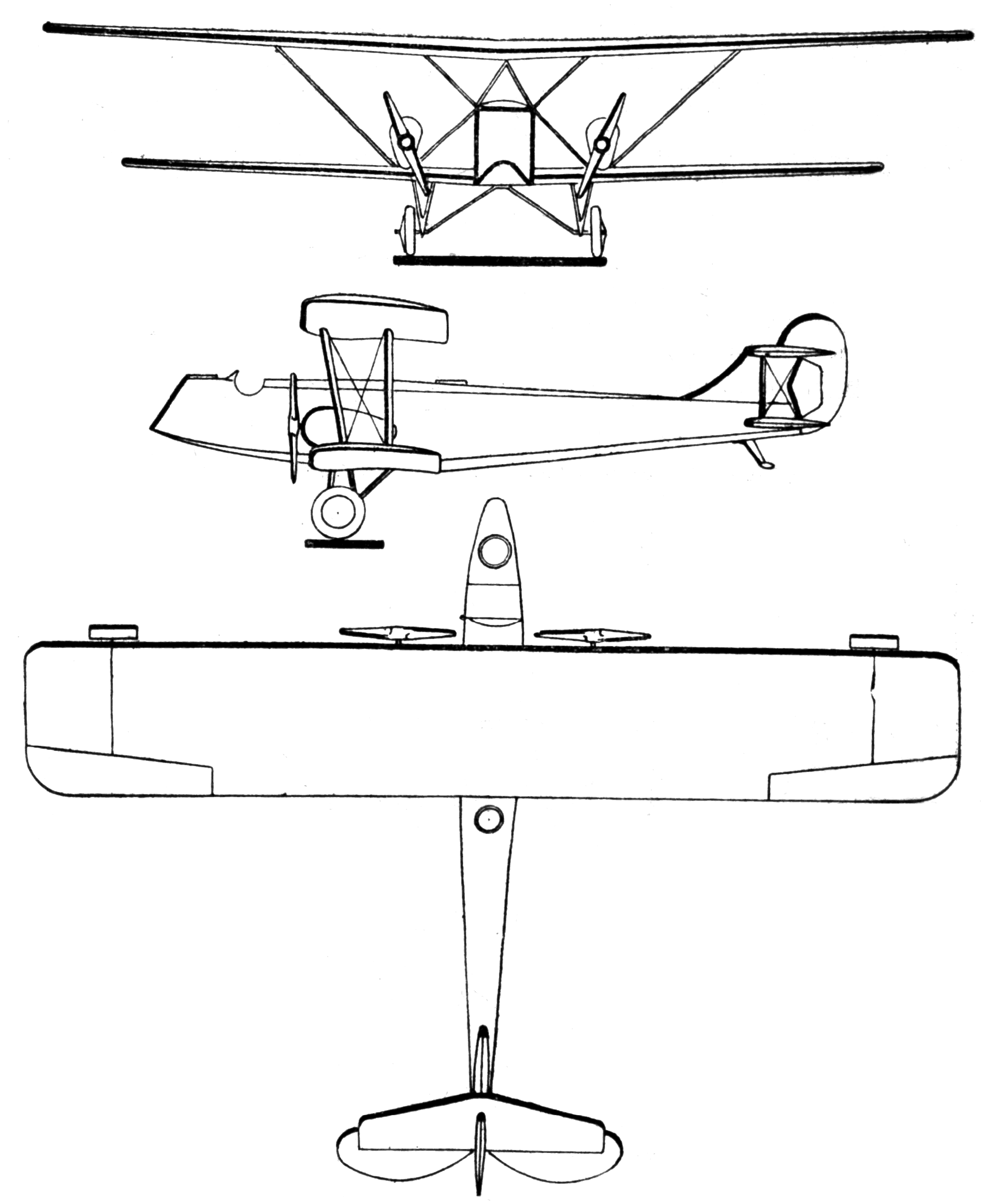
Breda A.8 3-view drawing from Les Ailes March 10,1927

Data from Jane's all the World's Aircraft 1928

General characteristics

- Crew: four
- Capacity: 1,800 kg (4,000 lb) disposable load
- Length: 16.7 m (54 ft 9 in)
- Wingspan: 23 m (75 ft 6 in)
- Height: 5.5 m (18 ft 1 in)
- Wing area: 143 m^{2} (1,540 sq ft)
- Empty weight: 3,800 kg (8,378 lb)
- Gross weight: 5,600 kg (12,346 lb)
- Powerplant: 2 × Lorraine-Dietrich 12Db V-12 water-cooled piston engines, 330 kW (440 hp) each

Performance

- Maximum speed: 175 km/h (109 mph, 94 kn)
- Endurance: 6h
- Service ceiling: 3,500 m (11,500 ft)
- Wing loading: 39 kg/m^{2} (8.0 lb/sq ft)

Armament

- Guns: 3x 7.7 mm (0.30 in) Lewis machine-guns in nose, dorsal and ventral positions
- Bombs: 800 kg (1,800 lb) of bombs
