= Breda A.3 =

Prototype twin-engined biplane

A.3
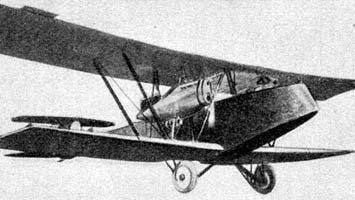
- Sole prototype of the Breda A.3

General information
- Type: Night bomber
- National origin: Italy
- Manufacturer: Società Italiana Ernesto Breda
- Number built: 1

History
- First flight: 1924
- Developed into: Breda A.8

The Breda A.3 was a prototype twin-engined biplane, designed by Società Italiana Ernesto Breda, as a night bomber in 1924.

== Design and development ==
After entering the civil aviation market, in the early part of the 1920s, Breda envisaged its first military aircraft design, the A.3. biplane bomber, utilizing the sesquiplane configuration, also featuring a biplane tail and four engines arranged in tandem nacelles. Early test flights with the SPA 6A engines showed very modest performance, so it was decided to replace the four SPA 6As with two Lorraine 12Db V-12 engines, each yielding 298 kW (400 hp). However, this modification failed to translate into much better performance, and development of the A.3 was halted.

Given the disappointing performance of the A.3, Breda conceived a new night bomber with better performance than the A.3 the Breda A.8.

== Specifications ==
Data from Annuario dell'aeronautica Italiana 1929-30

General characteristics

- Crew: three
- Capacity: 1,800 kg (4,000 lb) disposable load
- Length: 17 m (55 ft 9 in)
- Wingspan: 23 m (75 ft 6 in)
- Wing area: 148 m^{2} (1,590 sq ft)
- Empty weight: 3,850 kg (8,488 lb)
- Gross weight: 5,650 kg (12,456 lb)
- Powerplant: 4 × SPA 6A 6-cylinder water-cooled in-line piston engines, 160 kW (220 hp) each
- Propellers: 2-bladed fixed-pitch propellers

Performance

- Maximum speed: 175 km/h (109 mph, 94 kn)
- Stall speed: 75 km/h (47 mph, 40 kn)
- Endurance: 6h
- Service ceiling: 4,000 m (13,000 ft)
- Wing loading: 38 kg/m^{2} (7.8 lb/sq ft)

Armament

- Guns: 3x 7.7 mm (0.30 in) Lewis guns in nose, dorsal and ventral positions
- Bombs: 800 kg (1,800 lb) of bombs
