= 8G =

8G or 8-G can refer to:

- Angel Air (IATA: 8G), a Thai airline
- RIM-8 Talos, also MQM-8G, a long-range naval surface-to-air missile
- The 8G Band, the house band for Late Night with Seth Meyers
- Luscombe 8G, a model of Luscombe 8 aircraft

== See also ==
- G8 (disambiguation)
