= Gabardini G.8 =

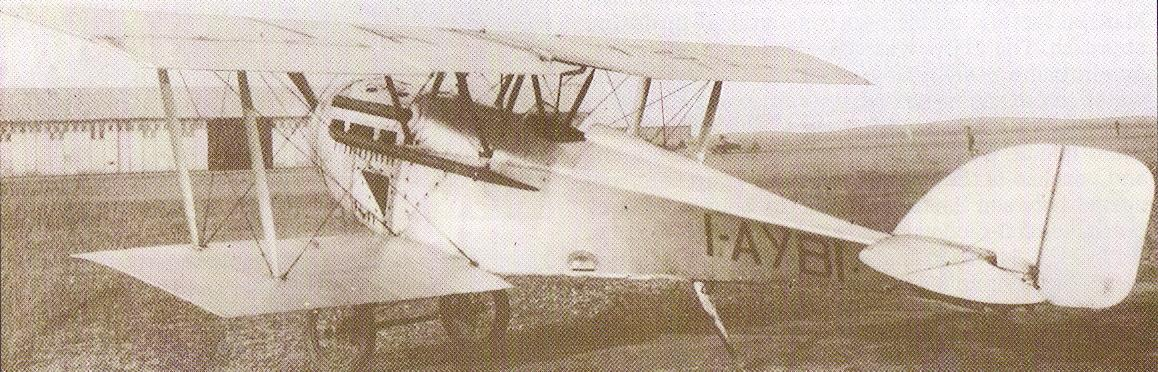
- Gabardini G.8

General information
- Type: Fighter and trainer
- National origin: Italy
- Manufacturer: Gabardini

History
- First flight: 1923

The Gabardini G.8 was an Italian single-seat aircraft produced in both fighter and trainer versions by Gabardini in 1923.

== Design and development ==
=== G.8 ===
Until 1923, the Gabardini company had produced only instructional aircraft for use by flight training schools, but in 1923 it offered a new aircraft, the G.8, in both advanced trainer and fighter versions. It was the company's first venture into military trainer or fighter production.

The G.8 was a metal single-bay biplane with fabric covering, a frontal radiator, and a two-bladed propeller. The wings were of unequal span, with the upper wing of greater span than the lower, and the aircraft had ailerons only on its upper wing. The trainer version was unarmed and powered by a Hispano-Suiza 8A V8 engine rated at 104 kilowatts (140 horsepower), while the fighter was armed with two 7.7-millimeter (0.303-inch) Vickers machine guns synchronized to fire through the propeller and had a 149-kilowatt (200-horsepower) Hispano Suiza V8.

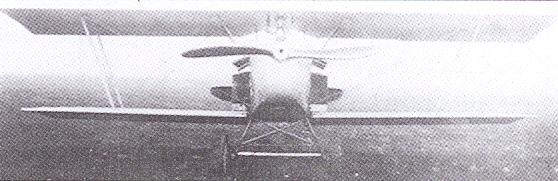
A frontal view of the G.8bis, clearly displaying the radiators mounted on either side of the fuselage, replacing the frontal radiator of the G.8.

The G.8 was designed in parallel with the Gabardini G.9 and had a similar wing cellule, but differed from the G.9 in having more cabane bracing and a longer-span upper wing.

=== G.8bis ===
Gabardini further developed the G.8 in the G.8bis model. The G.8bis had a 134-kilowatt (180-horsepower) Hispano-Suiza HS 34 engine driving a two-bladed propeller, and differed from the G.8 in having a longer-span lower wing and radiators attached to the sides of its fuselage over the wing leading edges instead of a frontal radiator.

== Operational history ==
The Regia Aeronautica (Italian Royal Air Force) did not place a production order for either model of the G.8 or for the G.8bis. Gabardini retained all the G.8 aircraft for instructional use at its flight training school at Cameri.

== Variants ==
G.8 trainer
Unarmed version with lower-rated engine
G.8 fighter
Armed version with more powerful engine
G.8bis
Modified version with different engine and radiator and lower wing of greater span

== Operators ==
Kingdom of Italy

- Regia Aeronautica

== Specifications (G.8 fighter) ==
General characteristics

- Crew: one
- Length: 5.55 m (18 ft 3 in)
- Wingspan: 8.34 m (27 ft 4 in)
- Height: 2.8 m (9 ft 2 in)
- Wing area: 22.06 m^{2} (237.5 sq ft)
- Empty weight: 580 kg (1,279 lb)
- Gross weight: 780 kg (1,720 lb)
- Powerplant: 1 × Hispano-Suiza 8A V-8 water-cooled piston engine, 149 kW (200 hp)

Performance

- Maximum speed: 206 km/h (128 mph, 111 kn)
- Rate of climb: 5.2 m/s (1,020 ft/min)
- Time to altitude: 1,000 m (3,300 ft) in 3 minutes 12 seconds

Armament

- Guns: 2 × fixed forward-firing 7.7-mm (0.303-in) Vickers machine guns

== See also ==
Related development

- Gabardini G.9
