= Gang of Eight =

Gang of Eight may refer to:

== Politics ==
- Gang of Eight (intelligence), leaders within the U.S. Congress for intelligence matters
- Gang of Eight (fiscal matters), leaders within the U.S. Congress for fiscal matters
- Gang of Eight (immigration), leaders within the U.S. Senate who wrote the 2013 immigration bill
- Gang of Eight (Soviet Union), officials who attempted a coup against Mikhail Gorbachev
- Gang of Eight, Canadian premiers who opposed Pierre Trudeau's proposed Charter of Rights and Freedoms during patriation
- The Eight Tigers, a group of powerful eunuchs during the reign of the Ming Zhengde Emperor

== Other uses ==
- The Gang of Eight, a 1962 Mexican-Spanish film

== See also ==
- Gang of Four (disambiguation)
- Group of Eight (disambiguation)
