= SPA 6A =

1910s Italian piston aircraft engine

6A
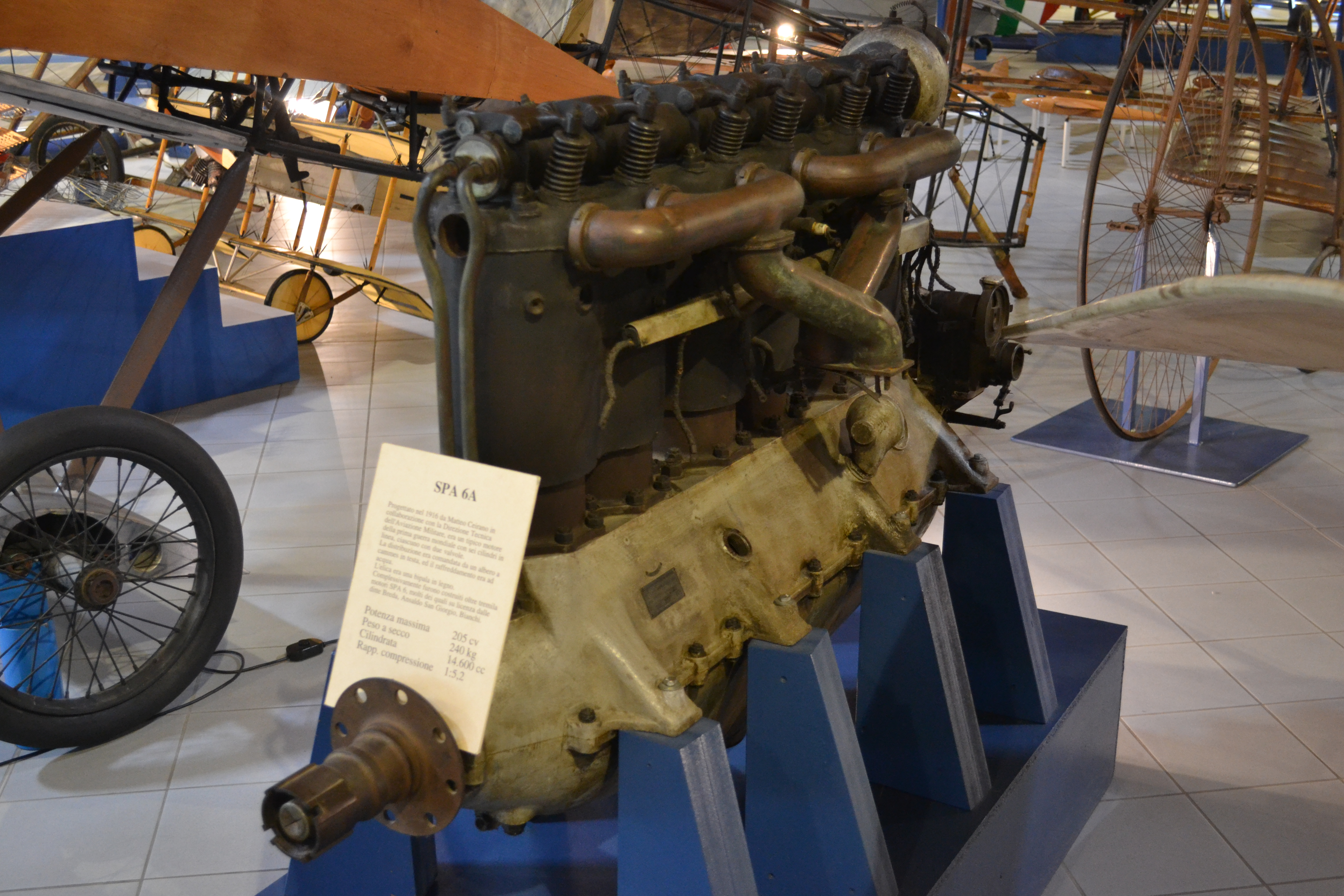
- S.P.A. 6A engine on display at the Gianni Caproni Museum of Aeronautics
- Type: Water-cooled Piston aero engine
- National origin: Italy
- Manufacturer: Società Piemontese Automobili (S.P.A.), Ansaldo, Breda, Talomona, Industrie Mecchaniche e Ferroviarie of Arezzo
- First run: c. 1916
- Major applications: Ansaldo SVA
- Number built: 3,000

The SPA 6A is an Italian water-cooled inline six-cylinder aero engine of the World War I era. The SPA 6A is mostly known for its use in the Ansaldo SVA high speed reconnaissance aircraft.

== Design and development ==
The Societa Piemontese Automobili (SPA) of Turin, Italy started building aircraft engines in 1908 and prior to 1916 had built flat, vee and radial engines. In 1916 SPA began manufacturing a straight-six engine known as the 6A.

The SPA 6A was designed with steel cylinders arranged in pairs with a common welded water jacket. The type made use of relatively advanced features such as aluminium pistons and a 6 degree overlap in valve timing.

The engine was ordered into mass production by the Italian Military Aviation Technical Division to equip the Ansaldo SVA aircraft. In addition to production by SPA, the 6A engine was manufactured by Ansaldo, Breda, Talomona and Industrie Mecchaniche e Ferroviarie of Arezzo.

The Ansaldo SVA was one of the fastest aircraft of WW1 with a top speed of 230 km/h (143 mph). During WW1, Anasaldo SVAs made a sensational flight over Vienna to drop propaganda leaflets. Other famous exploits of the Ansaldo SVA included a 1920 Rome-Tokyo flight and a 1919 crossing of the Andes.

Around 3,000 SPA 6A engines were produced in three variants: normal, semi super-compressed and super-compressed. Engines of this type remained in service until the 1930s.

== Variants ==
SPA 6A Normal
Originally rated for 150 hp (112 kW) at 1,600 rpm with a displacement of 14.6 L (891 cu in) and a weight of 240 kg (529 lb). Maximum power 201 hp (150 kW).
SPA 6A Semi-Super-Compressed
Identical to the normal 6A, but with the cylinder bore increased to 137 mm (5.39 in), and with a capacity of 15.03 L (917 cu in). Rated for 210 hp (157 kW) but could develop 235 hp (175 kW) at 1,700 rpm.
SPA 6-2-A Super-Compressed
Displacement 16.62 L (1,014 cu in) bore increased to 140 mm (5.51 in) bore and 180 mm (7.09 in) stroke, with a weight of 270 kg (595 lb). Rated at 250 hp (186 kW) but could develop 310 hp (231 kW) at 1,850 rpm.

== Applications ==
- Ansaldo A.1 Balilla
- Ansaldo SVA
- Bartel BM.5
- Breda A.2
- Breda A.3
- Breda A.9 and A.9bis
- CANT 7ter
- Caproni Ca.66
- Gabardini G.9
- SIAI S.50

== Specifications (6A Normal) ==
Data from Angle

=== General characteristics ===
- Type: Inline six-cylinder piston engine
- Bore: 135 mm (5.31 in)
- Stroke: 170 mm (6.69 in)
- Displacement: 14.57 L (888.9 cu in)
- Dry weight: 255 kg (562 lb)

=== Components ===
- Valvetrain: SOHC, two valves per cylinder
- Fuel system: Twin Zenith carburettors or one Duplex Zenith type 55-DC carburettor
- Oil system: Dry-sump
- Cooling system: Water-cooled
- Reduction gear: Direct-drive
- Twin Marelli ignition magnetos

=== Performance ===
- Power output: 110 kW (150 hp) at 1,600 rpm (rated). 150 kW (200 hp) at 1,600 rpm (maximum).
- Compression ratio: 5.2:1
- Specific fuel consumption: 0.288 kg/kWh (0.473 lb/(hp⋅h))
- Oil consumption: 0.02 kg/kWh (0.033 lb/(hp⋅h))
- Power-to-weight ratio: 0.439 kW/kg (0.267 hp/lb)

== See also ==
Comparable engines

- Austro-Daimler 6
- BMW IIIa
- Hiero 6
- Liberty L-6
- Mercedes D.III

Related lists

- List of aircraft engines
