= Borzoli =

- Quartiere
- Location within Liguria Location within Italy
- Coordinates: 44°26′03″N 8°52′07″E
- Country: Italy
- Region: Liguria
- Province: Province of Genoa
- Area code: 010

Borzoli is a quartiere of the Italian city of Genoa, located west of the city centre.
