= Caproni Ca.66 =

General information
- Type: Night bomber aircraft
- National origin: Italy
- Manufacturer: Caproni
- Number built: 2

History
- First flight: c.1923
- Developed into: Caproni Ca.67

The Caproni Ca.66 was an Italian night bomber designed to reequip the post-World War I Italian Air Force. Only two examples of the four-engined biplane were built.

== Design and development ==
From 1914 Caproni had produced a series of multi-engined bombers, several of which served in numbers with the Italian Air Force. The Ca.66 originated in reviews of Italian air force requirements post World War I, set down by the new Fascist government of 1922, but as part of a second phase of new designs to succeed a first phase of improved wartime aircraft. Until the appearance of the Ca.66, all Caproni bombers had been twin-boom aircraft but the new model had a conventional layout. It had four engines and was a biplane with a shorter span upper wing, though not formally a sesquiplane as the ratio of the areas of the two wing was about 0.6.

Both wings were rectangular in plan but only the lower one carried dihedral (3.5°) and the overhung, balanced ailerons. They were built around pairs of spars and were of mixed wood and metal construction with fabric covering; their thick sections provided internal rigidity and allowed a single-bay structure, with pairs of parallel, inward leaning interplane struts between the spars.

Its 150 kW (200 hp) SPA 6A engines were mounted midway between the wings in push-pull configuration. Each engine had its own cylindrical Lamblin radiator underneath; the tractors had theirs offset outboard and the pushers inboard. The engine pairs were on near-vertical, faired struts between the upper and lower wing spars; more struts to the upper and lower fuselage further strengthened the mountings.

The main part of the fuselage of the Ca.66, including the covering, was entirely wooden, rectangular in section and 12.50 m (41 ft 0 in) long. Only its projecting, ovoid nose was metal. There were four crew seats: a gunner's position in the extreme nose, side-by-side seating in the pilots' cockpit ahead of the propellers and lower wing leading edge and a dorsal gunner's position half under the trailing edge. Aft, the fuselage tapered in plan to a conventional, straight-tapered fin and a balanced rudder which reached to the keel beyond the end of the fuselage. The Ca.66 had a biplane horizontal tail with curved leading edges, its planes braced to each other with parallel pairs of vertical struts on each side. From the lower attachment points of these struts three more struts braced the tailplane to the lower fuselage longeron, one from the rear point and two more in a forward-reaching V from the forward one.

The mainwheels of the Caproni's conventional landing gear were on independent cranked axles from the lower longerons which positioned them under the engines, 3.52 m (11 ft 7 in) apart. Each axle end was supported by three steel struts, two from the forward wing spar and one from the rear; the forward pair were elastically sprung within the wing. The undercarriage struts, as well as those mounting the engines, were designed to be faired-in but the few known photographs of the Ca.66, unlike the three-views, do not show fairings in place.

The Ca.66 carried ten 100 kg (220 lb) bombs on a rack controlled by the co-pilot. The front gunner had a 7.7 mm (0.303 in) machine gun on a flexible mount, as did the dorsal gunner who also had a rearward, downward firing gun.

The date of the Ca.66's first flight is uncertain. Despite its origins in the 1922 programme, leading some sources to state that the first flight was in that year, the French journal Les Ailes referred to it as a "new Caproni" in October 1924. Only two were built, even though the Ca.66 won the Air Ministry contest held at Montecelio.

== Specifications ==
Data from Les Ailes, March 1924

General characteristics

- Crew: Four, pilot, co-pilot plus two gunners
- Length: 12.50 m (41 ft 0 in) length of rectangular fuselage only, excluding ovoid nose and the rudder
- Upper wingspan: 17 m (55 ft 9 in) slight underestimate
- Lower wingspan: 25 m (82 ft 0 in) including ailerons
- Height: 5.60 m (18 ft 4 in)
- Wing area: 143 m^{2} (1,540 sq ft) excluding ailerons
- Empty weight: 3,520 kg (7,760 lb)
- Gross weight: 5,500 kg (12,125 lb)
- Powerplant: 4 × SPA 6A 6-cylinder water-cooled inline, 150 kW (200 hp) each
- Propellers: 2-bladed

Performance

- Maximum speed: 180 km/h (110 mph, 97 kn) at ground level
- Stall speed: 87 km/h (54 mph, 47 kn)
- Endurance: 4 hr with 1,000 kg (2,200 lb)
- Service ceiling: 4,500 m (14,800 ft) service
- Time to altitude: 9 min 42 s to 2,000 m (6,600 ft)

Armament

- Guns: 3 × 7.7 mm (0.303 in) machine guns, 1 in nose on flexible mount and 1 similar in dorsal position together with a rear firing gun.
- Bombs: 10×100 kg (220 lb).
