= Caproni Ca.67 =

Italian 1920s bomber aircraft

General information
- Type: Night bomber aircraft
- National origin: Italy
- Manufacturer: Caproni
- Number built: 2

History
- First flight: 1923
- Variant: Caproni Ca.66

The Caproni Ca.66 and Caproni Ca.67 were Italian night bomber aircraft designed to re-equip the post-World War I Regia Aeronautica.

== Design and development ==
The Ca.66 was a well built wooden aircraft with ply veneer and fabric covering, intended to carry out night bombing. The single-bay inverted sesquiplane wings were braced with streamlined struts and wires and were characterized by their squared off wing-tips, constant chord, and moderate 3° 30' dihedral on the lower mainplanes. The square section fuselage, rounded off at the nose, housed the four crew in three open cockpits with pilot and co-pilot side by side. At the aft end of the fuselage a large triangular fin, with rudder, supported the biplane tailplanes, which were also strut-braced. The tail-skid undercarriage had mainwheels on divided axles, strut-supported beneath the engines and attached to the lower longerons of the fuselage. Controls were conventional with elevators on upper and lower tailplanes, large horn-balanced rudder and horn balanced ailerons on the lower wings only.

The Ca.67 was similar to the Caproni Ca.66 in overall design and span but differed in having 2 Lorraine-Dietrich 12Db engines and increased payload. Flight tests offered no real improvement in performance over the Ca.66, and the Regia Aeronautica did not order the aircraft into production.

== Variants ==
Ca.66
Inverted sesquiplane bomber powered by four 200–220 hp (150–160 kW) SPA 6A engines in strut-supported tandem pair nacelles between the mainplanes; one built.
Ca.67
A Ca.66 powered by two 400 hp (300 kW) Lorraine-Dietrich 12Db (Isotta Fraschini 12Db?) engines in tractor nacelles mounted on the lower mainplanes; one built.

== Specifications (Ca.67) ==
Data from , Aeroplani Caproni dal 1908 al 1935

General characteristics

- Crew: Four, pilot, co-pilot plus two gunners
- Capacity: 2,400 kg (5,300 lb) payload
- Length: 12.50 m (41 ft 0 in)
- Upper wingspan: 17 m (55 ft 9 in)
- Lower wingspan: 25 m (82 ft 0 in)
- Height: 5.60 m (18 ft 4 in)
- Wing area: 143 m^{2} (1,540 sq ft) excluding ailerons
- Empty weight: 3,300 kg (7,275 lb)
- Gross weight: 5,700 kg (12,566 lb)
- Powerplant: 2 × Lorraine-Dietrich 12Db V-12 water-cooled piston engines, 300 kW (400 hp) each
- Propellers: 2-bladed fixed-pitch propellers

Performance

- Maximum speed: 180 km/h (110 mph, 97 kn) at ground level
- Cruise speed: 155 km/h (96 mph, 84 kn)
- Stall speed: 80 km/h (50 mph, 43 kn)
- Endurance: 4 hr with 1,000 kg (2,200 lb) bomb-load
- Service ceiling: 5,500 m (18,000 ft)
- Time to altitude: 1,000 m (3,300 ft) in 5 minutes; 1,000 m (3,300 ft) in 48 minutes

Armament

- Guns: 4 × 7.7 mm (0.303 in) machine guns in front and rear gunners cockpits on flexible mounts
- Bombs: 12 × 100 kg (220 lb) Lancia bombs
