= Flight over Vienna =

Air raid during World War I

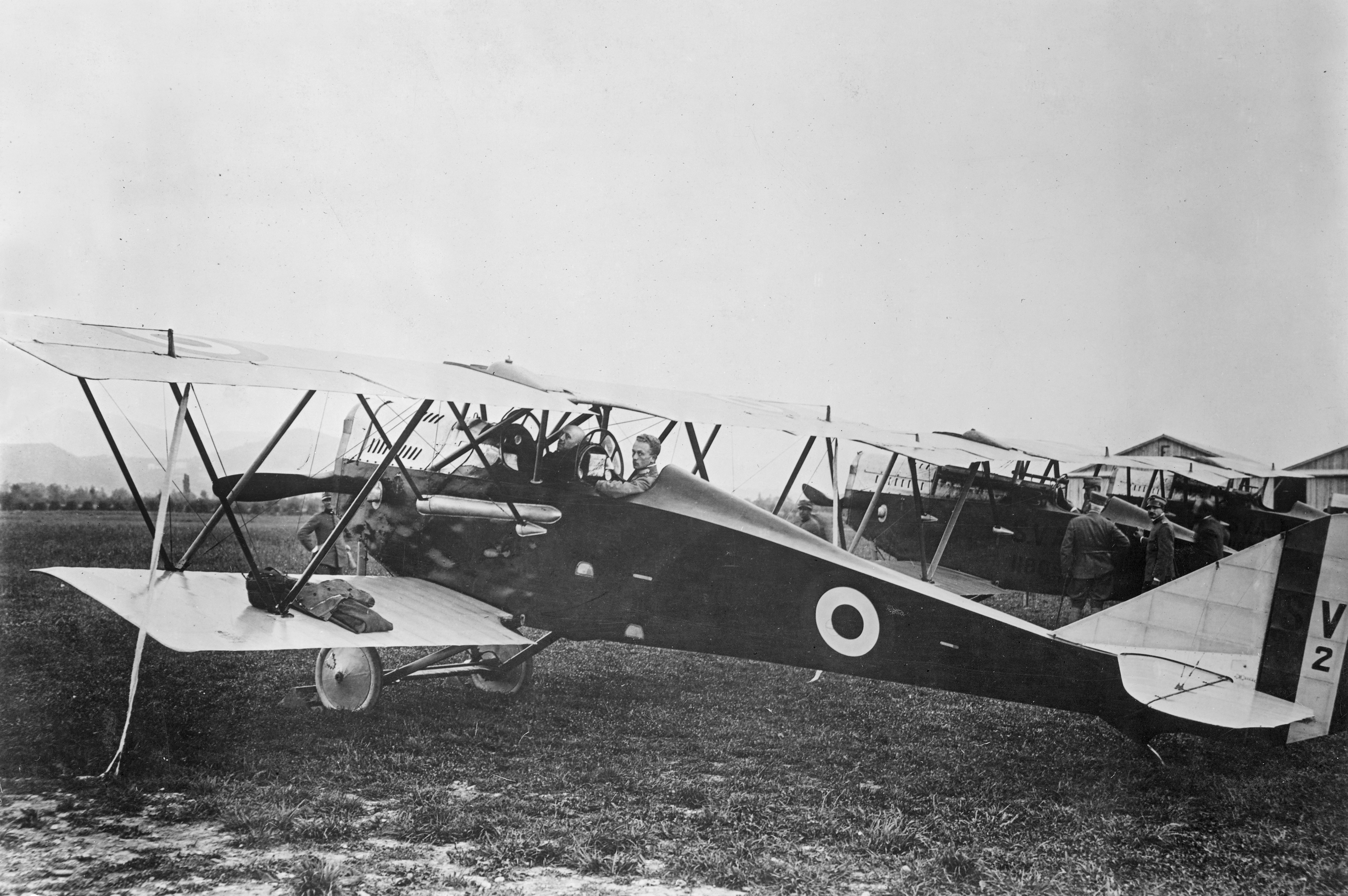
Gabriele D'Annunzio in the front seat of an Ansaldo SVA-9 before the flight.

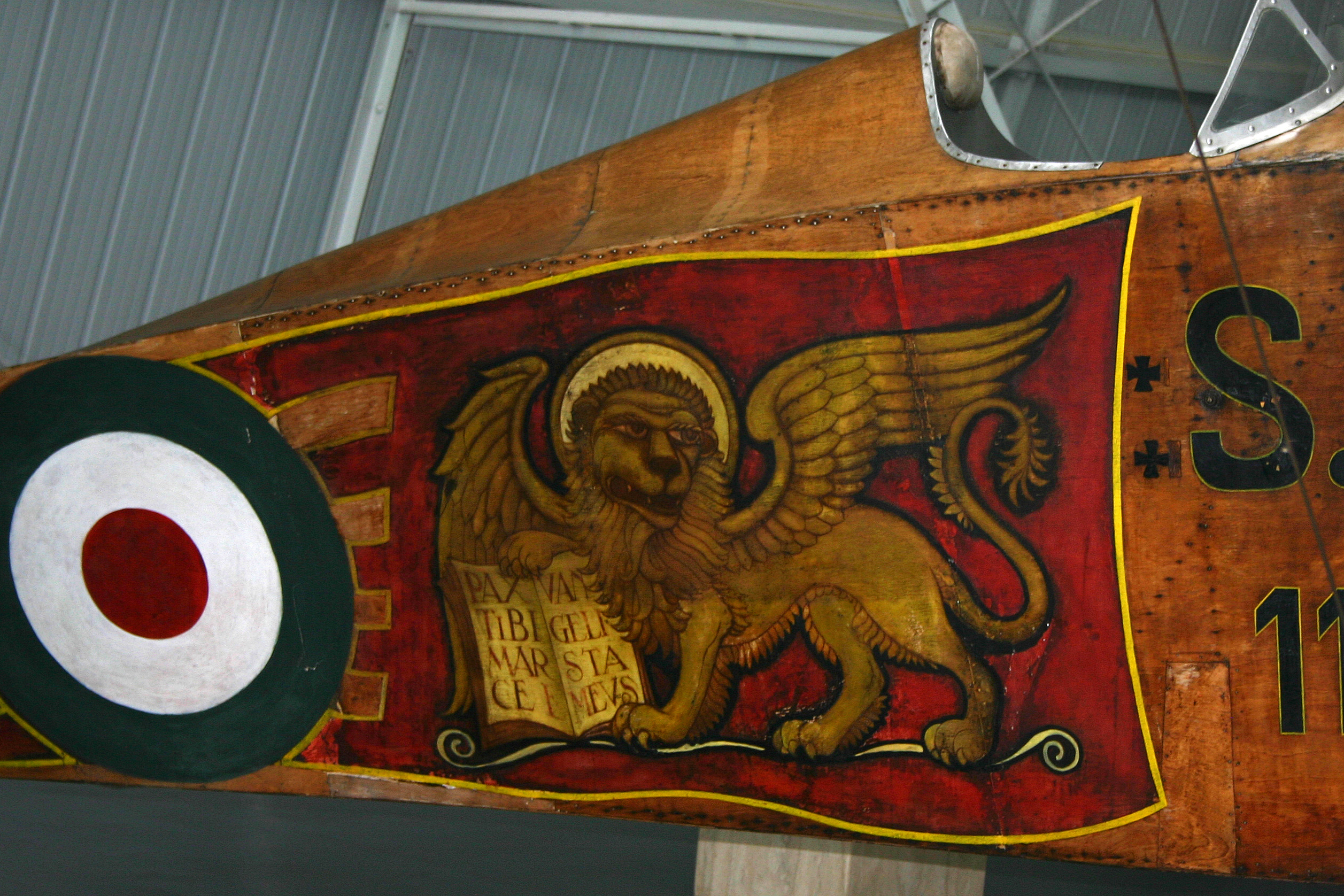
Lion of St. Mark displayed on most of the Ansaldo SVA aircraft on the raid

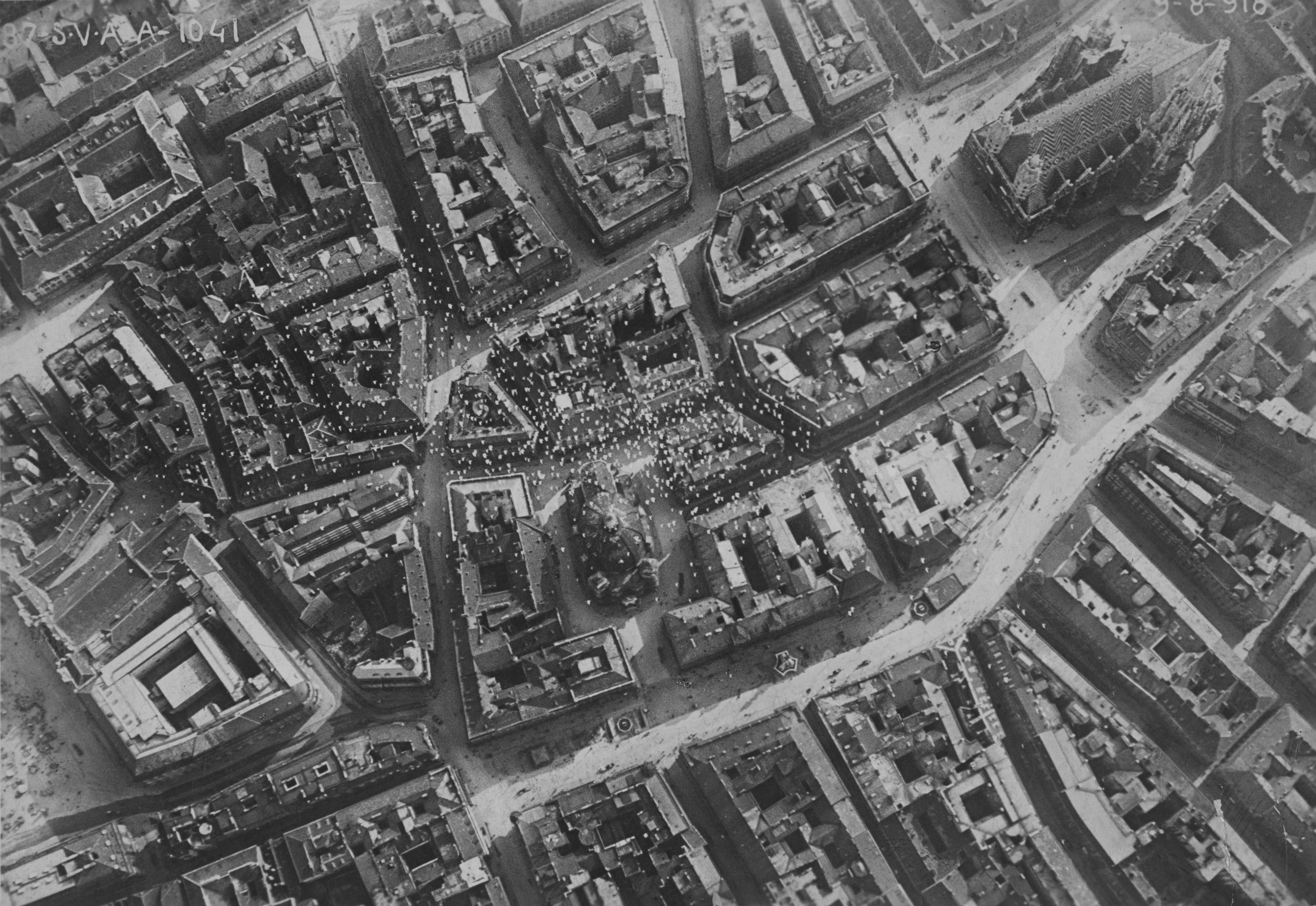
Italian leaflets dropped over the center of Vienna (St. Stephen's Cathedral is visible in the upper right corner with the Graben street below)

The Flight over Vienna was an air raid during World War I undertaken by Italian poet and nationalist Gabriele D'Annunzio on 9 August 1918. With 11 Ansaldo SVA aircraft from his team, the 87ma squadriglia (squadron) called La Serenissima (Venice) all bearing the Lion of St Mark painted on their fuselage sides as the squadron's insignia, he flew for over 1,200 kilometres (750 mi) in a round trip from the squadron's military airfield in Due Carrare to Vienna to drop thousands of propaganda leaflets.

The action was planned the year before but technical problems, such as the fuel capacity of the planes, delayed it.

The first try was attempted on the 2 August 1918, but the aircraft returned due to heavy fog. The second try, on 8 August 1918, was cancelled due to strong wind, while the last one, on 9 August 1918, was successful.

They flew over Vienna and dropped 50,000 leaflets on a three-colored card (green, white, and red: the colors of the Italian flag). The text was written by D'Annunzio himself and was not translated into German. It read:

On this August morning, while the fourth year of your desperate convulsion comes to an end and luminously begins the year of our full power, suddenly there appears the three-color wing as an indication of the destiny that is turning.

Destiny turns. It turns towards us with an iron certainty. The hour of that Germany that thrashes you, and humiliates you, and infects you is now forever passed.

Your hour is passed. As our faith was the strongest, behold how our will prevails and will prevail until the end. The victorious combatants of Piave, the victorious combatants of Marne feel it, they know it, with an ecstasy that multiplies the impetus. But if the impetus were not enough, the number would be; and this is said for those that try fighting ten against one. The Atlantic is a path already closing, and it's a heroic path, as demonstrated by the new chasers who coloured the Ourcq with German blood.

On the wind of victory that rises from freedom's rivers, we didn't come except for the joy of the daring, we didn't come except to prove what we could venture and do whenever we want, in an hour of our choice.

The rumble of the young Italian wing does not sound like the one of the funereal bronze, in the morning sky. Nevertheless the joyful boldness suspends between Saint Stephen and the Graben an irrevocable sentence, o Viennese.

Long live Italy!

Previously, critics of D'Annunzio had said: "He writes but does not act." Because D'Annunzio's Italian text was considered not translatable into German, Ferdinando Martini quipped: "Now he acts but does not write." In reality, they also dropped 350,000 leaflets written by author Ugo Ojetti, which were translated into German:

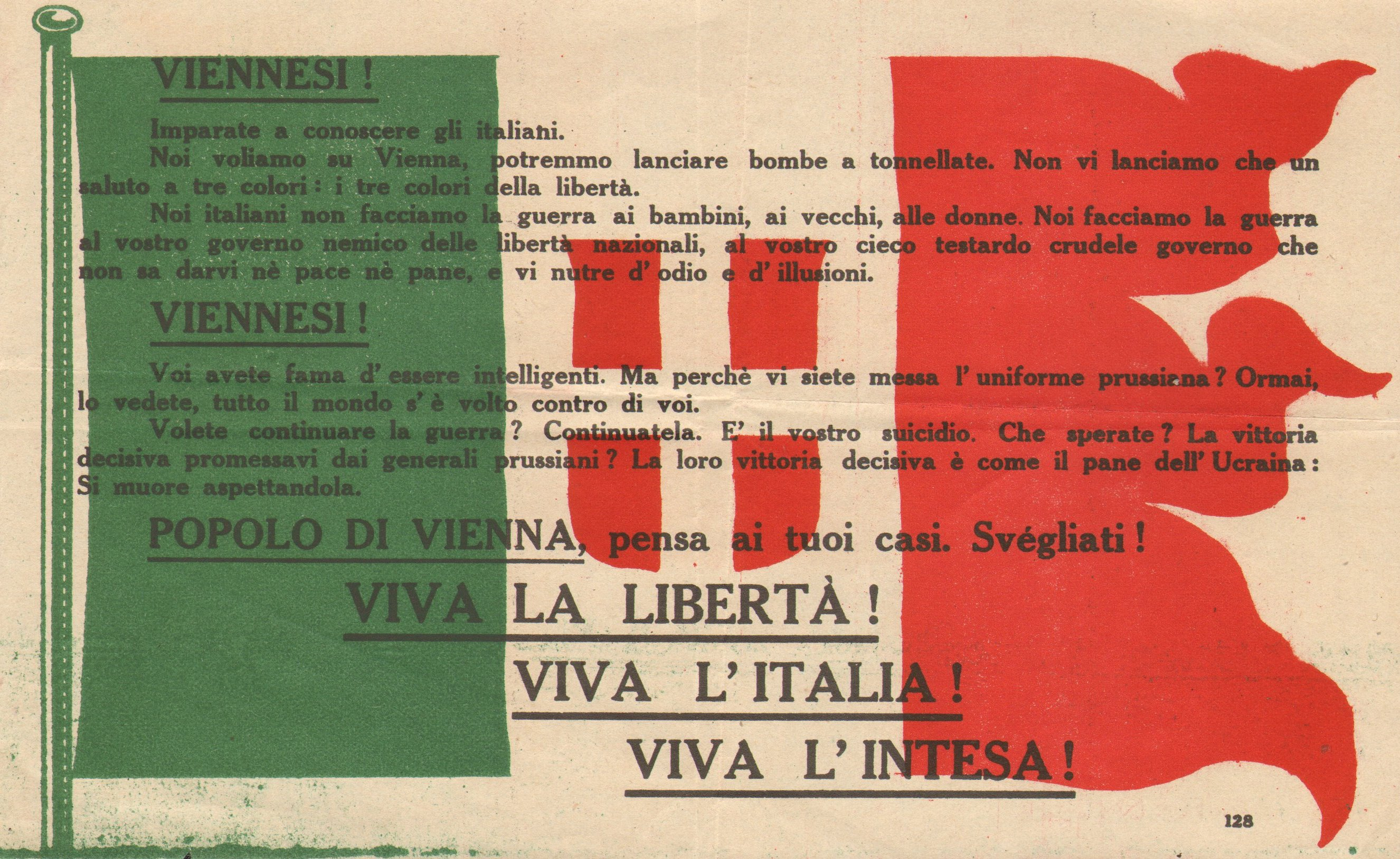

VIENNESE!
Learn to know the Italians.
We are flying over Vienna; we could drop tons of bombs. All we are dropping on you is a greeting of three colors: the three colors of liberty.
We Italians do not make war on children, on old people, on women.
We are making war on your government, the enemy of national liberty, on your blind, stubborn, cruel government that can give you neither peace nor bread, and feeds you hatred and illusions.

VIENNESE!
You are famous for being intelligent. But why have you put on the Prussian uniform? By now, you see, the whole world has turned against you.
You want to continue the war? Continue it; it's your suicide. What do you hope for? The decisive victory promised to you by the Prussian generals? Their decisive victory is like the bread of Ukraine: You die waiting for it.

PEOPLE OF VIENNA, think of your own fates. Wake up!
LONG LIVE LIBERTY!
LONG LIVE ITALY!
LONG LIVE THE ENTENTE!

In 1933, Gauro Ambrosi, who belonged to the Aeropittura movement within futurism, made a painting in celebration of the flight.

== See also ==
- Aircraft of Nuremberg
- Propaganda and censorship in Italy during the First World War
- Rome-Tokyo Raid
