= Isotta Fraschini Asso Caccia =

Asso Caccia
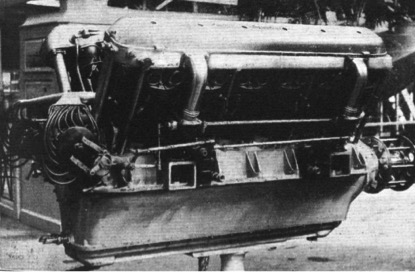
- Side view of an Asso Caccia
- Type: V12 air-cooled aircraft piston engine
- National origin: Italy
- Manufacturer: Isotta Fraschini, Milan
- Major applications: Fiat CR.20

The Isotta Fraschini Asso Caccia, a.k.a. Isotta Fraschini Asso-450 Caccia, was an air-cooled, supercharged V12 piston aero engine produced in the late 1920s and early 1930s by Italian manufacturer Isotta Fraschini.

== Design ==
The Asso Caccia had a V-cylinder configuration, with cylinders made of carbon steel, equipped with cooling fins, mounted separately from each other, to which a single head per cylinder was connected. Above them, two light alloy carters, one per group of cylinders, had the function of connecting the cylinder heads and the intake ducts as well as containing, closed by a cover, the tappets and the distribution members.

The crankshaft, made of special steel, was supported by a series of 8 bearings, with the insertion in the rear position between the last two of a double bearing and thrust ball bearing, which had the task of supporting the effort of the propeller whether it is mounted in a pulling or pushing configuration.

== Applications ==
- Fiat CR.1
- Fiat CR.20

== Specifications ==
Data from Jane's All the World's Aircraft 1928

=== General characteristics ===
- Type: V12 air-cooled 60° direct-drive piston engine
- Bore: 125 mm (4.9 in)
- Stroke: 140 mm (5.5 in)
- Displacement: 20.610 L (1,257.7 cu in)
- Length: 1,646 mm (64.8 in)
- Width: 700 mm (28 in)
- Height: 840 mm (33 in)
- Dry weight: 315 kg (694 lb) dry

=== Components ===
- Valvetrain: 4x overhead valves per cylinder driven by an overhead camshafts and rockers
- Fuel system: 4x Zenith carburetors
- Fuel type: aviation gasoline
- Oil system: pressure
- Cooling system: air
- Reduction gear: direct-drive

=== Performance ===
- Power output:

450 hp (340 kW) (normal) at 2,250 rpm
500 hp (370 kW) (maximum) at 2,600 rpm

- Compression ratio: 5.7:1
- Specific fuel consumption: 0.506 lb/(hp⋅h) (0.308 kg/kWh)

== See also ==
Related lists

- List of aircraft engines
