= M40 =

M40 or M-40 may refer to:

== Transportation ==
- M40 motorway, a motorway in England
- M-40 (Michigan highway), a state highway in Michigan, US
- M40 (Cape Town), a Metropolitan Route in Cape Town, South Africa
- M40 (Johannesburg), a Metropolitan Route in Johannesburg, South Africa
- M40 (Pietermaritzburg), a Metropolitan Route in Pietermaritzburg, South Africa
- Autopista de Circunvalación M-40, a motorway in Madrid, Spain
- BMW M40, a 1987 automobile piston engine
- Charomskiy M-40, an aircraft engine
- Volvo M40 transmission, an automobile transmission
- Chiltern Railways, previously known as M40 Railways
- First Berkshire & The Thames Valley route M40, a bus route from High Wycombe to Uxbridge

== Science ==
- Messier 40 (M40), a double star in the constellation Ursa Major
- the 40th Mersenne prime

== Firearms and military equipment ==
- M40 field protective mask, a United States military gas mask
- M40 rifle, a sniper rifle
- M40 gun motor carriage, a United States self-propelled artillery vehicle
- M40 recoilless rifle, an anti-tank gun
- M/40 automatic cannon, a Swedish heavy machine gun
- Macchi M.40, a prototype 1920s Italian catapult-launched reconnaissance seaplane
- The incorrect designation for the SSh-40, a Russian infantry helmet
- A collector's term for later versions of the M1935 Stahlhelm

== Athletics ==
- M 40, an age group for Masters athletics (athletes aged 35+)

== Technology ==
- Samsung Galaxy M40, a smartphone

== Arts and entertainment ==
- M40, a song by Aitch from the album 4

== See also ==
- 40M (disambiguation)
