= Vickers cal. 7,7 modificata =

Italian aeronautical machine gun

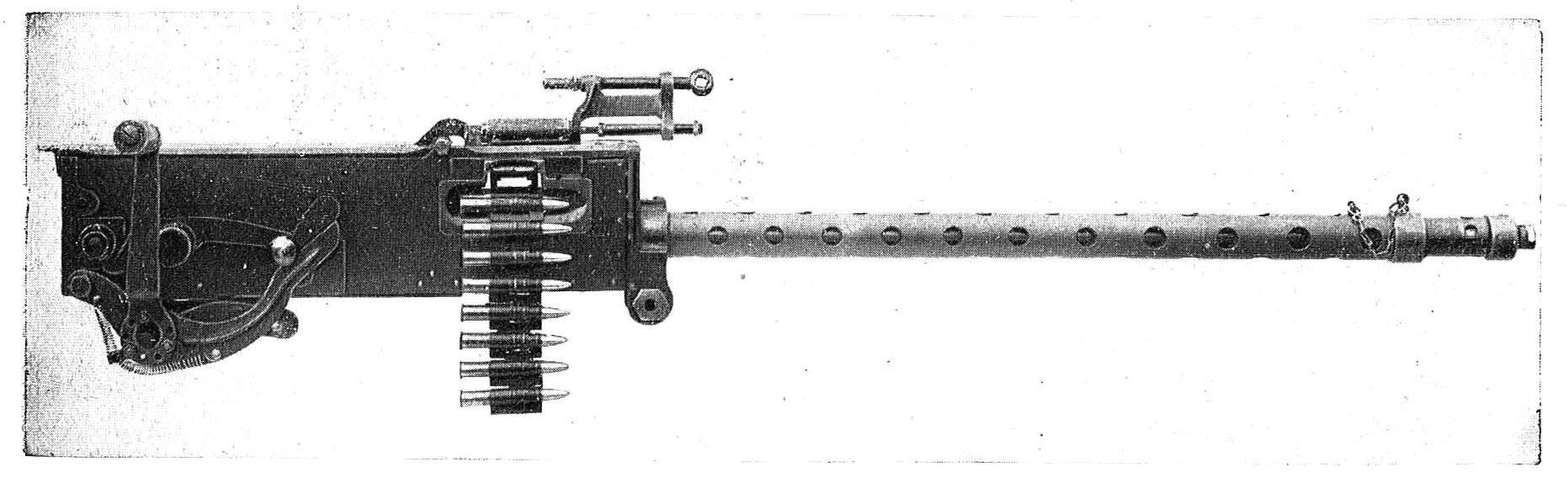
- Vickers cal. 7,7 modificata machine gun.
- Type: Aircraft machine gun
- Place of origin: United Kingdom; Kingdom of Italy

Service history
- In service: 1926-1943
- Used by: Kingdom of Italy

Specifications
- Mass: 12.7 kg (28.00 lb)
- Length: 1,075 mm (42.32 in)
- Cartridge: 7.7x56 mm R
- Action: Short recoil with muzzle booster
- Rate of fire: 750 rounds/min
- Muzzle velocity: 740 m/s (2,430 ft/s)
- Feed system: Metallic belt

The Vickers cal. 7,7 modificata (Modified Vickers caliber 7.7 mm) was an Italian aeronautical machine gun obtained by modifying, hence the name, the original Vickers cal. 7,7 (name used by the Regia Aeronautica to indicate the Vickers MK. I*).

== History ==
With the end of the Great War, the Italian Air Force began a process of standardization and modernization of its armament.

It initially focused on standardization with the rapid retirement of the unsatisfactory 6.5 mm SIA mod.18 Tipo Aviazione and the slower and more progressive withdrawal from service of the Fiat Mod.14 Tipo Aviazione guns, thus achieving general standardization on the 7.7 mm caliber, with the Vickers cal. 7,7 guns used as fixed weapons in fighters and the Lewis cal. 7,7 guns as movable weapons for defensive positions.

Subsequently, it began to devote itself to its modernization with the adoption of new weapons, both through the purchase of foreign weapons (such as the French Darne cal. 7,7), and through the announcement of national competitions (which led to the adoption of the Breda Mod. SAFAT cal. 7,7 in 1933), and through the modernization of weapons retained in service (precisely the Vickers cal. 7,7 modificata).

Research into modifying the Vickers cal. 7,7 began in the first half of the 1920s, leading to the adoption of the new weapon in 1926.

The Vickers cal. 7,7 modificata was the standard weapon of Italian fighters and reconnaissance aircraft, together with the Darne cal. 7,7, from the second half of the 1920s until the adoption of the more modern Breda Mod. SAFAT cal. 7,7 on newly built aircraft in the early 1930s.

== Design ==
The Vickers cal. 7,7 modificata differs from the original Vickers cal. 7,7 (Vickers MK. I*) mainly in:

- its lower weight: 12.7 kg (28.00 lb) for the modified weapon compared to 14.5 kg (31.97 lb) kg for the original weapon.
- its smaller size: 1,075 mm (42.32 in) in length for the modified weapon compared to 1,650 mm (64.96 in) mm for the original weapon.
- its higher rate of fire (achieved thanks to the addition of an accelerator): 750 rounds per minute for the modified weapon compared to 500 rounds per minute for the original weapon.
- a new perforated barrel shroud that is much smaller than the original's large shroud.
- a newly designed muzzle booster.

== Use on aircraft ==
- Ansaldo AC.3 (originally armed with Darne cal. 7,7)
- Ansaldo A.120 Ady
- Cant 25
- Fiat CR.20 (in all its variants)
- Macchi M.40
- Macchi M.41 bis
- Piaggio P.6 ter
- Siai S.58 ter
- Siai S.67

== Bibliography ==
- Ministero dell'Aeronautica (1932). Istruzione sulle mitragliatrici Lewis e Vickers calibro 7,7. Roma.
- Ministero dell'Aeronautica (1931). Manuale dell'armiere-artificiere, parte II e III. Roma.
- Gentilli, Roberto (1982). L'aviazione da caccia italiana 1918-1939, Volume II. Firenze.
- Cappellano, Filippo; Di Martino, Basilio; Marcuzzo, Bruno (2011). Gli artigli delle aquile, l'armamento aereo in Italia durante la Grande Guerra. Roma.
- Farina, Franco (1987a). "Dalle mitragliatrici Revelli ai cannoni Mauser, p.I". Aerofan Magazine (2).
- Farina, Franco (1987b). "Dalle mitragliatrici Revelli ai cannoni Mauser, p.II". Aerofan Magazine (3).
