= SIAI S.51 =

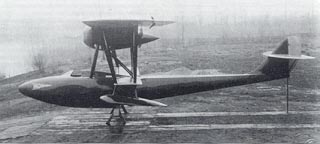

General information
- Type: Racing flying boat
- National origin: Italy
- Manufacturer: SIAI
- Primary user: Italy
- Number built: 1

History
- First flight: 1922

The SIAI S.51, Savoia Marchetti S.51 or Savoia S.51 was an Italian racing flying boat built by SIAI for the 1922 Schneider Trophy race.

== Design and development ==
The S.51 was a single-seat sesquiplane flying boat. It was powered by a single 300 horsepower (220 kW) Hispano-Suiza 8F V8 engine, mounted on two N struts above the hull and below the upper wing, which drove a two-bladed propeller in a pusher configuration. The inclined interplane struts were mounted in a V configuration. The lower wings had small stabilizing floats mounted on inclined struts so that they hung below and outboard of the outer tips of the lower wing.

SIAI later based the design of the hull of its S.58 flying boat fighter of 1924 on that of the S.51's hull.

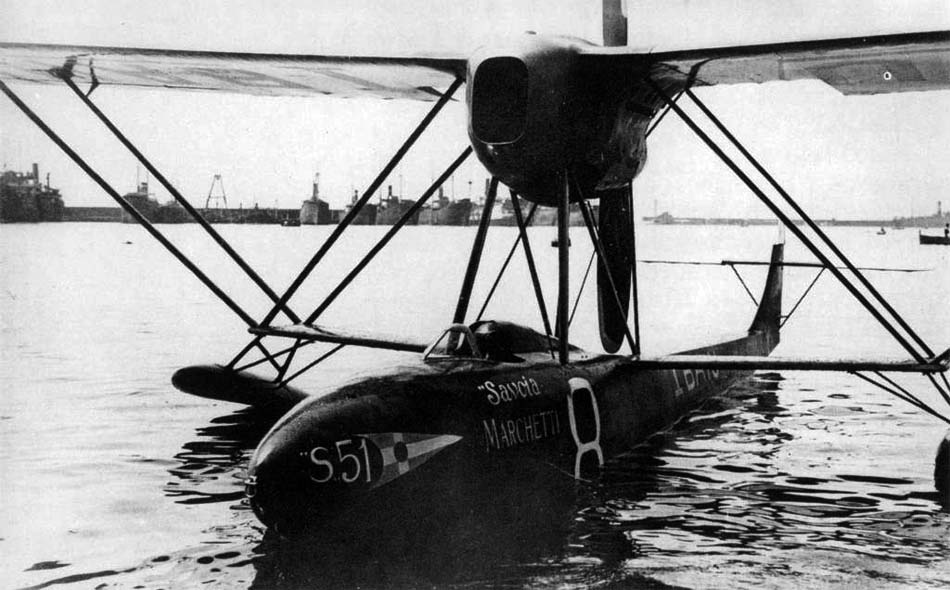

== Operational history ==
Italy entered the S.51 in the 1922 Schneider Trophy race along with two Macchi M.17 flying boats in competition with a British Supermarine Sea Lion II flying boat. The race was held at Naples on 12 August.

The S.51 capsized in an accident during the seaworthiness trials before the race. Righted by its crew, it completed the race, piloted by Alessandro Passaleva but could only take second place, with the Sea Lion a comfortable 2 min 22 s ahead. The course required 13 laps, a total distance of 370 km (230 mi), over which the S.51 averaged 229.57 km/h (142.65 mph).

On 28 December 1922 the S.51, flown again by Passaleva, set a world speed record for seaplanes of 280.155 km/h (174.080 mph).

== Operators ==
Kingdom of Italy

== Specifications ==
General characteristics

- Crew: 1
- Length: 8 m (26 ft 3 in)
- Wingspan: 10 m (32 ft 10 in)
- Height: 2.5 m (8 ft 2 in)
- Wing area: 23 m^{2} (250 sq ft)
- Empty weight: 780 kg (1,720 lb)
- Gross weight: 1,080 kg (2,381 lb)
- Powerplant: 1 × Hispano-Suiza 8F (Type 42) V-8 water-cooled piston engine, 220 kW (300 hp)
- Propellers: 2-bladed

Performance

- Maximum speed: 280 km/h (170 mph, 150 kn)
- Cruise speed: 230 km/h (140 mph, 120 kn)

== See also ==
- Schneider Trophy

Related lists

- List of seaplanes and flying boats
