= Macchi M.40 =

General information
- Type: Reconnaissance floatplane
- National origin: Italy
- Manufacturer: Macchi
- Number built: 2

History
- First flight: 1928

The Macchi M.40 was a prototype 1920s Italian catapult-launched reconnaissance floatplane designed and built by Macchi, it did not enter production.

== Design ==
The M.40 was an all-metal equal-span biplane powered by a 380 hp (280 kW) Fiat A.20 piston engine. It had a large central float with a stabilising float under each wing. The crew sat in tandem open cockpits and the M.40 was armed with one fixed and one movable 7.7 mm (0.303 in) machine-gun. Two were built, given the serials MM.88 and MM.89, but following testing, the aircraft was not put into production.

== Specifications ==
Data from Illustrated Encyclopedia of Aircraft

General characteristics

- Crew: two (pilot, observer/gunner)
- Powerplant: 1 × Fiat A.20 , 283 kW (380 hp)

Performance

- Maximum speed: 166 km/h (103 mph, 90 kn)

Armament

- 1 fixed 7.7mm (0.303in) Vickers modificata machine gun
- 1 movable 7.7mm (0.303in) Lewis machine gun

== See also ==
Related lists

- List of flying boats and floatplanes
