= Macchi M.26 =

Italian flying boat prototype

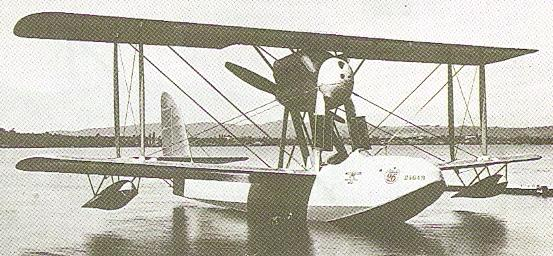

General information
- Type: Flying boat fighter
- National origin: Italy
- Manufacturer: Macchi
- Designer: Mario Castoldi (1888-1968)
- Primary user: Italy
- Number built: 2

History
- First flight: 1924

The Macchi M.26 was an Italian flying boat fighter prototype of 1924 designed and manufactured by Macchi.

== Design and development ==
In 1924, the Regia Marina (Italian Royal Navy) issued a requirement for a replacement for its Macchi M.7ter flying boat fighter. To compete with the SIAI S.58 for a production order as the replacement, Macchi company designer Mario Castoldi (1888–1968) developed the M.26. It was a wooden, single-seat, single-bay biplane armed with two fixed, forward-firing 7.7-millimeter (0.303-inch) Vickers machine guns. It had plywood and fabric skinning, and its wings were of equal span and unstaggered. The M.26's engine, a 221-kilowatt (296-brake horsepower) Hispano-Suiza HS 42 V8 driving a pusher propeller, was mounted on struts above the hull and below the upper wing. For an aircraft of its type, its aerodynamic design was very clean.

The M.26 was completed in 1924 and made its first flight that year, demonstrating good performance. Macchi built two prototypes, but the Regia Marina opted to save money by re-engining the Macchi M.7ter to extend its service life rather than purchase a new aircraft, and Macchi received no production orders for the M.26. However, a few years later Macchi based the design of its M.41 fighter on that of the M.26.

== Operators ==
Kingdom of Italy

- Regia Aeronautica

== Specifications ==
Data from Green, William, and Gordon Swanborough The Complete Book of Fighters: An Illustrated Encyclopedia of Every Fighter Aircraft Built and Flown, New York: SMITHMARK Publishers, 1994, ISBN 0-8317-3939-8

General characteristics

- Crew: one
- Length: 8.15 m (26 ft 8.88 in)
- Wingspan: 9.20 m (30 ft 2.25 in)
- Height: 3.00 m (9 ft 10 in)
- Wing area: 26.00 m^{2} (279.87 sq ft)
- Empty weight: 865 kg (1,907 lb)
- Gross weight: 1,195 kg (2,634 lb)
- Powerplant: 1 × Hispano-Suiza HS 42 V8 piston , 221 kW (296 hp)

Performance

- Maximum speed: 244 km/h (152 mph, 132 kn)
- Endurance: 2 hours 30 minutes

Armament

- 2 × fixed forward-firing 7.7-millimeter (0.303-inch) Vickers machine guns

Notes:

- Time to 4,000 m (13,123 ft): 12 min 18 sec

== See also ==
- Alenia Aermacchi
- Macchi M.41

Aircraft of comparable role, configuration, and era

- SIAI S.58

Related lists

- List of seaplanes and flying boats
