= SIAI S.67 =

Italian flying boat fighter

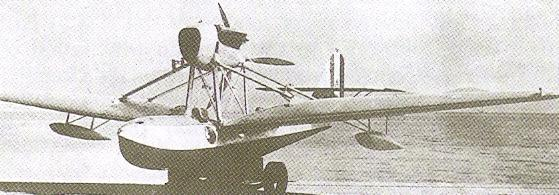

General information
- Type: Flying boat fighter
- National origin: Italy
- Manufacturer: SIAI
- Primary user: Regia Marina (Italian Royal Navy)
- Number built: 3

History
- First flight: 28 January 1930
- Retired: 1935

The SIAI S.67 or Savoia Marchetti SM.67 was an Italian flying boat fighter of the early 1930s designed and manufactured by SIAI.

== Design and development ==
In 1929, the Regia Marina (Italian Royal Navy) awarded a contract to SIAI to produce the prototype of a new flying boat fighter for use as a catapult-launched aircraft aboard Condottieri-class cruisers. In response, SIAI designed the S.67, a wooden, single-seat, monoplane flying boat powered by a 313-kilowatt (420-horsepower) Fiat A.20 V12 liquid-cooled engine driving a three-bladed pusher propeller. The wing spars were attached to the fuselage, and the engine was mounted on steel tube struts above the hull, each attached to the engine mount by one pin. The S.67's armament consisted of two fixed, forward-firing 7.7-millimeter (0.303-inch) Vickers modificate machine guns mounted in the bow. The S.67's design allowed a team of six men aboard a cruiser to erect it on its catapult and have it ready for launch within five minutes.

== Operational history ==
The S.67 made its first flight on 28 January 1930. Il Centro Sperimentali (The Experimental Center) began testing of the prototype in early March 1930, during which it crashed on 3 April 1930.

Despite this unfortunate end to the testing program, SIAI received a production order for three more aircraft. One of these was cancelled, but the other two entered service with the 162ª Squadriglia (162nd Squadron) of the 88° Gruppo Caccia Marittima (88th Maritime Fighter Group). They were retired in 1935.

== Operators ==
Kingdom of Italy
Regia Marina (Italian Royal Navy)

162ª Squadriglia, 88° Gruppo Caccia Marittima

== Specifications ==
Data from Green, William, and Gordon Swanborough The Complete Book of Fighters: An Illustrated Encyclopedia of Every Fighter Aircraft Built and Flown, New York: SMITHMARK Publishers, 1994, ISBN 0-8317-3939-8

General characteristics

- Crew: 1
- Length: 8.97 m (29 ft 5.13 in)
- Wingspan: 13.10 m (42 ft 11.75 in)
- Height: 2.90 m (9 ft 6.13 in)
- Wing area: 27.20 m^{2} (292.79 sq ft)
- Empty weight: 1,209 kg (2,665 lb)
- Gross weight: 1,639 kg (3,613 lb)
- Powerplant: 1 × Fiat A.20 V12 liquid-cooled piston , 313 kW (420 hp)

Performance

- Maximum speed: 258 km/h (160 mph, 140 kn)
- Endurance: 3 hours 42 minutes

Armament

- 2 × fixed forward-firing 7.7-millimeter (0.303-inch) Vickers modificate machine guns.

Notes:

- Time to 3,000 m (9,842 ft): 9.78 min

== See also ==
- Savoia-Marchetti
- Condottieri class cruiser

Related lists

- List of Interwar military aircraft
- List of seaplanes and flying boats
