= Macchi M.71 =

Italian flying boat fighter

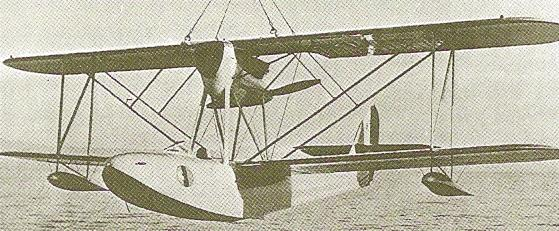

General information
- Type: Flying boat fighter
- National origin: Italy
- Manufacturer: Macchi
- Primary user: Regia Marina (Italian Royal Navy)
- Number built: No more than 12

History
- First flight: 1930
- Variant: Macchi M.41bis

The Macchi M.71 was an Italian flying boat fighter of the 1930s designed and manufactured by Macchi.

== Design and development ==
In 1930, Macchi built a new version of its M.41bis flying boat fighter designed for launching by catapult from warships of the Regia Marina (Italian Royal Navy). The new aircraft, the M.71, built to the same dimensions as the M.41bis and aerodynamically very clean for an aircraft of its type, was identical to the M.41bis in most ways, being a wooden, single-seat, single-bay biplane armed with two fixed, forward-firing 7.7 mm (0.303 in) machine guns, plywood and fabric skinning, unstaggered wings of equal span, a 313 kW (420 hp) Fiat A.20 engine driving a pusher propeller mounted on struts above the hull and below the upper wing, and fitted with a vertical radiator.

The M.71 differed from the M.41bis in having a stronger wing cellule and catapult pick-up points and, to facilitate rapid assembly and disassambly during shipboard operations, it had inclined steel tube struts between the hull, interplane struts, and upper wing section instead of the M.41bis's bracing wires.

== Operational history ==
The Regia Marina accepted the M.71 for service, and Macchi built a small number of them, probably no more than twelve. They briefly saw service aboard Regia Marina warships during the 1930s until the IMAM Ro.43 reconnaissance floatplane and IMAM Ro.44 floatplane fighter replaced them.

== Operators ==
Kingdom of Italy

- Regia Marina

== Specifications ==
Data from Italian Civil & Military Aircraft 1930-1945 and The Complete Book of Fighters

General characteristics

- Crew: 1
- Length: 8.66 m (28 ft 5 in)
- Wingspan: 11.12 m (36 ft 6 in)
- Height: 3.12 m (10 ft 3 in)
- Wing area: 31.901 m^{2} (343.38 sq ft)
- Empty weight: 1,260 kg (2,778 lb)
- Gross weight: 1,690 kg (3,726 lb)
- Powerplant: 1 × Fiat A.20 V-12 liquid-cooled piston engine, 313 kW (420 hp)

Performance

- Maximum speed: 256 km/h (159 mph, 138 kn)
- Stall speed: 80 km/h (50 mph, 43 kn)
- Range: 700 km (435 mi, 378 nmi)
- Service ceiling: 6,000 m (19,680 ft)
- Rate of climb: 5.9 m/s (1,160 ft/min)
- Time to altitude:
- 5 min 39s to 2,000 m (6,562 ft)
- 9 min 34s to 3,000 m (9,843 ft)
- 14 min 8s to 4,000 m (13,123 ft)
- 20 min 25s to 5,000 m (16,404 ft)

Armament

- Guns: 2 × fixed forward-firing 7.7 mm (0.303 in) machine guns

== See also ==
Aircraft of comparable role, configuration, and era

- Macchi M.41bis

Related lists

- List of Interwar military aircraft
- List of seaplanes and flying boats
