= Fiat CR.20 =

Fighter aircraft family

CR.20
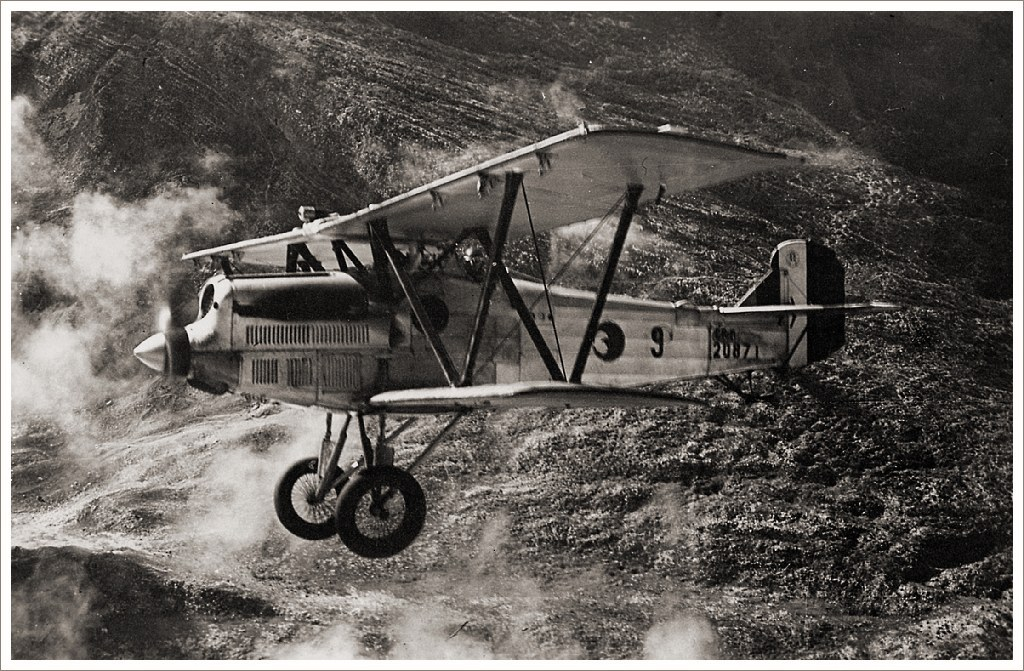

General information
- Type: Fighter
- Manufacturer: Fiat
- Designer: Celestino Rosatelli
- Primary users: Regia Aeronautica Lithuanian Air Force; Hungarian Air Force
- Number built: c. 250 CR.20 c. 46 CR.20 Idro c. 235 CR.20bis c. 204 CR.20 Asso

History
- First flight: 19 June 1926

The Fiat CR.20 was a biplane fighter designed and produced by the Italian aircraft manufacturer Fiat. It represented an intermediate step from the early biplane CR.1 and the later, successful series CR.30, CR.32 and CR.42.

Development of the CR.20 was headed by the aeronautical engineer Celestino Rosatelli, who selected a sesquiplane configuration. The engine was a water-cooled 306 kW (410 hp) Fiat A.20 V-12 engine. Major variants were the CR.20 Idro, a pontoon floatplane, and the CR.20 Asso, using a more powerful (336 kW/450 hp) Isotta Fraschini engine. CR.20bis, produced from 1930, differed from the original version only with the addition of a more advanced landing gear.

== Design and development ==
The Fiat CR.20 was a sesquiplane fighter. It had an all-metal framework which comprised both steel and various light metals. The exterior covering was of fireproof fabric, except for the front part of the fuselage close to the engine, which was instead covered by duralumin sheeting. The fuselage was relatively streamlined, which was obtained via the use of duralumin ribs and tubes that directly supported the fabric covering. The pilot was seated relatively high up in relation to the top of the fuselage; this provided a good field of vision both above and below the upper wing. Overall, the aircraft was relatively compact, which had the benefit of minimising inertia in all directions and thus improving its manoeuvrability.

The wings were staggered, and had dihedral. The number of wing struts, arranged as a warren girder was minimised as to reduce the drag incurred as well as to simplify the mounting. The ribs employed an arrangement of triangular bracing composed of thin duralumin tubes while the wing spars formed box girders, consisting of two metal strips that were riveted together. Shearing stresses were adequately distributed by the twin spar webs, the flanges of which extended along the entire length of the spars and were reinforced at certain points. The stress distribution was designed to require the least possible variation in the cross section of the spars to form a girder of near uniform strength. The wing struts were composed of sheet metal in a conventional manner and possessed an aspect ratio of 2.5, as was then typically used on Fiat-built aircraft. The three struts forming each half of the cabane were joined in a manner that imposed no obstruction to the aircraft's cockpit.

The fuselage framework consisted of four steel longerons, which were connected by a combination of transverse frames and triangular bracing. The structure of the fuselage's forward section terminated at the second bulkhead, that beyond effectively being a projecting bracket. The mounting for the engine was relatively simple; however, attention was paid to providing good accessibility for various elements, including the magnetos, water, fuel, and oil pumps and most aspects of the power plant. No bracing was present between the lower longerons due to the location of the fuel tank; instead, the horizontal girders continued through to the lower wing to join with the fuselage. The honeycomb radiator, which was located within the forward fuselage, used specialised elastic supports that avoided any vibration-related disturbances. The air passages of the radiator were arranged to facilitate maximum airflow, and thus the most efficient cooling, while the aircraft was climbing. The pilot could exercise control of the radiator via a shutter.

It was powered by a Fiat A.20 V-12 water-cooled piston engine, which was capable of producing 410 hp, driving a twin-bladed fixed-pitch propeller . The speed of the engine enabled the attainment of a high specific power despite a relatively small bulk. The front end of the engine was specifically shaped to facilitate the installation of the radiator and thus achieve optimal efficacy, weight, and bulk, as well as protection of vulnerable elements from enemy fire. The twin double-spark high-tension magnetos were located aft of the engine and were relatively easily to inspect. A specialised starter, assisted by starting magnetos, was also present.

The armament of the prototype consisted of four machine guns, all located within the fuselage. Two Vickers cal. 7,7 modificate fired through the propeller arc as they were situated quite close to the pilot and featured an orthodox installation. The other two Darne cal. 7,7 were mounted on the either side of the fuselage at the height of the longeron that supported the engine. The ammunition boxes, which were located on the sides of, and underneath, the engine cowling, were suitably protected. The aircraft had a relatively large carrying capacity. On the production variants the armament was reduced to only two Vickers cal. 7,7 modificate.

Considerable attention was paid to maximising the safety of the aircraft, to avoid needing high piloting skills to operate it. To minimise the risk of an onboard fire, the pilot could jettison the fuel tank. . Torque was corrected against by making the left half-cell somewhat longer than the right. . Special attention was paid to the positioning of both the fuel and oil tanks relative to the aircraft's centre of gravity, as well as to the location of the landing gear (in order to lessen the tendency to capsize on rough ground). The angle of attack was such as to achieve maximum lift and therefore to minimise the aircraft's landing speed. Despite these measures, the CR.20 was capable of performing various aerobatic manoeuvres and also possessed relatively high horizontal and climbing speeds.

== Operational history ==
During September 1926, official testing of the CR.20 was performed at Montecelio; various aspects of the aircraft, including its manoeuvrability, ease of operation, responsive controls, and perfect equilibrium in flight, were commonly identified by early pilots.

By 1933, the CR.20 had reached its operational peak, equipping 27 squadrons of the Italian Regia Aeronautica. The aircraft engaged in combat against Libyan rebels as well as during the early stages of the Second Italo-Abyssinian War in the attack role. The CR.20s remained in service with the Regia Aeronautica in the aerobatics and training through much of the 1930s.

In 1933, Italy sold five CR.20s to Paraguay, which was fighting the Chaco War against Bolivia. Thus, these aircraft served as Paraguay's only fighters through to the end of the conflict.

== Variants ==
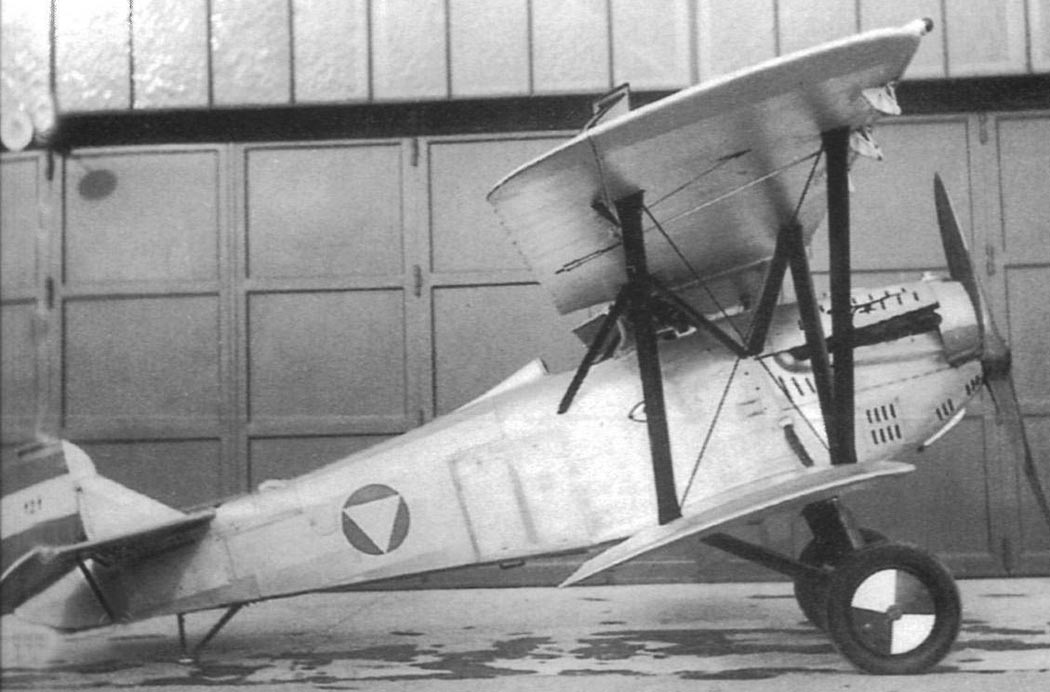
Austrian CR.20bis

- CR.20 Idro : Twin-float seaplane version.
- CR.20bis : Single-seat fighter biplane, fitted with an advanced landing gear.
- CR.20bisAQ/CR.20AQ : CR.20bis aircraft fitted with the Fiat A.20 A.Q. piston-engine.
- CR.20 Asso : Single-seat fighter biplane, powered by a 336 kW (450 hp) Isotta Fraschini Asso Caccia engine.
- CR.20B : Two-seat trainer, communications aircraft. Built in small numbers.

== Operators ==
Austria

- Austrian Air Force (1931-1938)

Hungary

- Hungarian Air Force

Kingdom of Italy

- Regia Aeronautica
- Aviazione Legionaria

Lithuania

- Lithuanian Air Force - 15 units, (operated subsequently by 1st, 5th and 7th Sqn., 1928-1940)

Paraguay

- Paraguayan Air Arm

Poland

- Polish Air Force

Spain

- Spanish Air Force

Soviet Union

- Soviet Air Force - Two aircraft, used for tests and trials.

== Specifications (CR.20) ==
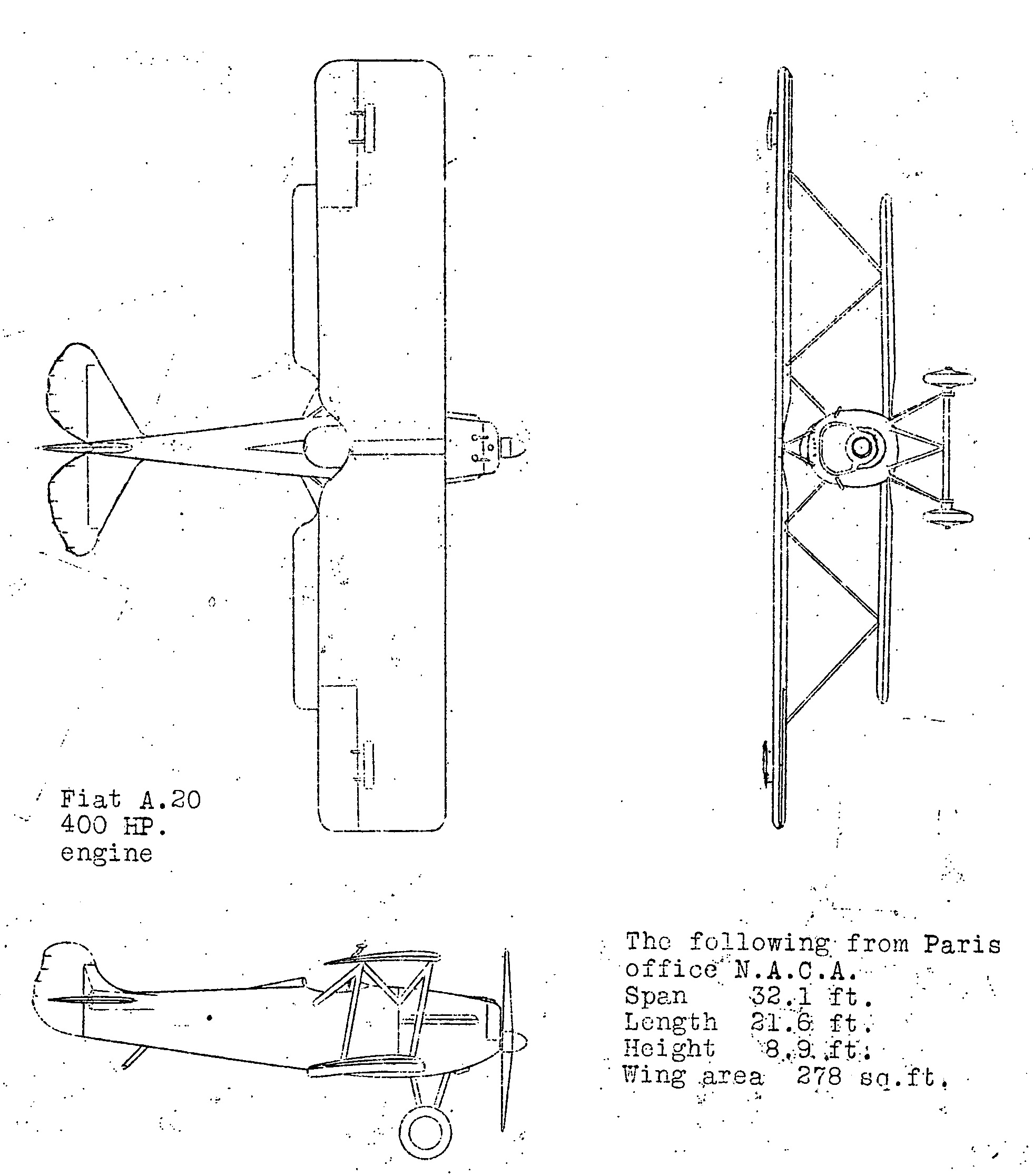
Fiat CR.20 3-view drawing from NACA Aircraft Circular No.43

Data from The Complete Book of Fighters, National Advisory Committee for Aeronautics

General characteristics

- Crew: 1
- Length: 6.7 m (22 ft 0 in)
- Wingspan: 9.8 m (32 ft 2 in)
- Height: 2.75 m (9 ft 0 in)
- Wing area: 25.65 m^{2} (276.1 sq ft)
- Empty weight: 980 kg (2,161 lb)
- Gross weight: 1,400 kg (3,086 lb)
- Powerplant: 1 × Fiat A.20 V-12 water-cooled piston engine, 331 kW (444 hp)
- Propellers: 2-bladed fixed-pitch propeller

Performance

- Maximum speed: 270 km/h (170 mph, 150 kn)
- Range: 750 km (470 mi, 400 nmi)
- Endurance: 3 hours
- Service ceiling: 7,500 m (24,600 ft)
- Time to altitude: 5,400 m (17,700 ft) in 13 minutes and 37 seconds

Armament

- Guns: 2 × 7.7 mm (.303 in) Vickers modificate machine guns

== See also ==
Related development

- Fiat CR.1
- Fiat CR.30

Aircraft of comparable role, configuration, and era

- Blériot-SPAD S.91
- Curtiss P-6 Hawk
- Gloster Gamecock

Related lists

- List of Interwar military aircraft

== Bibliography ==
- Angelucci, Enzo. The Rand McNally Encyclopedia of Military Aircraft, 1914-1980. San Diego, US: The Military Press, 1983. ISBN 0-517-41021-4.
- Green, William and Gordon Swanborough. The Complete Book of Fighters. New York, US:Smithmark, 1994. ISBN 0-8317-3939-8.
- von Rauch, Gerd. "The Green Hell Air War". Air Enthusiast Quarterly, Number Two, 1976, pp. 207–213. Bromley, UK:Pilot Press.
- Sapienza, Antonio Luis (September 1994). "Les chasseurs Fiat au Paraguay" [Paraguayan Fiat Fighters]. Avions: Toute l'aéronautique et son histoire (in French) (19): 9–13. ISSN 1243-8650.
- Taylor, Michael J.H. Warplanes of the World 1918-1939. London: Ian Allan, 1981. ISBN 0-7110-1078-1.
- "Fiat C.R. 20 pursuit airplane" National Advisory Committee for Aeronautics, 1 May 1927. NACA-AC-43, 93R19910.
- Ministero dell'Aeronautica (1928). Apparecchio C.R. 20 - Istruzioni per il montaggio e la regolazione. Roma.
- Gentilli, Roberto (1982). L'aviazione da caccia italiana 1918-1939, Volume II. Firenze.
