= Macchi M.41 =

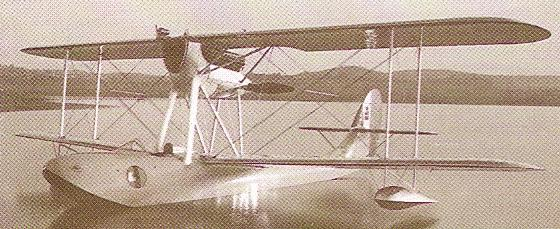
- The M.41bis, the production model of the Macchi M.41.

General information
- Type: Flying boat fighter
- National origin: Italy
- Manufacturer: Macchi
- Primary user: Regia Marina (Italian Royal Navy)
- Number built: M.41: 1 M.41bis: 41

History
- Introduction date: 1930
- First flight: M.41: 1927; M.41bis: 1929
- Retired: 1938
- Variant: Macchi M.71

The Macchi M.41 was an Italian flying boat fighter prototype of 1927 designed and manufactured by Macchi. Its production model, the M.41bis, first flown in 1929, was in front line service from 1930 to 1938.

== Design and development ==
=== M.41 ===
In 1927, the Regia Marina (Italian Royal Navy) held a contest for a replacement for the Macchi M.7ter flying boat fighter. In response, Macchi designed the M.41, based on its Macchi M.26 design of 1924. The M.41 was a wooden, single-seat, single-bay biplane armed with two fixed, forward-firing 7.7-millimeter (0.303-inch) machine guns. It had plywood and fabric skinning, and its wings were of equal span and unstaggered. Its engine, a 313-kilowatt (420-horsepower) Fiat A.20 driving a pusher propeller, was mounted on struts above the hull and below the upper wing, and the aircraft was fitted with an oblique frontal radiator. Like the M.26, it was of very clean aerodynamic design for an aircraft of its type.

In the 1927 contest, the M.41 prototype competed against the SIAI S.58bis. Macchi received no production order for the M.41 and built only the first prototype. Although plans were made for SIAI to produce 97 S.58bis aircraft, these fell through when the Regia Marina decided to save money by re-engining the M.7ter rather than procure any new replacement aircraft in 1927.

=== M.41 bis ===
In 1929, the Regia Marina again organized a contest for an M.7 ter replacement. Macchi produced a new version of the M.41, dubbed the M.41 bis, which differed from the M.41 chiefly in having a vertical radiator. It performed better than the SIAI S.58ter in the contest, and this time Macchi was awarded a contract to produce 41 M.41 bis aircraft.

== Operational history ==
Macchi delivered all 41 M.41 bis aircraft, which began to enter service in 1930. They operated in two squadriglie of the 88° Gruppo Autonomo Caccia Marittima, and remained in front-line service until replaced in 1938 by the IMAM Ro.44 floatplane fighter.

== Operators ==
Kingdom of Italy

- Regia Marina
  - 88° Gruppo Autonomo Caccia Marittima

Spain

- Spanish Air Force

== Specifications (M.41bis) ==
Data from The Complete Book of Fighters: An Illustrated Encyclopedia of Every Fighter Aircraft Built and Flown, Velivoli Macchi dal 1912 al 1963, The Rand McNally encyclopedia of military aircraft 1914 - 1980, Jane's all the World's Aircraft 1928

General characteristics

- Crew: 1
- Length: 8.66 m (28 ft 5 in)
- Wingspan: 11.12 m (36 ft 6 in)
- Height: 3.12 m (10 ft 3 in)
- Wing area: 31.9 m^{2} (343 sq ft)
- Empty weight: 1,170 kg (2,579 lb)
- Gross weight: 1,600 kg (3,527 lb)
- Powerplant: 1 × Fiat A.20 V-12 water-cooled piston engine, 310 kW (420 hp)
- Propellers: 2-bladed fixed pitch pusher propeller

Performance

- Maximum speed: 262 km/h (163 mph, 141 kn)
- Stall speed: 81 km/h (50 mph, 44 kn)
- Range: 700 km (430 mi, 380 nmi)
- Endurance: 3.5 hours
- Service ceiling: 7,500 m (24,600 ft)
- Time to altitude: 1,000 m (3,300 ft) in 2 minutes
- Wing loading: 48 kg/m^{2} (9.8 lb/sq ft)
- Power/mass: 0.196 kW/kg (0.119 hp/lb)

Armament

- Guns: 2 × fixed forward-firing 7.7 mm (0.30 in) Vickers cal. 7,7 modificate machine guns.

== See also ==
- Macchi M.26

Aircraft of comparable role, configuration, and era

- SIAI S.58

Related lists

- List of Interwar military aircraft
- List of seaplanes and flying boats
