= Piaggio P.6 =

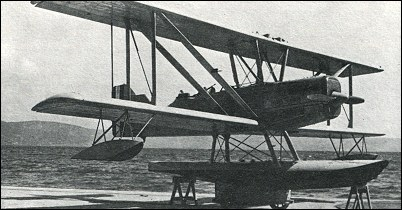

General information
- Type: Catapult-launched reconnaissance floatplane
- Manufacturer: Piaggio
- Primary user: Regia Marina
- Number built: 15 (P.6ter)

History
- First flight: 1927

The Piaggio P.6 was an Italian catapult-launched reconnaissance floatplane designed and built by Piaggio for the Regia Marina (Italian Royal Navy).

== Development ==
To meet a Regia Marina requirement for a two-seat catapult-launched seaplane, Piaggio produced two designs. The first, designated the P.6bis, was a small biplane flying boat powered by a 190 kW (260 hp) Isotta Fraschini V.6 engine (replaced later by a Isotta-Fraschini Asso 200) driving a pusher propeller. The second design designated, the P.6, was a floatplane with one large central float and two stabilising floats at the wingtips and a nose-mounted A.20 engine.

Both aircraft had the same biplane wing structure with rigid strut bracing and both were armed with a single machine gun (the flying-boat's in the bow and the floatplane's in the rear cockpit). In 1928, the P.6ter was produced based on the P.6 floatplane with the engine boosted to 306 kW (410 hp). A production run of 15 P-6ter aircraft was produced for the Italian Navy where it had an unremarkable career, being used on battleships and cruisers.

== Variants ==
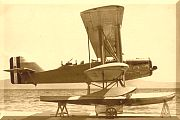

P.6bis
Prototype flying boat.
P.6
Prototype floatplane.
P.6ter
Production floatplane, 15 built.

== Operators ==
Kingdom of Italy

- Regia Marina

== Specifications (P.6ter) ==
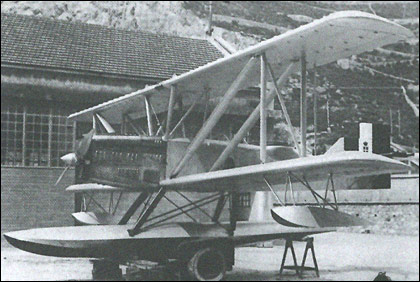

General characteristics

- Crew: two
- Wingspan: 13.54 m (44 ft 3.5 in)
- Gross weight: 2,516 kg (5,203 lb)
- Powerplant: 1 × Fiat A.20 , 306 kW (410 hp)

Performance

- Maximum speed: 195 km/h (121 mph, 105 kn)

Armament

- Guns: *1 × fixed forward firing 7.7 mm (0.303) Vickers modificata machine gun
- 1 x movable 7.7mm (0.303in) Lewis machine gun
- Bombs: 6 x 15 kg bombs

== See also ==
Related lists

- List of Interwar military aircraft
- List of seaplanes and flying boats
