= No. 7 Squadron (Lithuanian Air Force) =

7th Squadron of the Lithuanian Military Aviation
- Lietuvos karo aviacijos 7-oji eskadrilė
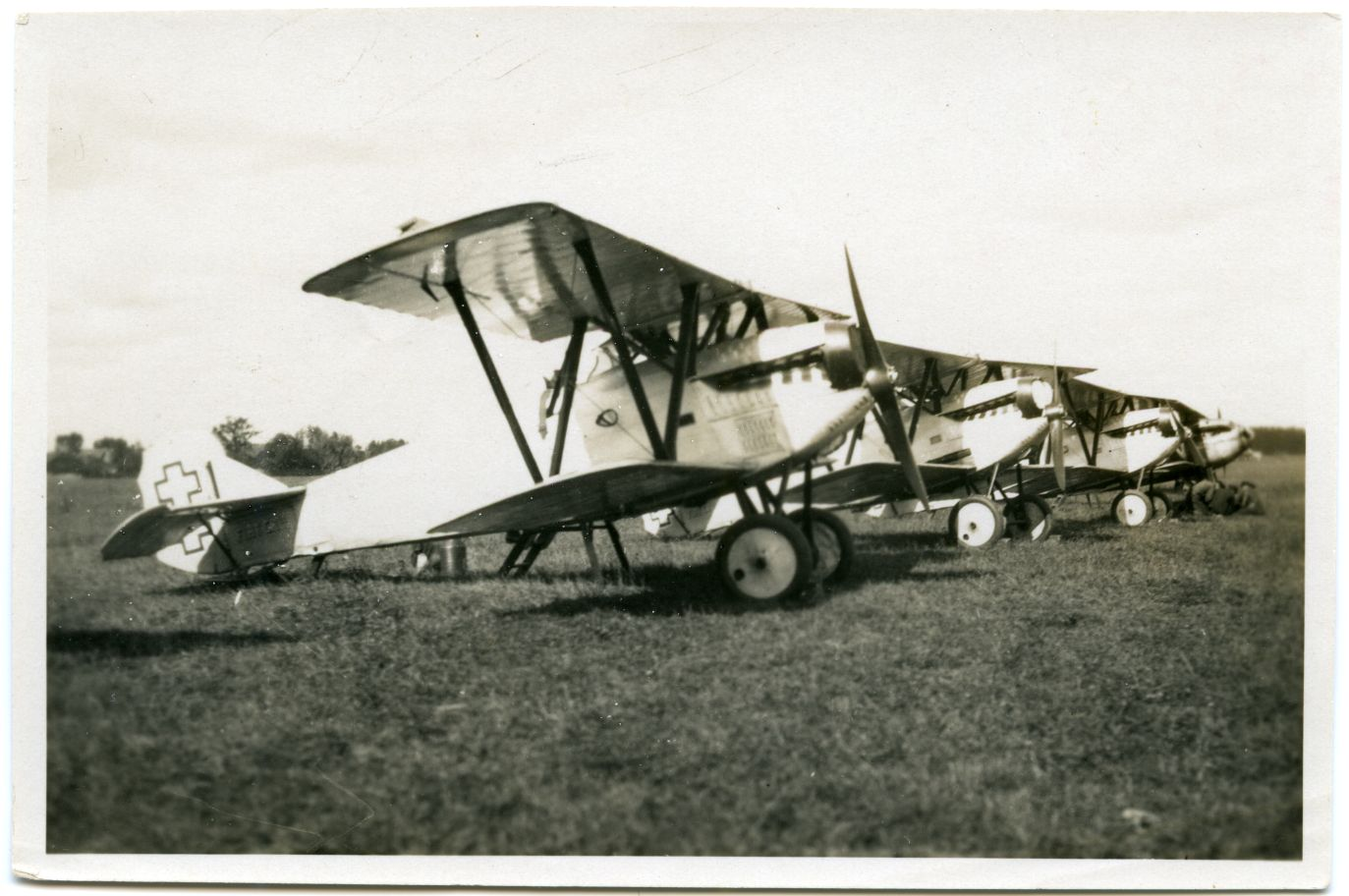
- A Fiat CR.20 of the Lithuanian Military Aviation
- Active: 1 March 1938 – 5 August 1940
- Country: Lithuania
- Branch: Lithuanian Military Aviation
- Type: Fighter squadron
- Role: Fighter aviation

Aircraft flown
- Fighter: Fiat CR.20
- Klemm Kl 35b

The 7th Squadron of the Lithuanian Military Aviation (Lithuanian: Lietuvos karo aviacijos 7-oji eskadrilė) was a fighter squadron of the Lithuanian Air Force (then titled Military Aviation) that existed from 1938 until August 1940. It was stationed in Kaunas.

== Establishment ==
The expansion of Lithuanian Military Aviation was part of the modernisation programme of the Lithuanian Army initiated in 1935. Mindaugas Sereičikas divides the development of Lithuanian Military Aviation into three stages. The first stage (1920–1927) involved the formation of four combat squadrons, the initial training of personnel, and the establishment and expansion of the infrastructure at Kaunas Airfield. During the second stage (1930–1934), two additional combat squadrons were formed, the Military Aviation School was established, systematic pilot training began, the Zokniai and Pajuostis airfields were established, and serial aircraft production commenced. The third stage (1935–1938) saw the formation of two further squadrons, the re-equipment of combat squadrons, and the expansion of the Military Aviation Workshops.

The 7th Squadron, one of the two squadrons established during this period, was formed on 1 March 1938. It received the Italian Fiat CR.20 fighter aircraft then operated by the Lithuanian Military Aviation's 5th Squadron. These aircraft had been acquired in the early 1920s and were already nearaly obsolete.

Organisationally, the squadron was part of the 4th (Fighter) Group. The group also included the 1st Squadron, established in 1920, and the 5th Squadron, established in 1932.

== Commanders ==
The squadron was commanded by:

- 1 March 1938 – 16 January 1940: Major Jonas Vaičius (1906–1969)
- 16 January 1940 – 5 August 1940: Major Jonas Adomaitis (1902–1996)

== Personnel ==
Jonas Pyragius, 1927

The personnel of the Lithuanian Military Aviation were organised according to the peacetime establishment table No. 95 of the Military Aviation. According to this table, a fighter squadron was authorised 13 flying personnel positions, including seven officers and six enlisted men. In wartime, squadrons were to adopt the organisation specified in wartime establishment table No. 49, increasing the number of flying personnel from 13 to 14.

The squadron's personnel were formed in three stages. In April 1938, military pilots were transferred from other Military Aviation units to form the nucleus of the new squadron. During flying training placements in the spring and summer of 1938, four student pilots who had completed the Military Aviation School distinguished themselves and were assigned to the 7th Squadron as permanent military pilots in the autumn. From January 1939 to October 1940, the squadron's flying personnel changed through a process of rotation. Newly assigned enlisted military pilots replaced four pilots who had joined the squadron in November 1938 and were subsequently transferred to other fighter squadrons.

During the mobilisation announced in September 1939, the squadron's flying personnel were reinforced by Major Jonas Pyragius (one of the nation's first glider pilots), Junior Sergeant J. Valaitis, and reserve pilots called up for service: Sergeant Leonas Miliūnas, Junior Sergeant Jonas Dovydaitis, Corporal Anatolijus Kraucevičius, Private Jurgis Steikūnas, and Private Juozas Vytautas Aidas.

A total of 21 military pilots served in the squadron during its existence.

1. Juozas Vaičius, Major, 1 April 1938 – 16 January 1940, squadron commander
2. Vytautas Varanavičius, Captain, 13 April 1938 – 16 February 1940, military pilot; deputy squadron commander from 1 September 1939
3. Jonas Grincius, Captain, 14 April 1938 – 1 November 1940, technical officer; deputy squadron commander from February 1940
4. Aleksandras Vachauzas, Senior Sergeant, 1 April 1938 – 16 July 1940, enlisted military pilot
5. Petras Kasperiūnas, Junior Sergeant, 1 April 1938 – 23 March 1939, enlisted military pilot
6. Jonas Žerolis, Junior Sergeant, 1 April 1938 – 18 September 1939, enlisted military pilot
7. Leonas Alekna, Junior Sergeant, 1 November 1938 – 18 September 1939, enlisted military pilot
8. Stasys Žeiba, Junior Sergeant, 1 November 1938 – 18 September 1939, enlisted military pilot
9. Bronius Vasiliauskas, Junior Sergeant, 1 November 1938 – 18 September 1939, enlisted military pilot
10. Aleksandras Kostkus (Kostkevičius), Lieutenant, 1 September 1938 – 4 October 1940, officer pilot
11. Vaclovas Numgaudas, Second Lieutenant, 1 September 1938 – 12 September 1939, officer pilot
12. Juozas Valevičius, Lieutenant, 1 September 1938 – 22 October 1940, officer pilot
13. Stasys Ksaveras Krosniūnas (Krasnickas), Lieutenant, 1 September 1938 – 22 October 1940, officer pilot
14. Alfonsas Svilas, Captain, 20 October 1938 – 1 September 1939, deputy squadron commander
15. Leopoldas Tribė, Lieutenant, 18 November 1939 – 22 October 1940, officer pilot
16. Vladas Juzeliūnas, Junior Sergeant, from 1 November 1939, enlisted military pilot
17. Kazys Juška, Junior Sergeant, from 1 November 1939, enlisted military pilot
18. Vladas Knistautas, Junior Sergeant, from 1 November 1939, enlisted military pilot
19. Stasys Užkurys, Junior Sergeant, from 1 November 1939, enlisted military pilot
20. Jonas Adomaitis, Major, 16 January 1940 – 5 August 1940, squadron commander
21. Valentinas Irlikis, Lieutenant, 1940 – 16 November 1940, officer pilot

Approximately 40% of the squadron's flying personnel changed each year. The personnel rotation suggests that the 7th Squadron served as a transitional unit in which student pilots from the final year of the Military Aviation School, intended to become fighter pilots, completed their flying placements. On 15 June 1940, the squadron had 11 military pilots out of the 13 authorised positions.

== Combat readiness ==
Throughout its existence, the 7th Squadron was assigned fewer aircraft than its authorised establishment. Its maximum strength was nine aircraft, compared with the authorised 12 combat aircraft and one liaison aircraft. The squadron consistently had more flying personnel than aircraft. Only approximately one-third of its pilots were experienced.

During the mobilisation of September 1939, the squadron encountered significant difficulties due to a shortage of qualified personnel and necessary equipment. Following the mobilisation order, it took three days for the squadron to become fully operational. Until then, it could operate only at the strength of a single flight (two to three fighters), representing approximately one-third of its potential capacity.

== Base ==
The squadron was established at Zokniai Airfield in Šiauliai, but was transferred to Kaunas in mid-March 1938. From 1938 to 1940, it was based at the Aleksotas–Žagariškiai Airfield.

== Aircraft ==
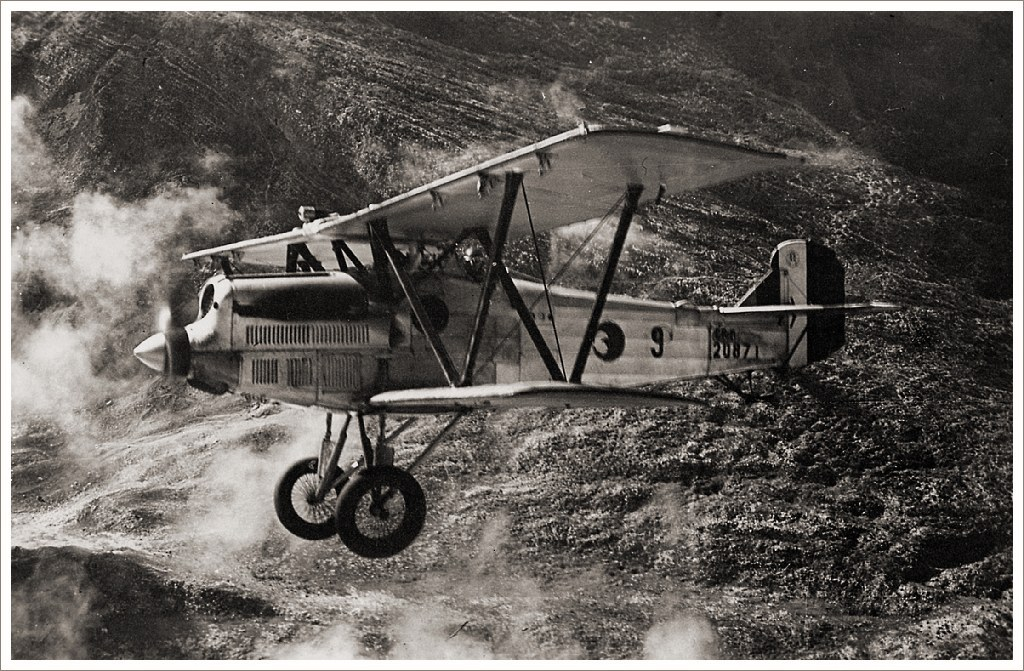
Fiat CR.20

In 1938, all nine Fiat CR.20 fighters then operated by the Military Aviation were transferred to the newly established 7th Squadron.

These aircraft were among the most heavily used military aircraft in Lithuania, having accumulated between 400 and 600 flying hours. They were also technically obsolete. Half of them had undergone repairs on two or more occasions, and they were not equipped for night flying.

The number of aircraft was below the establishment specified in the 1938 handbook for military headquarters. While a fighter squadron was supposed to have 12 fighters and one liaison aircraft, the 7th Squadron had only nine fighters. Regulations also stipulated that a squadron should consist of three flights, each comprising three to four fighters, meaning that it was expected to have at least 12 fighters.

Compared with the other squadrons of the fighter group, the 7th Squadron was the least well-equipped. At the end of 1938, the 1st Squadron had 13 aircraft available for operational tasks, while the 5th Squadron had 14 fighters. Although squadron establishments envisaged not only fighters but also liaison and training aircraft, none were assigned to the 7th Squadron between 1938 and 1940.

Wreckage of Fiat CR.20 No. 38 following an accident involving G. Janulevičius

Following the mobilisation order in September 1939, a single Klemm Kl 35b aircraft belonging to the Aviation Unit of the Lithuanian Riflemen's Union was assigned to the 7th Squadron as a liaison aircraft on 17 September. Its pilot was Antanas Valaitis, a member of the Lithuanian Riflemen's Union and a junior sergeant, who had been participating in reserve military personnel training at the Military Aviation School since 25 August 1939.

The number of fighters in the 7th Squadron varied between 1938 and 1940 due to scheduled and unscheduled maintenance and gradually decreased. Two fighters were lost during this period. On 27 April 1938, a Fiat CR.20 (manufacturer's serial number 30), piloted by student pilot Junior Sergeant Kazys Smetona, was destroyed in an accident and written off. Another Fiat CR.20 (manufacturer's serial number 38) crashed on 13 June 1940 due to a piloting error by student pilot Gediminas Janulevičius. On the eve of the Soviet occupation of Lithuania on 15 June 1940, the squadron had seven fighters, representing only 58% of its authorised combat aircraft strength.

== Disbandment ==
The squadron was disbanded on 5 August 1940, following the Soviet occupation of Lithuania, as the Soviet Union dissolved the Lithuanian Military Aviation. The Soviet Air Forces did not take over the aircraft previously operated by the squadron; they were instead used as training targets in late 1949 - early 1941.
