= 40M =

40M may refer to:

- 40-meter band, or 7-MHz band, an amateur radio frequency band
- 40M Nimrod, a World War II Hungarian anti-aircraft tank
- 40M Turán I, a Hungarian tank of World War II

== See also ==
- M40 (disambiguation)
