= SIAI S.58 =

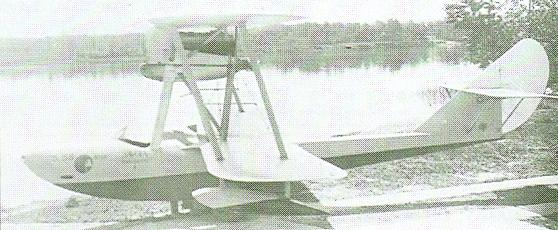

General information
- Type: Flying boat fighter
- National origin: Italy
- Manufacturer: SIAI
- Primary user: Italy
- Number built: ca. 5

History
- First flight: 1924

The SIAI S.58 or Savoia-Marchetti S.M.58 was an Italian flying boat fighter prototype of the 1920s designed and manufactured by SIAI.

== Design and development ==
=== S.58 ===
In 1924, the Regia Marina (Italian Royal Navy) issued a requirement for a replacement for its Macchi M.7ter flying boat fighter. To compete with the Macchi M.26 for a production order as the replacement, SIAI developed the S.58. It was a wooden, single-seat, single-bay biplane with a hull based on that of the SIAI S.51 racing flying boat which had participated in the 1922 Schneider Trophy race. The S.58's engine, a 221-kilowatt (296-brake horsepower) Hispano-Suiza HS 42 V8 driving a pusher propeller, was mounted on struts above the hull. SIAI proposed an armament of two fixed, forward-firing 7.7-millimeter (0.303-inch) Vickers machine guns mounted on the hull on either side of the cockpit.

The S.58 made its first flight early in the summer of 1924 and on 25 August 1924 set a world altitude record for aircraft of its type by reaching 5,831 meters (19,130 feet) with a payload of 250 kilograms (551 pounds). SIAI built three prototypes, but the Regia Marina opted to save money by re-engining the Macchi M.7ter to extend its service life rather than purchase a new aircraft. SIAI did, however, build at least one more S.58, which the Scuola di Alta Velocità (High Speed School) at Desenzano used.

=== S.58bis ===
SIAI later fitted the first S.58 prototype with a 313-kilowatt (420-horsepower) Fiat A.20 V12, redesignating the re-engined aircraft the S.58bis. In 1927, the Regia Marina again held a contest for a replacement for the Macchi M.7ter, and SIAI entered the S.58bis. The Regia Marina found it impressive enough to make plans to procure 97 S.58bis aircraft, but these plans were cancelled when the Regia Marina again chose as an economy measure to extend the M.7ter's service life by re-engining it, and no production order materialized for the S.58bis.

=== S.58ter ===
In the autumn of 1928, the S.58ter, a slightly modified S.58bis also employing the Fiat A 20 V12 engine, flew for the first time. In 1929, the Regia Marina again organized a contest for an M.7ter replacement, and SIAI entered the S.58ter. The S.58ter lost out to the Macchi M.41bis and did not win a production order.

== Operators ==
Kingdom of Italy

- Regia Aeronautica
- Regia Marina

== Specifications (S.58bis) ==
Data from Green, William, and Gordon Swanborough The Complete Book of Fighters: An Illustrated Encyclopedia of Every Fighter Aircraft Built and Flown, New York: SMITHMARK Publishers, 1994, ISBN 0-8317-3939-8

General characteristics

- Crew: 1
- Length: 9.10 m (29 ft 10.25 in)
- Wingspan: 11.25 m (36 ft 10.8 in)
- Height: 2.75 m (9 ft 0.25 in)
- Wing area: 29.10 m^{2} (313.24 sq ft)
- Empty weight: 1,117 kg (2,462 lb)
- Gross weight: 1,477 kg (3,256 lb)
- Powerplant: 1 × Fiat A.20 V12 piston , 313 kW (420 hp)

Performance

- Maximum speed: 267 km/h (166 mph, 144 kn)

Armament

- 2 × fixed forward-firing 7.7-millimeter (0.303-inch) Vickers machine guns

Notes:

- Time to 3,000 m (9,842 ft): 7.66 min

== See also ==
- Savoia-Marchetti
- SIAI S.51

Aircraft of comparable role, configuration, and era

- Macchi M.26
- Macchi M.41

Related lists

- List of seaplanes and flying boats
