= Fiat A.20 =

1920s Italian piston aircraft engine

A.20
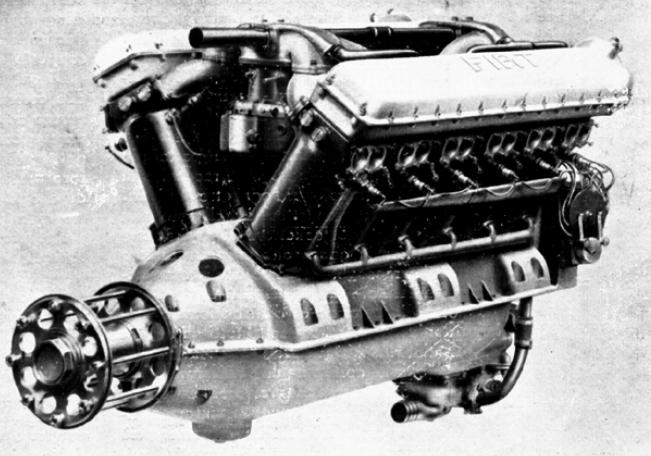
- Type: Water-cooled V12 engine
- National origin: Italy
- Manufacturer: FIAT
- Major applications: Fiat CR.20; Macchi M.41

The Fiat A.20 was an Italian aero-engine of the 1920s. It was a water-cooled V12 engine that was used by early versions of the Fiat CR.20 fighter and the Macchi M.41 seaplane.

In 1923, FIAT built the A.15, a 430 hp (320 kW) water-cooled V12 engine. While no production of the A.15 ensued, it formed the basis for the Fiat A.20, which differed in being a Monobloc engine, and delivered a similar power despite a reduction in capacity from 20.3 to 18.7 L (1,239 to 1,141 in^{3}).

== Variants ==
A.20
Normal compression (5.7:1 compression)
A.20 S.
High compression version (6:1 compression)
A.20 AQ.
(AQ - Alta Quota - high altitude) High altitude version (8:1 compression)

== Applications ==
- Ansaldo AC.4
- CANT 15
- CANT 25
- Fiat CR.20
- Macchi M.41
- Macchi M.71
- Piaggio P.6
- SIAI S.58bis
- SIAI S.67

== Specifications (A.20) ==
Data from The Fiat A.20,Jane's all the World's Aircraft 1928.

=== General characteristics ===
- Type: Water-cooled 60° V-12
- Bore: 115 mm (4.53 in)
- Stroke: 150 mm (5.91 in)
- Displacement: 18.7 L (1,141 in^{3})
- Length: 1,645 mm (64.76 in)
- Width: 645 mm (25.39 in)
- Height: 845 mm (33.27 in)
- Dry weight: 340 kg (749.6 lb)

=== Components ===
- Valvetrain: Overhead camshafts operating two inlet and two exhaust valves per cylinder via rockers
- Fuel system: Two twin carburettors
- Cooling system: water-cooled

=== Performance ===
- Power output: **A.20 460 hp (343.0 kW) at 2,300 rpm
  - A.20S 510 hp (380.3 kW) at 2,400 rpm
  - A.20AQ 430 hp (320.7 kW) at 2,060 rpm maximum continuous; 540 hp (402.7 kW) at 2,400 rpm maximum momentary output
- Compression ratio: **A.20 5.7:1
  - A.20S 6:1
  - A.20AQ 8:1
- Specific fuel consumption: 0.528 lb/(hp⋅h) (0.321 kg/kWh)

== See also ==
Related lists

- List of aircraft engines
