= Fiat CR.1 =

Italian fighter aircraft

CR.1
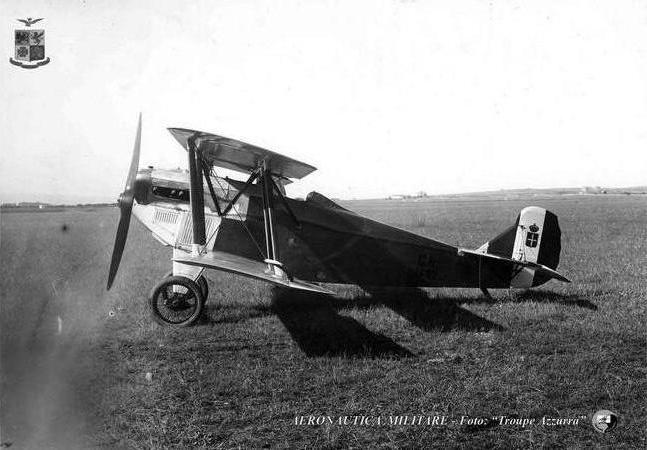

General information
- Type: Fighter
- Manufacturer: Fiat
- Designer: Celestino Rosatelli
- Primary users: Regia Aeronautica Latvian Air Force
- Number built: 240

History
- Introduction date: 1924

The Fiat CR.1 was an Italian biplane fighter aircraft of the 1920s. Of wood-and-fabric construction, it was designed by Celestino Rosatelli, from whom it gained the 'CR' designation. Its most distinctive feature was that the lower wings were longer than the upper ones.

== Design and development ==
Regia Aeronautica requested two prototype aircraft from Fiat in the early 1920s. The results were designated MM.1 and MM.2, identical except for the rudder (one had a rounded, counterbalanced rudder) and engines (they had differing marks of Hispano-Suiza piston engines).

The aircraft was a biplane of conventional layout, with fixed tailskid landing gear and an open cockpit, with the pilot's head aligned with the trailing edge of the upper wing. The V8 engine powered a fixed-pitch two-blade wooden propeller. The landing gear had a fixed axle between the wheels. It carried two synchronized 7.7 mm (.303 in) Vickers machine guns firing through the propeller arc.

The two prototypes were evaluated against another biplane fighter, the SIAI S.52, and proved superior in manoeuvrability and top speed. Accordingly, contracts were issued to three Italian companies for three batches of production aircraft, to be designated CR.1:

- 109 units to be built by Fiat.
- 40 units to be built by OFM of Napoli.
- 100 units to be built by SIAI.

After two preproduction prototypes were again flight tested, a total of 240 units were placed in Italian military service, beginning in 1925.

== Operational history ==
The Regia Aeronautica ordered 240 CR.1s and began equipping its 1st Fighter Group in 1924. By 1926, 12 Italian fighter squadrons had been allocated the aircraft. In the same year, Fiat introduced an updated all-metal version, the CR.20.

Though both Belgium and Poland evaluated and rejected the aircraft, an export order was received from Latvia. Their nine CR.1s, fitted with the 224 kW (300 hp) Hispano-Suiza HS8N8 engine, served in Latvian Naval Aviation until 1936.

In the 1930s, some CR.1s were fitted with Isotta Fraschini Asso Caccia engines of 328 kW (440 hp), which improved their performance. These units were given to 163 Squadriglia, based at Rhodes in the Aegean Sea. Those units were withdrawn from active service in 1937.

== Operators ==
Kingdom of Italy

- Regia Aeronautica

Latvia

- Latvian Air Force
- Latvian Navy

== Specifications (CR.1) ==
Data from The Encyclopedia of Military Aircraft

General characteristics

- Crew: 1
- Length: 6.24 m (20 ft 6 in)
- Wingspan: 8.95 m (29 ft 4 in)
- Height: 2.4 m (7 ft 10 in)
- Wing area: 23 m^{2} (250 sq ft)
- Empty weight: 839 kg (1,850 lb)
- Max takeoff weight: 1,155 kg (2,546 lb)
- Powerplant: 1 × Isotta Fraschini Asso V-8 water-cooled piston engine, 240 kW (320 hp)
- Propellers: 2-bladed fixed-pitch propeller

Performance

- Maximum speed: 270 km/h (170 mph, 150 kn)
- Range: 650 km (400 mi, 350 nmi)
- Service ceiling: 7,450 m (24,440 ft)
- Wing loading: 48.43 kg/m^{2} (9.92 lb/sq ft)
- Power/mass: 0.2146 kW/kg (0.1305 hp/lb)

Armament

- Guns: 2 × fixed forward 7.7 mm (0.303 in) machine guns

== See also ==
Related lists

- List of Interwar military aircraft
- List of fighter aircraft
