= List of pusher aircraft by configuration and date =

A pusher aircraft is a type of aircraft using propellers placed behind the engines.
Pushers may be classified according to lifting surfaces layout (conventional or 3 surface, canard, joined wing, tailless and rotorcraft) as well as engine/propeller location and drive. For historical interest, pusher aircraft are also classified by date.
Some aircraft have a Push-pull configuration with both tractor and pusher engines. The list includes these even if the pusher engine is just added to a conventional layout (engines inside the wings or above the wing for example).

== Conventional and three surface layouts ==
The conventional layout of an aircraft has wings ahead of the empennage.

=== Direct drive ===
==== Propeller ahead of tail ====
===== Between frames (Farman layout) =====
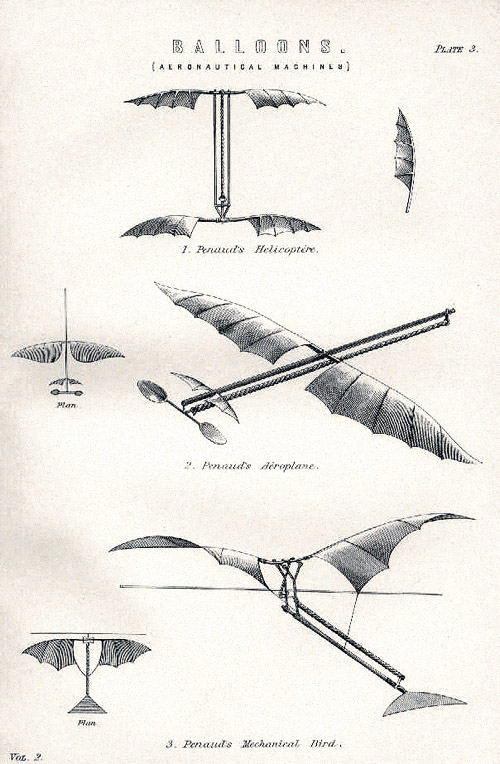
Top to bottom: 1870 helicopter; 1871 'Planophore; 1873 ornithopter

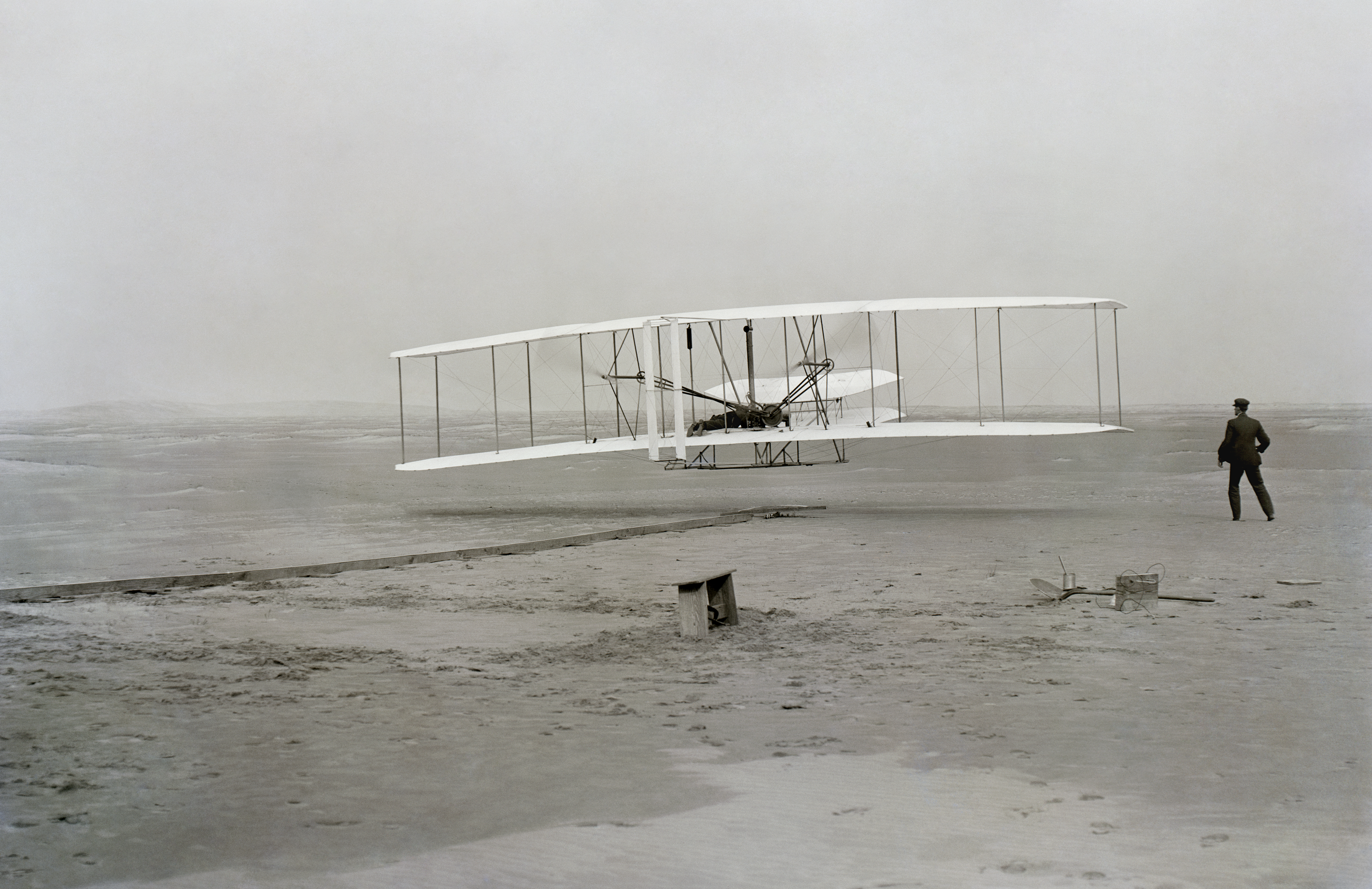
Wright Flyer 1903 pusher

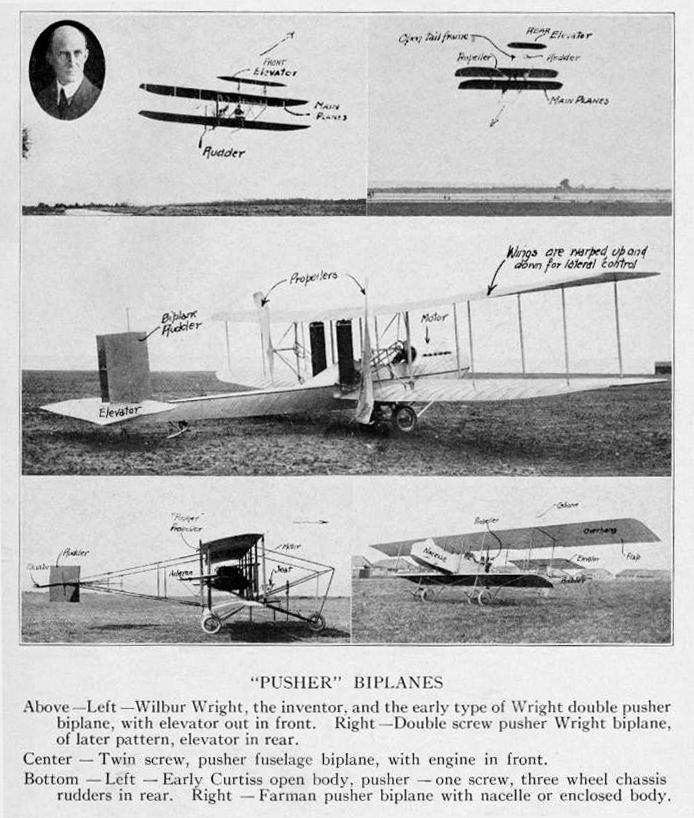
Wright, Curtiss and Farman pushers

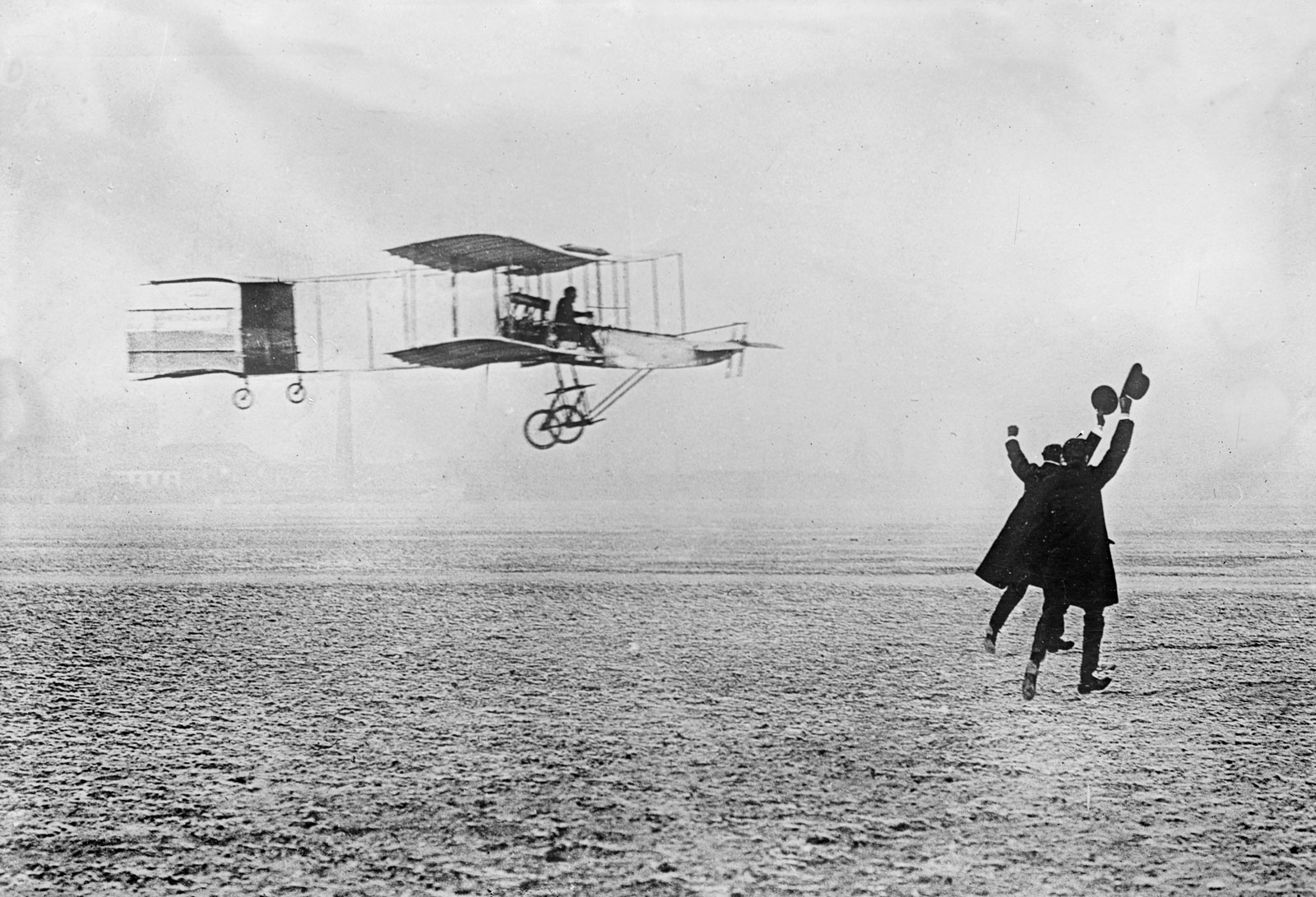
Voisin-Farman 1908

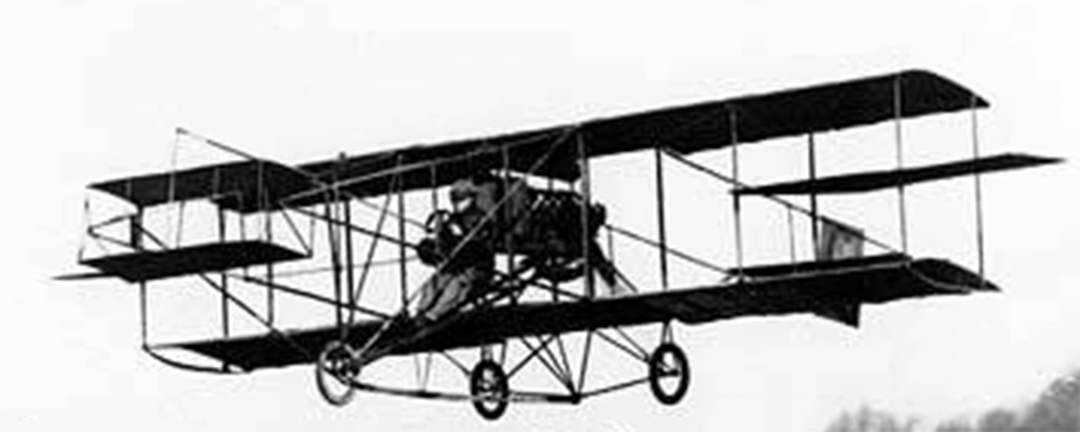
Curtiss n°2 (1909

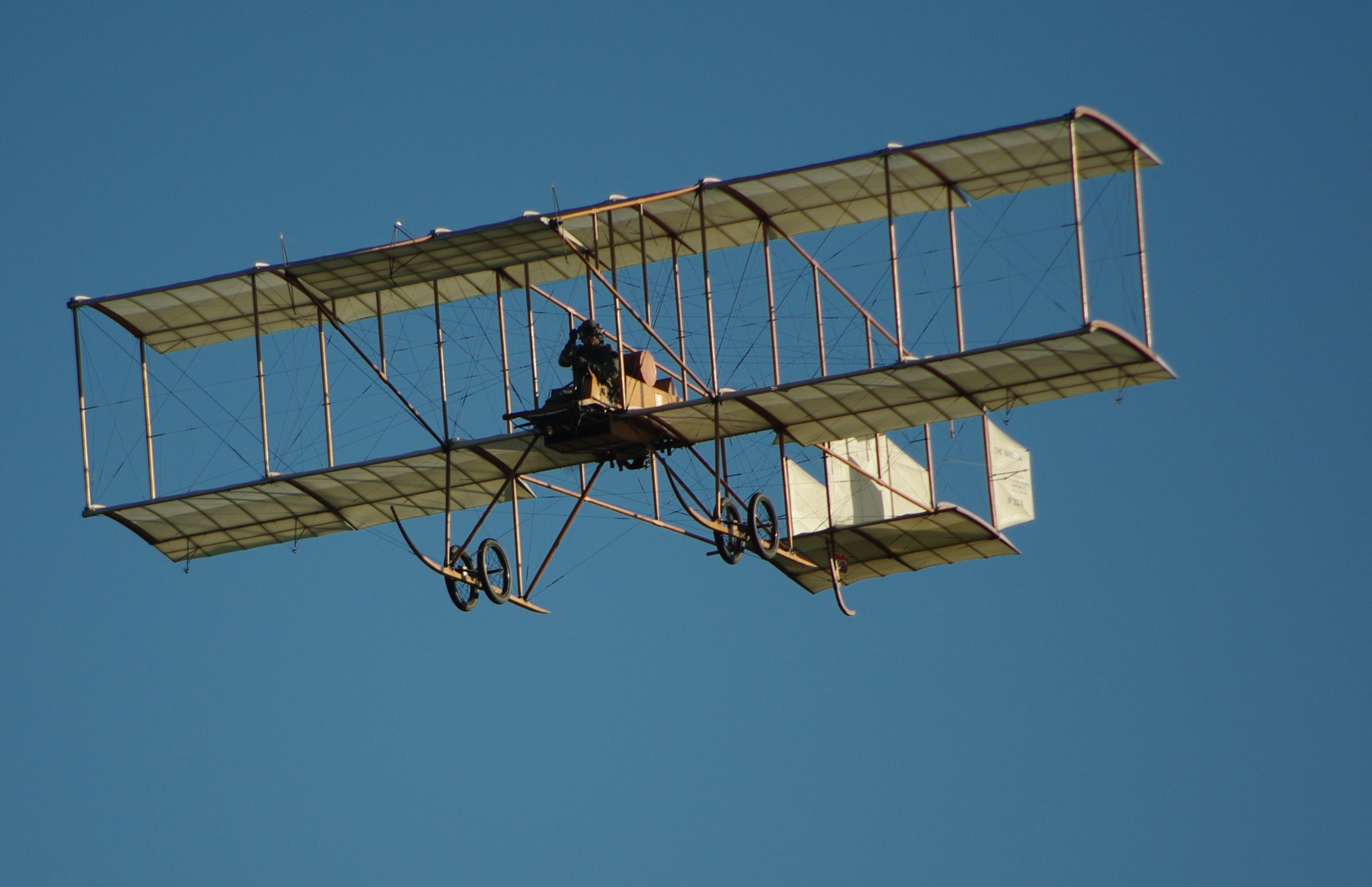
Bristol Boxkite (1910)

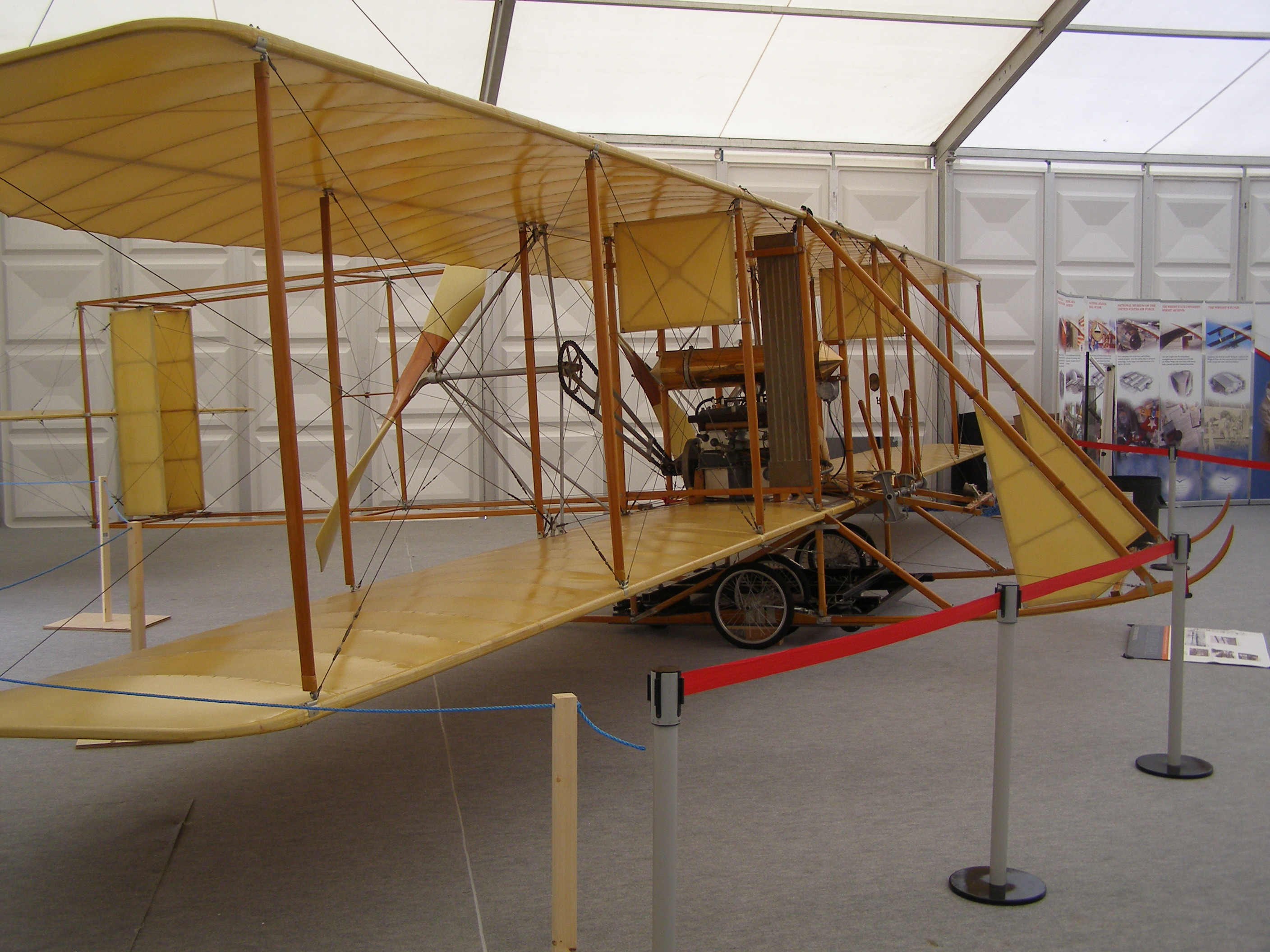
Wright Model B (1910)

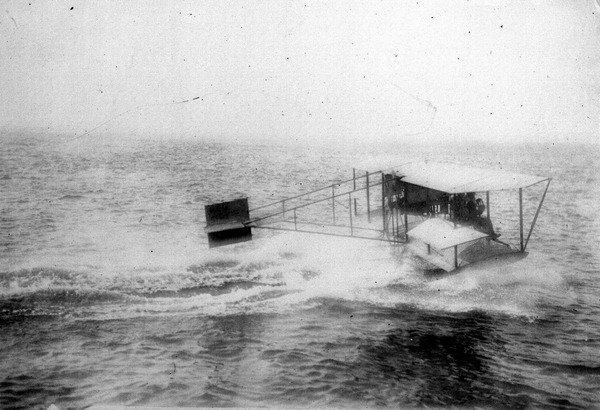
Curtiss Model E (1911)

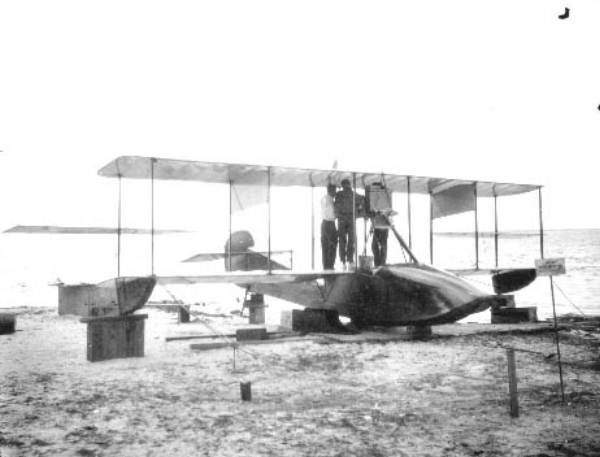
Curtiss Model F (1912)

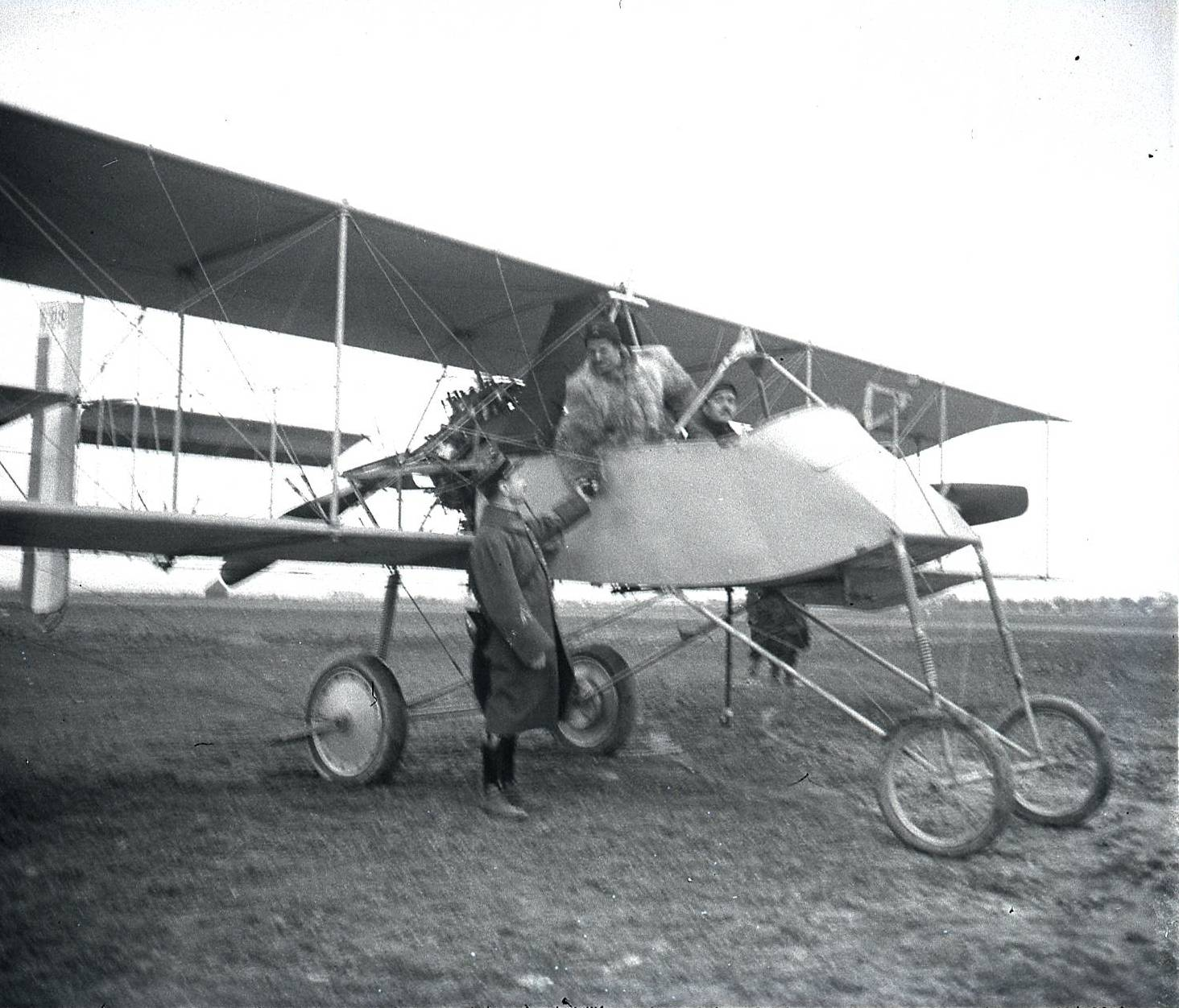
Voisin III (1914)

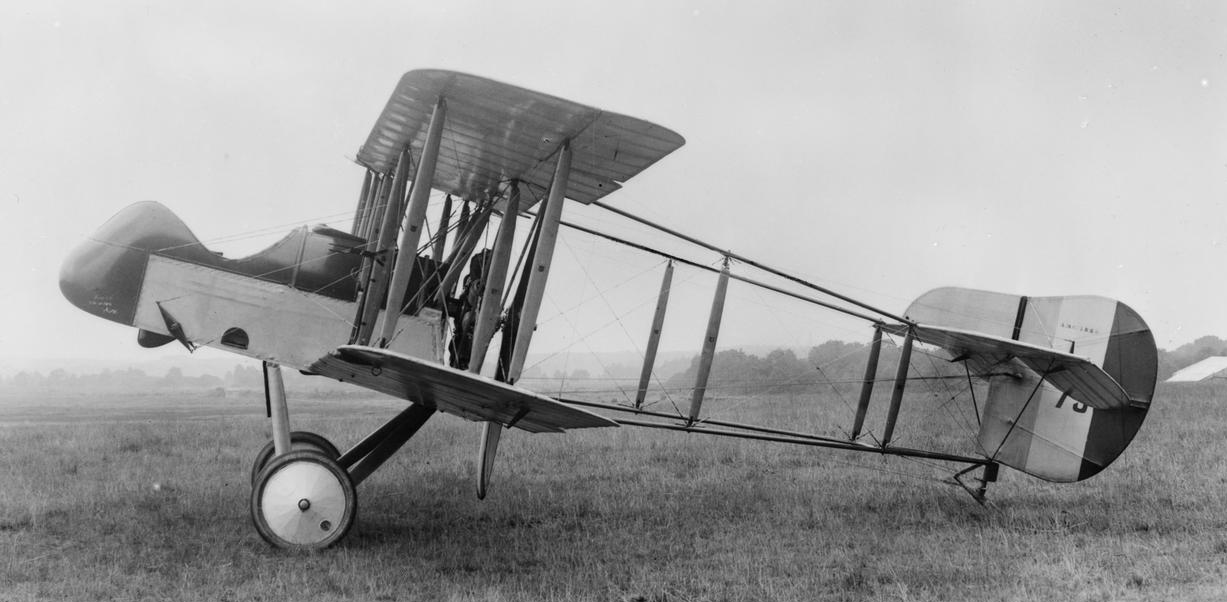
Airco DH.2 (1915)

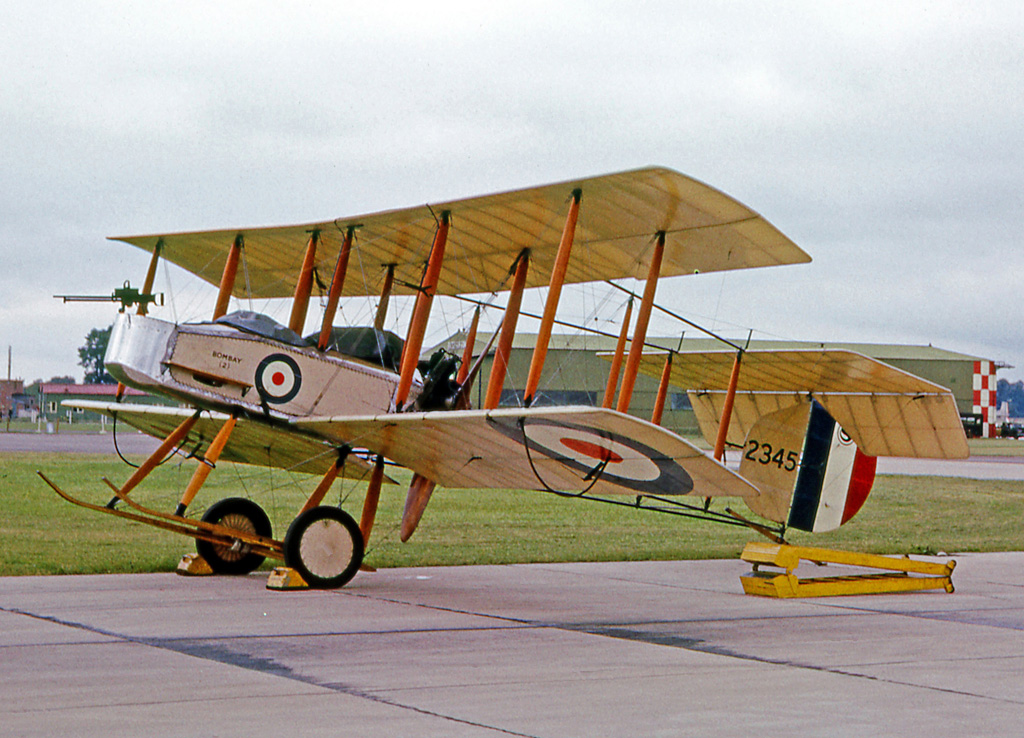
Vickers FB.5 (1915)

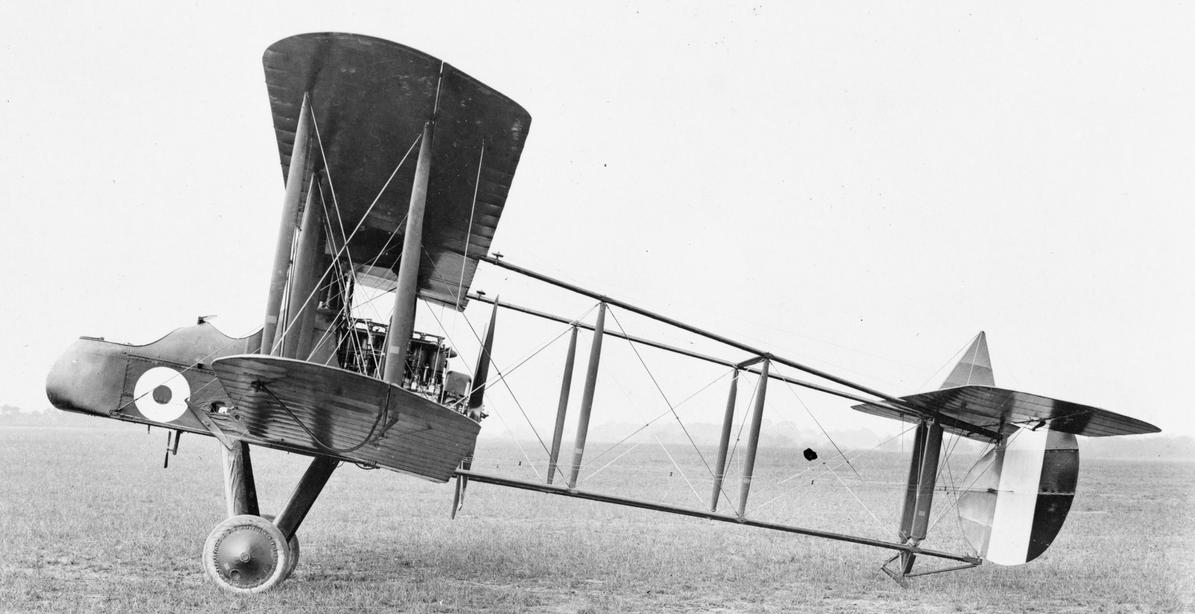
Royal Aircraft Factory F.E.2] (1915)

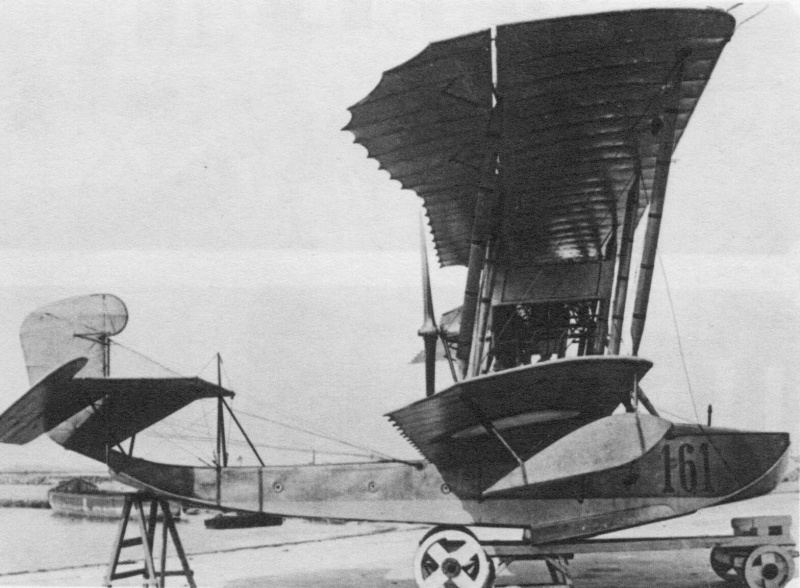
Grigorovitch M-9 (1916)

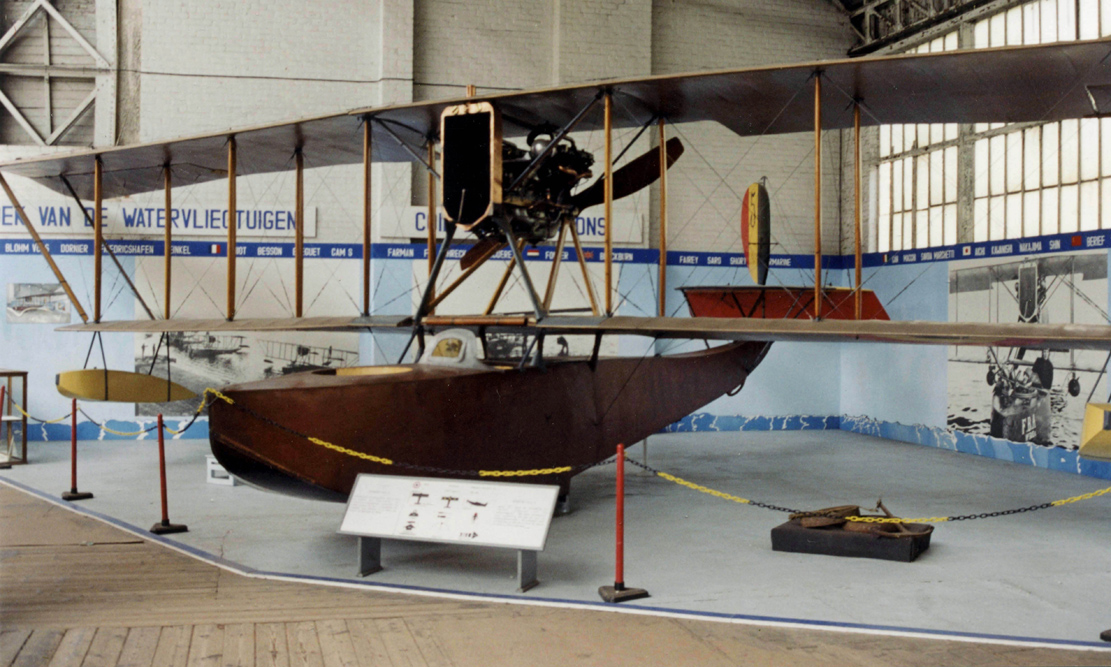
FBA Type H (1916)

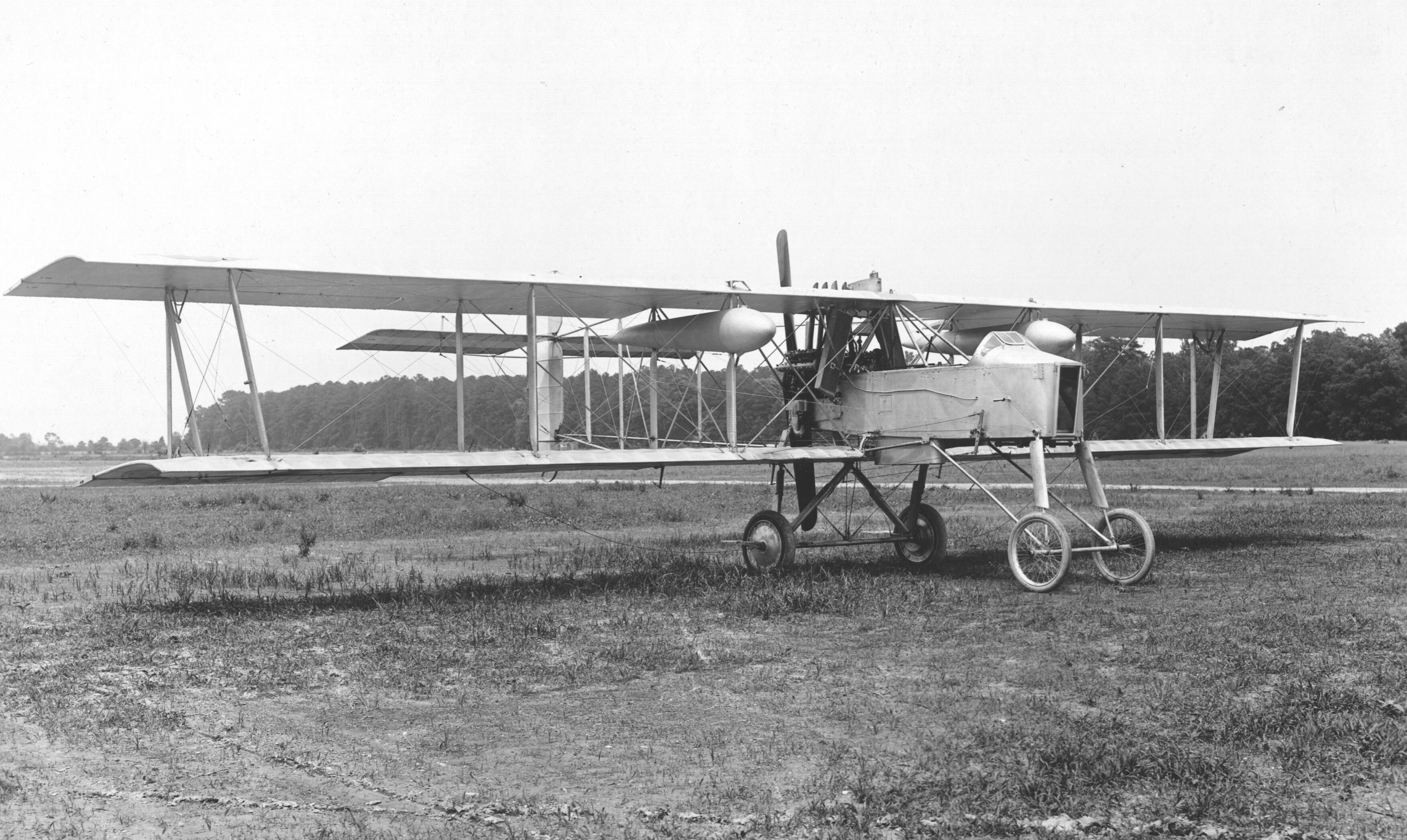
Voisin VIII (1916)

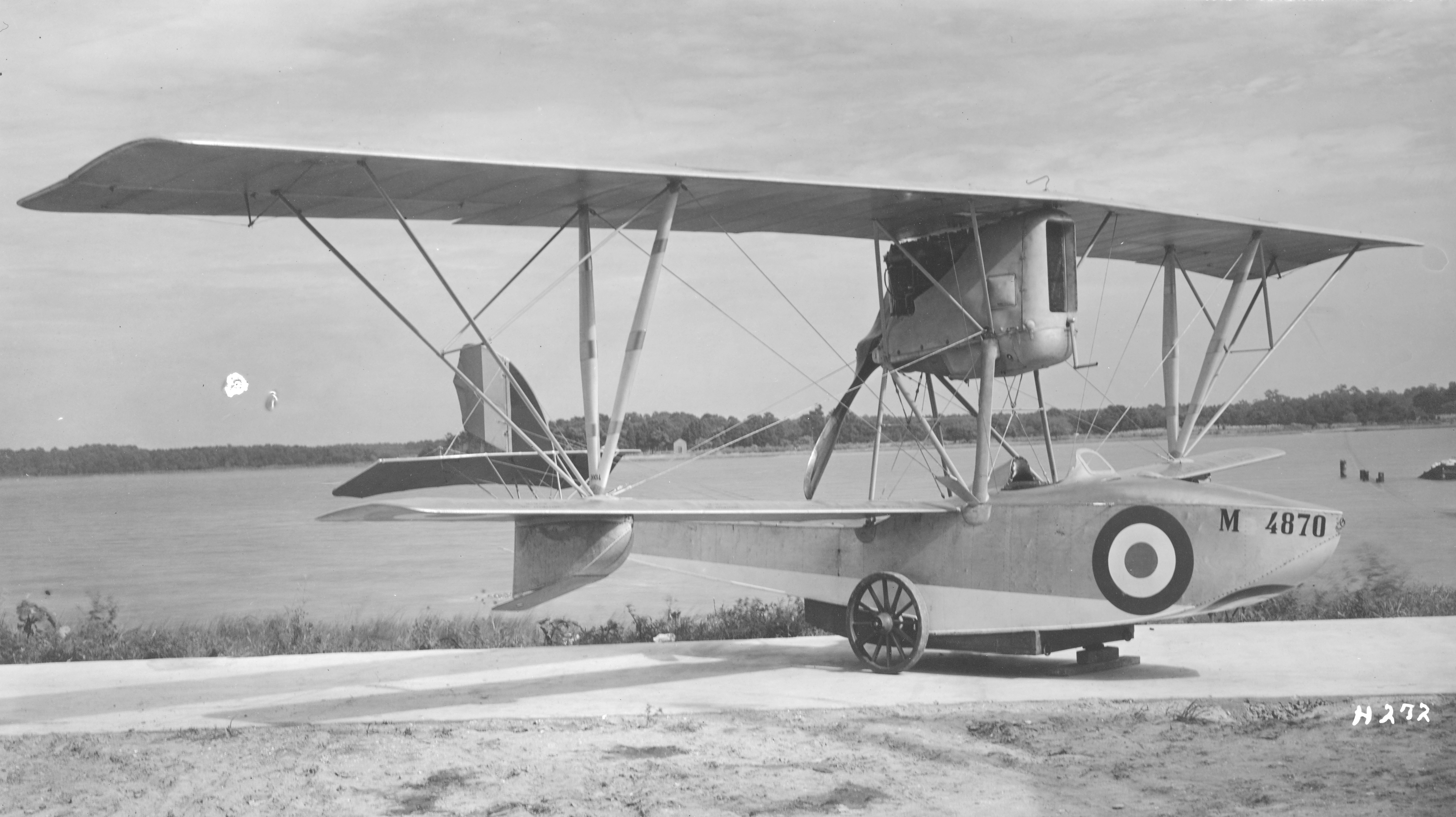
Macchi M.5 (1917)

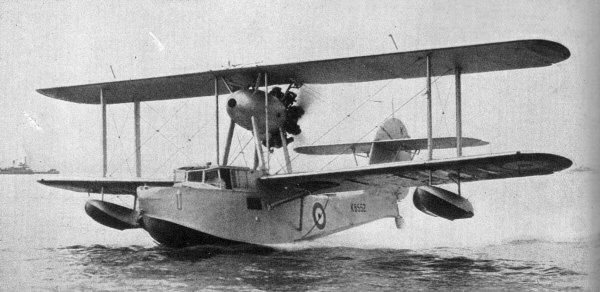
Supermarine Walrus flying boat (1933)

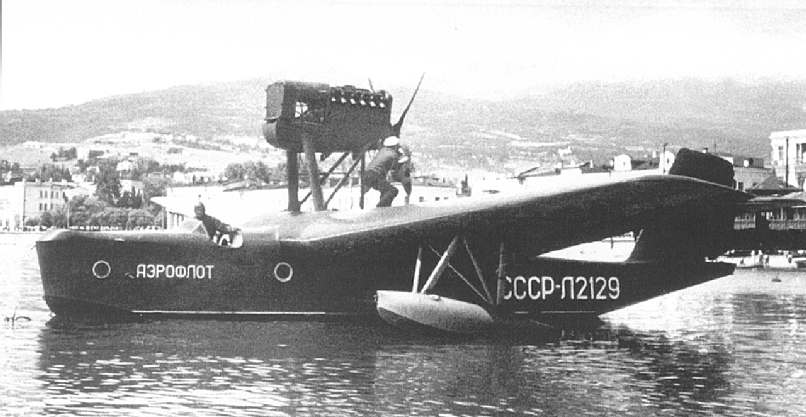
Bereiev MBR-2 (1935)

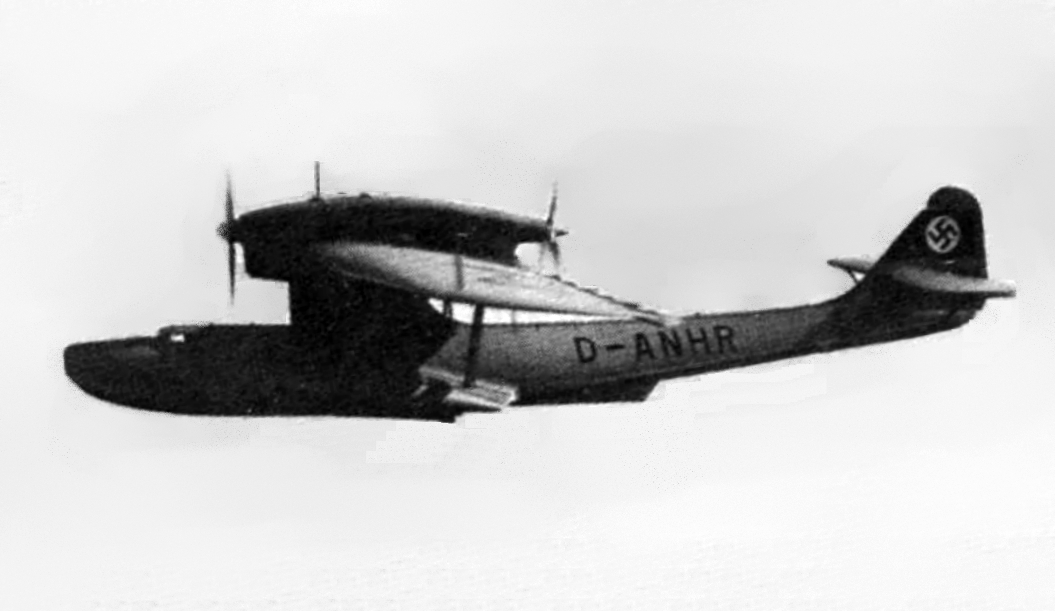
Dornier Do 18 (1935)

De Schelde S.21 drawings (1939)

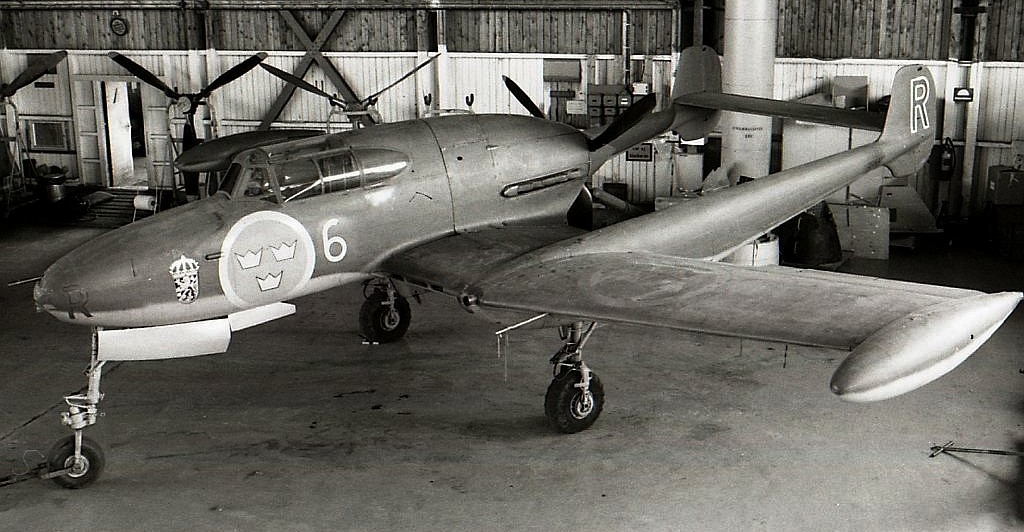
SAAB J 21 fighter (1943).

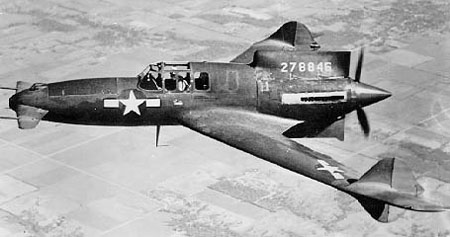
Experimental fighter Curtiss-Wright XP-55 Ascender (1943)

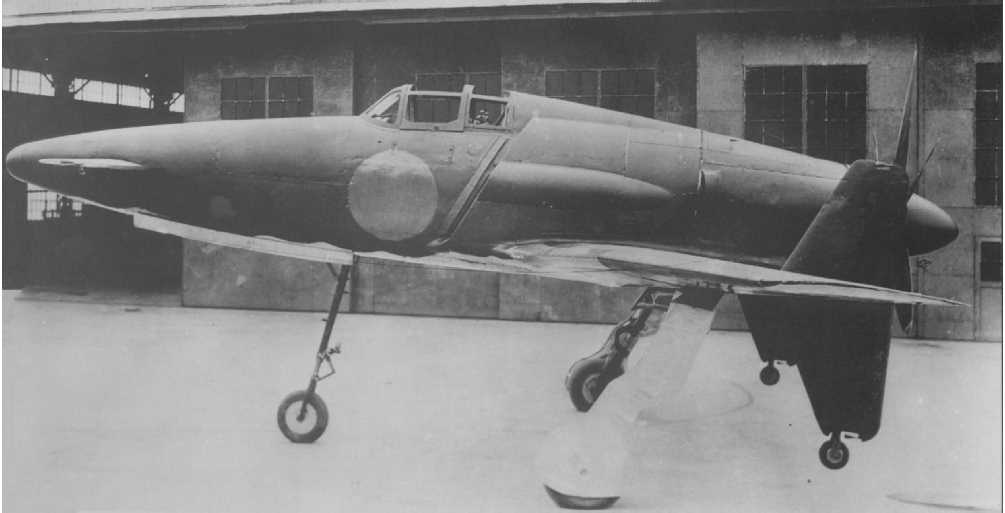
Expeeimental fighter Kyushu J7W Shinden (1945)

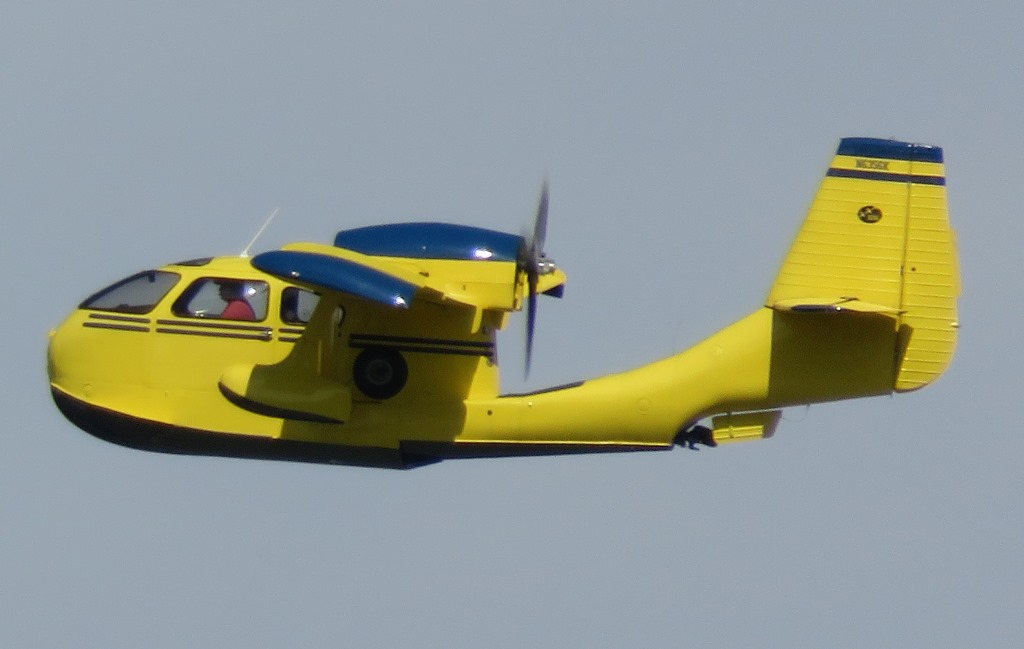
Republic RC-3 Seabee with gear retracted (1945)

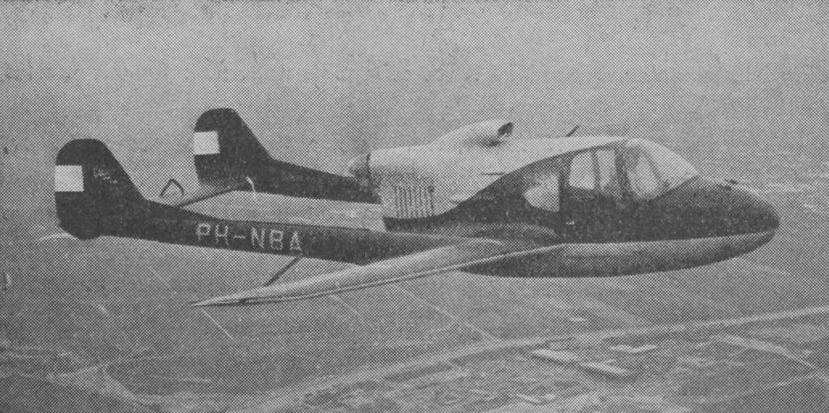
Fokker F.25 (1946)

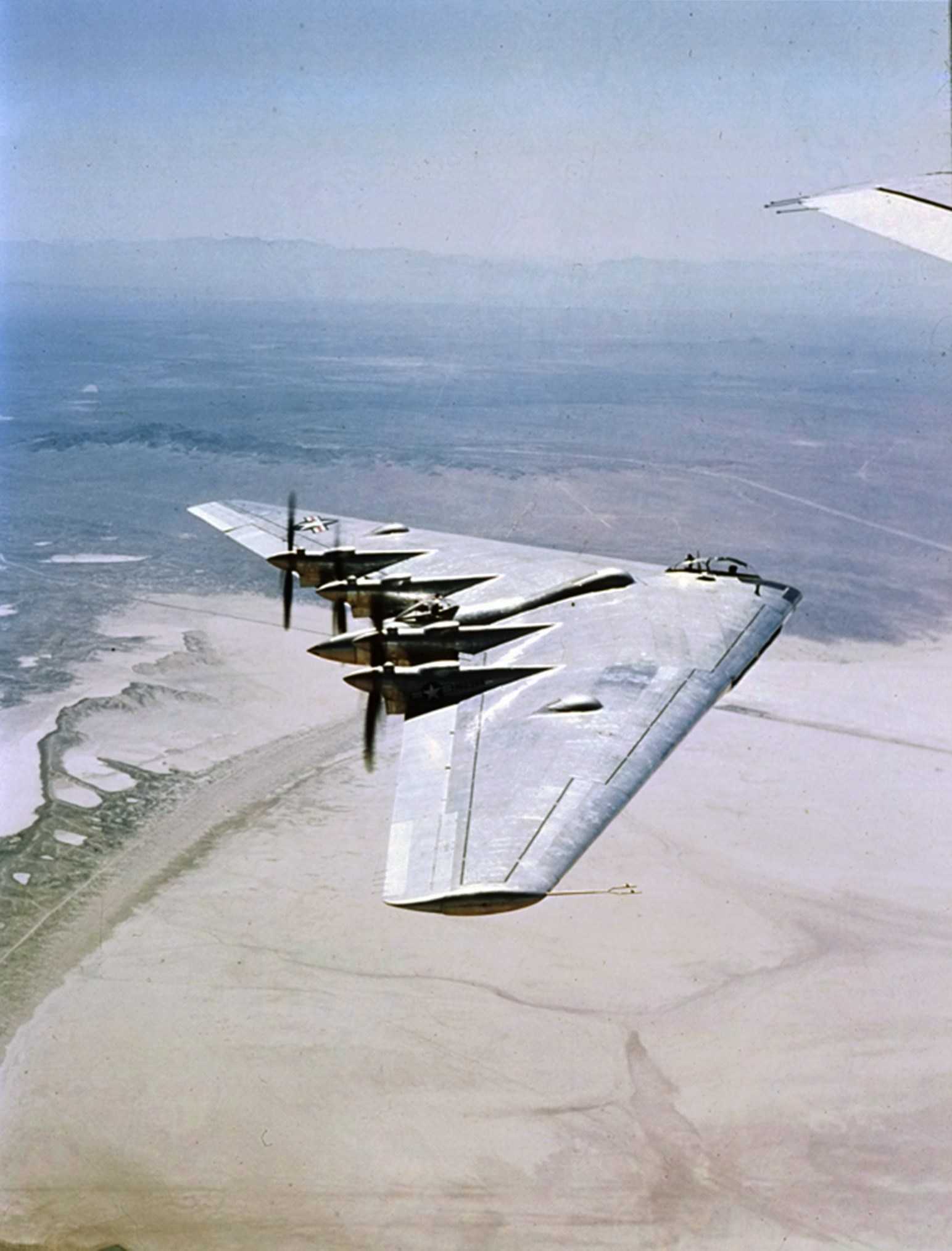
Experimental flying wing bomber Northrop XB-35 (1946)

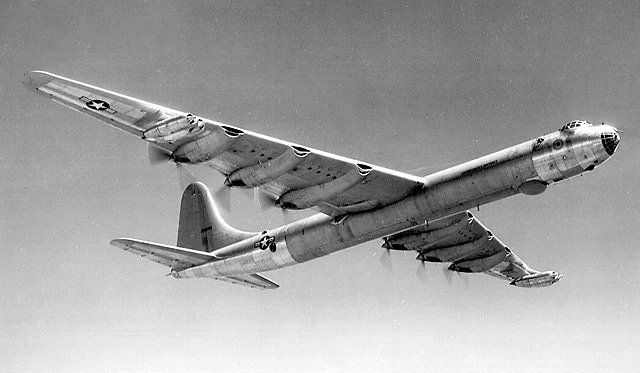
Convair B-36 Peacemaker (1946)

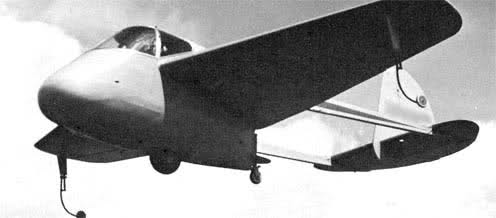
Alaparma Baldo (1949)

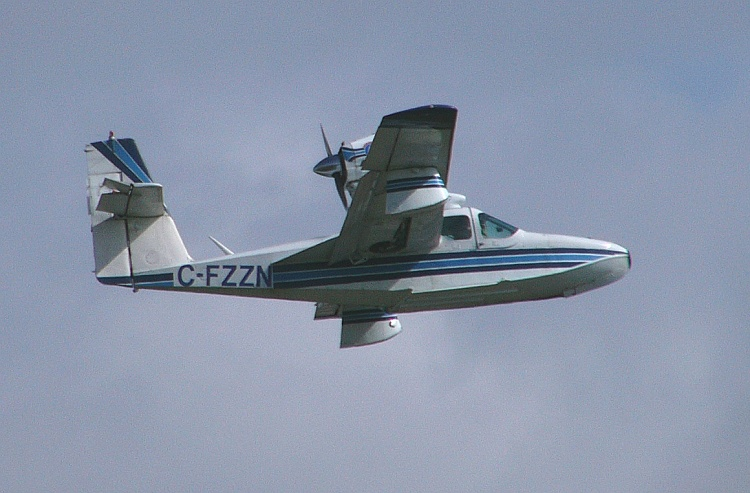
Lake Buccaneer (1950)

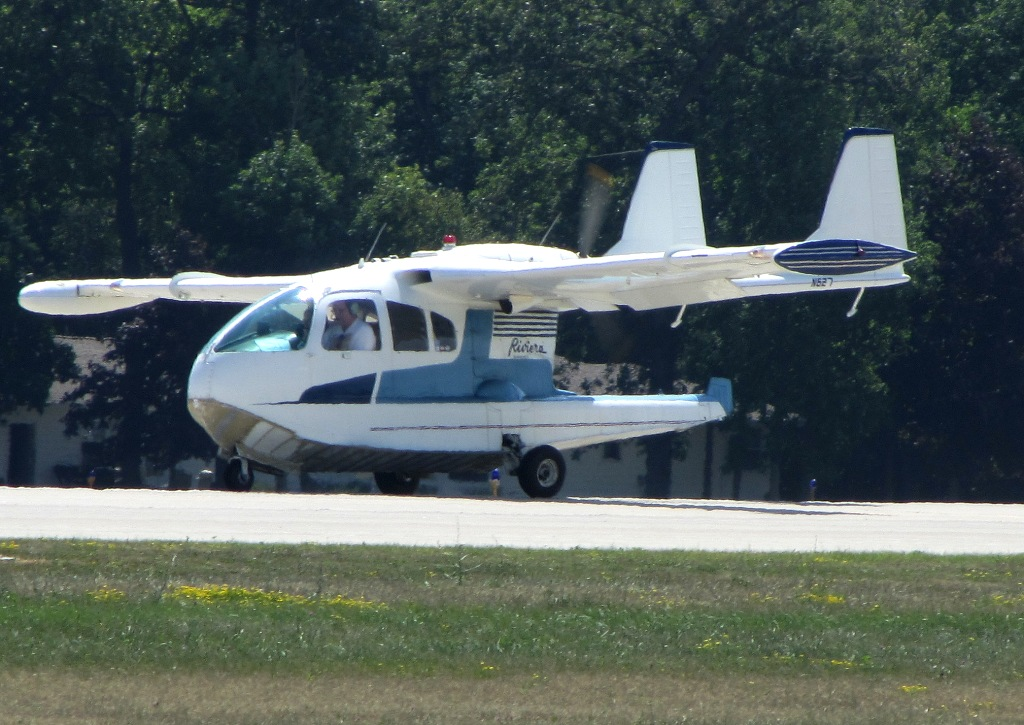
SIAI Marchetti FN 333 Riviera (1952)

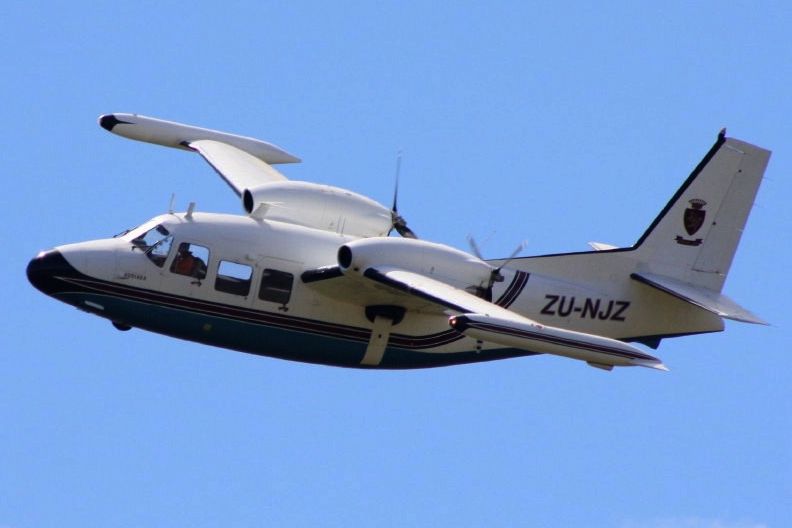
Piaggio P.166 (1957)

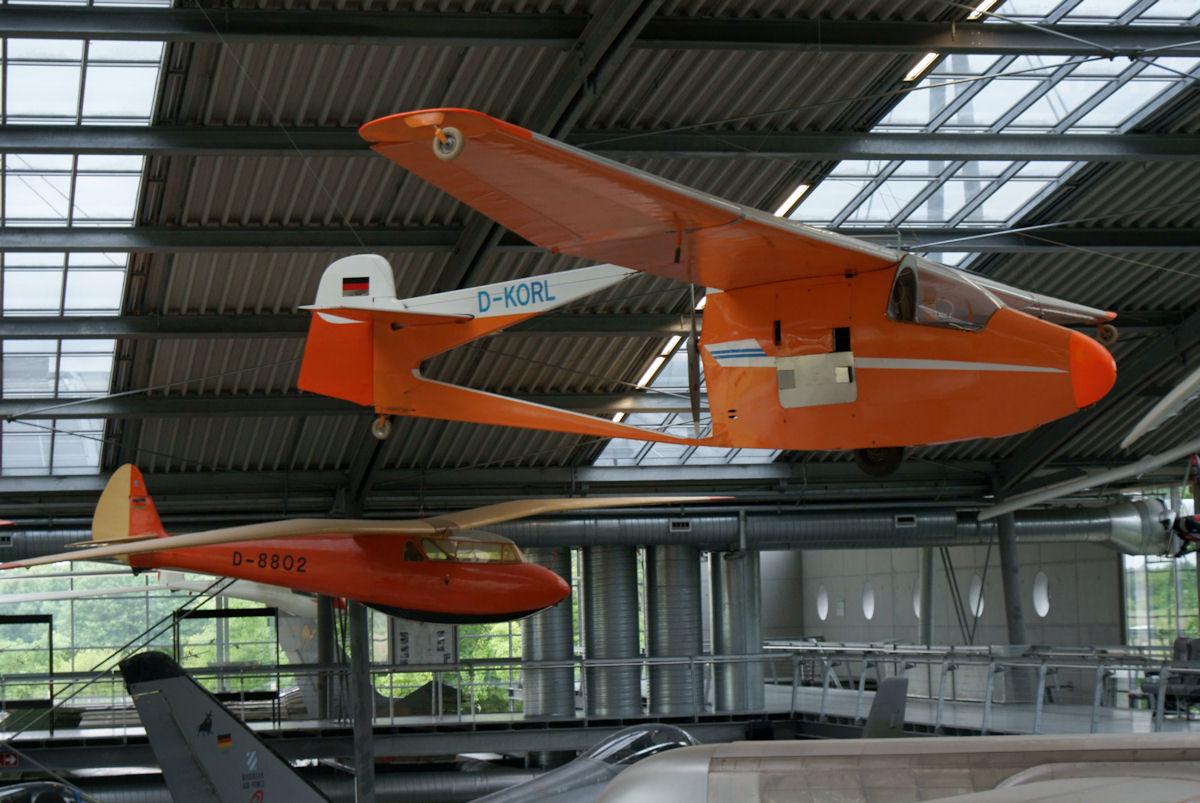
Raab Krähe (1958)

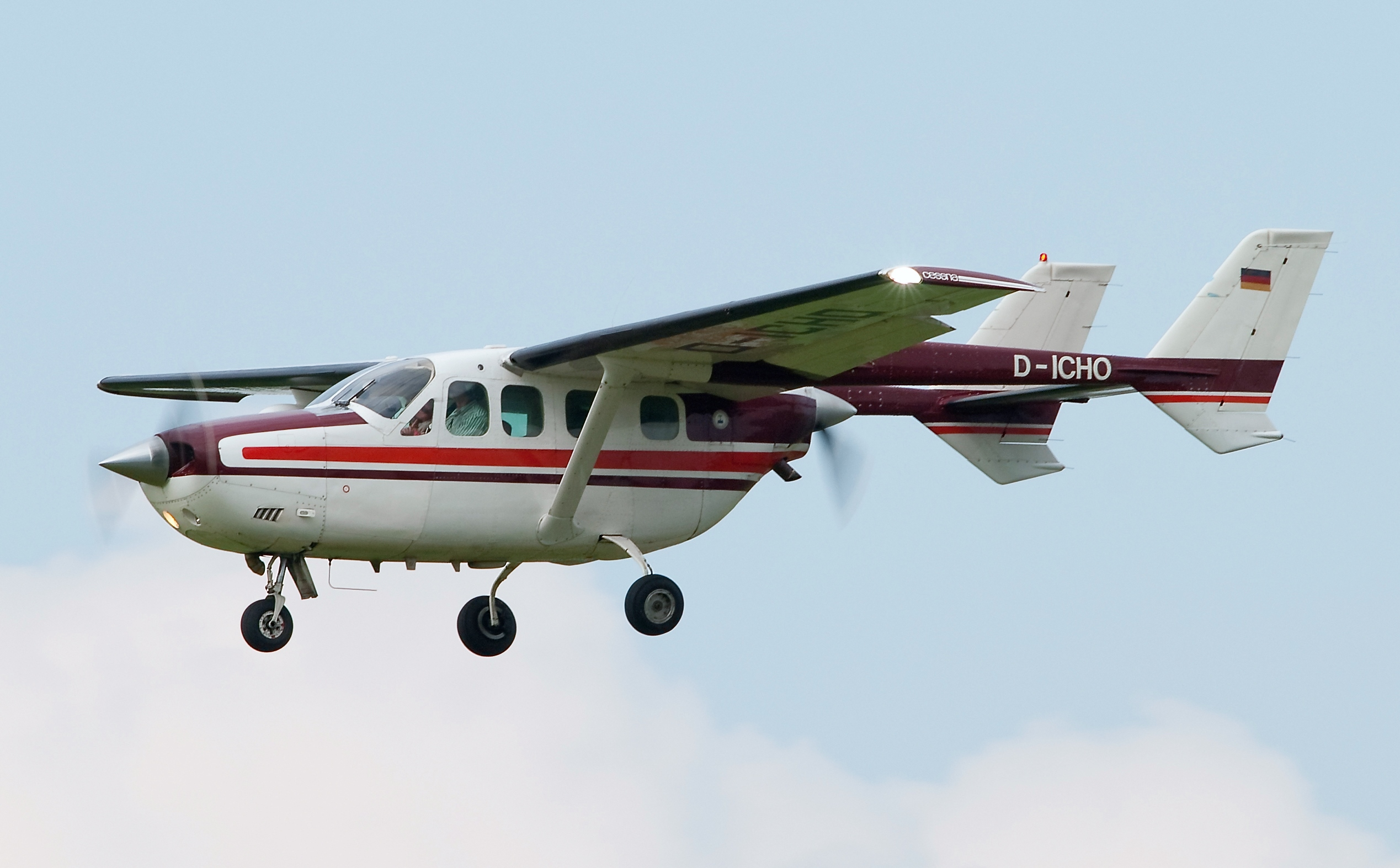
Cessna 337 Skymaster (1962)

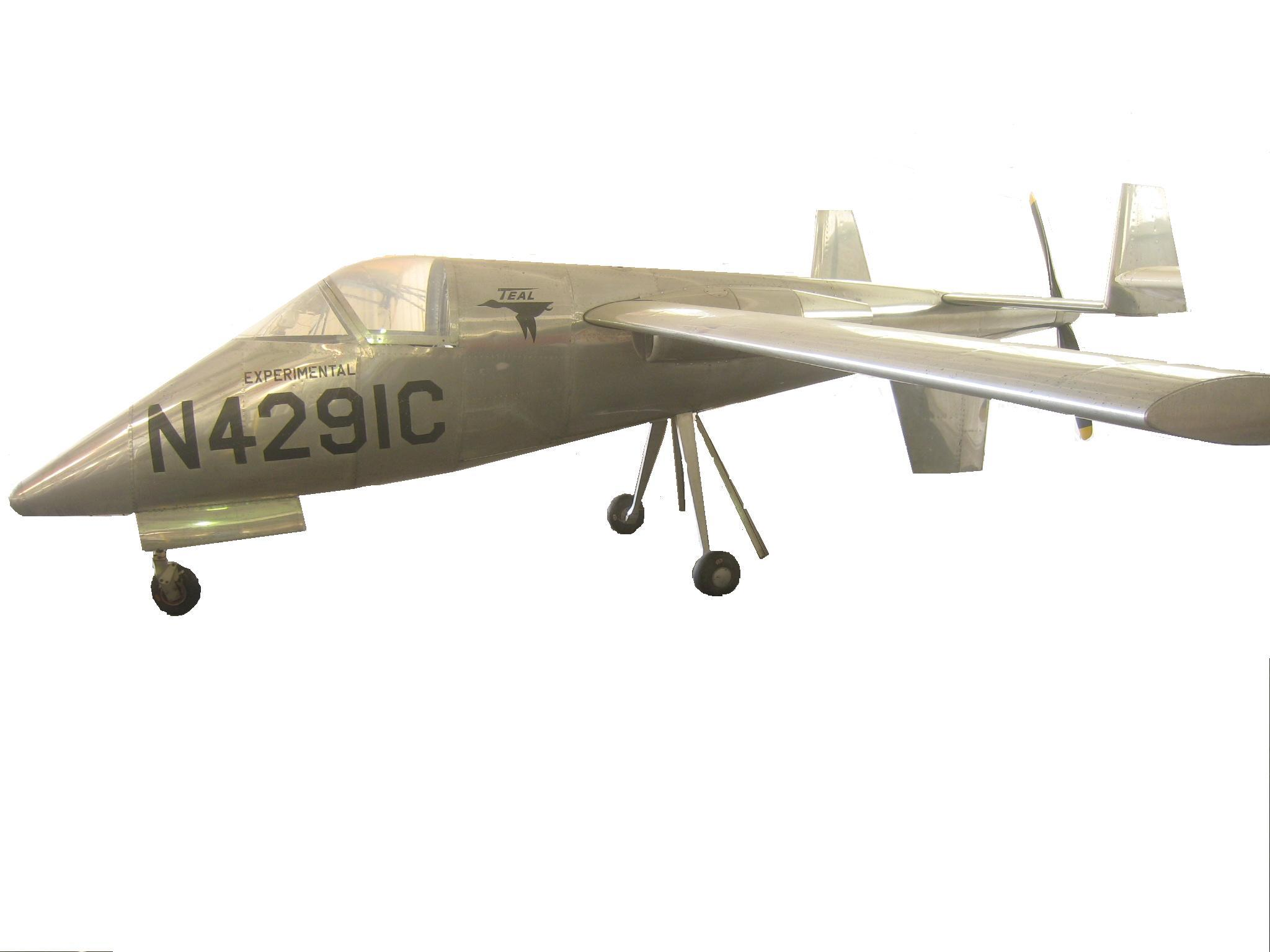
Lesher teal (1965)

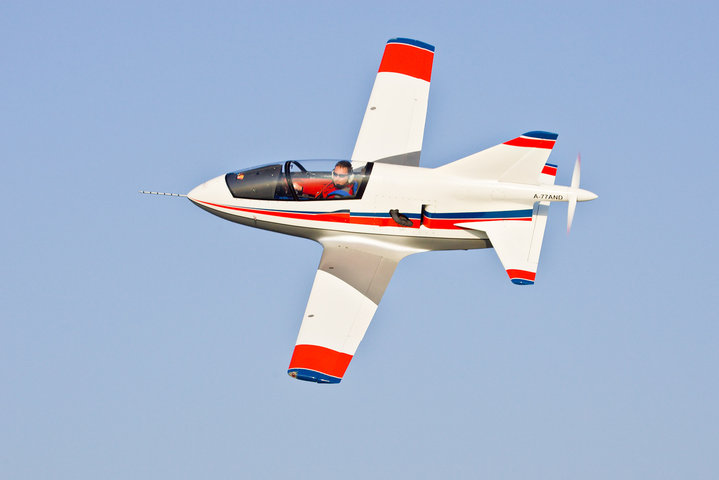
Bede BD-5 (1971)

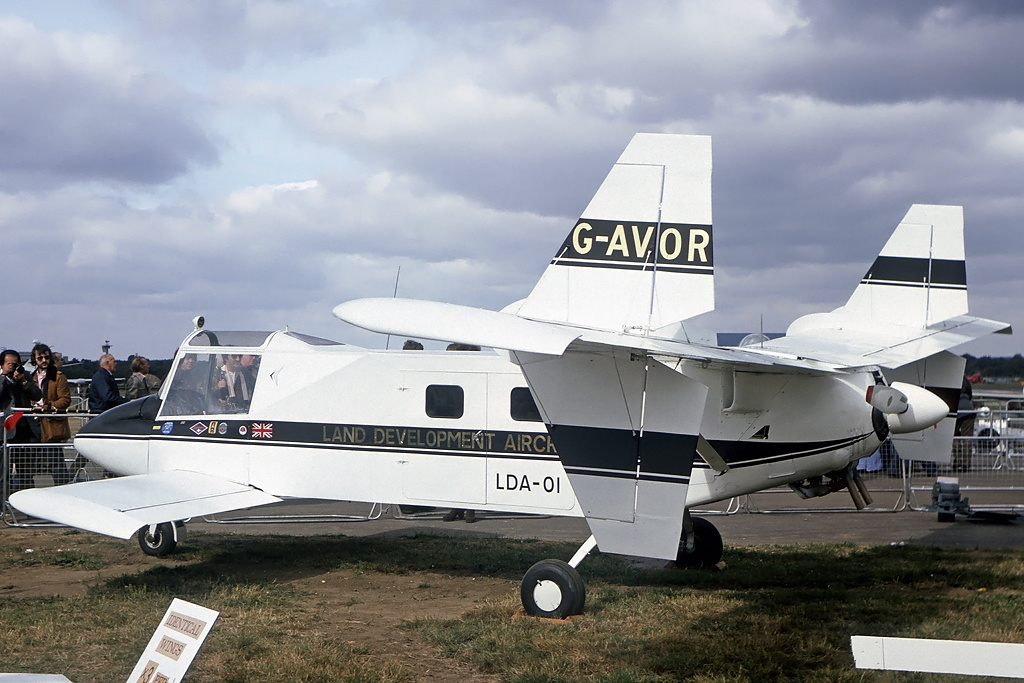
Lockspeiser LDA-1 (1971)

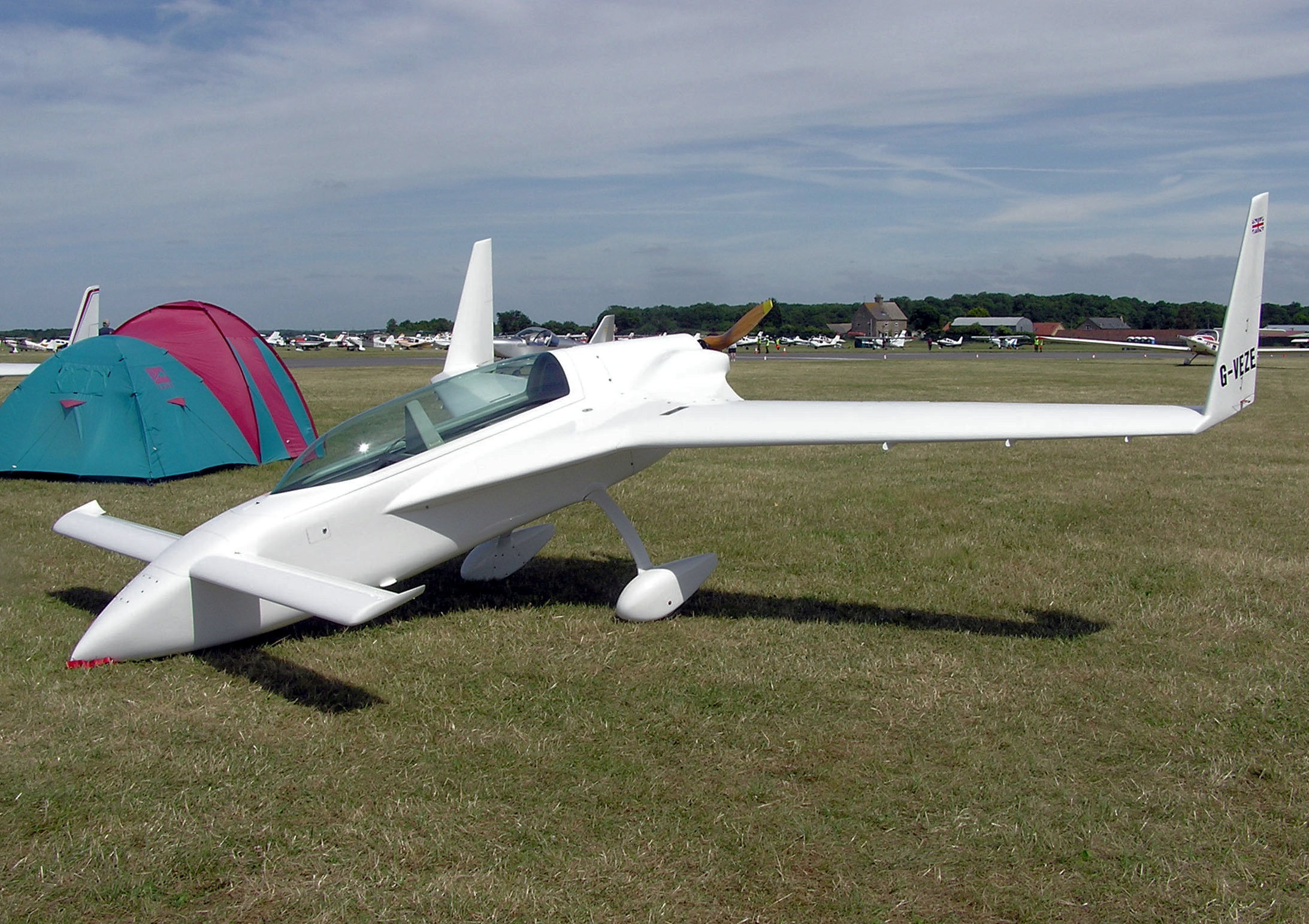
Rutan VariEze 1975

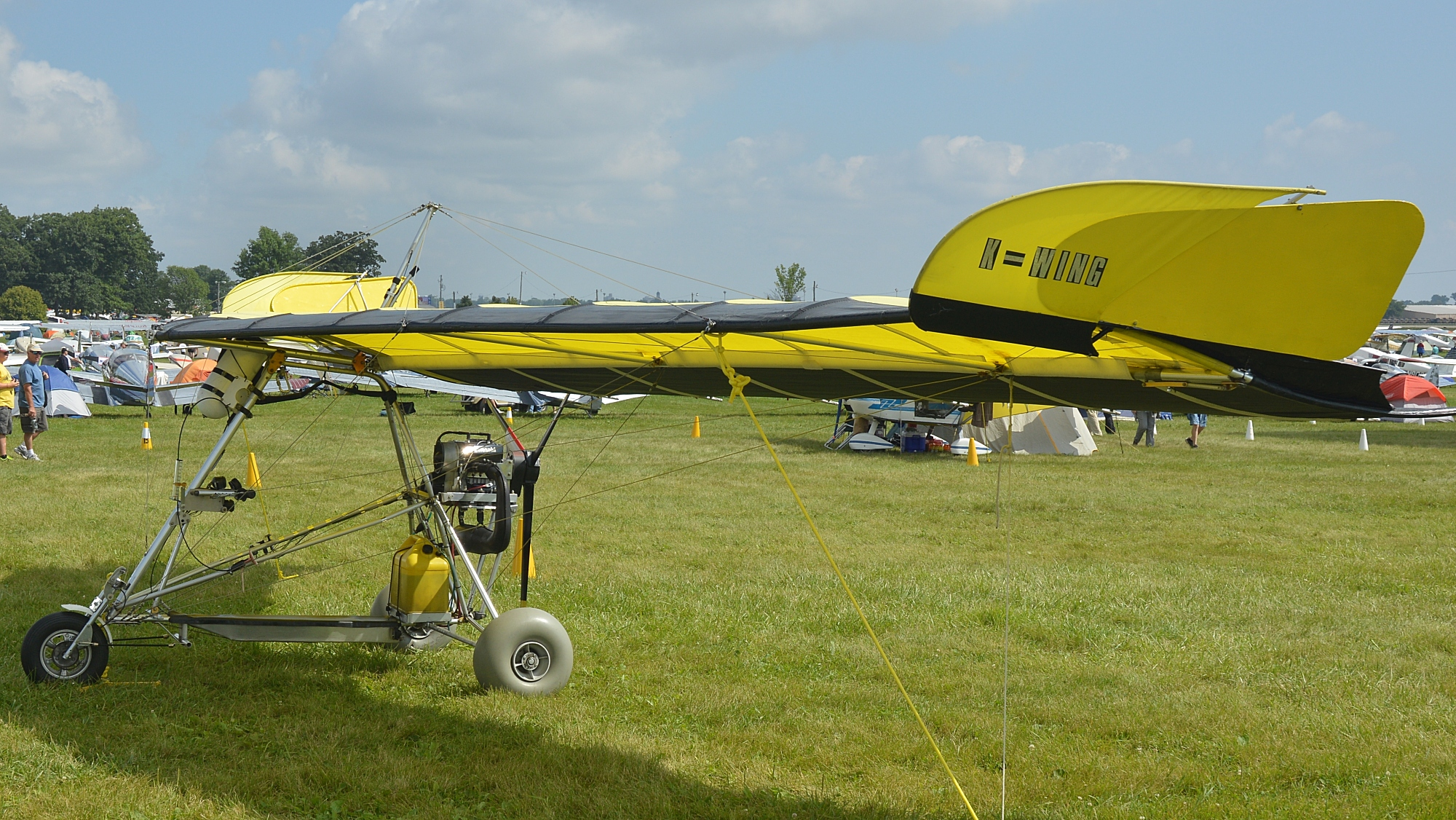
Cascade Kasperwing I-80 1976

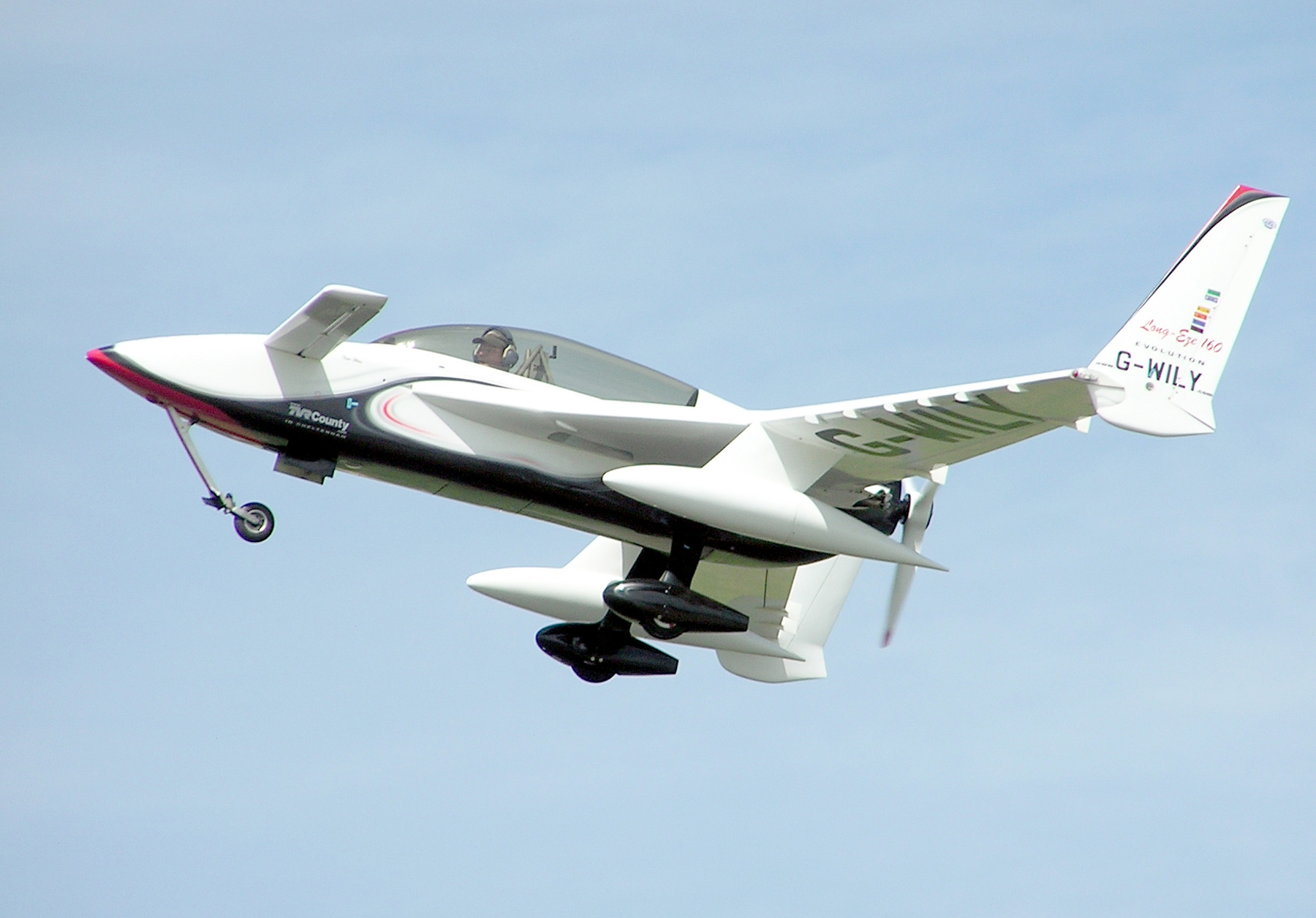
Rutan Long-EZ pusher configuration homebuilt aircraft.

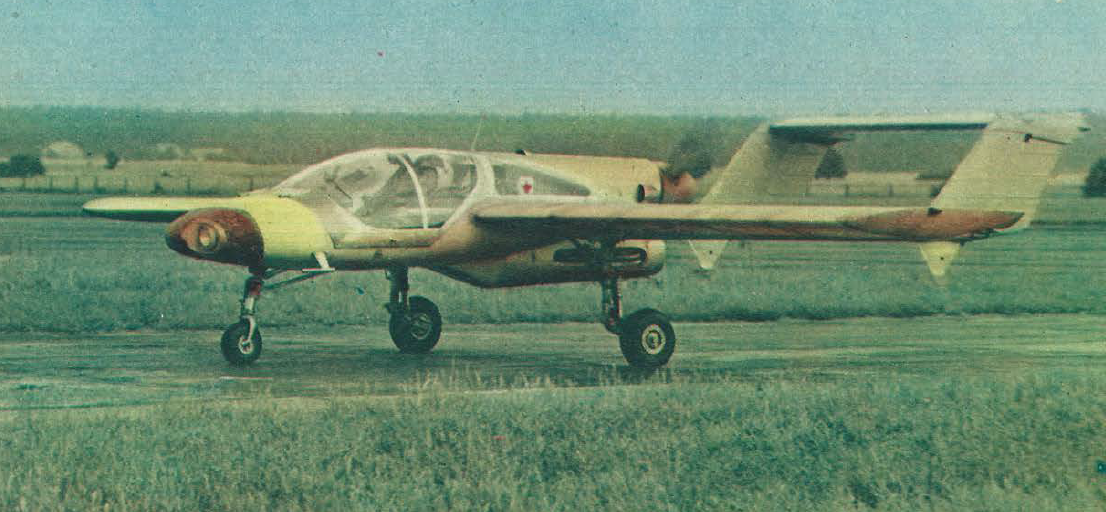
PZL M-17 (1977)

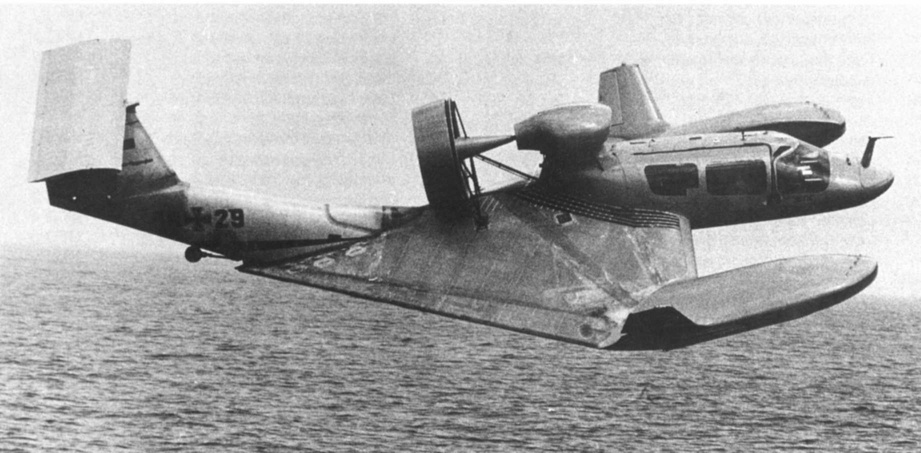
RFB X-114 (1977)

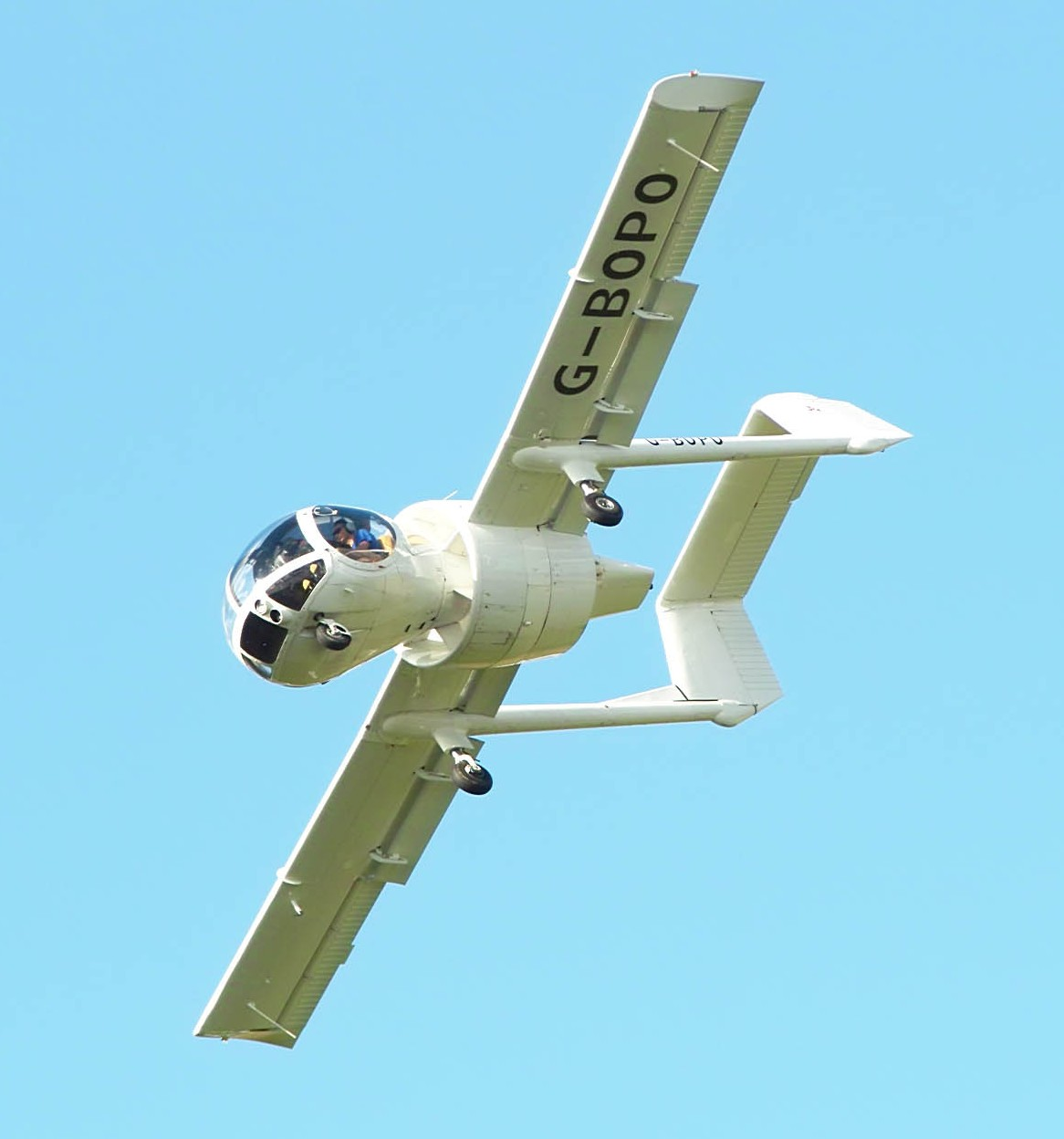
Edgley Optica (1979)

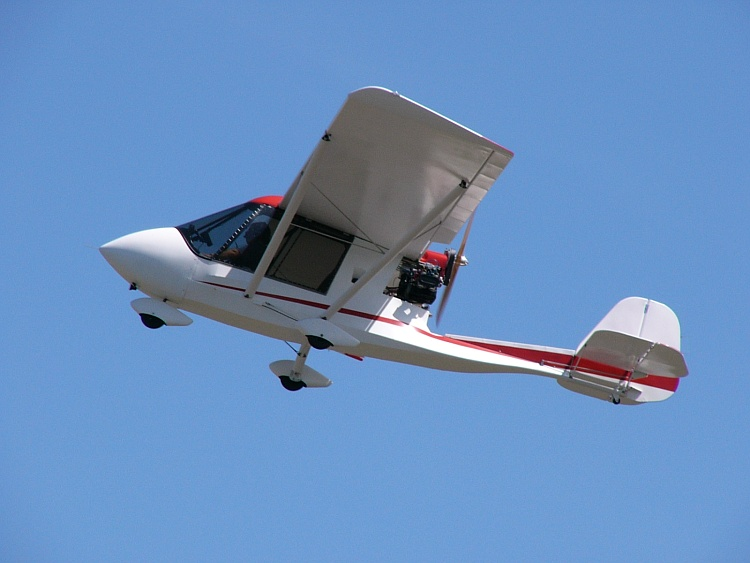
Quad City Challenger – a mid-engined pusher ultralight aircraft

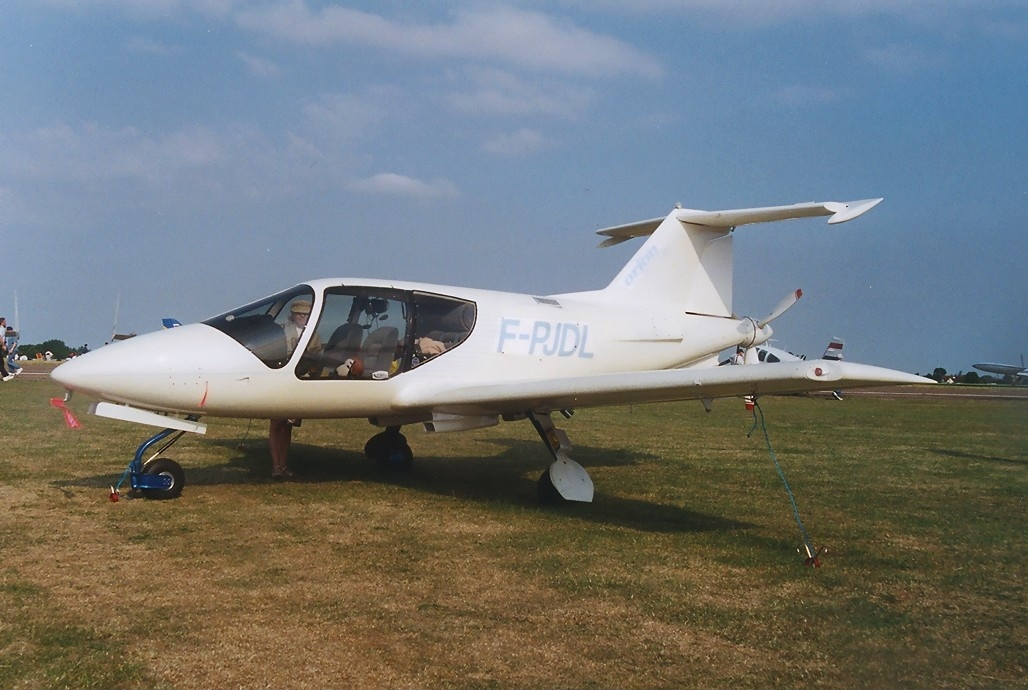
Grinvalds Orion (1981)

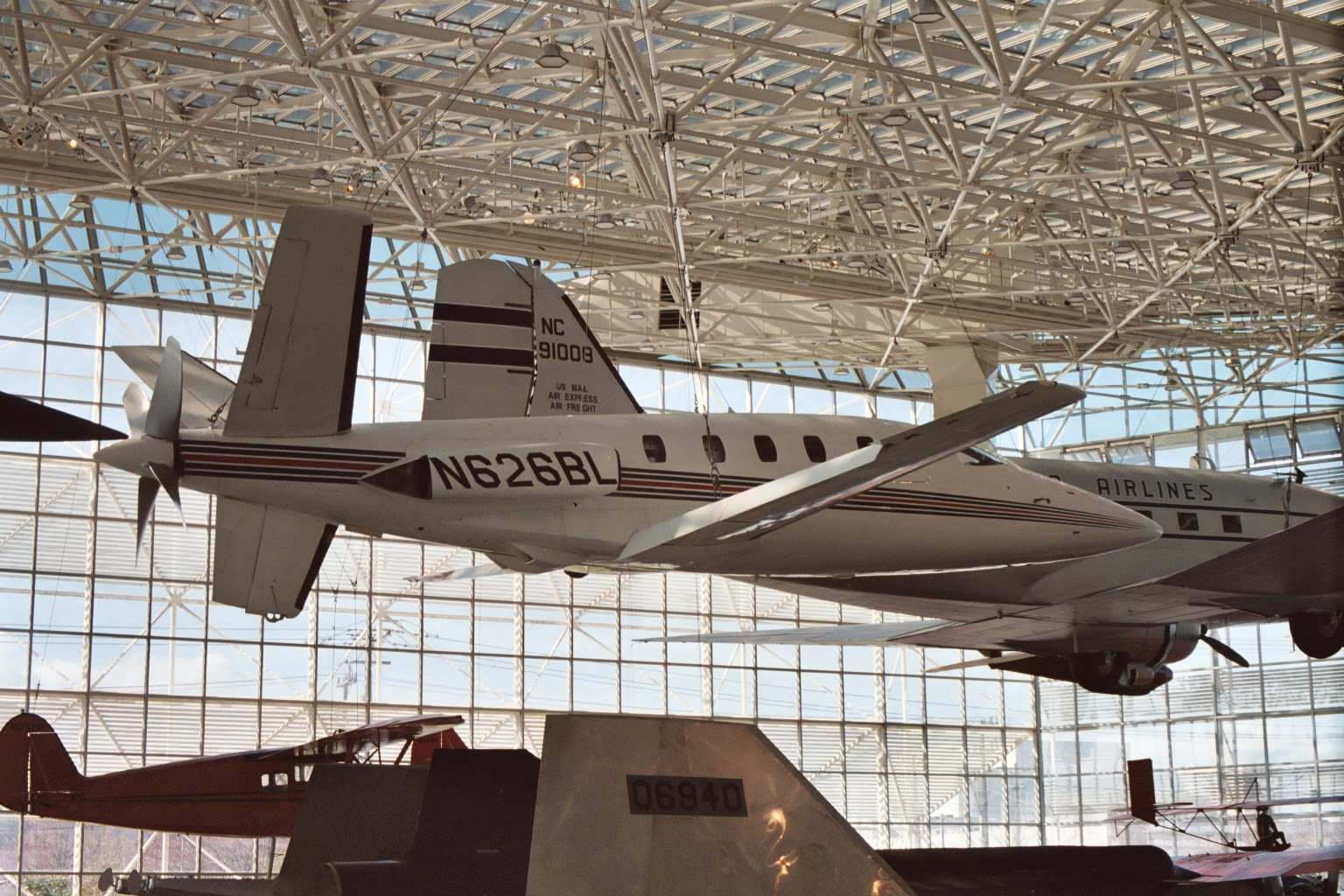
LearAvia Lear Fan (1981)

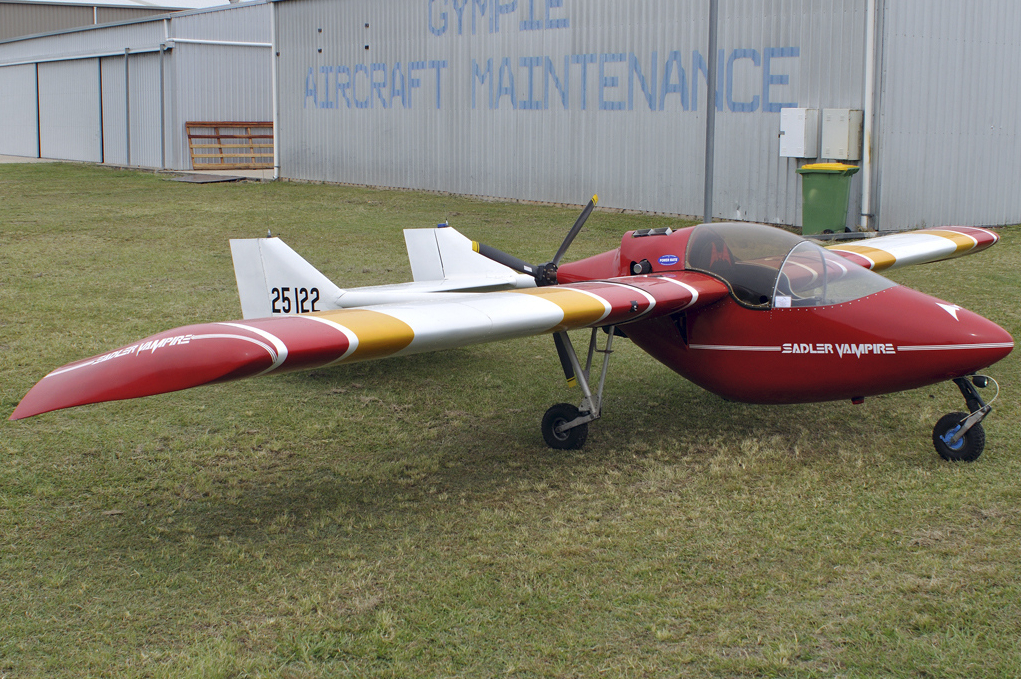
Sadler Vampire (1982)

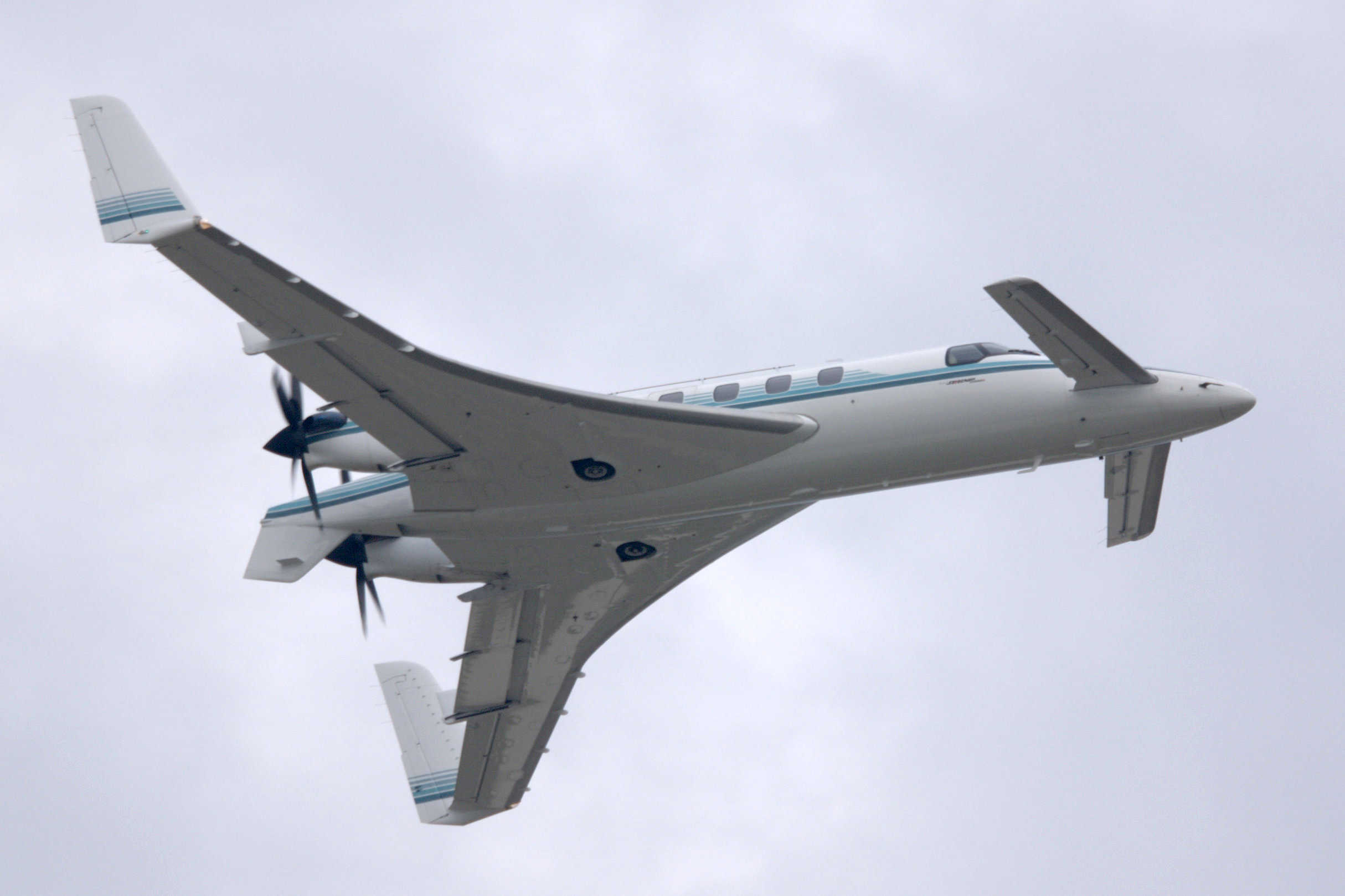
Beechcraft Starship (1983)

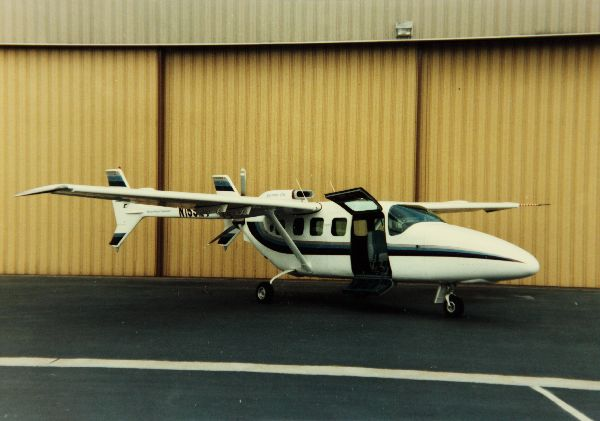
Spectrum SA-550 (1983)

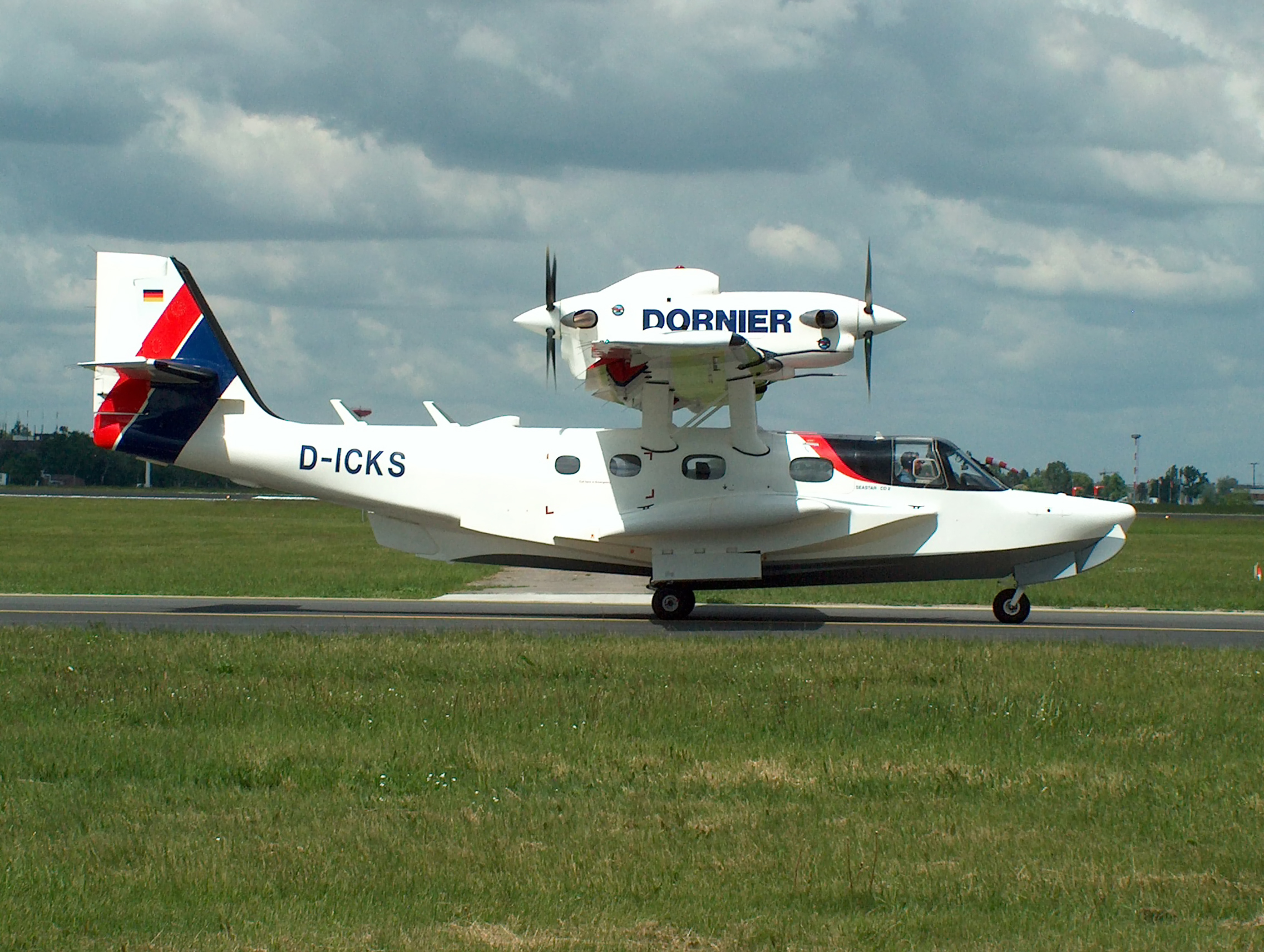
Dornier Seastar (1984)

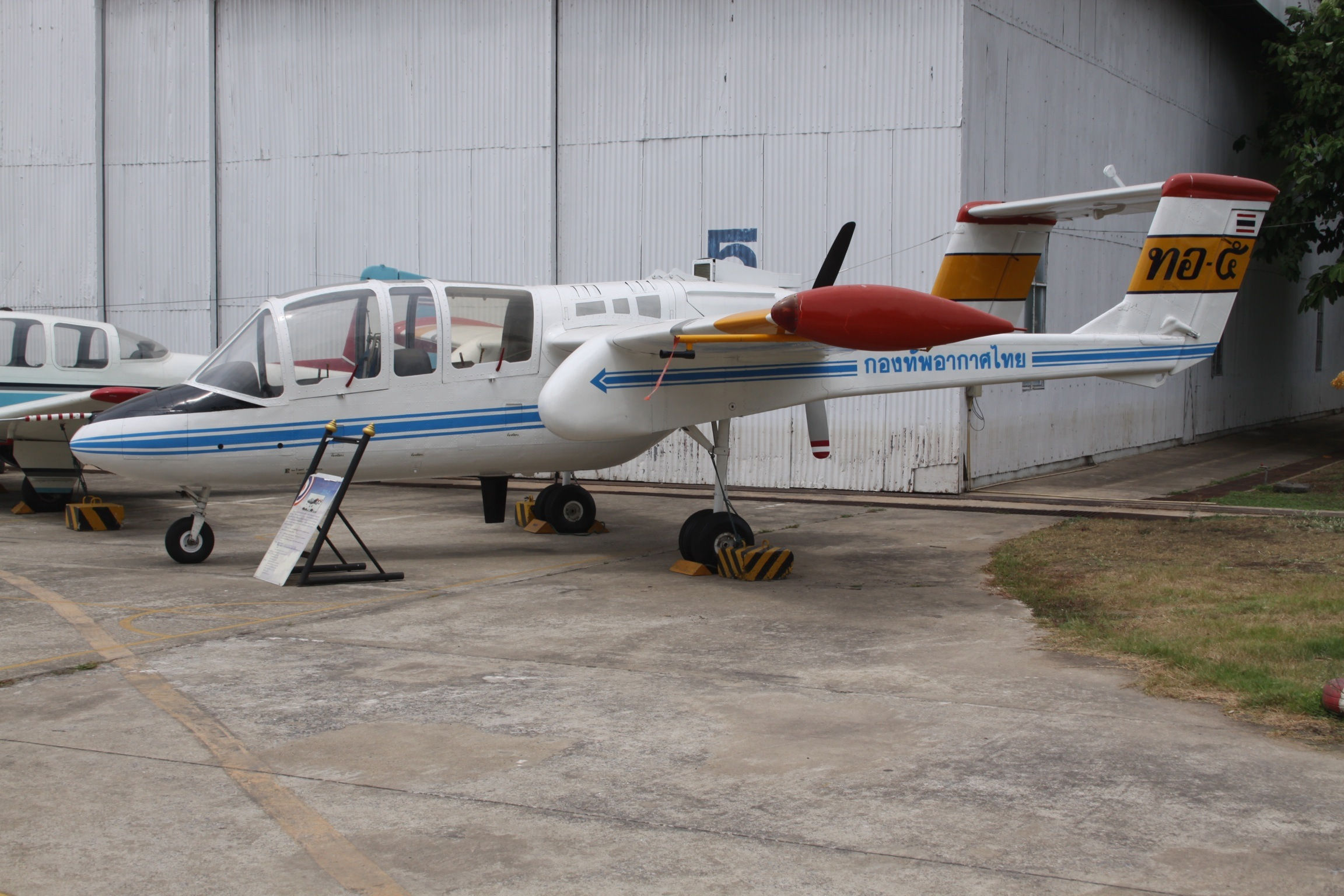
RTAF-5 (1984)

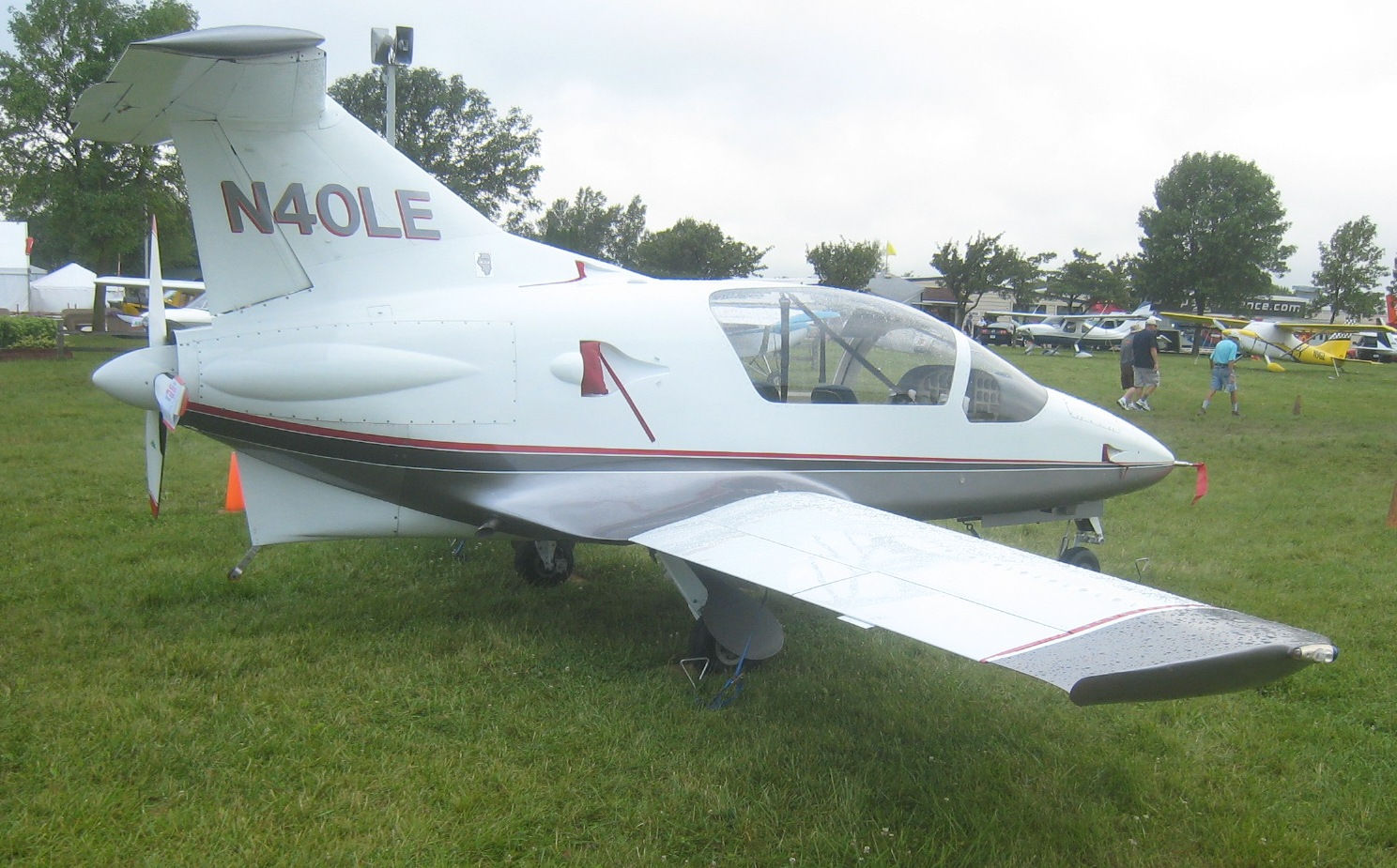
Prescott Pusher (1985)

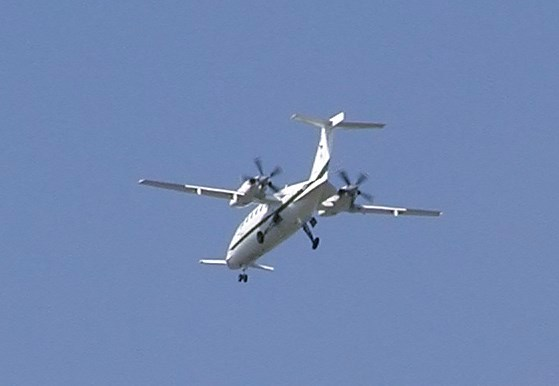
Piaggio P.180 Avanti (1986)

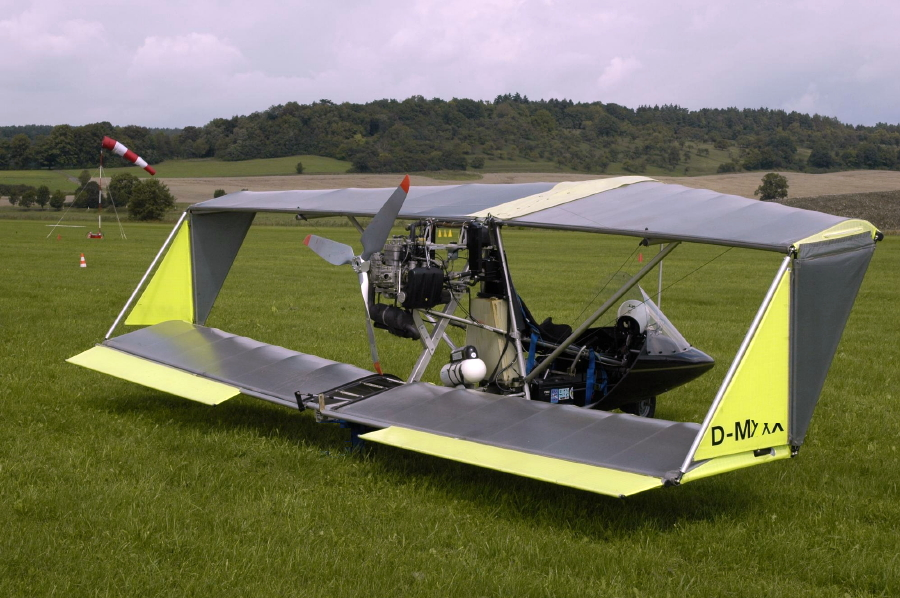
Airkraft Sunny joined wing 1989

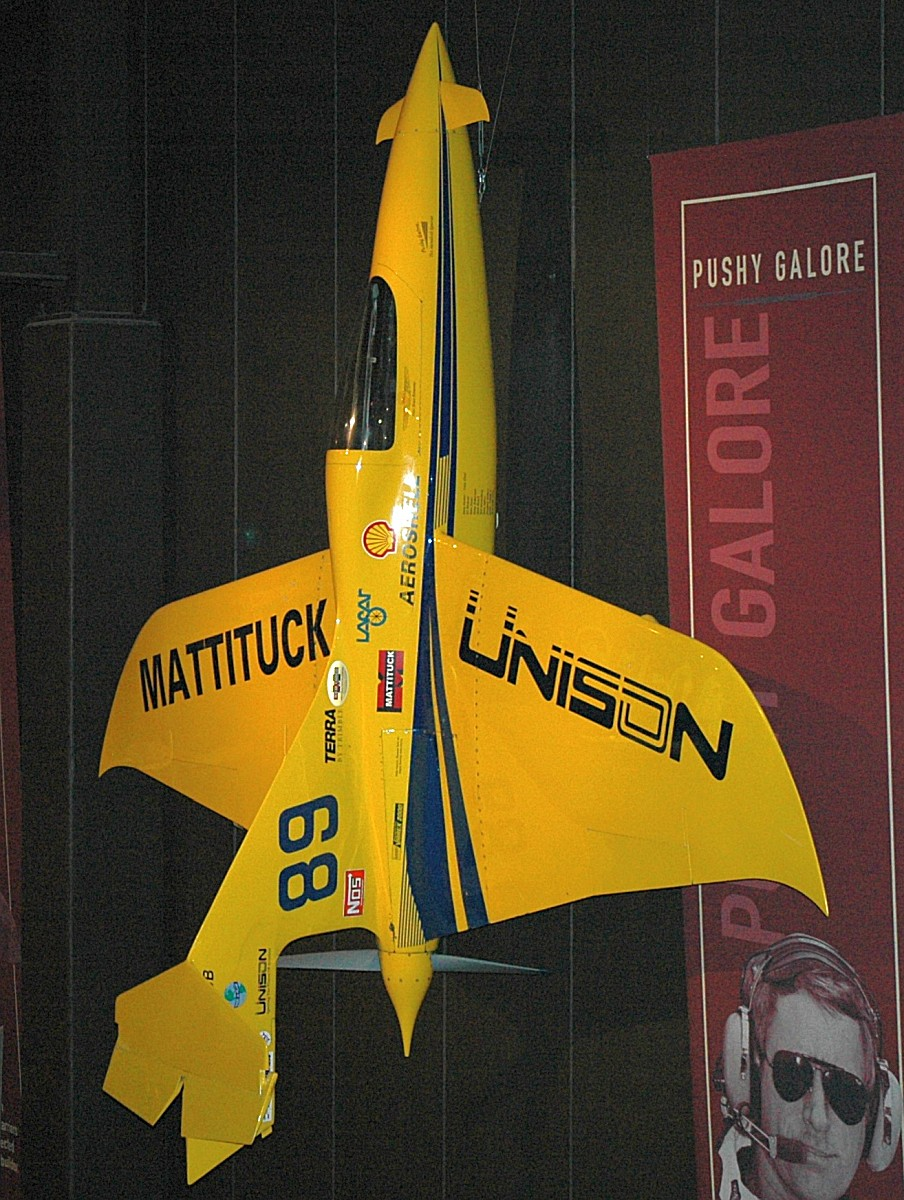
Miller-Bohannan JM-2 Special 1989

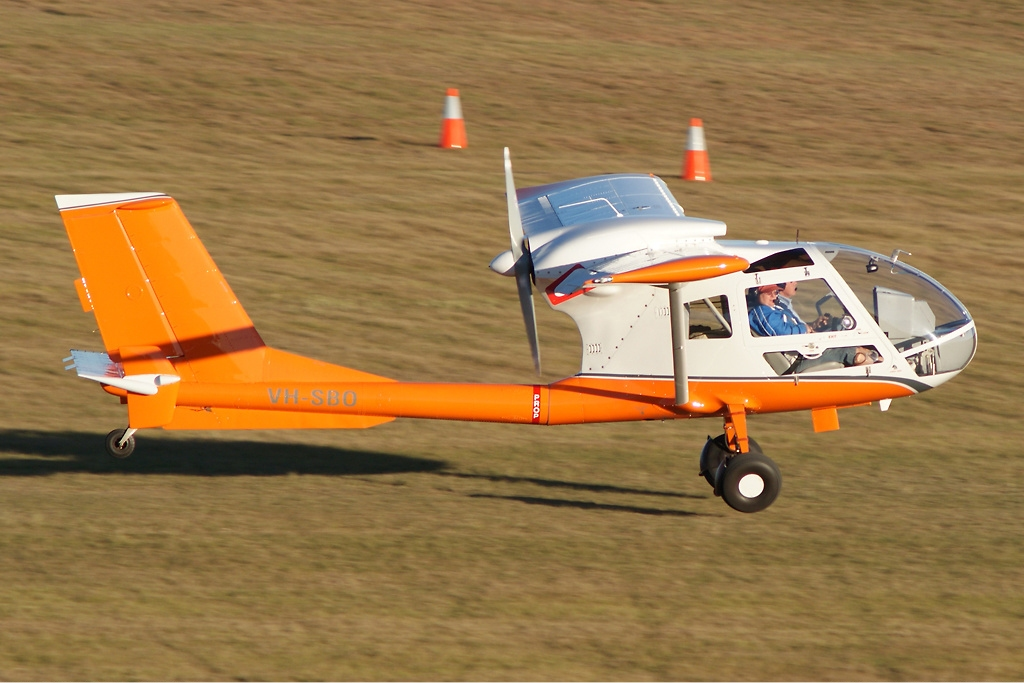
Seabird seeker (1989)

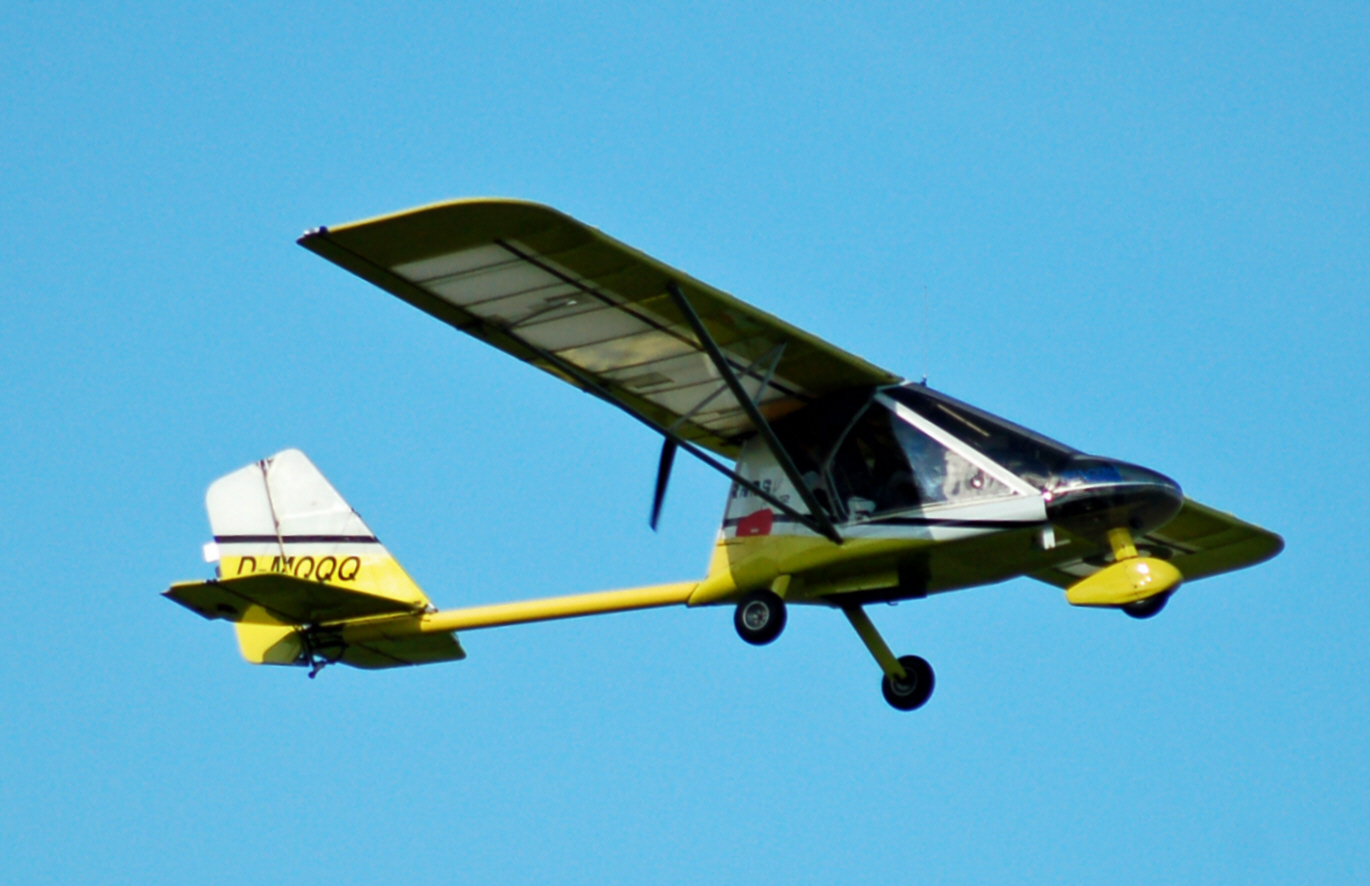
Rans S12 1990

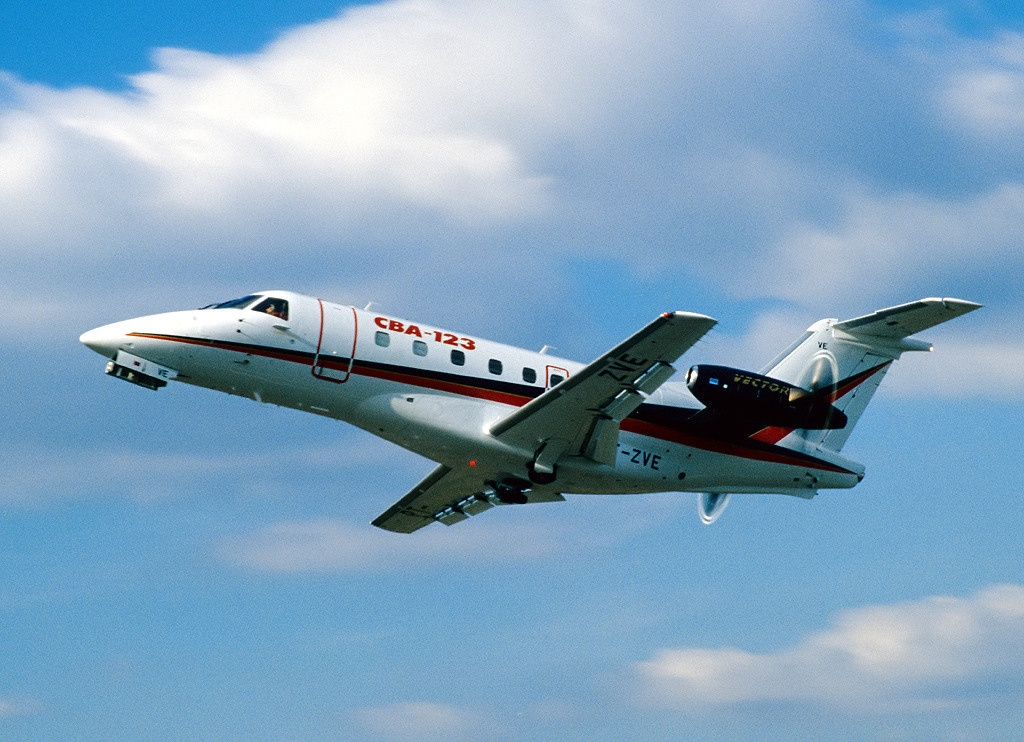
Embraer-FMA CBA-123 Vector

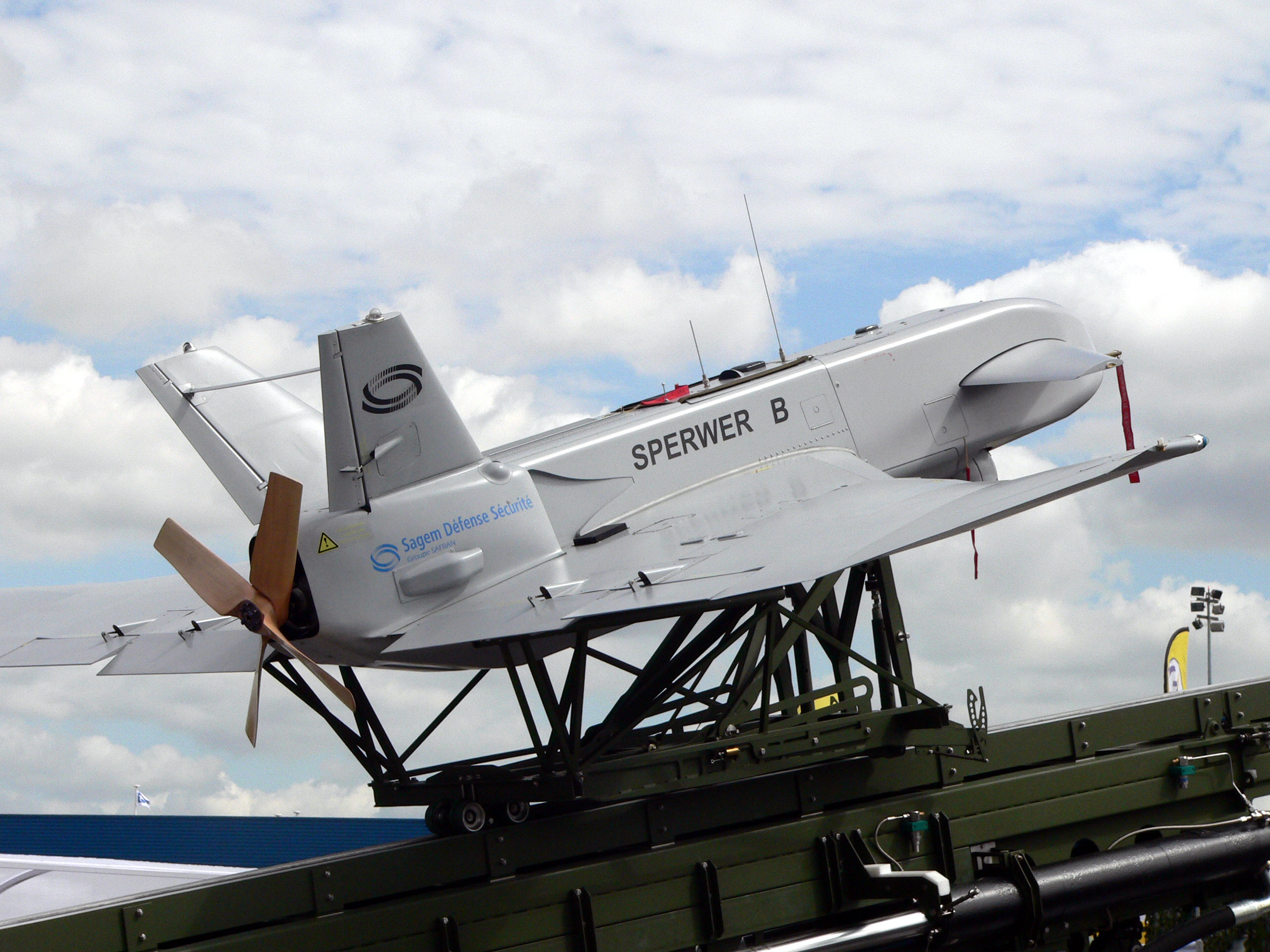
UAV SAGEM Sperwer B (1990s)

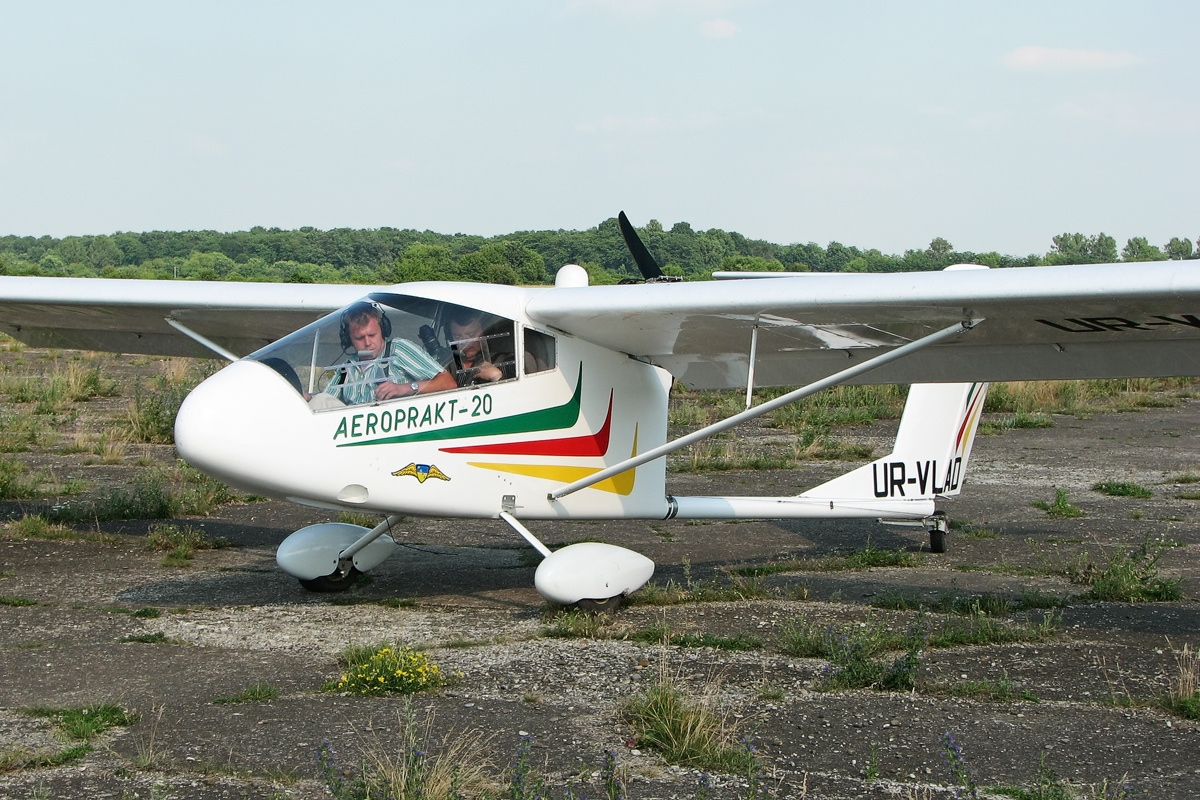
Aeroprakt A-20 Vista (1991

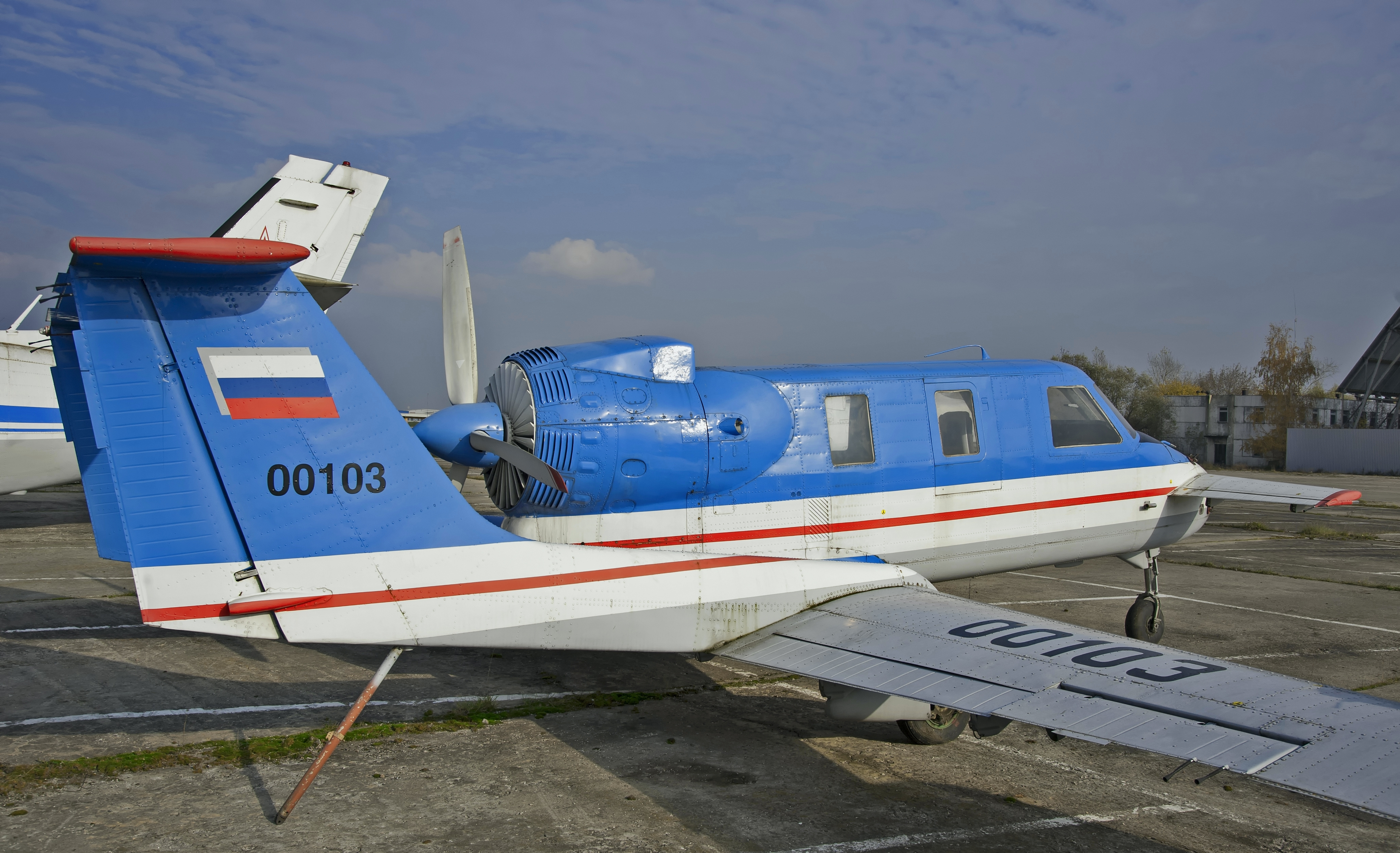
NPO Molniya (1993)

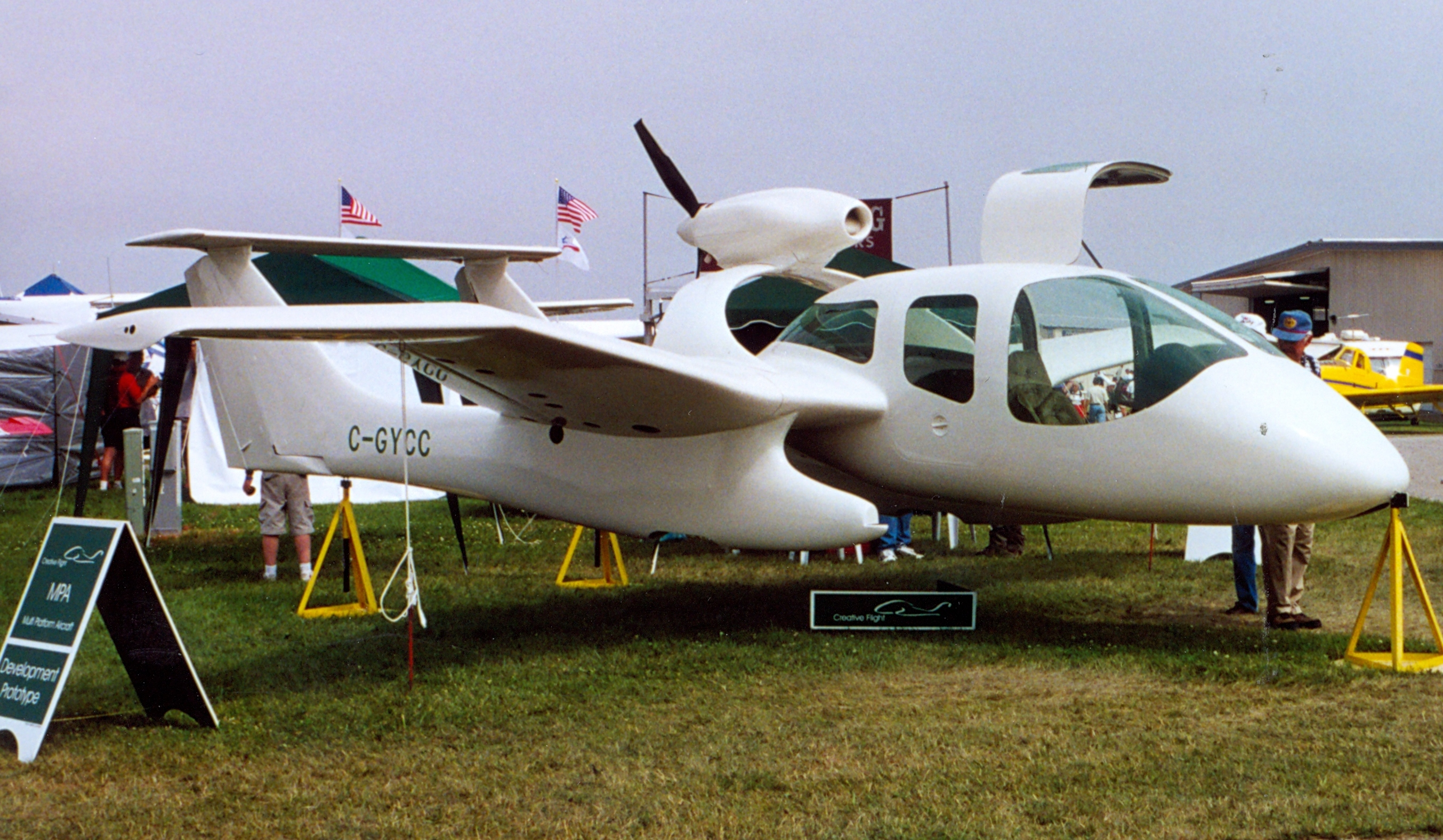
Creative Flight Aerocat (2001)

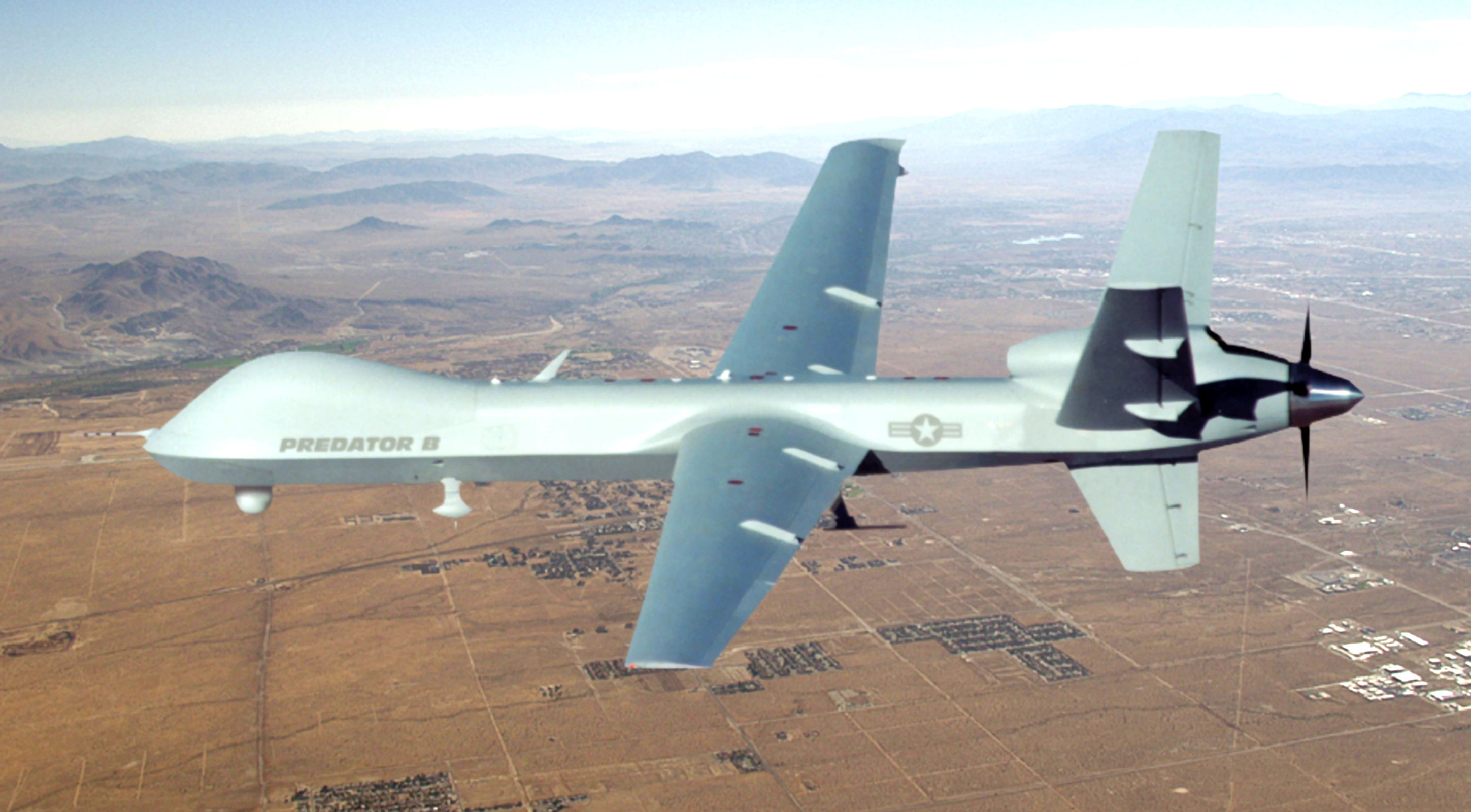
UCAV General Atomics MQ-9 Reaper (2001)

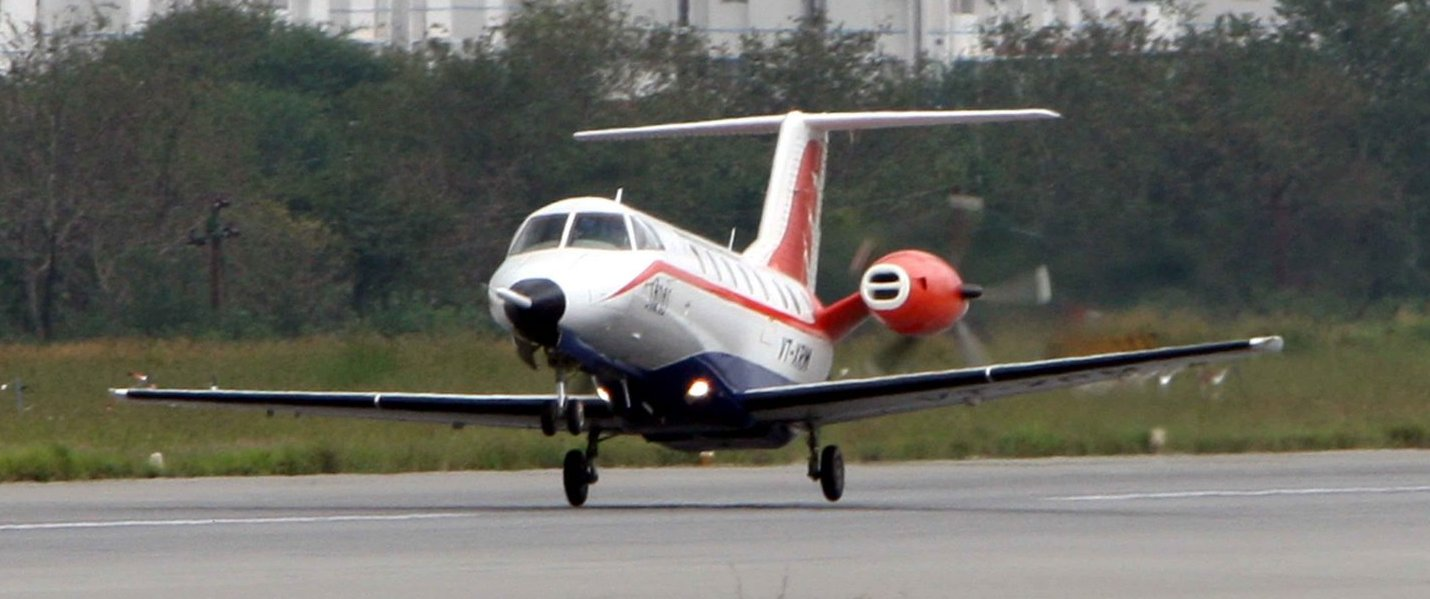
NAL Saras (2004)

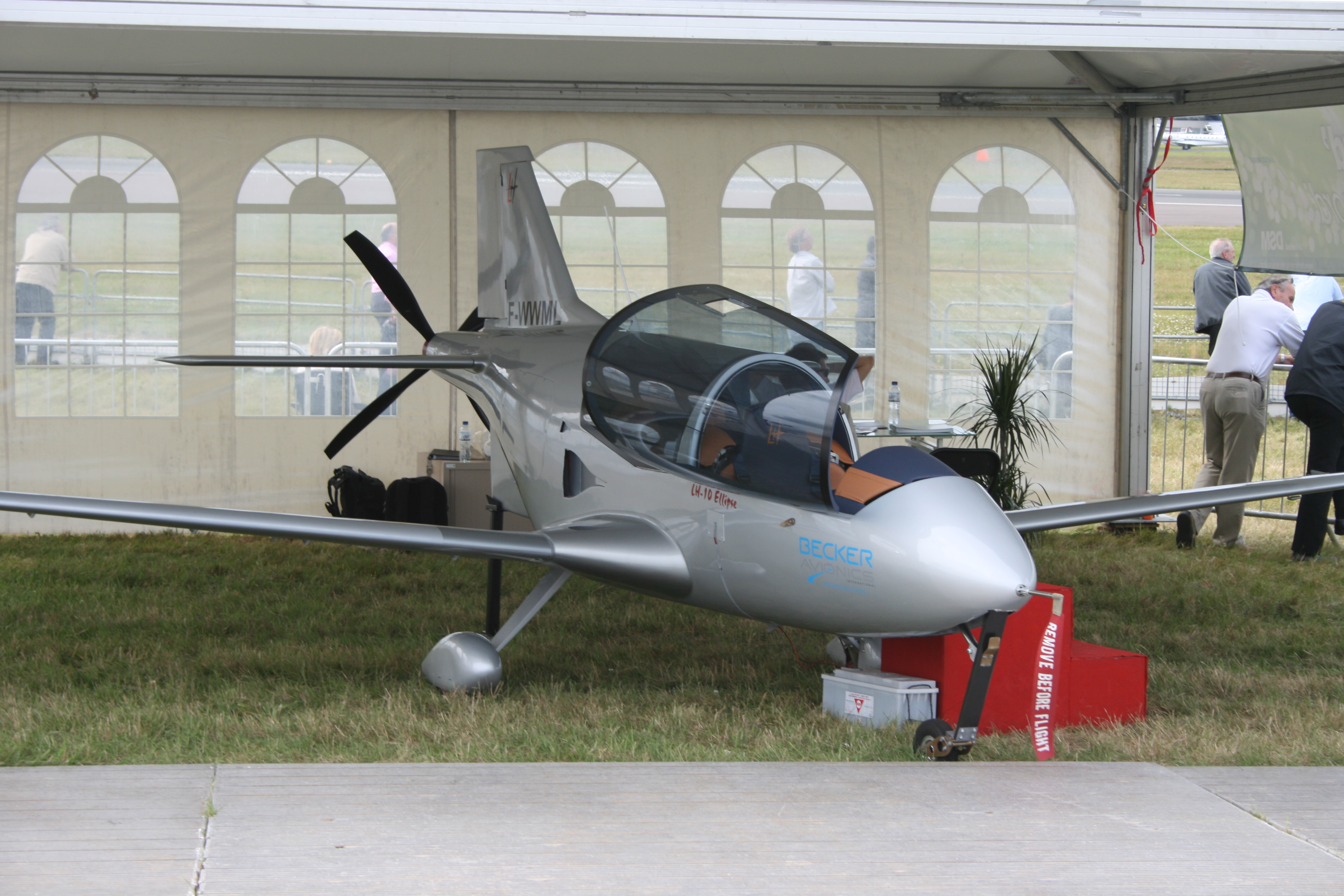
LH Aviation LH-10 Ellipse (2008)

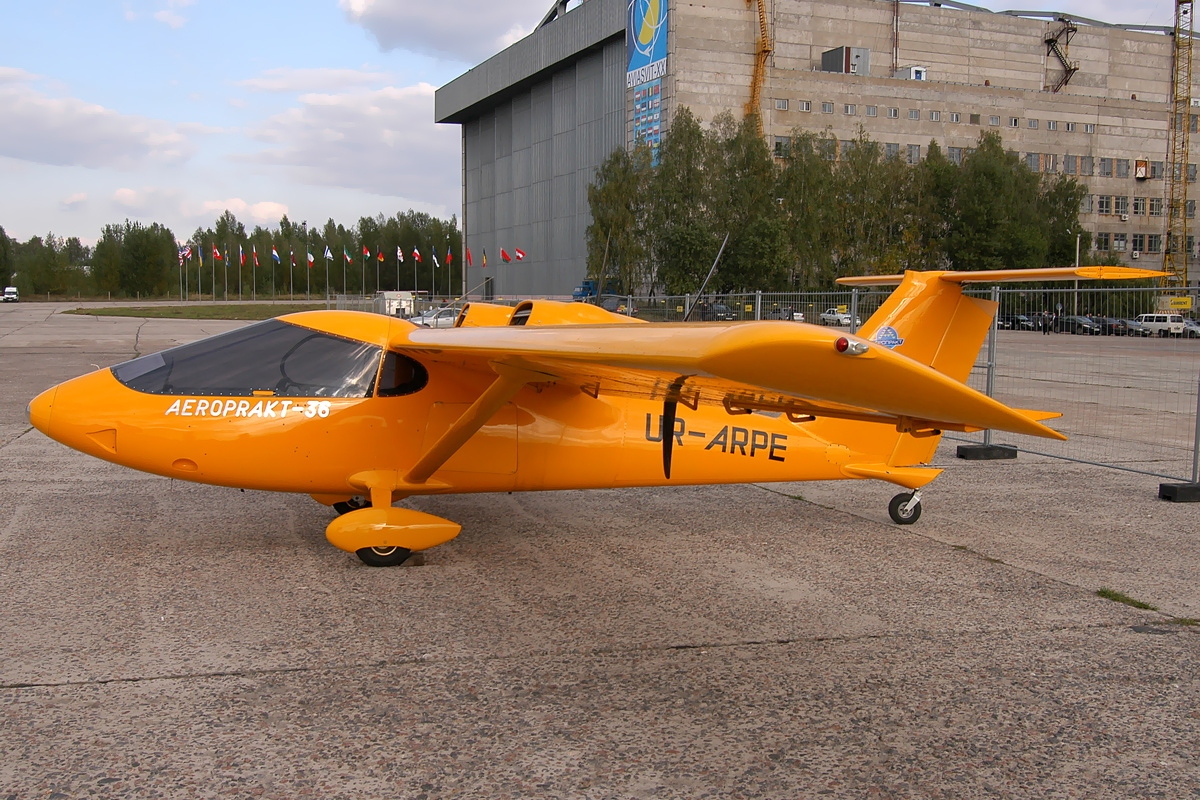
Aeroprakt A-36 (2011)

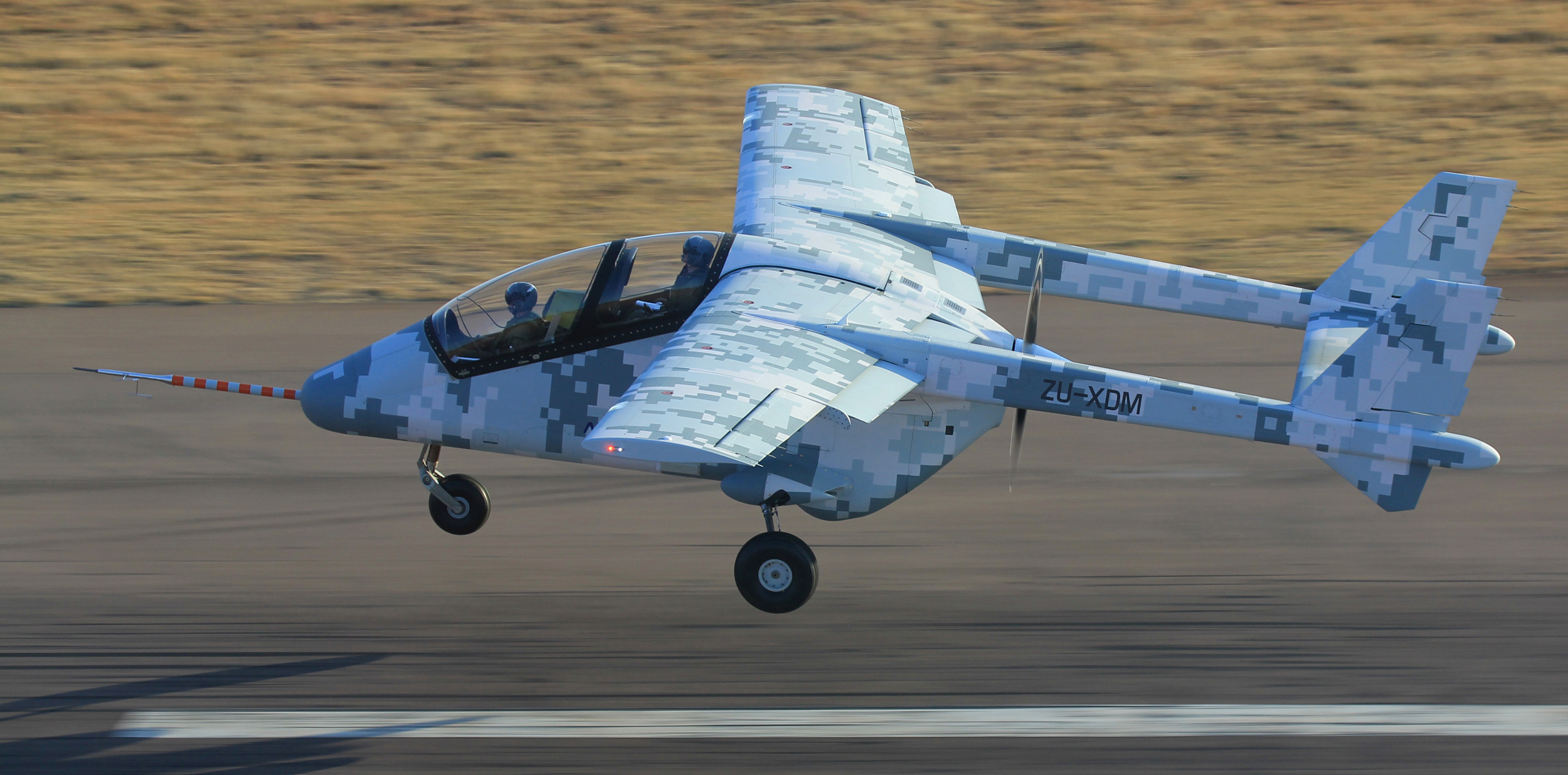
AHRLAC (2014)

- Voisin-Farman I 1907, 60 built
- AEA June Bug 1908 experimental, 1 built
- Cody British Army Aeroplane No 1 1908, 1 built
- AEA Silver Dart 1909, first flight in Canada, 1 built
- Curtiss No. 1 1909 Golden Flyer biplane, 1 built
- Curtiss No. 2 1909 Reims racer biplane, 1 built
- Cody Michelin Cup Biplane 1910, 1 built
- Bristol Boxkite 1910 trainer, 78 built
- Howard Wright 1910 Biplane 1910, 7 built
- Royal Aircraft Factory F.E.1 1910 biplane, 1 built
- Wright Model B 1910 biplane 2 seater, about 100 built
- Cody Circuit of Britain biplane 1911, 1 built
- Curtiss Model D 1911 biplane, 1 seat
- Curtiss Model E 1911 biplane floatplane, 17+ built
- Baldwin Red Devil 1911 aerobatic biplane, 6 built
- Farman MF.7 1911 biplane, unk no. built
- Cody V biplane 1912, 2 built
- Cody VI biplane/floatplane 1913, 1 built
- Short S.38 1912, 48 built
- Farman HF.20 1913 military biplane, unk no. built
- Farman MF.11 1913 biplane, unk no. built
- Grahame-White Type X Charabanc 1913 transport, 1 built
- Short S.80 Nile Pusher Biplane Seaplane 1913, 1 built
- Grahame-White Type XV 1913 trainer, 135 built
- Sopwith Bat Boat 1913, 6 built

===== Between frames or booms (1915 and later) =====
- Breguet Bre.4 1914 2 seat military biplane, about 100 built
- Grahame-White Type XI 1914 reconnaissance biplane, 1 built
- Short S.81 1914, 1 built
- Sopwith Gunbus 1914, 35 built (including floatplanes)
- Vickers F.B.5 1914, 224 built
- Voisin III 1914 bomber, about 3200 built
- Wight Pusher Seaplane 1914, 11 built
- Breguet Bre.5 1915 2 seat military biplane, unk no. built
- AD Scout 1915 interceptor, 4 built
- AGO C.II 1915 reconnaissance biplane, 15 built
- Airco DH.1 1915 biplane, 2 seat, 100 built,
- Airco DH.2 1915 biplane fighter, 453 built
- Avro 508 1915, 1 built
- Farman F.30 1915 military biplane, unk no. built
- Farman F.40 1915 military biplane, unk no. built
- Otto C.I 1915 reconnaissance biplane, unk no. built
- Pemberton-Billing P.B.25 1915 scout, 20 built
- Royal Aircraft Factory F.E.2 1915 military biplane, 1939 built
- Royal Aircraft Factory F.E.8 1915 biplane fighter, 295 built
- Voisin IV
- Voisin V 1915 bomber, about 350 built
- Breguet Bre.12 1916 2 seat military biplane, unk no. built
- Friedrichshafen FF.34 1916 patrol seaplane, 1 built
- Häfeli DH-1 1916 reconnaissance biplane, 6 built
- Vickers F.B.12 1916 fighter, about 22 built
- Voisin VII 1916 reconnaissance biplane, about 100 built
- Voisin VIII 1916 bomber, about 1,100 built
- Blackburn Triplane 1917 fighter, 1 built
- Curtiss Autoplane 1917 (hops only) roadable aircraft, 1 built
- Port Victoria P.V.4 1917 floatplane, 1 built.
- Royal Aircraft Factory F.E.9 1917 2 seat fighter, 3 built
- Royal Aircraft Factory N.E.1 1917 night fighter, 6 built
- Savoia-Pomilio SP.3 1917 reconnaissance biplane about 350 built
- Vickers F.B.26 Vampire 1917, 4 built
- Voisin IX 1917 reconnaissance biplane, 1 built
- Voisin X 1917 bomber, about 900 built
- Vickers VIM 1920, 35 built

===== Between booms =====
- Henderson H.S.F.1 1929 transport, 1 built
- Campbell Model F 1930 private airplane, 1 built
- Hanriot H.110 1933 fighter, 1 built
- Stearman-Hammond Y-1 1934 safety airplane about 20 built
- de Schelde Scheldemusch 1935 1 seat biplane trainer, 6 built
- ITS-8 1936 motorglider monoplane, 2 built
- SCAL FB.30 Avion Bassou 1936 2 seat light aircraft, 2 built
- Abrams P-1 Explorer 1937, 1 built
- SAIMAN LB.2 1937 2 seat monoplane, 1 built
- Alliet-Larivière Allar 4, 1938 experimental 2 seat, 1 built
- General Aircraft GAL.33 Cagnet 1939 trainer, 1 built
- WNF Wn 16 1939, Austrian experimental aircraft
- General Aircraft GAL.47 1940 observation, 1 built
- de Schelde S.21 1940 fighter mockup (unflown)Dieselpunk: De Schelde S.21
- Fane F.1/40 1941 observation monoplane, 1 built
- Saab 21 1943 fighter, 298 built
- Vultee XP-54 1943 fighter, 2 built
- Skoda-Kauba V6 1944 1 seat, 1 built

1945 and later

- Convair 106 Skycoach 1946 4 seater, one built
- Fokker F.25 1946 4 seater, 20 built
- SECAN Courlis 1946 transport, unk no. built
- Anderson Greenwood AG-14 1947 2 seat experimental, 6 built
- Heston JC.6/AOP 1947 2 seat reconnaissance, 2 built
- Alaparma Baldo 1949 1 seat, about 35 built
- SNCASO SO.8000 Narval 1949 naval fighter, 2 built
- Anderson Greenwood AG-14 1950 2 seats, 6 built
- SIAI-Marchetti FN.333 Riviera 1952 amphibie 4 seater, 29 built
- Potez 75 1953 reconnaissance, 1 built
- SIAI-Marchetti FN.333 Riviera 1962 4 seat amphibian, 29 built
- Akaflieg Stuttgart FS-26 Moseppl 1970 1 seat powered sailplane, unk no. built
- Cessna XMC 1971 research aircraft, 1 built
- Akaflieg Stuttgart FS-28 Avispa 1972 2 seat transport, 1 built
- Kortenbach & Rauh Kora 1973 Motor glider, 2 built
- Lartin Skylark 1973 Utility Prototype
- PZL M-17 1973 Trainer Prototype
- Edgley Optica 1979 ducted fan observation aircraft 21 built

1980 and later

- ADI Condor 1981 2 seat motorglider, unk no. built
- Acapella 200 1982 homebuilt, 1 built
- Applebay Zia 1982 1 seat ultralight motorglider, 4 built
- Sadler Vampire 1982 Ultralight
- Spectrum SA-550 1983 Utility prototype, 2 built
- RTAF-5 1984 Trainer prototype
- Aero Dynamics Sparrow Hawk Mk.II 1984 Experimental 2 seater
- NPO Molniya 1993 transport 6 seater, 2 built
- Yakovlev Yak-58 1993 Utility, 7 built
- HFL Stratos 300 1996 1 seat ultralight motorglider
- NPP Aerorik Dingo 1997 multi-role amphibian (air cushion), 6 built
- Toucan PJ-1B 1998 experimental 1 seat, one built
- Creative Flight Aerocat 2001 Transport Prototype
- Airsport Song 2009 ultralight
- Northrop Grumman Firebird 2010 Reconnaissance Prototype
- Ion Aircraft Ion 2007 prototype 2 seater tandem, 1 built
- Terrafugia Transition 2009 roadable airplane 2 seater, 2 built
- WLT Sparrow 2010 Ultralight, 13 built
- Synergy Aircraft Synergy 2011 Double boxtail demonstrator electric powered 1/4 scale model, in development
- AHRLAC Holdings Ahrlac 2014 reconnaissance attack, 1 built
- Commuter Craft Innovator 2016 prototype 2 seater, 1 built
- ISA 180 Seeker 2019 prototype monoplane

===== Between booms / UAV's =====
- IAI Scout 1977 UAV drone
- AAI RQ-2 Pioneer1986 UAV drone
- EADS Harfang 2008 UAV drone

===== Between outboard tail booms =====
- Blohm & Voss P208 1944 fighter project
- Skoda-Kauba SK SL6 1944 research one seat project

===== Coaxially in rear fuselage =====
- Royal Aircraft Factory F.E.3/A.E.1 1913 armoured biplane, 1 built
- Royal Aircraft Factory F.E.6, 1914, 1 built
- Gallaudet D-4 1918 seaplane, 2 built
- Vickers Type 161 1931 fighter prototype (with structural frame), 1 built
- Austria Krähe 1960 1 seat motorglider, unk no. built
- Brditschka HB-3 1971 2 seat motorglider, unk no. built
- Rhein Flugzeugbau RW 3 Multoplan 1955 27 built
- Rhein Flugzeugbau Sirius I 1969, 2 seats
- RFB/Grumman American Fanliner 1973, 2 seats, 2 built
- RFB Fantrainer 1977, 2 seats, 47 built
- Buselec 2, 2010 project, with electric motor
- Otto Celera 500L 2018

===== Nacelle above fuselage =====
WW1 or Before

- Curtiss Model F 1912 flying boat, 150+ built
- Benoist XIV 1913 transport flying boat, 2 built
- FBA Type A, B, C 1913 patrol flying boat, unk no. built
- Lohner E 1913, about 40 built
- Donnet-Denhaut flying boat 1915 patrol flying boat, about 1,085 built
- FBA Type H 1915 patrol flying boat, ~2000 built
- Grigorovich M-5 1915 patrol flying boat, about 300 built
- Lohner L, R and S 1915, 100+ built
- AD Flying Boat, Supermarine Channel & Sea Eagle 1916 patrol and airline flying boat, 27 built.
- Grigorovich M-9 1916 patrol flying boat, about 500 built
- Grigorovich M-11 1916 fighter flying boat, about 60 built
- Hansa-Brandenburg CC 1916 flying boat fighter, 73 built
- Macchi L.2 1916, reconnaissance flying boat, 17 built
- Macchi M.3 1916, reconnaissance flying boat, 200 built
- Norman Thompson N.T.4 1916 patrol flying boat, 72 built
- Oeffag-Mickl G 1916 trimotor patrol flying boat, 12 built
- Curtiss HS 1917 patrol flying boat, about 1,178 built
- Grigorovich M-15 1917 patrol flying boat, unk no. built
- Macchi M.5 1917, flying boat fighter, 244 built
- Norman Thompson N.T.2B 1917 flying boat trainer, 100+ built
- Tellier T.3 and Tc.6 1917 patrol flying boat, about 155 built
- Hansa-Brandenburg W.20 1918 U-boat flying boat, 3 built
- Macchi M.7 1918 flying boat fighter, 100+ built
- Macchi M.9 1918 flying boat bomber, 30 built
- Macchi M.12 1918 flying boat bomber, about 10 built
- Royal Aircraft Factory C.E.1 1918 flying boat, 2 built
- SIAI S.9 1918 flying boat, unk no. built
- SIAI S.12 1918 flying boat, 1 built
- Sperry Land and Sea Triplane 1918 patrol flying boat, 2 built
- Supermarine Baby 1918 flying boat fighter, 1 built

1920s

- Aeromarine 40 1919 flying boat trainer, 50 built
- Aeromarine 50 1919 transport flying boat, unk no. built
- Boeing B-1 1919 transport flying boat, 1 built
- SIAI S.13 1919 reconnaissance flying boat, unk no. built
- SIAI S.16 1919 flying boat, 100+ built
- Supermarine Sea Lion I & II 1919 racing flying boats, 2 built
- Vickers Viking, Vulture and Vanellus 1919 amphibious flying boats, 34 built.
- Vought VE-10 Batboat 1919 navy flying boat, 1 built
- Macchi M.18 1920 flying boat, 90+ built
- Supermarine Commercial Amphibian 1920, 1 built
- Supermarine Scarab 1923, 12 built
- Supermarine Seal 1921, 4+ built
- Supermarine Seagull 1921, 34 built
- CAMS 30 1922 flying boat trainer, 31 built
- CAMS 31 1922 flying boat fighter, 2 built
- Fokker B.I & III 1922 biplane reconnaissance flying boat, 2 built
- SIAI S.51 1922 racing flying boat, 1 built
- CAMS 38 1923 racing flying boat, 1 built
- FBA 17 1923 flying boat trainer, 300+ built
- Savoia-Marchetti S.57 1923 reconnaissance flying boat, 20 built
- Supermarine Sea Eagle 1923, 3 built
- Canadian Vickers Vedette 1924 forestry patrol flying boat, 60 built
- CANT 7 1924 flying boat trainer, 34 built
- Ikarus ŠM 1924 flying boat trainer, 42 built
- Macchi M.26 1924 flying boat fighter, 2 built
- CANT 10 1925 flying boat airliner, 18 built
- Rohrbach Ro VII Robbe 1925 flying boat, 3 built
- Savoia-Marchetti S.59 1925 reconnaissance flying boat, 240+ built
- CAMS 37 1926 reconnaissance flying boat, 332 built
- CAMS 46 1926 flying boat trainer, unk. no built
- CANT 18 1926 flying boat trainer, 29 built
- Savoia-Marchetti S.62 1926 reconnaissance flying boat, 175+ built
- CANT 25 1927 flying boat fighter, unk no. built
- Canadian Vickers Vista 1927 1 seat monoplane flying boat, 1 built
- Boeing Model 204 Thunderbird 1929 flying boat, 7 built
- Macchi M.41 1927 flying boat fighter, 42 built
- Supermarine Sheldrake 1927, 1 built
- Fokker F.11/B.IV 1928 monoplane transport flying boat, 7 built
- Rohrbach Ro X Romar 1928 flying boat, 3 built
- Savoia-Marchetti S.64 1928 distance record monoplane, 2 built

1930s

- FBA 310 1930 amphibious flying boat transport, 9 built
- SIAI S.67 1930 flying boat fighter, 3 built
- FBA 290 1931, amphibious flying boat trainer, 10 built
- Fizir AF-2 1931 amphibious flying boat trainer, 1 built
- Amiot 110-S 1931 patrol flying boat, 2 built
- Loening XSL 1931 submarine airplane, 1 built
- Beriev MBR-2 1931 flying boat, 1365 built
- Savoia-Marchetti S.66 1931 airliner flying boat, 24 built
- Tupolev MDR-2 1931 flying boat, 1 built
- Aichi AB-4 1932 flying boat, 6 built
- Boeing-Canada A-213 Totem 1932 flying boat, 1 built
- Dornier Do 12 1932 amphibian, 4 seats, 1 built
- Savoia-Marchetti SM.78 1932 patrol flying boat, 49 built
- General Aviation PJ 1933 monoplane flying boat, 5 built
- Loire 50 1933 training amphibian, 7 built
- Savoia-Marchetti SM.80bis 1933 transport amphibian, 1+ built
- Supermarine Seagull/Walrus 1933 military flying boat, 740 built
- Aichi E10A 1934 reconnaissance flying boat, 15 built
- Loire 130 1934 reconnaissance flying boat, 125 built
- Beriev MBR-2 1935 flying boat, 1365 built
- Curtiss-Wright CA-1 1935 amphibious flying boat, 3 built
- Dornier Do 18 1935 monoplane flying boat, 170 built
- Aichi E11A 1937 reconnaissance flying boat, 17 built
- Kawanishi E11K 1937 monoplane flying boat, 2 built
- SNCAO 30 1938 flying boat trainer, 2 built
- Nikol A-2 1939 amphibious flying boat trainer, 1 built

Post War II

- SCAN 20 1945 flying boat trainer, 24 built
- Volmer VJ-21 Jaybird 1947 2 seat light aircraft, unk no. built
- Volmer VJ-22 Sportsman 1958 2 seat homebuilt amphibian, (not all are pushers), 100+ built
- Lake Buccaneer 1959 amphibian, 4 seats, 1000+ built
- Aerosport Woody Pusher 1967 tandem 2 seater, parasol wing, 27 ex.
- Taylor Coot 1969 2 seat homebuilt amphibian, 70 built
- Aerosport Rail 1970 single seat ultralight, twin engine, 1 built
- Osprey Osprey 2 1973 2 seat homebuilt, unk no. built
- 3I Sky Arrow (now marketed by Magnaghi Aeronautica) 1982 maiden flight, ULM/LSA/GA tandem two-seater high wing, some 50 built
- RFB X-114 1977 ground-effect craft prototype 6/7 seat, 1 built
- Freedom Master FM-2 flying boat homebuilt prototype 2 seat, 1 built
- 3I Sky Arrow (Magnaghi Aeronautica) 1982, ULM/LSA/GA 2 seater tandem, about 50 built
- Tisserand Hydroplum and SMAN Pétrel 1983 homebuilt amphibian, about 63 built
- Microleve Corsario 1988 ultralight amphibious homebuilt, unk no. built
- Creative Flight Aerocat 2001 amphibious 4 seater prototype, 1 built
- Airmax Sea Max 2005 2 seat biplane amphibian, unk no. built
- CZAW Mermaid 2005 2 seat amphibious biplane, unk no. built

===== Below tail boom =====
- Nelson Dragonfly 1947 motorglider, 7 built
- AmEagle American Eaglet 1975 ultralight motorglider, 12 built
- Jean St-Germain Raz-Mut 1976 1 seat ultralight, 7 built
- Alpaero Sirius 1984 1 seat UL motorglider, 20 built
- Taylor Tandem, unk no. built

===== Between up and down tail booms =====
- Raab Krähe 1958 motorglider 1 seat, 30 built
- Brditschka HB-3, HB-21, HB-23 1971- 1982 motorgliders 2 seater (Note: the propeller revolves on the upper boom)
- HB-204 TornadoHB Flugtechnik 2013 prototype 2 seater

===== Above tailboom =====
- Loening Model 23 Air Yacht 1921 transport flying boat, 16 built
- Koolhoven F.K.30 Toerist 1927 2 seat monoplane, 1 built
- Curtiss-Wright Junior 1930 2 seat ultralight, 270 built
- Curtiss-Wright CW-3 Duckling 1931 ultralight amphibious flying boat, 3 built
- British Aircraft Company Drone 1932 1 seat ultralight, 33 built
- Siebel Si 201 1938 reconnaissance 2 built
- Republic RC-3 Seabee 1945 4 seat amphibian, 1,060 built
- Fokker F.25 Promotor 1946 transport, 20 built
- Aerauto PL.5C 1949 1949 roadable aircraft, 1 built
- Janowski Don Kichot/J-1 1970 1 seat homebuilt, unk no. built
- Spencer Air Car 1970 4 seat homebuilt amphibian, 51 built
- SZD-45 Ogar 1973 2 seat motorglider, 65 built
- Neukom AN-20 1978 motorglider experimental 1 seat
- Taylor Bird 1980 2 seat homebuilt, unk no. built
- Strojnik S-2 1980 motorglider 1 seater, 8+ built.
- Aérostructure Lutin 80 1983 1 seat ultralight motorglider, 2 built
- Birdman Chinook 1982 ultralight homebuilt, 1100+ built
- Alpha J-5 Marco 1983 1 seat ultralight motorglider, unk no. built
- Quad City Challenger 1983 2 seat ultralight, 3,000+ built
- Spectrum Beaver 1983 ultralight homebuilt, 2080+ built
- Funk Fk6 1985 1 seat ultralight motorglider, unk no. built
- Advanced Aeromarine Buccaneer 1988 2 seat amphibious biplane, unk no. built
- D-8 Moby Dick 1988 2 seater, 37 built
- Seabird Seeker 1989 observation aircraft 2 seater, 31 built
- Technoflug Piccolo 1989 1 seat ultralight motorglider, unk no. built
- Rans S-12 Airaile 1990 2 seater, 1100+ built
- Aeroprakt A-20 Vista 1991 2 seater
- Aviasud Engineering Albatros 1991 UL biplane
- Partenair Mystere 1996 2 seater, 3 built
- AAC SeaStar 1998 2 seat amphibious biplane, 91 built
- Alpaero Exel 1998 motoplaneur monoplane en kit, 9 ex.
- Sea Storm Z2, 1998 hydravion biplane, 12 built
- AAC SeaStar 2002 amphibious 2 seater, 91 built
- Ekolot JK 01A Elf 2006 motorglider monoplane
- Bagalini Bagaliante circa 2010 motorglider 1 seat
- ICON Aircraft A5 2013 2 seat amphibious light sport, in production
- Vickers Aircraft Wave 2 seat carbon fiber amphibious light sport aircraft, in final development

==== Propeller behind the tail ====
- Pénaud Planophore 1871 first aerodynamically stable fixed-wing aeroplane, rubber powered model, 1 built
- Convair 111 Air Car 1945 roadable airplane, 1 built
- Prescott Pusher 1985 4 seat homebuilt, about 30 built
- Air Quest Nova 21 1992 2 seat homebuilt, unk no. built
- Eviation Alice 2019 transport electric plane prototype in development 10/11 seats

==== Lateral behind wing ====
- Curtiss H-1 America 1914 transatlantic biplane, 2 built
- Friedrichshafen G.I 1915 bomber, 1 built
- LFG Roland G.I 1915 bomber, 1 built
- Rumpler G.I, II and III 1915 bomber c.220 built
- Schutte-Lanz G.I 1915 bomber 1 built (behind wing)
- Airco DH.3 1916 bomber, 2 built
- Avro 523 Pike 1916 bomber, 2 built
- Friedrichshafen G.II 1916 bomber, 35 built
- Gotha G.II 1916 bomber, 11 built
- Gotha G.III 1916 bomber, 25 built
- Gotha G.IV 1916 bomber, 230 built
- Royal Aircraft Factory F.E.4 1916 bomber, 2 built
- Friedrichshafen G.III 1917 bomber, 338 built
- Gotha G.V 1917 bomber, 205 built
- Boeing GA-1 1920 bomber 10 built
- Udet U 11 Kondor 1926 airliner, 1 built

1930 and later

- Praga E-210 and E-211 1936 transport, 2 built
- Bell YFM-1 Airacuda 1937 interceptor, 13 built
- Convair B-36 Peacemaker 1946 bomber, 384 built
- Baumann Brigadier 1947 transport, 2 built
- Nord 2100 Norazur 1947 transport, 1 built
- Monsted-Vincent MV-1 Starflight 1948 airliner, 1 built
- Piaggio P.136 1948 amphibious transport, 63 built
- Dinfia IA 45 Querandi 1957 5/6 seater, 2 built
- Piaggio P.166 1957 transport, 145 built
- AAC Angel, 1984 transport, 4 built
- Piaggio P.180 Avanti 1986 executive transport, 216+ built
- Mc Donnel Douglas MD-80 1987 Liner experimental Propfan
- EM-11 Orka 2003 4 seat transport, 5 built
- Burevestnik-24 2004 ground-effect aircraft 24 seats, 6 built
- OMA SUD Skycar 2007 transport, 1 built
- Aeroprakt A-36 Vulcan 2011 2 seater

==== Lateral nacelles ====
- Custer Channel Wing 1942 experimental aircraft, 4 built
- Embraer/FMA CBA 123 Vector 1990 airliner, 2 built
- NAL Saras 2004 airliner, 2 built

=== Remote drive ===
==== Propeller ahead of tail ====
===== Within airframe =====
- Megone biplane 1913 2 seat, 1 built
- Fischer Fibo-2a 1954 1 seat motorglider, 1 built
- Rhein Flugzeugbau RW 3 Multoplan 1955 RFB Fantrainer prototype, 27 built
- Kuffner WK-1 1970 motorglider 1 seat, 1 built
- Rhein-Flugzeugbau Sirius II 1972 2 seat motorglider, unk no. built
- Neukom AN-20C 1983 1 seat ultralight homebuilt motorglider, 1 built
- PJ-II Dreamer 2016 jet fighter style 2 seater, 1 built

===== Behind wing =====
- Burgess model I 1913 patrol floatplane, 1 built
- Mann & Grimmer M.1 1915, 1 built
- Carden-Baynes Bee 1937 2 seat tourer, 1 built
- Raab Krähe 1958 1 seat motorglider, 30 built
- Eipper Quicksilver 1974 1 seat ultralight
- Theseus Aircraft 1996 NASA research aircraft, no pilot, 1 built

==== Inside tail ====
- Bede XBD-2/BD-3 1961 ducted fan boundary layer control aircraft, 1 built
- Mississippi State University XAZ-1 Marvelette 1962 experimental aircraft to test ideas XV-11 Marvel, 1 built
- Mississippi State University XV-11 Marvel 1965 boundary layer control test aircraft, 1 built

==== Behind tail ====
- Antoinette I, 1906, 2 seats experimental, project
- Paulhan-Tatin Aéro-Torpille No.1 1911 monoplane, 1 built
- Kasyanenko No. 5 1917 experimental biplane, 1 built
- Göppingen Gö 9 1941 experimental propulsion aircraft, 1 built
- Dornier Do 212 1942 experimental amphibian, 1 built
- Douglas XB-42 Mixmaster 1944, bomber, 2 built
- Douglas DC-8 (piston airliner) 1945, transport project, not built
- Lockheed Big Dipper 1945 transport, 1 built
- Douglas Cloudster II 1947 transport, 1 built
- Waco Aristocraft 1947 transport, 1 built
- Acme Sierra 1948 1 seat experimental, 1 built
- Allenbaugh Grey Ghost, 1948 1 seat experimental, 1 built
- PAR Special, 1950 1 seat experimental, 1 built
- Petit Special, 1948 1 seat experimental, 1 built
- Planet Satellite 1949 4 seat transport, 1 built
- Taylor Aerocar 1949 2 seat roadable aircraft, 6 built
- Pützer Bussard SR-57 1958 experimental 2 seater, 90 hp, 1 built

1960 and later

- HMPAC Puffin 1961 human powered aircraft, 2 built
- Lesher Nomad 1961 experimental 2 seater homebuilt, one built
- Aerocar Aero-Plane 1964 four seater 1 built
- Lesher Teal 1965 experimental 1 seat homebuilt, one built
- HPA Toucan 1972 human powered aircraft, 1 built
- Ryson STP-1 Swallow 1972 2 seat homebuilt motorglider, 1 built
- Bede BD-5 1973 1 seat homebuilt, about 150 built
- Aerocar Mini-IMP 1974 1 seat homebuilt, 250+ built
- AmEagle American Eaglet 1975 1 seat self-launching ultralight sailplane, 12 built
- Landray GL.02 1978 tandem layout (Pou du Ciel) 1 seat, 1 built
- Grinvalds Orion 1981 4 seat homebuilt, about 17 built
- LearAvia Lear Fan 1981 transport, 3 built
- Cirrus VK-30 1988 5 seat homebuilt, about 13 built
- Miller JM-2 and Pushy Galore 1989 racer, 3 built
- SolarFlight Sunseeker I 1990 solar aircraft 1 seater, 1 ex.
- Grob GF 200 1991 transport, 1 built
- Myasishchev Mayal 1992 multi-purpose amphibian, 1 built
- NASA Perseus 1994 research aircraft, 1 built
- Vmax Probe 1997 homebuilt racer, 1 built
- Ameur Aviation Balbuzard/Baljims/Altania 1995 2 seater prototypes, 5 built
- Bede BD-12 1998 2 seat homebuilt, 1 built
- Aceair AERIKS 200 2002 2 seat kitplane, 1 built
- Chudzik CC-02 Rafale 2007 prototype three surface 2 seater tandem, 1ex.
- LH Aviation LH-10 Ellipse 2007 2 seat homebuilt, 3 built

==== Propeller above fuselage or wing ====
- Schleicher ASH 26 1995 1 seat glider with retractable propeller, 234 built
- Airfish-3 WIG 1990 Wing In Ground Effect demonstrator one seat, 1 built
- Airfish-8 WIG 2007 Wing In Ground Effect transport prototype 8/10 seats, 2 built

== Canard and tandem layouts ==
A canard is an aircraft with a smaller wing ahead of the main wing. A tandem layout has both front and rear wings of similar dimensions.

=== Direct drive ===
- Santos-Dumont 14-bis 1906 first public controlled sustained flight, 1 built
- Fabre Hydravion 1910, first successful floatplane, 1 built
- Paulhan biplane 1910, 3 built
- Voisin Canard 1911 biplane, 10+ built
- Gee Bee Model Q 1931 experimental, 1 built
- Ambrosini SS.2 & 3 1935 experimental aircraft, 2 built (Note: see Ambrosini SS.4#Development)
- Ambrosini SS.4 1939 prototype fighter, 1 built
- Curtiss-Wright XP-55 Ascender 1943 prototype fighter, 3 built
- Miles M.35 Libellula 1942, experimental tandem wing carrier-based fighter, 1 built
- Miles M.39B Libellula 1943, experimental (5/8 scale) tandem wing carrier-based bomber, 1 built
- Skoda-Kauba V7 1944 1 seat, project

1945 and later In this section Rutan pushers are more than 1000 built.

- Mikoyan-Gurevich MiG-8 Utka 1945 swept wing demonstrator prototype, 1 built
- Lockspeiser LDA-01 1971 experimental scale development aircraft, 1 built
- Rutan VariViggen 1972 homebuilt, about 20 built
- Rutan VariEze 1975 2 seat homebuilt, about 400 built
- Rutan Long-EZ 1979 2 seat homebuilt, about 800 built
- Diehl Aeronautical XTC Hydrolight 1981 amphibian UL 1 seat
- OMAC Laser 300 1981, transport, 3 built
- Cozy III 1982 3 seater amateur built
- Avtek 400 1984 transport, 1 built
- Cozy Mk IV 1988 four seater amateur built, ~ 350 built
- Beechcraft Starship 1989 airliner, 53 built
- Berkut 360 1988 2 seater tandem, 31 built
- AASI Jetcruzer 1989 transport, 3 built
- Velocity SE 1995 4 seater, ~ 268 built
- Steve Wright Stagger-Ez 2003 modified Cozy homebuilt, 1 built
- RMT Bateleur 115 T 2007 2 seater
- E-Go Aeroplanes e-Go 2013 ultralight and light-sport aircraft, 1 built
- Cobalt Co50 Walkyrie 2015 prototype 4 seater, 1 built

=== Remote engine mounting ===
- Langley Aerodrome Number 5 1896 experimental model
- Wright Flyer 1903 experimental airplane, first recognized powered, sustained flight, 1 built
- Wright Model A 1906 biplane, about 60 built
- Deperdussin-de Feure model 2, 1910, experimental, 1 built
- De Bruyere C1 1917 fighter prototype 1 seater, 1 ex.
- Kyūshū J7W, prototype fighter, 1 seat, 2130 hp, 1945, 2 built
- AeroVironment Gossamer Condor 1977 human powered aircraft won Kremer prize, 1 built
- AeroVironment Gossamer Albatross 1979 human powered aircraft, 2 built
- Dickey E-Racer 1986 homebuilt, unk no. built
- British Aerospace P.1233-1 Saba 1988 anti-helicopter and close air support attack aircraft, project

=== Joined wings ===
A tandem (or three-surface) configuration whose wingtips are joined is a Closed wing.

- Ben Brown SC c. 1932, experimental joined wing, 1 built
- Ligeti Stratos 1985 1 seat homebuilt, 2 built
- Airkraft Sunny 1989 2 seater, 250 built

== Tailless aircraft, Flying wings ==
=== Tailless aircraft ===
Tailless aircraft lack a horizontal stabilizer.

- Dunne D.4 1908, 1 built
- Dunne D.5 1910, 1 built
- Dunne D.6 & D.7 1911 monoplane, 2 built
- Dunne D.8 1912, 5 built
- Westland-Hill Pterodactyl series 1928, several built
- Lippisch Delta 1 1931, experimental tailless monoplane, 1 built
- Waterman Whatsit 1932 roadable aircraft, 1 built
- Waterman Arrowplane 1935 roadable aircraft, 1 built
- Waterman Arrowbile 1937 roadable aircraft, 5 built
- Kayaba Ku-4 1941 (not flown) research aircraft, 1 built
- Handley Page Manx 1943 experimental tailless aircraft, 1 built
- Northrop XP-56 Black Bullet 1943 tailless fighter, 2 built
- Sud-Est SE-2100, prototype tourer, 2 seats, 140 hp, 1945
- M.L. Aviation Utility 1953 inflatable wing, 4 built
- DINFIA IA 38 1960 transport, 1 built
- Fauvel AV.45 1960 1 seat motor glider, unk no. built
- Rohr 2-175 1974 2 seat roadable aircraft, 1 built
- Cascade Kasperwing I-80 1976 UL 1 seater
- Pterodactyl Ascender 1979 1 seat ultralight, 1396 built
- Mitchell U2 Superwing 1980 1 seat ultralight
- Facet Opal, 1988, 1 seat, experimental flying wing, 1 built
- Wingco Atlantica 2002 Blended wing-body demonstrator 5 seats, 1 built
- Aériane Swift Light PAS 2007 monoplane
- Horten Aircraft HX-2 2019 2 seat prototype

==== Tailless, fabric wing, no fuselage ====
- Ultralight trike or Flexwing
- Paramotor or Powered paraglider
- Powered parachute

=== Flying wings ===
Flying wings lack a distinct fuselage, with crew, engines, and payload contained within the wing structure.

- Horten V 1938 powered testbed, 3 built
- Northrop N-1M 1940 experimental flying wing, 1 built
- Northrop N-9M 1942 experimental flying wing, 4 built
- Horten H.VII 1944 2 seat prototype
- Northrop B-35 1946 bomber, 4 built
- Davis Flying Wing 1987
- Horten PUL-10 1992 2 seater

== Push-pull aircraft ==
=== Sides of fuselage ===
- Zeppelin-Staaken R.V 1917 bomber, 3 built
- Bristol Braemar 1918 bomber, 2 built
- Handley Page V/1500 1918 bomber, 63 built
- Farman F.121 Jabiru 1923 airliner, 9 built
- Dornier Do K 1929 airliner, 3 built
- Fokker F.32 1929 airliner, 7 built
- Farman F.220 1932 airliner and bomber, about 80 built

=== Above fuselage ===
- Felixstowe Porte Baby 1915 patrol flying boat, 11 built
- Curtiss NC 1918 patrol flying boat, 10 built
- Johns Multiplane 1919 bomber, 1 built
- Bristol Pullman 1920 airliner, 1 built
- Naval Aircraft Factory TF 1920 fighter flying boat, 4 built
- SIAI S.22 1921 racing flying boat, 1 built
- Dornier Wal 1922 flying boat, about 300 built
- CAMS 33 1923 patrol flying boat, 21 built
- Macchi M.24 1924 flying boat, unk. no built
- Savoia-Marchetti S.55 1924 flying boat, 243+ built
- Boeing XPB 1925 patrol flying boat, 1 built
- Caproni Ca.73 1925 bomber unk. no. built
- NVI F.K.33 1925 airliner, 1 built
- CAMS 51 1926 flying boat, 3 built
- Dornier Do R Superwal 1926 airliner flying boat, 19 built
- Kawasaki Ka 87 1926 bomber, 28 built
- Latécoère 21 1926 airliner flying boat, 7 built
- Latécoère 23 1927 transport flying boat, 1 built
- Latécoère 24 1927 mailplane flying boat, 1 built
- Farman F.180 1927 airliner, 3 built
- Savoia-Marchetti S.63 1927 flying boat, 1 built
- CAMS 53 1928 transport flying boat, 30 built
- CAMS 55 1928 patrol flying boat, 112 built
- Latécoère 32 1928 mailplane flying boat, 8 built
- Latham 47 1928 patrol flying boat, 16 built
- Dornier X 1929 airliner flying boat, 3 built
- Comte AC-3 1930 bomber, 1 built
- Dornier Do P 1930 bomber, 1 built
- Dornier Do S 1930 flying boat, 1 built
- Hinkler Ibis 1930 2 seat monoplane, 1 built
- Latécoère 340 1930 airliner flying boat, 1 built
- Latécoère 380 1930 flying boat, 5 built
- Blériot 125 1931 airliner, 1 built
- Bratu 220 1932 airliner, 1 built
- Latécoère 500 1932 transport flying boat, 2 built
- Caproni Ca.90 1929 bomber, 1 built
- Sikorsky XP2S 1932 patrol flying boat, 1 built
- CAMS 58 1933 airliner flying boat, 4 built
- Lioré et Olivier LeO H-27 1933 mailplane flying boat 1 built
- Loire 70 1933 patrol flying boat, 8 built
- Tupolev ANT-16 1933 bomber 1 built
- Tupolev ANT-20 1934 transport, 2 built
- Tupolev MTB-1 1934 patrol flying boat, 25 built
- Dornier Do 18 1935 patrol flying boat, 170 built
- Bartini DAR 1936 patrol flying boat, 1 built
- Chyetverikov ARK-3 1936 flying boat, 7 built
- Dornier Do 26 1939 push-pull flying boat, 6 built
- Dornier Seastar 1984 push-pull amphibious 12 seats, 2 built

=== Extremities ===
- Caproni Ca.60 1921 airliner flying boat, 1 built
- Dornier Do 335 1943 push-pull fighter, 38 built
- Moynet Jupiter 1963 push-pull transport, 2 built
- Aero Design DG-1 1977 push-pull racer, 1 built
- Rutan Defiant 1978 transport, 19+ built
- Rutan Voyager 1984 endurance record aircraft, 1 built (Note: Extension shaft on aft engine. The tractor engine only used during take-off, climb and some part of the course. It was actually used to cope with aft engine trouble)*
- Star Kraft SK-700 1994 push-pull transport,
- Aeronix Airelle 2002 tandem wing 2 seater, 5 built

=== On nose and between booms ===
- Siemens-Schuckert DDr.I 1917 fighter, 1 built
- Thomas-Morse MB-4 1920 mailplane, 2+ built
- Bellanca TES 1929, distance record aircraft, 1 built
- Savoia-Marchetti S.65 1929 racing floatplane 1 built
- Tupolev I-12 1931 Fighter prototype
- Fokker D.XXIII 1939 fighter, 1 built
- Moskalyev SAM-13 1940 (unflown) push-pull fighter, 0 built
- Marton X/V (RMI-8) 1944 (unflown) fighter, 1 destroyed before completion
- Cessna Skymaster 1963 push-pull transport, 2993 built
- Canaero Toucan 1986 ultralight, 16+ built
- Schweizer RU-38 Twin Condor 1995 push-pull reconnaissance aircraft, 5 built
- Adam A500 2002 push-pull transport, 7 built

=== On wings and between booms ===
- Caproni Ca.1 1914 bomber, 162 built
- Caproni Ca.2 1915 bomber, 9 built
- AD Seaplane Type 1000 1916 bomber, 1 built
- Anatra DE 1916 bomber, 1 built
- Caproni Ca.3 1916 bomber, about 300 built
- Caproni Ca.4 1917 triplane bomber, 44-53 built
- Caproni Ca.5 1917 bomber, 662 built
- Gotha G.VI 1918 bomber, 2 built
- Grahame-White Ganymede 1919 bomber/airliner, 1 built

== Rotorcraft ==
- Bensen autogyros 1953
- Fairey Jet Gyrodyne 1954, experimental gyrodyne
- McDonnell XV-1 1954, experimental compound helicopter, 550 hp
- Avian Gyroplane 1960, 2 seats, about 6 built
- Wallis autogyros 1961
- CarterCopter / Carter PAV 1998
- Sikorsky X2 2008, experimental compound helicopter
- Sikorsky S-97 Raider 2015, experimental compound helicopter

== See also ==
- List of pusher aircraft by configuration - in alphabetical order
- Pusher configuration
- Push-pull configuration
- Tractor configuration

=== Bibliography ===
- Extension-Shaft Pusher Type Aircraft, Sport aviation
