= CAMS 54 =

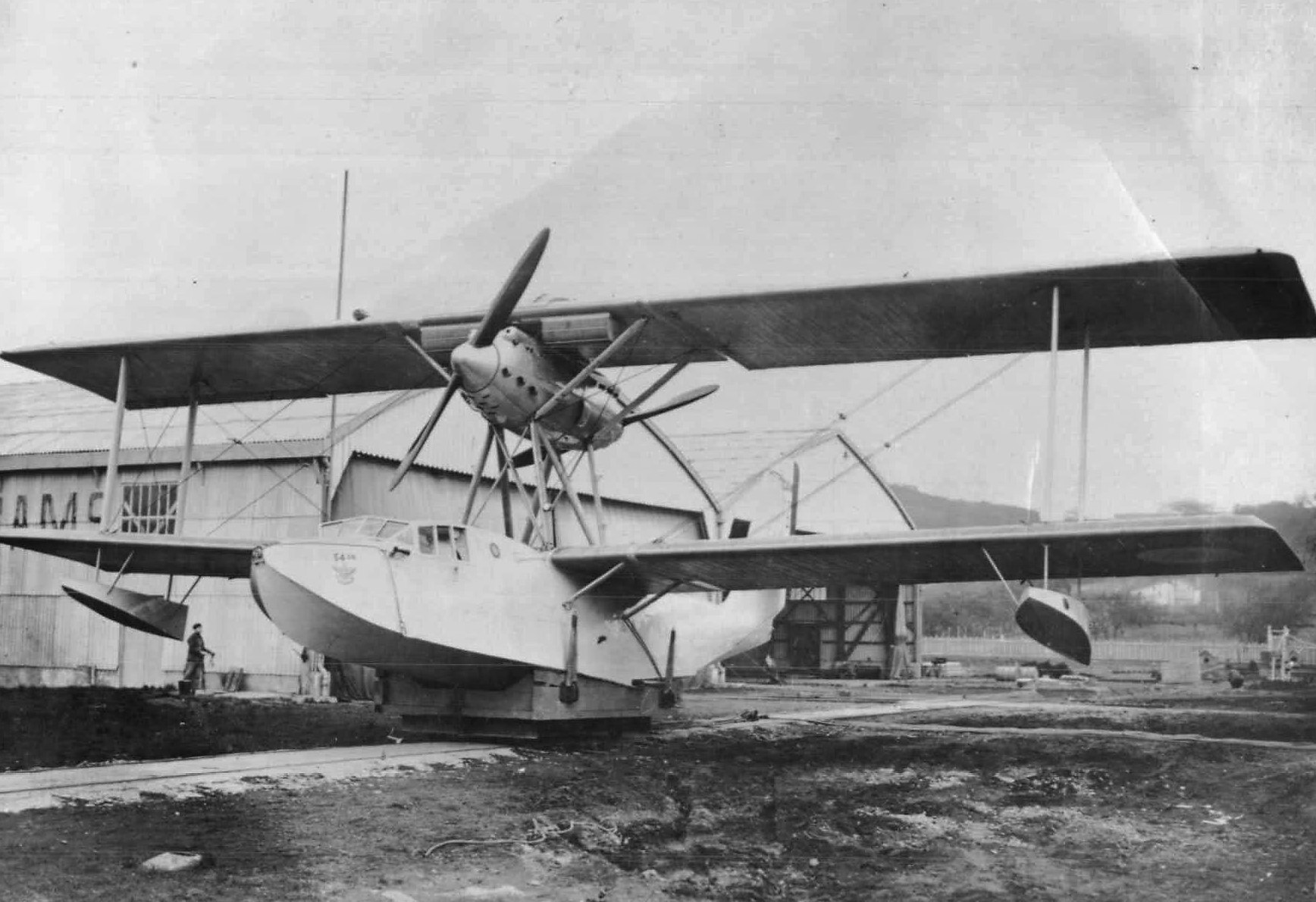

General information
- Type: Long range flying boat
- National origin: France
- Manufacturer: Chantiers Aéro-Maritimes de la Seine (CAMS)
- Number built: 1

History
- First flight: Late March 1928
- Developed from: CAMS 51

The CAMS 54 was a strengthened and more powerful version of the French CAMS 51 civil transport and naval reconnaissance flying boat, developed for transatlantic flights. It is sometimes referred to as the 54 GR (Grand Raid or very long range flight).

== Design and development ==
The last CAMS 51 prototype, the naval reconnaissance CAMS 51 GR, had set a world weight-to-height record in August 1927 and demonstrated that it could take-off with one engine whilst carrying a load equal to that of the fuel required for a transatlantic crossing. The CAMS 54 was strengthened to carry the 4,110 L (900 imp gal; 1,090 US gal) needed for a range of 4,300 km (2,700 mi) and provided with significantly increased engine power.

The CAMS 54 was a single-bay biplane with equal span, rectangular plan wings mounted without stagger. The upper wing was in three parts, a short centre section and two long outer panels; the lower wing had two inner panels, mounted on the upper fuselage and strengthened by short, parallel pairs of struts to mid-fuselage, and two outer panels. Only the lower wing had dihedral. Both upper and lower wings carried narrow-chord ailerons, linked externally by wires, out to their tips. Both were wooden structures based on pairs of spruce box spars and fabric covered, braced together with parallel pairs of interplane struts to the spars.

The flying boat was powered by a pair of engines in push-pull configuration, mounted above the fuselage and just below the upper wing on two inward-leaning pairs of tubular N-struts, with further transverse cross-bracing. Their mounting also supported the wing centre-section with parallel pairs of struts outwards to the spars. Two types of engine could be used, either 370 kW (500 hp) Hispano-Suiza 12Mbr V12 enclosed in a common streamlined cowling and cooled with tubular radiators on the wing undersides on either side of the engines or 360 kW (480 hp) Gnome-Rhône 9Akx Jupiter nine-cylinder radials, mounted uncowled for cooling, with a circular section cowling between them. Both were geared-down. The forward propeller was well ahead of the wing leading edge but the rear turned in a shallow cut-out in the upper trailing edge. These engines were much more powerful than the 280 kW (380 hp) Gnome et Rhône 9Aas of the CAMS 51 and to accommodate them and their propellers on new mountings required the inter-plane gap to be increased.

Structurally the hull was identical with that of the CAMS 51, with longerons and transverse oak frames. It was covered with double teak and plywood planking below the waterline and ply elsewhere. At the nose the underside had a sharp V-section but this softened aft into a double curvature section; there were two steps, the forward one below the rear of the wing. Stability on the water was provided by a pair of unstepped floats, strut-mounted below the interplane struts. Internally the hull was divided into five compartments by reinforced bulkheads, the first forming a hold. The next contained the pilots' enclosed cabin, which was well forward and ahead of the leading propeller, with side-by-side seats, multiple front and side windows and access panels over the seats. Behind the pilots, the radio operator's and navigator's positions were on opposite sides of the aircraft. The fourth compartment housed eight 620 L (140 imp gal; 160 US gal) fuel tanks, with a central corridor between them providing access to the final compartment which held a toilet on one side and a bunk on the other. Behind the last bulkhead was a long, empty hold which reached back to the tail and was easily accessed though an upper, port-side hatch.

The CAMS 54 had a tall, straight-edged fin and balanced rudder. Its rectangular plan, wire braced tailplane was mounted about halfway up the fin. Its constant chord, balanced elevators were also essentially rectangular, separated by a cut-out for rudder movement. All the rear surfaces were fabric covered; the fixed parts were wood-framed and the control surfaces metal.

== Operational history ==
The CAMS 54's first flights were made in late March 1928, powered with the Hispano-Suiza engines. By 12 May 1928 it was making long test flights with the Gnome et Rhône radials, flown by Lt. Paris. On 15 May it took off with a record load of 4,400 kg (9,700 lb).

The east-west South Atlantic crossing was begun in July 1928, a year which saw many such attempts. On 22 July the CAMS 54, with the radial engines, named La Frégate and crewed by Paris, second pilot and wireless operator Cadou and flight engineer Marot, flew to Horta, Azores. The first eight hours were uneventful at speeds around 175 km/h (109 mph; 94 kn) but failure of the rear engine then seriously slowed the aircraft and the 2,080 km (1,290 mi; 1,120 nmi) flight lasted about 14 hr 15 min, an average speed of about 145 km/h (90 mph; 78 kn). Inspection of the engine after landing showed it could not be repaired and also that the heavy loads sustained by the forward engine operating alone had caused serious wear, ruling out further long flights. The French Marine Ministry therefore decided to bring La Frégate back to the mainland by boat.

In February 1929 La Frégate was being prepared for another flight over the South Atlantic, equipped with 450 kW (600 hp) V-12 Hispano engines.

== Specifications (HS engine) ==
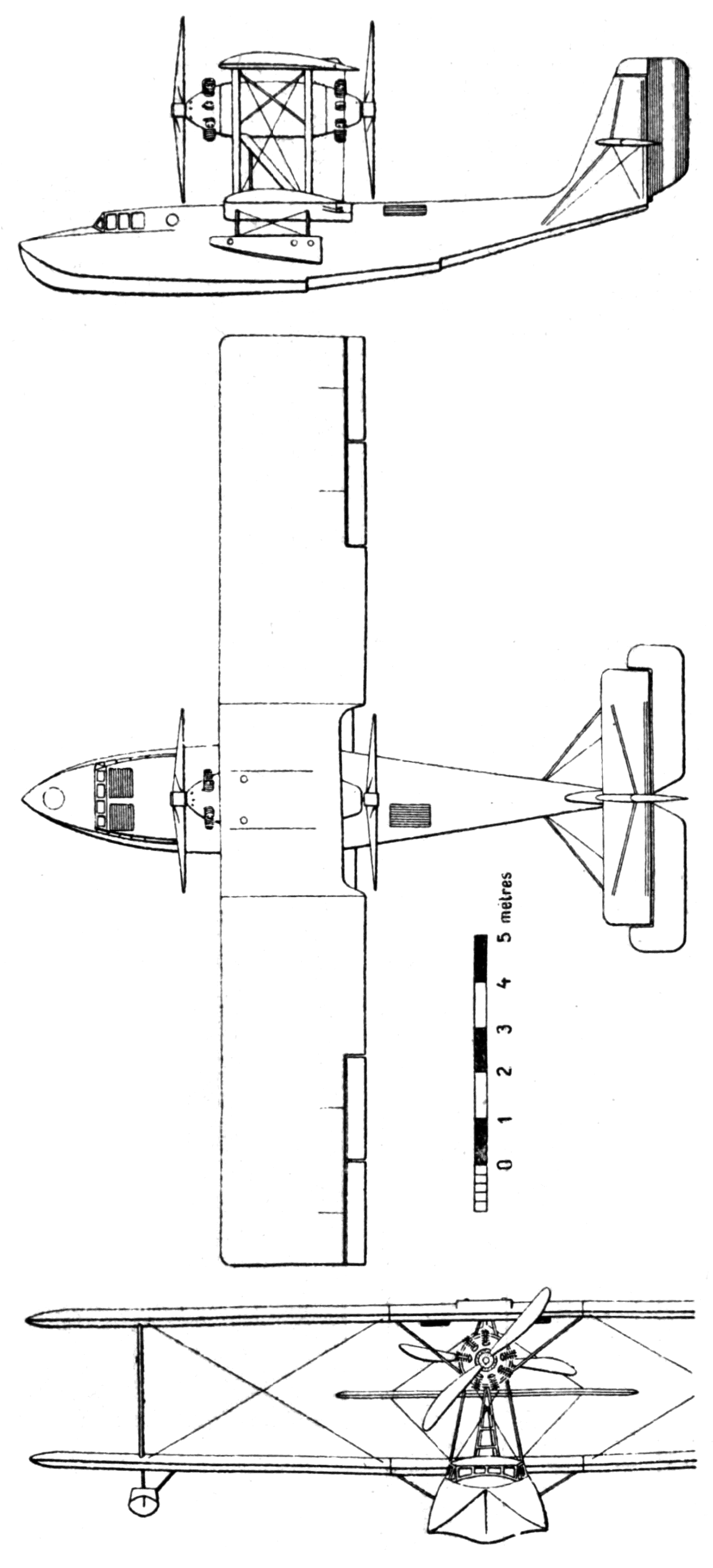
CAMS 54 'La Frégate' 3-view drawing from L'Aérophile August,1928

Data from Les Ailes, May 1928

General characteristics

- Crew: Three
- Length: 14.84 m (48 ft 8 in)
- Wingspan: 20.40 m (66 ft 11 in)
- Height: 5.22 m (17 ft 2 in)
- Wing area: 113 m^{2} (1,220 sq ft)
- Empty weight: 4,290 kg (9,458 lb)
- Max takeoff weight: 8,400 kg (18,519 lb)
- Powerplant: 2 × Hispano-Suiza 12Mbr V-12 water-cooled piston engines, 370 kW (500 hp) each
- Propellers: 2-bladed

Performance

- Maximum speed: 210 km/h (130 mph, 110 kn)
- Range: 4,300 km (2,700 mi, 2,300 nmi) with 4,110 kg (9,060 lb) load
- Service ceiling: 2,300 m (7,500 ft) with 4,110 kg (9,060 lb) load; 4,400 m (14,400 ft) with 2,800 kg (6,200 lb)
- Time to altitude: 50 min to 4,400 m (14,400 ft) with 4,110 kg (9,060 lb) load; 14 min with 2,800 kg (6,200 lb)
- Take-off speed: 115 km/h (71 mph; 62 kn)
