= Air Orient =

French airline

Air Orient (Ligne d'Air Orient)
- Founded: 1929, France
- Commenced operations: 1929, France
- Ceased operations: 7 October 1933 (merged with Aéropostale, Air Union, CFRNA and SGTA to form Air France)
- Operating bases: Paris–Le Bourget Airport
- Headquarters: 2 rue Marbeuf, Paris, France
- Key people: Ernest Roume (1858-1941) - Chairman; Maurice Noguè - Managing Director

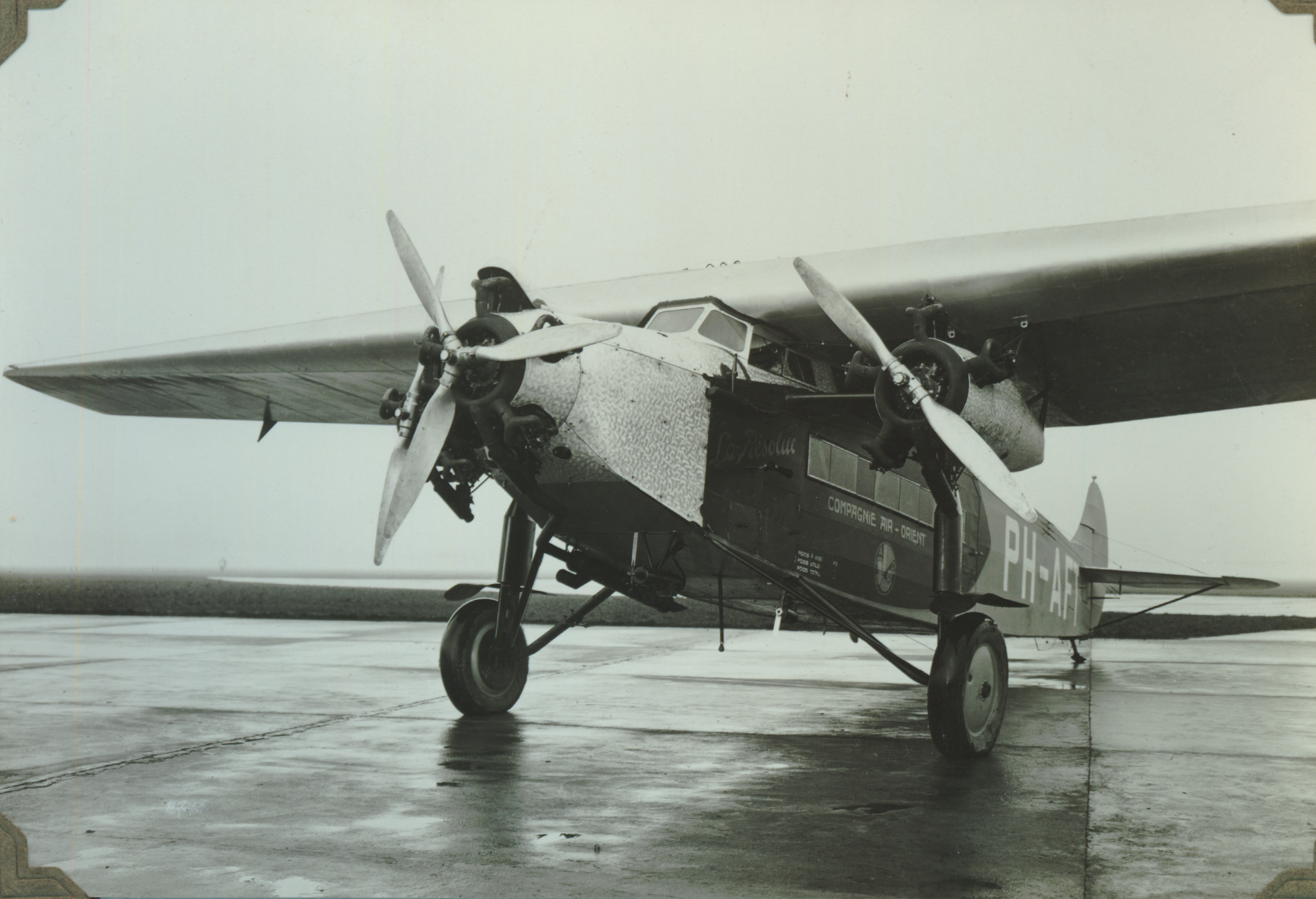
Fokker F-VII-B3M replica

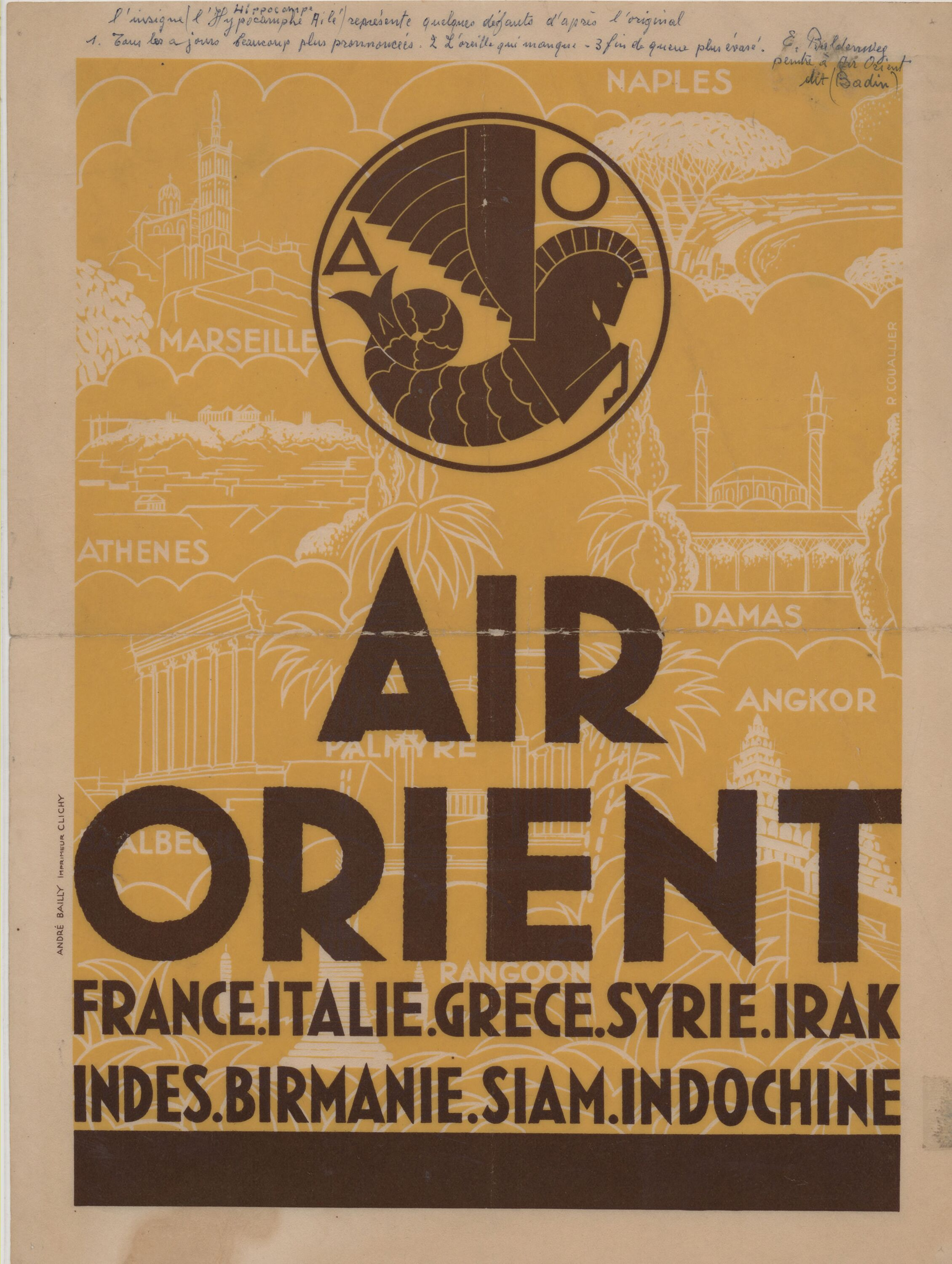

Air Orient was an airline based in France, created in 1929 by the merger of Air Asie (c. 1928) and Air Union Lignes d’Orient (c. 1927 – renamed from Messageries Transaeriennes 1923). As its name suggests, it specialized in flights to the Orient and the Far East. The winged seahorse was chosen as the company's symbol and was inherited by Air France upon its incorporation. A weekly service linked Marseille to Saigon (then French Indochina), a journey that took ten and a half days and touched 17 airports in Europe, the Middle East, and Asia. The airline was merged into SCELA which, on 30 August 1933, gave life to Air France, operational from on 7 October.

== Destinations ==
The airline connected France and parts of Europe to the Middle East and Far East, many of which were French colonial outposts:

- France – Paris, Lyon, Marseille
- Great Britain – London
- Italy – Naples
- Greece – Corfu, Athens
- Lebanon – Beirut
- Syria – Damascus, Aleppo
- Iraq – Baghdad
- Persia – Bushehr (Bouchir), Jask (Djask)
- India – Allahabad, Karachi, Jodhpur, Calcutta
- Siam – Bangkok
- Burma – Rangoon, Akyab
- Indochina – Saigon

== Fleet ==
- Chantiers Aéro-Maritimes de la Seine CAMS 53 seaplanes - 2
- SPCA Météore 63 – 3 from Air Union Lignes d’Orient
- Farman F.190

== Code data ==
- IATA Code: UT
- ICAO Code: ORT
- Callsign: Air Orient
