= CAMS 110 =

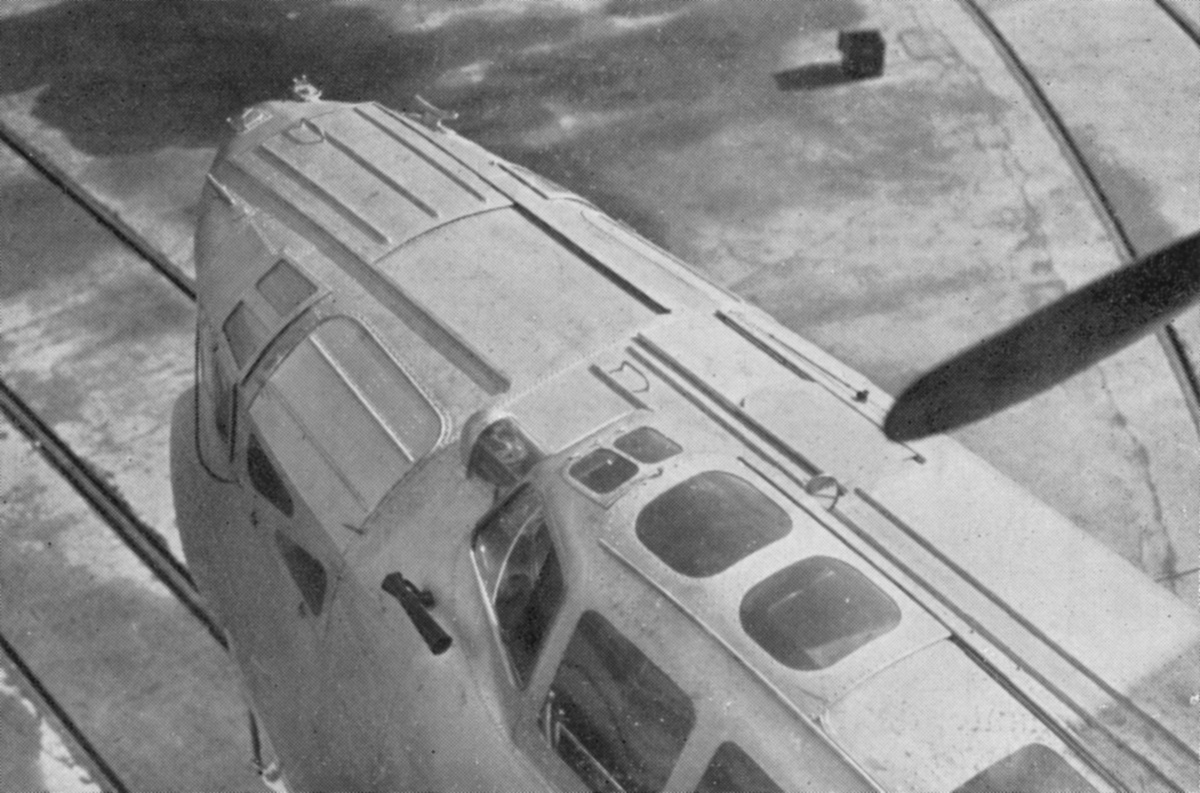
- The nose of the sole CAMS 110

General information
- Type: Long range reconnaissance, exploration and bomber aircraft
- National origin: France
- Manufacturer: Chantiers Aéro-Maritimes de la Seine (CAMS)
- Designer: Maurice Hurel and Louis Coroller
- Number built: 1

History
- First flight: July 1934
- Developed from: CAMS 55

The CAMS 110 was a French twin engine biplane flying boat built to fill a range of maritime military roles including long range reconnaissance, bombing and general exploration. It was not selected for production and only one was built.

== Design ==
Though by the mid-1930s monoplanes were replacing biplanes, a CAMS analysis suggested that the needs of French maritime air power were better met with the older design, not least because it was thought to be more resistant to battle damage. It followed the layout of their 1928 CAMS 55 flying boat.

It had equal span, single bay wings mounted without stagger and joined on each side by a pair of parallel, vertical interplane struts. Bracing wires completed the structure. The upper wing was in three parts, a thick, rectangular centre section and two outer panels with parallel chord over about their inner halves, narrowing to long, semi-elliptical tips. The outer parts had only about 1° of dihedral. The lower wing was similar; joined to the upper fuselage, its thick centre section was shorter than that of the upper one and shared the greater (3.5°) dihedral of its outer panels. There were balanced ailerons on the outer, curved trailing edges of both upper and lower wings, each split into two adjacent sections.

The wing structure was wooden with two spruce box spars which were parallel in the centre sections but converged outboard. The leading edge was plywood skinned, as were other stressed areas, and the rest fabric covered. The CAMS 110's twin push-pull configuration 660 kW (880 hp) Hispano-Suiza 12Ybrs liquid-cooled V12 engines were enclosed within a single nacelle together with the radiator and mounted close to the underside of the upper wing on two streamlined duralumin N-form struts from the lower wing roots, assisted by transverse X-struts. Short, outward-leaning struts from the engine frame supported the centre of the upper wing and N-form struts braced the lower centre section to the fuselage. The forward propeller was well ahead of the leading edge but the rear one was close to the trailing edge. The upper centre section housed both fuel and oil tanks, with more fuel stored in the lower centre section.

In contrast to its wooden wings, the hull of the CAMS 110 was all metal. It was built from transverse and longitudinal light alloy frames and covered with védal, duralumin with an outer layer of aluminium for protection from sea-water. The planing bottom had two steps, one under the trailing edge of the wing and the other further aft. Longitudinal stability was assured by wing floats of similar construction to the hull. The CAMS 110 was intended for long flights and carried five or six crew, all in enclosed accommodation. The commander, who was navigator, observer and bomb-aimer was housed in the nose in a cabin with three windows on each side and provided with a chart table. He could also operate one of the two machine guns on mounts just aft of the windows or use a position in the roof from which, behind a folding glass windscreen, he could observe in the open air. On top of the fuselage, offset to port, was a long glazed cabin which seated two pilots in tandem, provided with dual control. Below, on the other side of the fuselage was the flight engineer's position and behind him the radio operator's post. Machine gun mounts allowed a gunner to cover either side. Further aft there was a sleeping compartment, a kitchen and a toilet.

The wooden empennage was conventional, with a wire braced, constant chord tailplane mounted around one third fin height; its construction was similar to that of the wing. A photograph from mid-1934, at about the time of its first flight, shows the 110 with a trapezoidal fin, similar to that of the earlier CAMS 55. Both the vertical-edged rudder and elevators had full-span, Flettner type servo tabs.

== Development ==
The CAMS 110 first flew in July 1934 from the Seine at Sartrouville, piloted by Yves-Marie Lantz. By April 1935 a diagram and a photograph show the 110 with a fin enlarged in area by a vertical leading edge above the tailplane. At this time it was undergoing tests at Saint-Raphaël, Var, where it took off in 33 seconds with a 10 tonne (c.10 ton) load. It was not ordered by the French Navy, who by then had realised that no large biplane could begin to match the speeds of the new generation of monoplanes with retractable undercarriages.

== Operational history ==
After its military evaluation, the CAMS 110 was entered onto the French civil register as F-ANVX, owned by the French State, in June 1935. In early July it carried the French Air Minister, M. Giscard d'Estaing, to Lisbon to discuss a joint Portuguese-French trans-Atlantic air route via the Azores. The CAMS 110 itself was seen as a candidate for this service, though it never made the crossing.

It was removed from the civil register and militarised again in March 1936 before returning to the civil register as F-AOCP and being used for equipment development. In May 1939 it was returned to the French Navy and based at Berre before its loss at the start of World War II.

== Specifications ==
Data from Les Ailes 11 May 1935

General characteristics

- Crew: Five/six
- Length: 16.30 m (53 ft 6 in)
- Wingspan: 22.50 m (73 ft 10 in)
- Height: 6.0 m (19 ft 8 in)
- Wing area: 115 m^{2} (1,240 sq ft)
- Airfoil: Potez No.9, a modifified Clark Y profile
- Empty weight: 5,350 kg (11,795 lb) equipped
- Max takeoff weight: 9,400 kg (20,723 lb)
- Fuel capacity: 4,300 L (950 imp gal; 1,100 US gal) maximum
- Powerplant: 2 × Hispano-Suiza 12Ybrs 1 liquid-cooled, supercharged V12, 660 kW (880 hp) each , geared down 3:2
- Propellers: 2-bladed

Performance

- Maximum speed: 240 km/h (150 mph, 130 kn) at 2,300 m (7,500 ft)
- Cruise speed: 180 km/h (110 mph, 97 kn) at half-power
- Range: 2,700 km (1,700 mi, 1,500 nmi) maximum fuael
- Service ceiling: 6,500 m (21,300 ft) theoretical
- Time to altitude: 15 min 31 sec to 3,000 m (9,800 ft)
- Take-off speed: 100 km/h (62 mph; 54 kn)
- Take-off time: 18 sec

Armament

- Guns: 4×7.5 mm (0.30 in) Darne machine guns
- Bombs: maximum load 1,000 kg (2,200 lb)

== Bibliography ==
- Bousquet, Gérard (2013). French Flying Boats of WW II. Sandomierz, Poland: Stratus. ISBN 978-83-63678-06-7.
