= CAMS 120 =

General information
- Type: observation
- National origin: France
- Manufacturer: Les Chantiers Aéro-Maratimes de la Seine (CAMS)
- Designer: Maurice Hurel and Louis Coroller
- Number built: 1

History
- First flight: March 1935

The CAMS 120 was an observation amphibian built by CAMS in the 1930s. It was a high-wing monoplane of all-metal construction.

== Specifications ==
Data from Aviafrance: C.A.M.S. 120

General characteristics

- Crew: Three
- Length: 17.30 m (56 ft 9 in)
- Wingspan: 11.60 m (38 ft 1 in)
- Height: 3.73 m (12 ft 3 in)
- Wing area: 36 m^{2} (390 sq ft)
- Gross weight: 3,300 kg (7,275 lb)
- Powerplant: 1 × Hispano-Suiza 9Vbrs 9-cylinder, air-cooled radial piston engine, 540 kW (720 hp) , geared down 3:2
- Propellers: 2-bladed

Performance

- Maximum speed: 220 km/h (140 mph, 120 kn)
