= CAMS 80 =

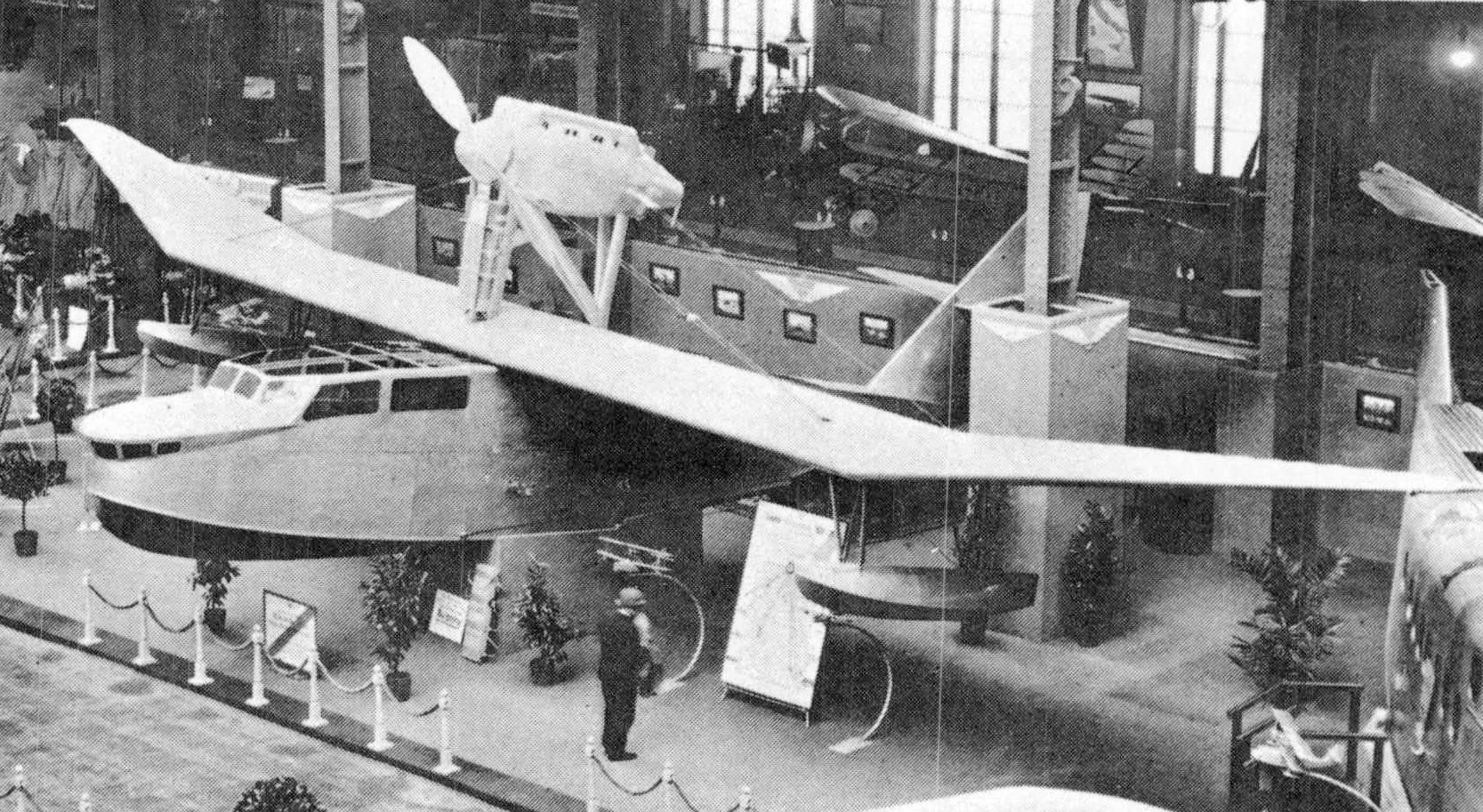

General information
- Type: maritime Reconnaissance aircraft
- National origin: France
- Manufacturer: Chantiers Aéro-Maritimes de la Seine (C.A.M.S.)
- Primary user: Aéronavale
- Number built: 2

History
- Introduction date: 1933
- First flight: 1932
- Retired: 1938

The CAMS 80 was an amphibious reconnaissance flying boat flown in the early 1930s. Two were built with different engines and were used by the Aéronavale for VIP transport and equipment development until 1938.

== Design and development ==
The all-metal CAMS 80 had a one-piece high wire-braced wing. This was built around two spars and had three distinct sections, with a long rectangular centre-section which occupied just over half the span and was mounted, without dihedral, on top of the fuselage. It was braced on each side by pairs of wires, upper ones running from the engine mounting to the spars at the end of the wing centre-section and below from the lower fuselage to the same points. Stabilizing floats on short struts were also positioned there. The outer sections were almost triangular, though with rounded tips and set with about 7° of dihedral to keep the tips clear of the water. Ailerons filled their trailing edges.

The CAMS 80 had a flat-sided fuselage. The planing underside was curved rather than V-shaped in cross-section and had two steps, one under the trailing edge of the wing and the other further aft. There was one open crew position in the nose, wrapped round with a long, shallow window and fitted with a flexible gun mounting. The pilots occupied an enclosed, multi-glazed cockpit ahead of the leading edge. Just behind the trailing edge there was another circular open gunner's-type position. At the rear the fin was broad and triangular with the tailplane, also triangular, mounted about half-way up. Both rudder and very high aspect ratio elevators were straight edged.

It was an amphibian with retractable wheels on cranked axles with rearward drag struts hinged from the fuselage sides and with near-vertical shock absorber legs. Other struts facilitated the raising of the wheels above the waterline but no details are known.

The CAMS 80 was powered by a single, tractor engine mounted centrally over the wing on pairs of narrow, transverse V-struts diagonally braced together; the forward pair contained a tall, tapered radiator. The engine was tilted slightly upwards and the propeller rotated over the wing. The two examples built were fitted with several different water-cooled engines. Whilst under construction in 1929 the first prototype was described as having a 340 kW (450 hp) Hispano engine, but was on display, unflown, at the 1930 Paris Salon, with a 520 kW (700 hp) Lorraine 18G Orion W-18 engine. The CAMS 80 was, however, first flown powered by a 480 kW (650 hp) Hispano 12Nbr V-12 engine in 1932. A second prototype, flown two years later, powered by a 640 kW (860 hp) Hispano 12Ydrs V-12, differed from the first aircraft in having an open cockpit.

== Operational history ==
In September 1933 the first prototype went into service with the French Naval Air Arm following fin modifications and the successful completion of its reception tests at the Saint Raphaël base. There, early in 1934, it was contributing to long running tests of Ratier variable pitch propellers. Take-off time was reduced from about 19 seconds to 13 seconds, an improvement of 28%. It was later used to transport VIPs. The second prototype joined it in the Air Arm, flight testing navigational instrumentation and radio equipment.

They were retired in 1938 because of corrosion.

== Operators ==
- France
  - Aéronavale

== Specifications (Lorraine 18G engine) ==
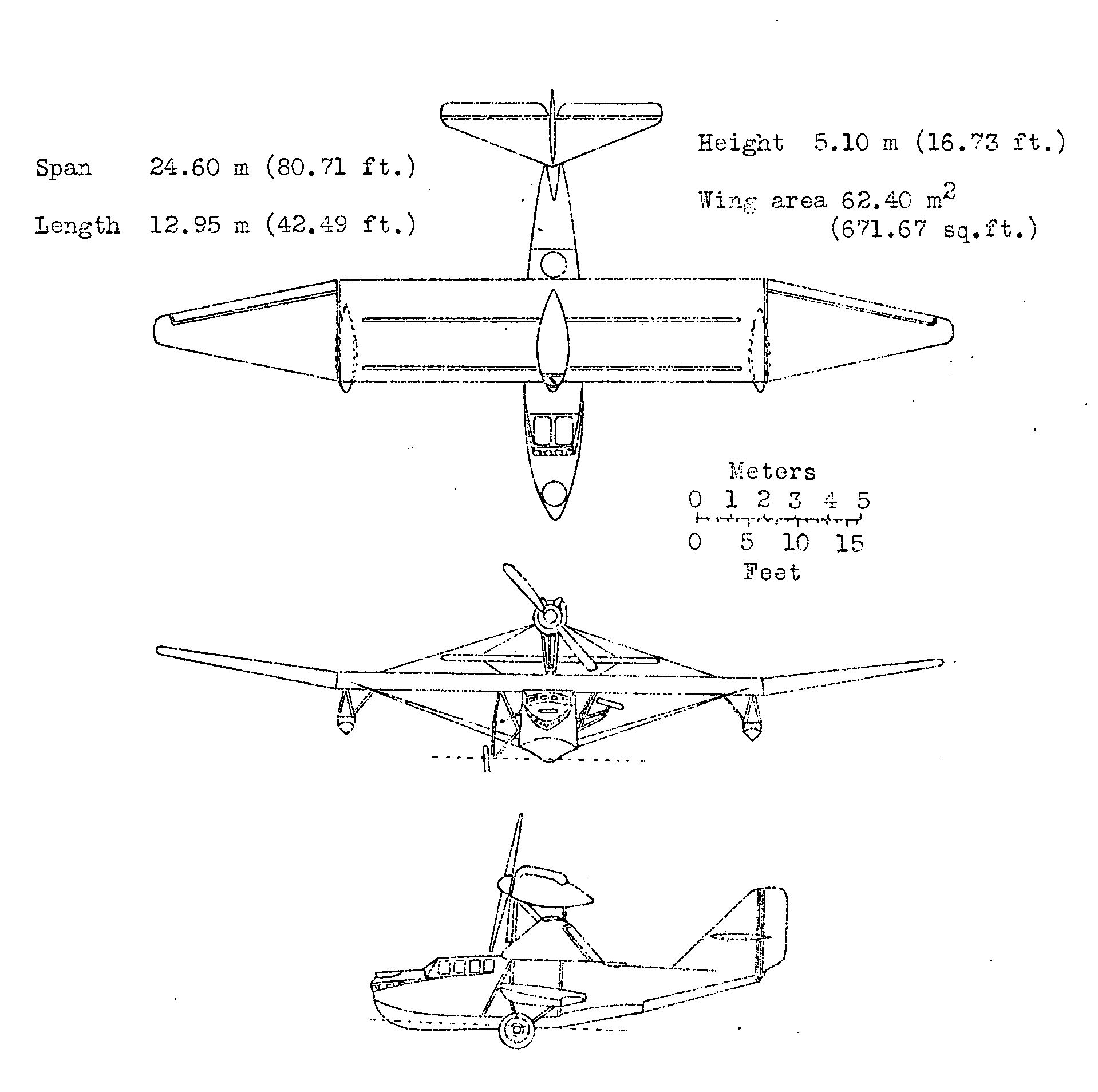
CAMS 80 3-view drawing from NACA aircraft Circular No.158

Data from General - L'Aérophile-Salon, November 1930

General characteristics

- Crew: Three
- Length: 12.95 m (42 ft 6 in)
- Wingspan: 24.60 m (80 ft 9 in)
- Height: 5.10 m (16 ft 9 in)
- Wing area: 62.4 m^{2} (672 sq ft)
- Empty weight: 2,625 kg (5,787 lb)
- Gross weight: 3,975 kg (8,763 lb)
- Fuel capacity: 1,060 L (230 imp gal; 280 US gal)
- Powerplant: 1 × Lorraine 18G Orion W-18 water-cooled piston engine, 520 kW (700 hp)
- Propellers: 2-bladed
