= CAMS 58 =

1930s French flying boat

58
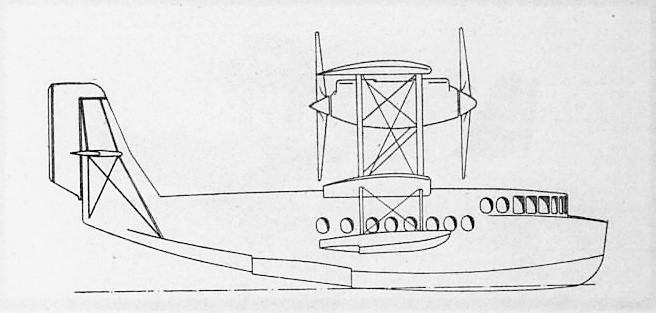
- CAMS 58/2

General information
- Type: Flying boat airliner
- Manufacturer: CAMS
- Primary user: Air France
- Number built: 4

History
- First flight: 1933

The CAMS 58 was a transport flying boat developed in France in the early 1930s as a successor to the successful CAMS 53. Compared to its predecessor, the CAMS 58 featured a newly designed biplane wing cellule and replaced the wooden hull with an all-metal one. Work was slow, with three years passing from the start of design work to the prototype's first flight. When the newly formed Air France showed no interest in purchasing the type, CAMS redesigned it to be powered by two pairs of engines in tractor-pusher installations. Again, no interest was forthcoming. The final iteration of the design, reverting to a single pair of more powerful engines and a wooden hull, met with only slightly more success. Air France purchased two aircraft and operated them briefly before deeming them uneconomical and withdrawing them from service.

== Variants ==
- 58/0 - Prototype powered by Hispano-Suiza 12Fa engines (one built)
- 58/2 - Four-engine version powered by Lorraine 9Na Algol engines (one built)
- 58/3 - Version equipped with Hispano-Suiza 12Nbr engines (two built)

== Specifications (58/3) ==
General characteristics

- Crew: 3
- Capacity: 4 passengers
- Length: 14.91 m (48 ft 11 in)
- Wingspan: 24.30 m (79 ft 9 in)
- Height: 6.14 m (20 ft 2 in)
- Wing area: 129.7 m^{2} (1,396 sq ft)
- Empty weight: 5,428 kg (11,967 lb)
- Gross weight: 8,450 kg (18,629 lb)
- Powerplant: 2 × Hispano-Suiza 12Nbr , 485 kW (650 hp) each

Performance

- Maximum speed: 200 km/h (125 mph, 109 kn)
- Range: 950 km (590 mi, 510 nmi)
- Service ceiling: 4,500 m (14,765 ft)
