= CAMS 36 =

Type of aircraft

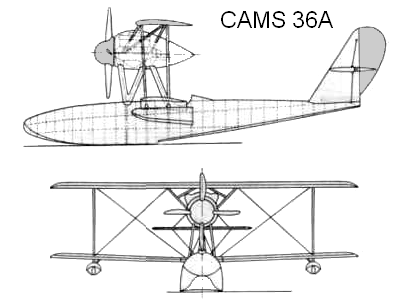

General information
- Type: Racing flying boat
- National origin: France
- Manufacturer: CAMS
- Number built: 2

History
- First flight: 1922
- Variant: CAMS 38

The CAMS 36 was a 1920s French flying boat designed and built by Chantiers Aéro-Maritimes de la Seine. It was originally conceived as a single-seat fighter but evolved as a racer to compete in the 1922 Schneider Trophy race. Lack of funds in 1922 and an accident in 1923 meant the two aircraft built failed to participate in a Schneider race.

== Design and development ==
Originally designed as a single-seat biplane flying-boat fighter, the CAMS 36 was modified to compete in the 1922 Schneider Trophy. Originally built with a pusher-propeller this was changed to a tractor arrangement for the 300 hp (224 kW) Hispano-Suiza 8Fd piston engine. Twin vertical wing bracing struts were changed to a single I-type strut. Although the racer proved to be fast in the air, lack of funds prevented the two aircraft from competing.

For the 1923 race one of the aircraft was modified with a larger 360 hp (268 kW) Hispano-Suiza 8Fd piston engine. The I-type struts were changed back to a more conventional arrangement. The new variant was designated the CAM 36bis. On the day of the contest, the 36bis, piloted by Lieutenant Pelletier d'Oisy, collided with a yacht at anchor on the Solent and the damaged aircraft was prevented from racing.

== Variants ==
CAMS 36
Prototype flying-boat fighter
CAMS 36
Modified for racing and powered by a 300 hp (224 kW) Hispano-Suiza 8Fd engine.
CAMS 36bis
Further modifications for the 1923 race, powered by a 360 hp (268 kW) Hispano-Suiza 8Fd engine.

== Specifications (CAMS 36 racer) ==
Data from The Illustrated Encyclopedia of Aircraft

General characteristics

- Crew: one
- Length: 7.75 m (25 ft 5 in)
- Wingspan: 8.60 m (28 ft 3 in)
- Height: 2.80 m (9 ft 2 in)
- Wing area: 20.00 m^{2} (215.3 sq ft)
- Empty weight: 945 kg (2,083 lb)
- Max takeoff weight: 1,260 kg (2,778 lb)
- Powerplant: 1 × Hispano-Suiza 8Fd inline piston, 220 kW (300 hp)

Performance

- Maximum speed: 250 km/h (160 mph, 130 kn)
