= CAMS 50 =

1920s French flying boat

General information
- Type: maritime bombardment aircraft
- National origin: France
- Manufacturer: Chantiers Aéro-Maritimes de la Seine (C.A.M.S.)

History
- First flight: 1926

The CAMS 50 was an amphibious bomber flying boat flown in the late 1920s. It used a monocoque fuselage, and the engines were arranged in a tandem configuration.

== Specifications ==
Data from

General characteristics

- Crew: 3
- Length: 14.90 m (48 ft 11 in)
- Wingspan: 20.20 m (66 ft 3 in)
- Height: 5.70 m (18 ft 8 in)
- Powerplant: 2 × Gnome & Rhône 9Ae 9-cylinder V-shaped inline piston engine, 130 kW (180 hp) each
- Propellers: 2-bladed
- Maximum speed: 217 km/h (135 mph, 117 kn)
