= Grinvalds Orion =

Orion
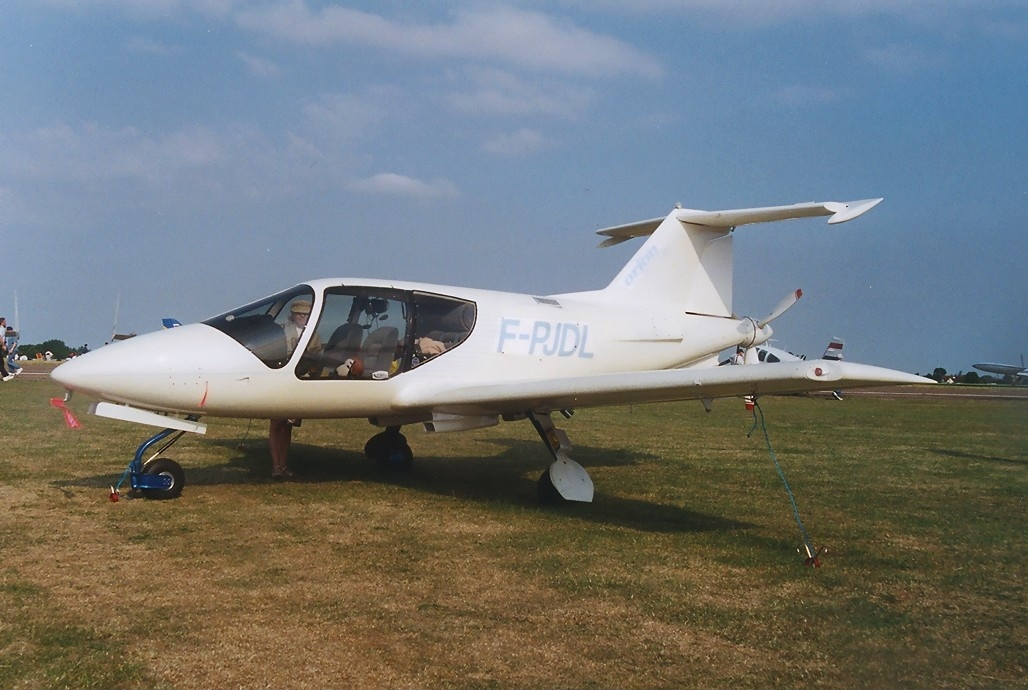
- Grinvalds G.801 Orion

General information
- Type: 4-seat homebuilt aircraft
- National origin: France
- Designer: Jānis (John) Grinvalds
- Number built: more than 17

History
- First flight: 2 June 1981

The Grinvalds Orion is one of the earliest (1981) composite kit- and homebuilt aircraft. A 2/4 seater with a single pusher engine, it was built in France and the United States in small numbers with several variations.

== Design and development ==
Designed in 1975 and first flown in 1981, the Orion was one of the earliest kitbuilt aircraft to be constructed from composite materials. It is a low wing cantilever monoplane with a T-tail, of conventional layout except for its pusher configuration; this places the cabin well ahead of the leading edge and provides an excellent downward view. The Orion is built from Kevlar reinforced glassfibre shells, with foam filling in the wings. The latter, which have 4.5° of dihedral, are straight edged and only slightly tapered, with blunt tips. They carry electrically driven split flaps. Its cabin seats four in two side-by-side rows and is entered by centrally hinged gull wing doors. The engine, a Lycoming O-360 variant of either 180 hp or 200 hp (134/149 kW) is mounted over the wing trailing edge line and drives a three-bladed propeller, mounted at the extreme tail, via a long shaft. Behind the wing the fuselage tapers on its underside; it carries a broad fin with a straight, swept leading edge and rudder, on top of which is the straight, tapered tailplane and horn balanced elevators. Below the fuselage is a long, shallow ventral strake. The tricycle undercarriage is electrically retractable. The main legs fold inwards; when deployed, they splay out strongly.

== Operational history ==
The first prototype of the plan-built G-801 Orion flew for the first time on 2 June 1981, configured as a two-seater and powered by a 65 hp (48.5 kW) engine. The first kit-production aircraft, designated G-802 Orion, differed from the G-801 chiefly by having a wider cabin and a slightly longer fuselage (increased by 140 mm or 5.5 in). This first flew in November 1983, powered by a 180 hp Lycoming. By early 1985 140 plans for G-801s and 80 G-802 kits had been sold, but the development programme was halted by the death of its designer on 3 April 1985 whilst demonstrating the aircraft.

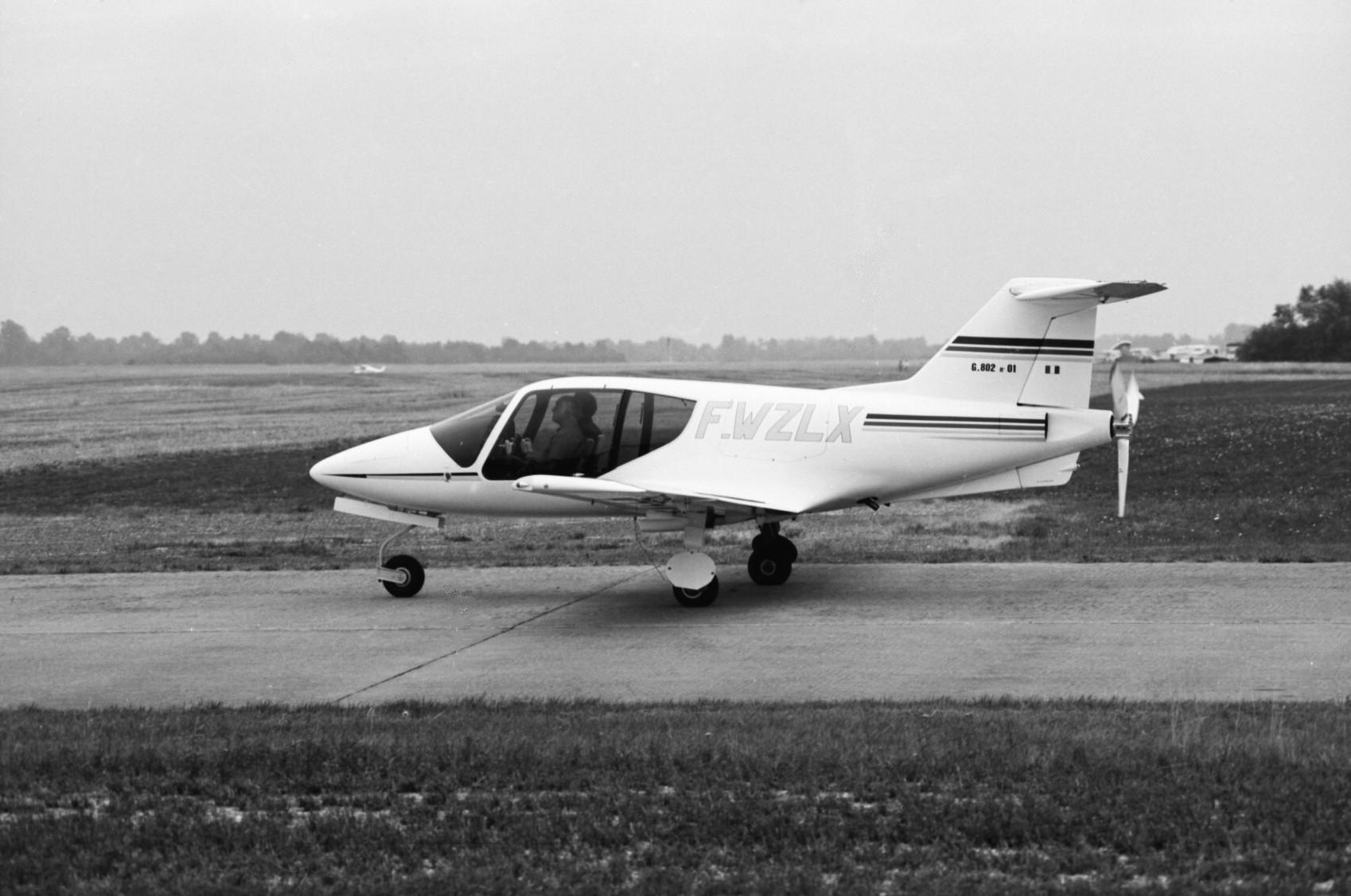
Grinvald G-802 Orion

Plans and kits were distributed by Aérodis in France and by Aerodis America Inc. in the USA. Individual builders, often using the original moulds at Brienne-le-Chateau, continued to innovate. Around 1990 Jaques Darcissac built an Orion with a fuselage strengthened with wire mesh and with a more robust undercarriage, which he named the Darcissac-Grinvalds DG-87 Goéland (Seagull in English) and this name has been used by three other builders. Other builders have also given their aircraft different names, such as Gerfaut, Gypaète and Scorpion.

In 1988, Aerodis America commissioned a design for a new light aircraft from David Thurston, which they called the AA200 Orion. Although the AA200 and the G-801 shared a same basic configuration and composite construction, the two aircraft were not further related, and the AA200 was an all-new design.

By the end of 2008 about 17 Orion variants had been flown, with another nine under construction. Most have been registered in France, though three are on the US register.

== Aircraft on display ==
The first prototype 801 Orion, F-PYKF, is normally in the Musée de l'Air et de l'Espace, Le Bourget Airport, Paris where it can be viewed with advance permission,

== Specifications (Gerfaut G802B or Orion G801) ==
Data from Jane's All the World's Aircraft 2010-11: performance estimated

General characteristics

- Crew: One (pilot)
- Capacity: Three passengers
- Length: 7.75 m (25 ft 5 in)
- Wingspan: 8.90 m (29 ft 2 in)
- Height: 2.60 m (8 ft 6 in)
- Wing area: 11.22 m^{2} (120.8 sq ft)
- Aspect ratio: 7.1
- Airfoil: NACA 43015 root, NACA 43012 tip
- Empty weight: 730 kg (1,609 lb)
- Max takeoff weight: 1,150 kg (2,535 lb)
- Fuel capacity: 200 L (44.0 imp gal, 52.8 US gal)
- Powerplant: 1 × Lycoming O-360 flat four cylinder, air cooled, 150 kW (200 hp)
- Propellers: 3-bladed Evra adjustable, MT prop electric or Ivoprop

Performance

- Maximum speed: 330 km/h (210 mph, 180 kn)at 75% power
- Stall speed: 90 km/h (56 mph, 49 kn) flaps down
- Range: 1,250 km (780 mi, 670 nmi)
- Service ceiling: 4,500 m (14,800 ft) service
- Rate of climb: 5.1 m/s (1,000 ft/min) initial

== See also ==
Related lists

- List of pusher aircraft by configuration
