= SIAI S.8 =

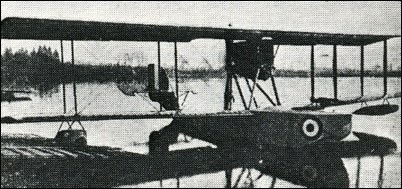

General information
- Type: Reconnaissance flying boat
- Manufacturer: SIAI
- Designer: Raffaele Conflenti
- Primary user: Regia Marina
- Number built: 214

History
- First flight: 1917

The SIAI S.8 was an Italian 1910s two-seat reconnaissance flying boat.

== Design and development ==
The Societa Idrovolanti Alta Italia (SIAI) was formed in 1915 initially to build French flying boats under license. The company employed Raffaele Conflenti as chief designer and his first design was the SIAI S.8, a two-seat equal-span biplane flying boat, first flown in 1917. The Royal Italian Navy ordered 800 S.8s, to be built by SIAI and subcontractors. With the end of the war, production was stopped when 172 aircraft had been delivered. Early aircraft were powered by an Isotta Fraschini V4B engine, later aircraft had the more powerful 220 hp (164 kW) Hispano-Suiza 44.

== Operational history ==
The aircraft equipped five squadrons of the Regia Marina. By 1920 only 63 aircraft survived, mostly in storage.

== Operators ==
Kingdom of Italy

- Regia Marina

== Specifications (S.8) ==
Data from

General characteristics

- Crew: 2
- Length: 9.84 m (32 ft 3 in)
- Wingspan: 12.77 m (41 ft 11 in)
- Height: 3.3 m (10 ft 10 in)
- Wing area: 46 m^{2} (500 sq ft)
- Empty weight: 900 kg (1,984 lb)
- Max takeoff weight: 1,375 kg (3,031 lb)
- Powerplant: 1 × Isotta Fraschini V.4B 6-cylinder water-cooled in-line piston engine, 134 kW (180 hp)
- Propellers: 2-bladed fixed-pitch pusher propeller

Performance

- Maximum speed: 144 km/h (89 mph, 78 kn)
- Range: 700 km (430 mi, 380 nmi)
- Service ceiling: 6,000 m (20,000 ft)

Armament

- Guns: 1x 7.7mm (0.303 in) machine gun in bow cockpit
- Bombs: up to 265 lb (120 kg) of bombs

== See also ==
Related lists

- List of seaplanes and flying boats
