= CAMS 33 =

Flying boat built in France

33
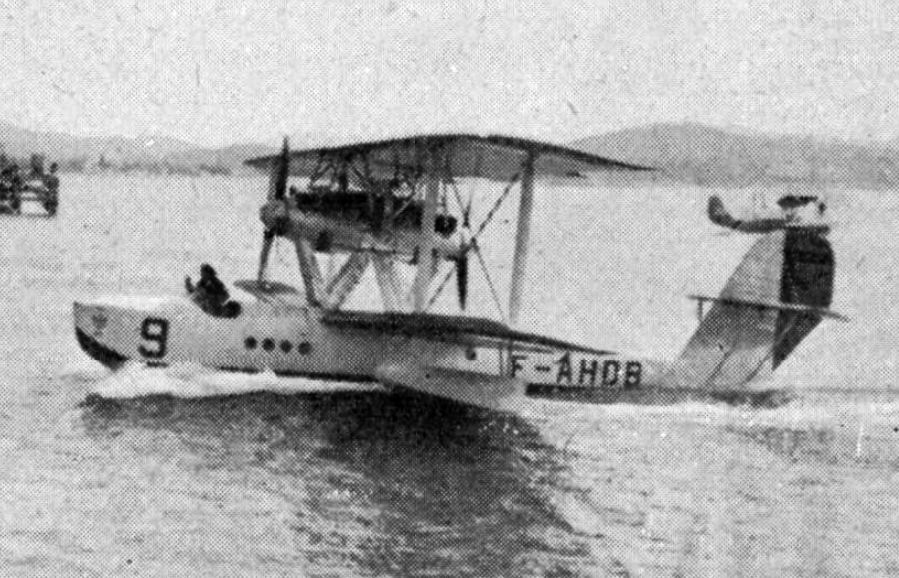
- CAMS 33C

General information
- Type: Reconnaissance flying boat
- Manufacturer: CAMS
- Designer: Raffaele Conflenti
- Number built: 21

History
- First flight: 1923

The CAMS 33 was a reconnaissance flying boat built in France in the early 1920s. It was designed in response to a French Navy requirement for new flying boats for various roles.

== Design and development ==
Chantiers Aéro-Maritimes de la Seine (CAMS) submitted prototype aircraft in two categories for the Navy requirement - as both a reconnaissance aircraft and a transport. The design was a conventional biplane flying boat with equal-span unstaggered wings and two engines mounted in a single nacelle in tractor-pusher configuration on struts in the interplane gap. Accommodation consisted of an open cockpit for two, plus open bow and dorsal gun positions on the reconnaissance machine, or an enclosed cabin for seven passengers on the transport version.

== Operational history ==
The transport (33C or 33T) was passed over, but the armed reconnaissance version was accepted for production as the 33B. Twelve aircraft were eventually produced for the French Navy, these equipping Escadrille 1R1 at Cherbourg-Chantereyne. Yugoslavia purchased another six machines. The 33T prototype flew under civil registration for a few years, but was unable to attract customers.

== Operators ==
France

- French Navy

Kingdom of Yugoslavia

== Specifications (33B) ==
General characteristics

- Crew: three-four
- Length: 13.23 m (43 ft 5 in)
- Wingspan: 17.62 m (57 ft 10 in)
- Height: 4.88 m (16 ft 0 in)
- Gross weight: 4,000 kg (8,818 lb)
- Powerplant: 2 × Hispano-Suiza 8F , 208 kW (275 hp) each

Performance

- Maximum speed: 175 km/h (109 mph, 95 kn)
- Range: 820 km (510 mi, 440 nmi)
- Endurance: 18 hours 0 minutes
- Service ceiling: 5,000 m (16,405 ft)

Armament

- 1 × trainable .303 Lewis gun in bow position
- 1 × trainable .303 Lewis gun in dorsal position
- 300 kg (660 lb) of bombs carried under lower wing
