= CAMS 90 =

1930s French flying boat

General information
- Type: maritime observation
- National origin: France
- Manufacturer: Chantiers Aéro-Maritimes de la Seine (C.A.M.S.)
- Number built: 1

History
- First flight: 1932

The CAMS 90 was an amphibious observation flying boat built in the early 1930s. The wings were made of wood, but the hull was of all-metal construction. The Lorraine Mizar engine was mounted in a pusher configuration.

== Specifications ==
Data from

General characteristics

- Crew: 3
- Length: 9.07 m (29 ft 9 in)
- Wingspan: 13.00 m (42 ft 8 in)
- Height: 3.59 m (11 ft 9 in)
- Wing area: 41.98 m^{2} (451.9 sq ft)
- Empty weight: 1,095 kg (2,414 lb)
- Gross weight: 1,600 kg (3,527 lb)
- Powerplant: 1 × Lorraine 7Me Mizar 7-cylinder V-shaped inline piston engine, 180 kW (240 hp)
- Propellers: 2-bladed
- Maximum speed: 186 km/h (116 mph, 100 kn)
- Range: 440 km (270 mi, 240 nmi)
- Service ceiling: 5,700 m (18,700 ft)
