= Chantiers Aéro-Maritimes de la Seine =

French manufacturer of flying boats

- Industry: Aeronautics, defence
- Founded: 1920
- Founder: Lawrence Santoni
- Defunct: 1 February 1937
- Fate: Merged
- Successor: SNCASE
- Headquarters: France
- Products: Aircraft

Chantiers Aéro-Maritimes de la Seine (CAMS) was a French manufacturer of flying boats, founded in Saint-Ouen in November 1920 by Lawrence Santoni.

== History ==
Initially the company built Società Idrovolanti Alta Italia (SIAI) designs under licence, but in 1922 it lured Raffaele Conflenti away from SIAI to become head designer, after which it generated its own aircraft designs. CAMS' most noteworthy products were flying boat designs that saw widespread long-term use in the French Navy.

The company was nationalized in 1936, following which it was merged with Chantiers aéronavals Étienne Romano, Lioré et Olivier, Potez and SPCA in order to form the Société nationale des constructions aéronautiques du Sud-Est (SNCASE) on 1 February 1937.

== Aircraft ==
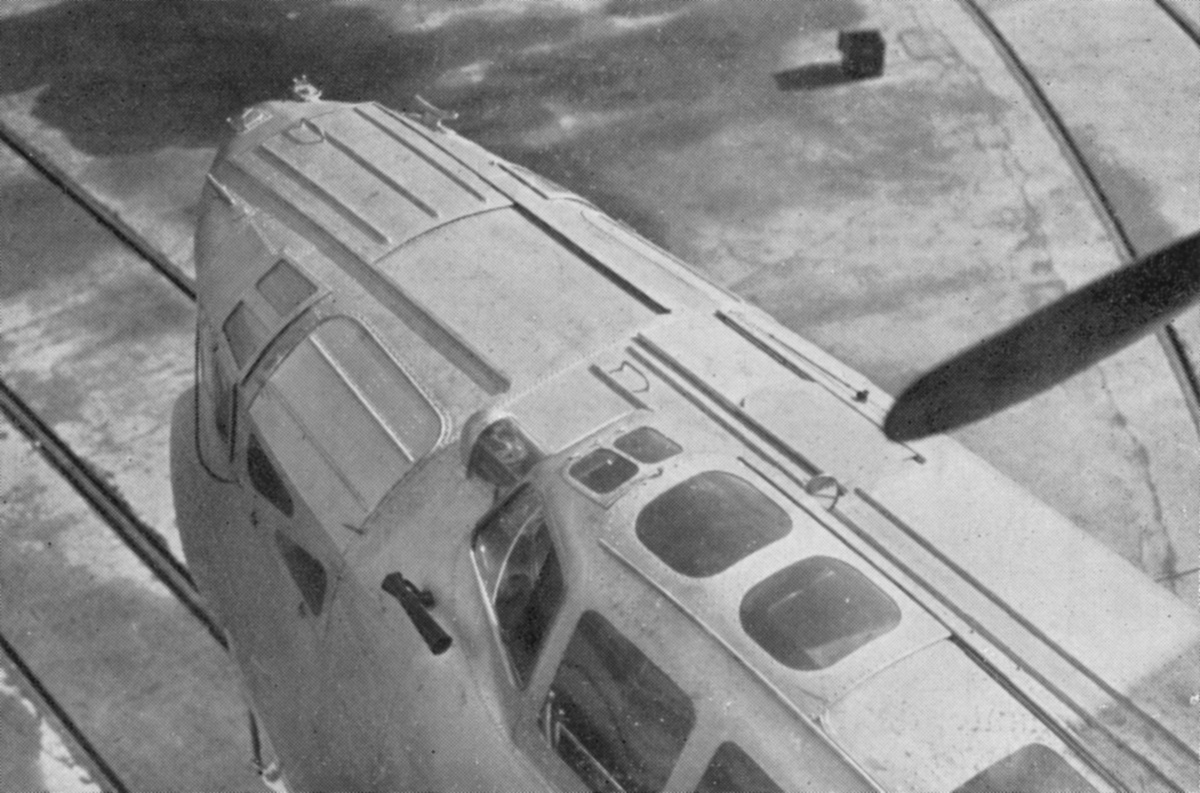
Nose of the seaplane C.A.M.S. 110

- CAMS 30E (1923) - single-engine, two-seat biplane flying boat used for training
- CAMS 30T (1924) - single-engine, four-seat biplane flying boat derived from the CAMS 30. It was used in 1924 to set a speed record for passenger-carrying flying boats
- CAMS 31 (1922) - prototype flying boat
- CAMS 33B (1923) - two-engine, four-seat push-pull biplane reconnaissance flying boat
- CAMS 33T (1923) - two-engine, nine-seat push-pull biplane personnel transport flying boat
- CAMS 34 (1920s) - projected transport derivative of CAMS 30
- CAMS 35 (1920s) - projected military derivative of CAMS 30
- CAMS 36 (1922) - single seat racer
- CAMS 37 (1926) - single-engine, two-seat biplane trainer/utility flying boat
- CAMS 38 (1923) - single seat racer
- CAMS 41 (1924) - flying boat bomber study
- CAMS 42 (1924) - flying boat bomber study, also called CAMS 41bis
- CAMS 43 - two-engine military flying boat, developed from the CAMS 41 project
- CAMS 44 (1925) - heavy flying boat torpedo bomber project
- CAMS 45 (1925) - flying boat racer project
- CAMS 46E (1926) - basic flying boat trainer
- CAMS 46ET (1926) - intermediate flying boat trainer for Aeronavale
- CAMS 50 (1927) - two-engine, three-seat transport flying boat prototype
- CAMS 51 (1926) - two-engine, six-seat push-pull biplane transport flying boat
- CAMS 52 (1929) - two-engine, floatplane torpedo bomber prototype
- CAMS 53 (I) (1928) - projected reconnaissance/torpedo bomber version of CAMS 50
- CAMS 53 (1929) - two-engine, six-seat push-pull biplane transport flying boat version of CAMS 50
- CAMS 54 (1928) - long range push-pull biplane flying boat
- CAMS 55 (1929) - two-engine biplane reconnaissance flying boat, derived from the CAMS 51
- CAMS 56 (1928) - as CAMS 53 but powered by Gnome and Rhone 9A engines, formerly designated CAMS 53-3
- CAMS 57 (1929) - as CAMS 53 but powered by Renault 12Jb engines, formerly designated CAMS 53R
- CAMS 58 (1930) - two-engine, seven-seat flying boat airliner
- CAMS 59 - three-engine monoplane torpedo bomber floatplane project derived from the CAMS 52
- CAMS 60 (1930) - two-seat high wing monoplane torpedo bomber project
- CAMS 70 (1928) - reconnaissance flying boat project
- CAMS 71 - two-engine or four-engine monoplane transatlantic/military patrol flying boat project

=== Potez-CAMS aircraft ===
- CAMS 80 (1932) - single-engine reconnaissance flying boat
- CAMS 90 (1931) - single-engine light utility flying boat
- CAMS 91 - projected version of CAMS 90, powered by a Hispano 9Q or Gnome and Rhone Titan Major engine
- Potez-CAMS 100 (1935) - six-engine transatlantic flying boat airliner project
- Potez-CAMS 110 (1934) - two-engine, push-pull biplane transport flying boat, only the single prototype was built
- Potez-CAMS 120 (1935) - three-seat single-engine patrol flying boat
- Potez-CAMS 130 (1935) - catapult launched four-engine, 35 passenger flying boat airliner project
- Potez-CAMS 141 (1938) - four-engine long range reconnaissance flying boat
- Potez-CAMS 142 - transatlantic flying boat airliner based on the CAMS 141
- Potez-CAMS 150 (1935) - six-engine transatlantic flying boat airline project
- Potez-CAMS 160 (1938) - scale model flying boat, used for hydrodynamic and aerodynamic testing of the Potez-CAMS 161
- Potez-CAMS 161 (1939 or 1942) - six-engine flying boat airliner
- Potez-CAMS 162 - projected military transport version of Potez-CAMS 161
- Potez-CAMS 170 (1939) - single-seat seaplane fighter project
