= CAMS 31 =

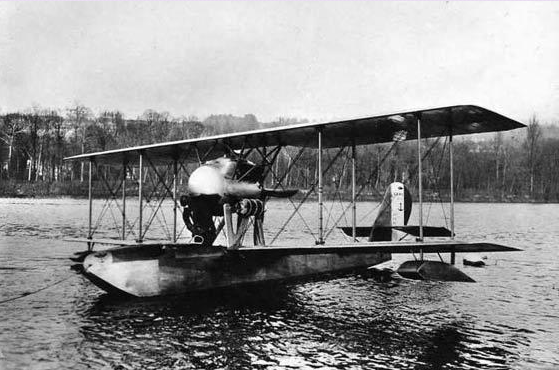

General information
- Type: Single-seat fighter flying-boat
- National origin: France
- Manufacturer: CAMS
- Number built: 2

History
- First flight: 1922

The CAMS 31 was a 1920s French single-seat fighter biplane flying-boat designed and built by Chantiers Aéro-Maritimes de la Seine (CAMS).

== Design and development ==
The CAMS 31 was a wooden-built two-bay equal span biplane with stabilising floats under each wing and an open cockpit forward of the lower-wing for the pilot. Powered by a Hispano-Suiza 8Fb inline piston engine driving a pusher propeller, the engine was strut mounted between the wings. The CAMS 31 was armed with two fixed hull-mounted Vickers machine-guns in the bow.

The CAMS 31 prototype, later designated the CAMS 31 Type 22, first flew in 1922. A second prototype, the CAMS 31 Type 23, flew in 1923 with a reduced-span wing and wider chord but still had the same wing area as the Type 22. Testing proved the flying-boats handled well but were just not suitable as fighters and no more were built.

A mail carrying postal variant was designated CAMS 31P

== Variants ==
CAMS 31 Type 22
Original wing
CAMS 31 Type 23
Reduced span extended chord wing of same area
CAMS 31M
Proposed production fighter, not proceeded with.
CAMS 31P
Postal variant

== Specifications (CAMS 31 Type 22) ==
Data from

General characteristics

- Crew: 1
- Length: 8.80 m (28 ft 10 in)
- Wingspan: 11.20 m (36 ft 9 in)
- Height: 3.05 m (10 ft 0 in)
- Wing area: 33.00 m^{2} (355.2 sq ft)
- Empty weight: 1,045 kg (2,304 lb)
- Max takeoff weight: 1,505 kg (3,318 lb)
- Powerplant: 1 × Hispano-Suiza 8Fb inline piston engine, 220 kW (300 hp)

Performance

- Maximum speed: 200 km/h (120 mph, 110 kn) at sea level
- Range: 400 km (250 mi, 220 nmi)

Armament

- Guns: 2 × fixed bow-mounted Vickers machine guns

== See also ==
Related lists

- List of flying boats and floatplanes
