= CAMS 30E =

Flying boat built in France

CAMS 30
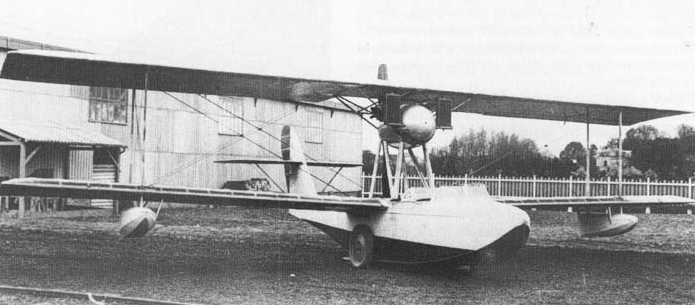
- A CAMS 30E

General information
- Type: Flying boat trainer
- Manufacturer: CAMS
- Designer: Raffaele Conflenti
- Number built: 31

History
- First flight: 1922
- Variants: CAMS 46ET

The CAMS 30E was a two-seat flying boat trainer built in France in the early 1920s. It was the first aircraft designed for CAMS by Raffaele Conflenti after he had been recruited by the company from his previous job at Società Idrovolanti Alta Italia (SIAI). It was a conventional design for the era featuring a two-bay equal-span unstaggered biplane wing cellule. The prototype was exhibited at the 1922 Salon de l'Aéronautique and evaluated the following year by the Aéronautique Maritime. The type's favourable performance led to an order of 22 machines for the French military and an export order of seven for Yugoslavia and four for Poland.

A single civil example was produced as the CAMS 30T with two extra passenger seats. In August 1924, Ernest Burri used this machine to break the world air speed record for a passenger-carrying seaplane.

== Variants ==
- CAMS 30E - Production military flying-boat trainer.
- CAMS 30T - Passenger version of the CAMS30E with two extra seats.

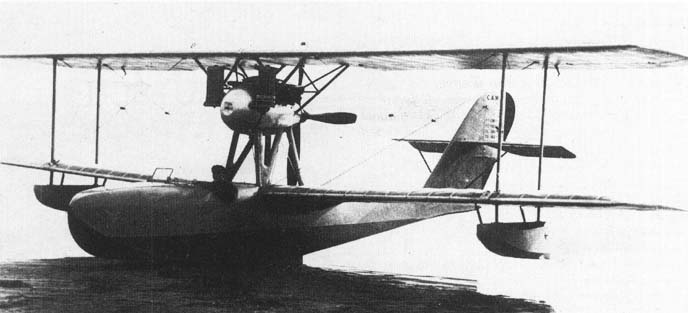
A CAMS 30T

== Operators ==
France

- Aeronautique Maritime

Kingdom of Yugoslavia

- Yugoslav Royal Navy

Poland

== Specifications (30E) ==
Data from Jane's all the World's Aircraft 1924, Aviafrance:CAMS 30E

General characteristics

- Crew: 2
- Length: 9.28 m (30 ft 5 in)
- Wingspan: 12.4 m (40 ft 8 in)
- Height: 3.12 m (10 ft 3 in)
- Wing area: 43 m^{2} (460 sq ft)
- Empty weight: 885 kg (1,951 lb)
- Gross weight: 1,180 kg (2,601 lb)
- Powerplant: 1 × Hispano-Suiza 8Aa V-8 water-cooled piston engine, 110 kW (150 hp)

Performance

- Maximum speed: 153 km/h (95 mph, 83 kn)
- Wing loading: 27.5 kg/m^{2} (5.6 lb/sq ft)
- Power/mass: 0.0893 kW/kg (0.0543 hp/lb)

== Bibliography ==
- Cortet, Pierre (November 1999). "Les hydroavions CAMS 30^{E}" [The CAMS 30E Seaplane]. Avions: Toute l'Aéronautique et son histoire (in French) (80): 20–23. ISSN 1243-8650.
- Isaic, Vladimir (May 1999). "Les hydroavions CAMS 30e en Yugoslavie" [Yugoslav CAMS 30e Seaplanes]. Avions: Toute l'Aéronautique et son histoire (in French) (74): 42–49. ISSN 1243-8650.
- Nelcarz, Bartolomiej & Peczkowski, Robert (April 2000). "Les appareils français dans la Marine Polonaise" [French Aircraft of the Polish Navy]. Avions: Toute l'Aéronautique et son histoire (in French) (85): 22–27. ISSN 1243-8650.
- Taylor, Michael J. H. (1989). Jane's Encyclopedia of Aviation. London: Studio Editions. p. 225.
- World Aircraft Information Files. London: Bright Star Publishing. pp. File 891 Sheet 01.
