= Dickey E-Racer =

American homebuilt aircraft

E-Racer
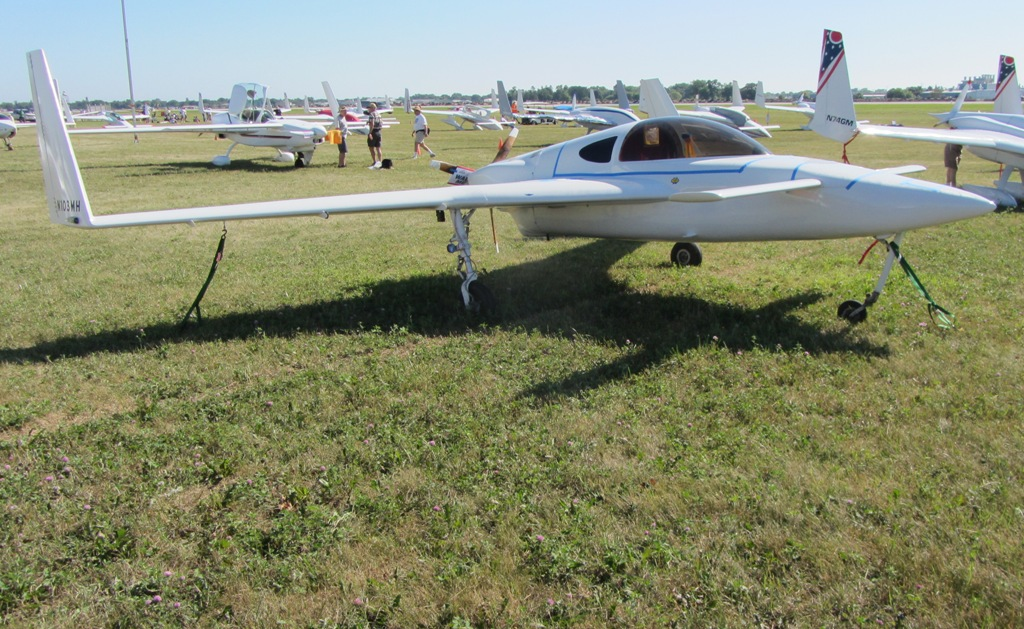
- Modified E-Racer

General information
- Type: Homebuilt aircraft
- National origin: United States
- Manufacturer: Shirl Dickey Enterprises
- Designer: Shirl Dickey
- Status: Production completed
- Number built: at least 15

History
- First flight: 1984
- Developed from: Rutan Long-EZ

The Dickey E-Racer, also called the Sierra Delta E-Racer, is an American homebuilt aircraft that was designed by Shirl Dickey and produced by Shirl Dickey Enterprises of Phoenix, Arizona. It was first flown in 1984. When it was available the aircraft was supplied in the form of plans for amateur construction, with some parts available to facilitate faster construction.

== Design and development ==
The aircraft is based upon the Rutan Long-EZ. It features a cantilever mid-wing canard layout with tip rudders, a two-seats-in-side-by-side configuration enclosed cockpit under a bubble canopy, fully retractable tricycle landing gear and a single engine in pusher configuration.

The aircraft is made from E-glass. Its 26.2 ft (8.0 m) span wing has a wing area of 94.00 sq ft (8.733 m^{2}) and employs a Roncz R1145MS airfoil for the canard airfoil, and the main wing uses a modified Eppler 1230 airfoil. The standard engine used in the Mark 1 is the 240 hp (179 kW) Buick V-8 automotive conversion powerplant.

The aircraft has a typical empty weight of 1,000 lb (450 kg) and a gross weight of 1,800 lb (820 kg), giving a useful load of 700 lb (320 kg). With full fuel of 46 U.S. gallons (170 L; 38 imp gal) the payload for pilot, passenger and baggage is 424 lb (192 kg).

Like most canard designs the E-Racer has a long take-off and landing roll. The standard day, sea level take-off roll is 1,200 ft (366 m). The landing roll is 1,500 ft (457 m).

At one time pre-fabricated wings and canard were available to speed construction. The manufacturer estimates the construction time from the supplied plans as 2000 hours.

== Operational history ==
By 1998 the company reported that four aircraft were flying and six by 1999.

As of December 2013, 15 examples were registered in the United States with the Federal Aviation Administration.

== Variants ==
E-Racer Mark 1
Initial version powered by a 240 hp (179 kW) Buick V-8 automotive conversion powerplant
E-Racer Mark 2
Later version powered by aircraft engine powerplants
King Racer
Later version with a larger cockpit

== Specifications (E-Racer Mark 1) ==
Data from AeroCrafter, The Incomplete Guide to Airfoil Usage and KitPlanes

General characteristics

- Crew: one
- Capacity: one passenger
- Length: 16 ft 9.6 in (5.121 m)
- Wingspan: 26 ft 2.4 in (7.986 m)
- Height: 7 ft 9.6 in (2.377 m)
- Wing area: 94.00 sq ft (8.733 m^{2})
- Airfoil: root: Roncz R1145MS tip: Eppler 1230 mod
- Empty weight: 1,100 lb (499 kg)
- Gross weight: 1,800 lb (816 kg)
- Fuel capacity: 46 U.S. gallons (170 L; 38 imp gal)
- Powerplant: 1 × Buick V-8, water-cooled, four stroke automotive conversion engine, 240 hp (180 kW)
- Propellers: 2-bladed wooden

Performance

- Maximum speed: 250 mph (400 km/h, 220 kn)
- Cruise speed: 225 mph (362 km/h, 196 kn)
- Range: 1,000 mi (1,600 km, 870 nmi)
- Service ceiling: 25,000 ft (7,600 m)
- Rate of climb: 2,500 ft/min (13 m/s)
- Wing loading: 19.1 lb/sq ft (93 kg/m^{2})
