= CAMS 38 =

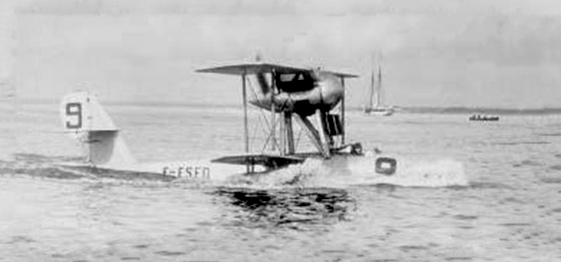

General information
- Type: Single-seat racing flying-boat
- National origin: France
- Manufacturer: CAMS
- Designer: Raffaele Conflenti
- Number built: 1

The CAMS 38 was a French single-seat racing flying-boat designed by Raffaele Conflenti and built by Chantiers Aéro-Maritimes de la Seine (CAMS) for the 1923 Schneider Trophy race. The CAMS 38 was withdrawn from the race during the second lap.

== Design and development ==
The CAMS 38 was a single-seat equal-span biplane with a 380 hp (283 kW) Hispano-Suiza 8Fd Spécial inline piston engine faired into the underside of the upper wing. The engine drove a two-bladed pusher propeller. The single-seat cockpit was located forward of the wing leading edge towards the front of the hull.

The CAMS 38 was flown in the 1923 Schneider Trophy race by the company's chief test pilot Maurice Hurel. It was damaged by a wave before takeoff but completed the first lap. During the second lap Hurel was forced to land with a vibrating engine and loss of power. During the following year the aircraft was used for flight trials but was soon scrapped.

== Specifications ==
Data from The Illustrated Encyclopedia of Aircraft

General characteristics

- Crew: one
- Length: 8.32 m (27 ft 3.5 in)
- Wingspan: 8.60 m (28 ft 2.5 in)
- Height: 2.79 m (9 ft 1.75 in)
- Wing area: 202.37 m^{2} (18.80 sq ft)
- Empty weight: 940 kg (2,072 lb)
- Gross weight: 1,256 kg (2,769 lb)
- Powerplant: 1 × Hispano-Suiza 12Fd Spécial V-12 inline piston engine , 283 kW (380 hp)

Performance

- Maximum speed: 300 km/h (186 mph, 162 kn)

== See also ==
Related lists

- List of flying boats and floatplanes
