= Raffaele Conflenti =

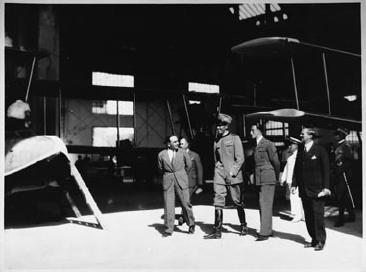
- Raffaele Conflenti accompanies Prince Amedeo, Duke of Aosta (the tall man in a uniform) on a tour of a hangar.
- Born: 4 December 1889; Cosenza, Kingdom of Italy
- Died: 16 July 1946 (aged 56); Cosenza, Italy
- Occupations: Aeronautical engineer, aircraft designer

Raffaele Conflenti (4 December 1889 – 16 July 1946) was an Italian aeronautical engineer and aircraft designer. During his career, he worked for some of the most important seaplane manufacturers in Italy and designed a large number of aircraft including civil and military flying boats, record-breaking seaplanes and land trainers and fighters.

== Biography ==
Conflenti was born in Cosenza, then part of the Kingdom of Italy, on 4 December 1889. He graduated in engineering and in 1912 he started working for Società Italiana Transaerea (Italian Trans-Aeronautical Company, or SIT) in Turin. He then worked for Domenico Santoni's Società Costruzioni Aeronautiche Savoia (Savoia Aeronautical Works Company) in Milan and later he became the technical director of SIAI (Società Idrovolanti Alta Italia, Italian for Seaplane Company of Northern Italy), the company Santoni had founded in 1914 together with businessman Luigi Capè. SIAI was headquartered in Sesto Calende, on Lake Maggiore.

Conflenti, who had initially supervised the production of license-built Blériot, Maurice Farman and Henri Farman aircraft, now turned to FBA types. In 1917, however, his first original design—the SIAI S.8—made its maiden flight. Conflenti designed several other aircraft for SIAI before Santoni suddenly left SIAI and moved to Saint-Ouen, in the suburbs of Paris, where in 1921 he founded a new company named CAMS (Chantiers Aéro-Maritimes de la Seine, French for Aircraft and Shipping Yards of the Seine); Conflenti followed Santoni a few months later and became the technical director of CAMS. CAMS initially built SIAI aircraft under license, but Conflenti soon started designing new types of seaplanes, including record-breaking CAMS 30T and CAMS 36.

Conflenti left CAMS in 1923 and he went back to Italy, where he became the head designer of the newly founded aeronautical section of CNT (Cantiere Navale Triestino, Italian for Shipyard of Trieste), headquartered in Monfalcone. He held that position until 1932 (in the meantime, CNT had merged with Stabilimento Tecnico Triestino giving birth to Cantieri Riuniti dell'Adriatico, or CRDA).

Between late 1932 and 1935 Conflenti worked for the Società Aerea Mediterranea (SAM) airline. In 1936 he started working for the Caproni group, where he collaborated with Giovanni Pegna; among his last designs were the Caproni Ca.164, Ca.165 and Ca.603.

Conflenti died in Cosenza on 16 July 1946.
