= CAMS 53 =

French flying boat

53
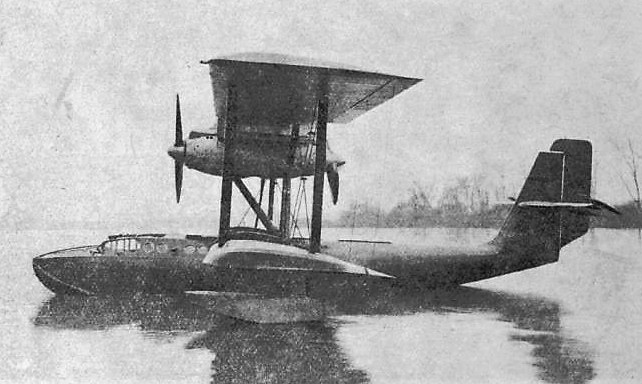

General information
- Type: Transport flying boat
- Manufacturer: CAMS
- Designer: Maurice Hurel
- Primary users: Aéropostale Air Orient, Air Union
- Number built: c. 30

History
- First flight: 1928

The CAMS 53 was a transport flying boat built in France in the late 1920s. Building on the experience gained from the unsuccessful CAMS 51, Maurice Hurel designed an aircraft of similar size and capacity for Aéropostale. The company bought four aircraft straight away for use on its Marseille–Algiers route, and Air Orient purchased another two. More CAMS 53s were soon ordered by these operators as well as Air Union, and the aircraft were used to link Marseille with Ajaccio and Beirut. When the various French airlines were absorbed into Air France in 1933, some 25 CAMS 53s were still in operation and continued in use until 1935.

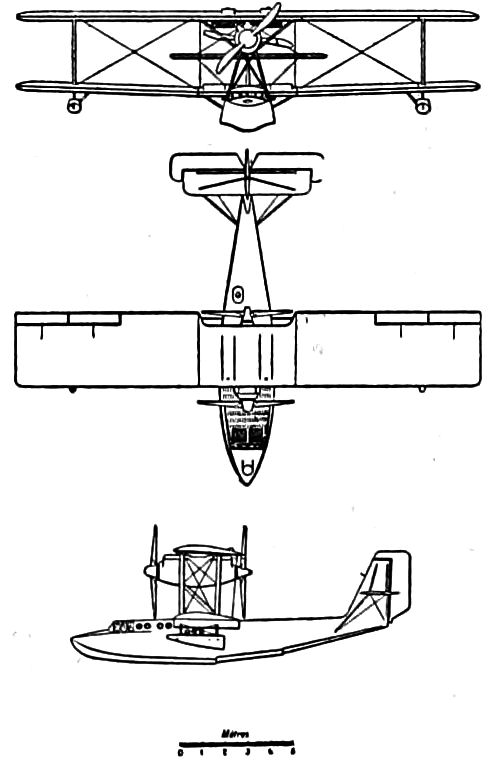
CAMS 53 3-view drawing from Aero Digest September 1928

== Variants ==
- 53 - original production version (seven built)
- 53/1 - strengthened hull and increased fuel capacity (12 built, plus all seven original 53s converted)
- 53/2 - modified hull shape (six built, one converted from 53 via 53-1)
- 53/3 - (redesignated to 56) - version with Gnome et Rhône 9A (licence-built Bristol Jupiter) engines (four built)
- 53/4
- 53/5
- 53R - (originally designated 57) - version with Renault 12Jb liquid-cooled engines (one built)

== Operators ==
France

- Aéropostale
- Air France
- Air Orient
- Air Union

== Specifications (53/1) ==
Data from Les hydravion C.A.M.S. 51, 53, 56 & 58

General characteristics

- Crew: two
- Capacity: four passengers
- Length: 14.82 m (48 ft 7 in)
- Wingspan: 20.40 m (66 ft 11 in)
- Height: 5.52 m (18 ft 1 in)
- Wing area: 113.6 m^{2} (1,223 sq ft)
- Empty weight: 4,700 kg (10,362 lb)
- Gross weight: 6,900 kg (15,212 lb)
- Fuel capacity: 1,800 L (480 US gal; 400 imp gal)
- Powerplant: 2 × Hispano-Suiza 12Lbrx liquid-cooled V-12 engine, 430 kW (580 hp) each

Performance

- Maximum speed: 212 km/h (132 mph, 114 kn)
- Cruise speed: 170 km/h (110 mph, 92 kn)
- Range: 1,000 km (620 mi, 540 nmi)
- Service ceiling: 4,500 m (14,800 ft)
- Time to altitude: 12 min to 2,200 m (7,200 ft)
