= CAMS 55 =

Flying boat built in France

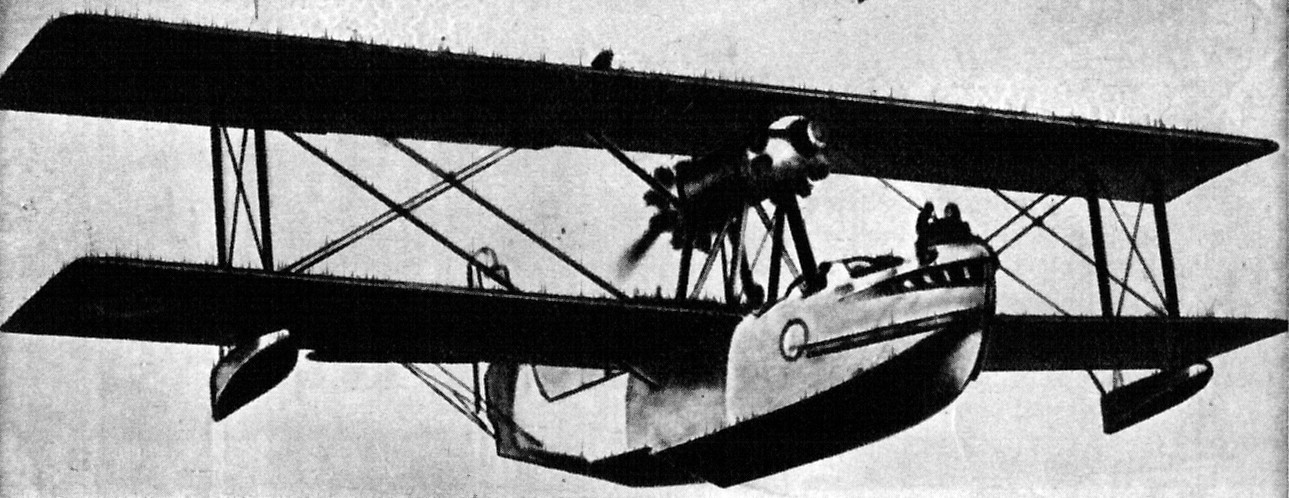

General information
- Type: Reconnaissance flying boat
- Manufacturer: CAMS
- Designer: Maurice Hurel
- Primary user: French Navy
- Number built: 112

History
- First flight: 1928

The CAMS 55 was a reconnaissance flying boat built in France in the late 1920s which equipped the French Navy throughout the 1930s.

== Design and development ==
The CAMS 55 design was derived from the unsuccessful CAMS 51 and followed the familiar Chantiers Aéro-Maritimes de la Seine (CAMS) formula of a conventional biplane flying boat configuration with tandem tractor-pusher engines mounted in the interplane gap. The cockpit was open, and there were open gun positions in the bow and amidships. The bow also incorporated an observation balcony with windows sloped to afford a good downward view.

== Operational history ==
A single prototype was followed by two aircraft to compare different engine installations, one with air-cooled radials and the other a liquid-cooled V engine; in the end, the French Navy ordered some of each. Eventually, 15 escadrilles were equipped with CAMS 55s of various subtypes, replacing the Latham 47 in some units, and in turn being relegated to secondary duties when the Breguet Bizerte became available in 1936. Twenty-nine remained in service at the outbreak of World War II, with the last examples serving with Escadrille 20S in Tahiti until January 1941.

== Variants ==
- 55.001 - prototype with Hispano-Suiza 12Lbr engines (one built).
- 55J - engine test version with Gnome et Rhône licence-built Bristol Jupiter engines (two built).
- 55H - engine test version with Hispano-Suiza 12Lbr engines (two built).
- 55/1 - production version with Hispano-Suiza 12Lbr engines (43 built).
- 55/2 - production version with Gnome et Rhône licence-built Bristol Jupiter engines (29 built).
- 55/3 - version with all-metal hull for French Navy requirement for long-range flying boat. Prototype destroyed early in test programme (one built).
- 55/6 - version with all-metal hull and floats, saving 400 kg (882 lb) of structural weight; deemed too expensive to produce (one built).
- 55/10 - version with geared Gnome et Rhône Jupiter engines and increased fuel tankage (32 built, including four tropicalised machines).
- 55/11 - long-range patrol version (one built).
- 55/14 - version with all-metal hull (one built).

== Operators ==
France

- French Navy

== Specifications (55/10) ==
Data from Aviafrance: CAMS 55/10

General characteristics

- Crew: 4
- Length: 15.03 m (49 ft 4 in)
- Wingspan: 20.4 m (66 ft 11 in)
- Height: 5.41 m (17 ft 9 in)
- Wing area: 113.45 m^{2} (1,221.2 sq ft)
- Empty weight: 4,590 kg (10,119 lb)
- Gross weight: 6,900 kg (15,212 lb)
- Powerplant: 2 × Gnome et Rhône 9Kbr (-cylinder air-cooled radial piston engine, 370 kW (500 hp) each
- Propellers: 4-bladed fixed pitch propellers

Performance

- Maximum speed: 195 km/h (121 mph, 105 kn)
- Cruise speed: 150 km/h (93 mph, 81 kn)
- Range: 1,280 km (800 mi, 690 nmi)
- Service ceiling: 3,400 m (11,200 ft)
- Rate of climb: 2.2 m/s (430 ft/min)

Armament

- 2 × trainable 7.5 mm (0.295 in) machine-guns in open bow position
- 2 × trainable 7.5 mm (0.295 in) machine-guns in open dorsal position
- 2 × 75 kg (165 lb) bombs carried under lower wing

== See also ==
Related lists

- List of Interwar military aircraft
- List of aircraft of World War II

== Bibliography ==
- Bousquet, Gérard (2013). French Flying Boats of WW II. Sandomierz, Poland: Stratus. ISBN 978-83-63678-06-7.
- Morareau, Lucien (December 1998). "L'escadrille du bout du monde" [Squadron at the End of the World]. Avions: Toute l'aéronautique et son histoire (in French) (69): 42–51. ISSN 1243-8650.
- Morareau, Lucien (January 1999). "Des CAMS sur le Pacifique: L'escadrille du bout du monde (fin)" [The CAMS over the Pacific: Squadron at the End of the World]. Avions: Toute l'aéronautique et son histoire (in French) (70): 45–53. ISSN 1243-8650.
