= CAMS 51 =

1920s French flying boat

51
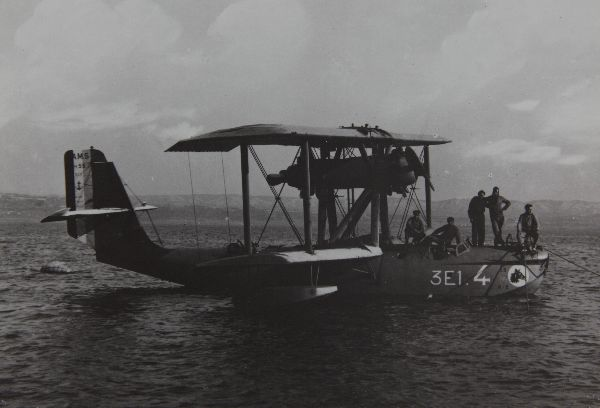

General information
- Type: Transport and patrol flying boat
- Manufacturer: CAMS
- Designer: Maurice Hurel
- Number built: 3

History
- First flight: 1926

The CAMS 51 was a transport flying boat built in France in the mid-1920s. Designed as a private venture by Chantiers Aéro-Maritimes de la Seine (CAMS), it was a conventional biplane with two radial engines mounted in a tractor-pusher installation in the interplane gap. One example (the 51C) was sold to Aéropostale, which used it for tests in preparation for transatlantic services. CAMS also built a militarised version as the 51R3 in the hopes of interesting the French Navy in it as a reconnaissance aircraft, but no order was forthcoming. A final aircraft was built as a record-breaking machine originally designated 51-3 R that broke the world payload-to-altitude record on 18 August 1927 by lifting 2,000 kg to 4,684 m (15,368 ft). This aircraft was later used as a pathfinder for French airmail routes to South America.

== Operators ==
France

- Aéropostale

== Specifications (51C) ==
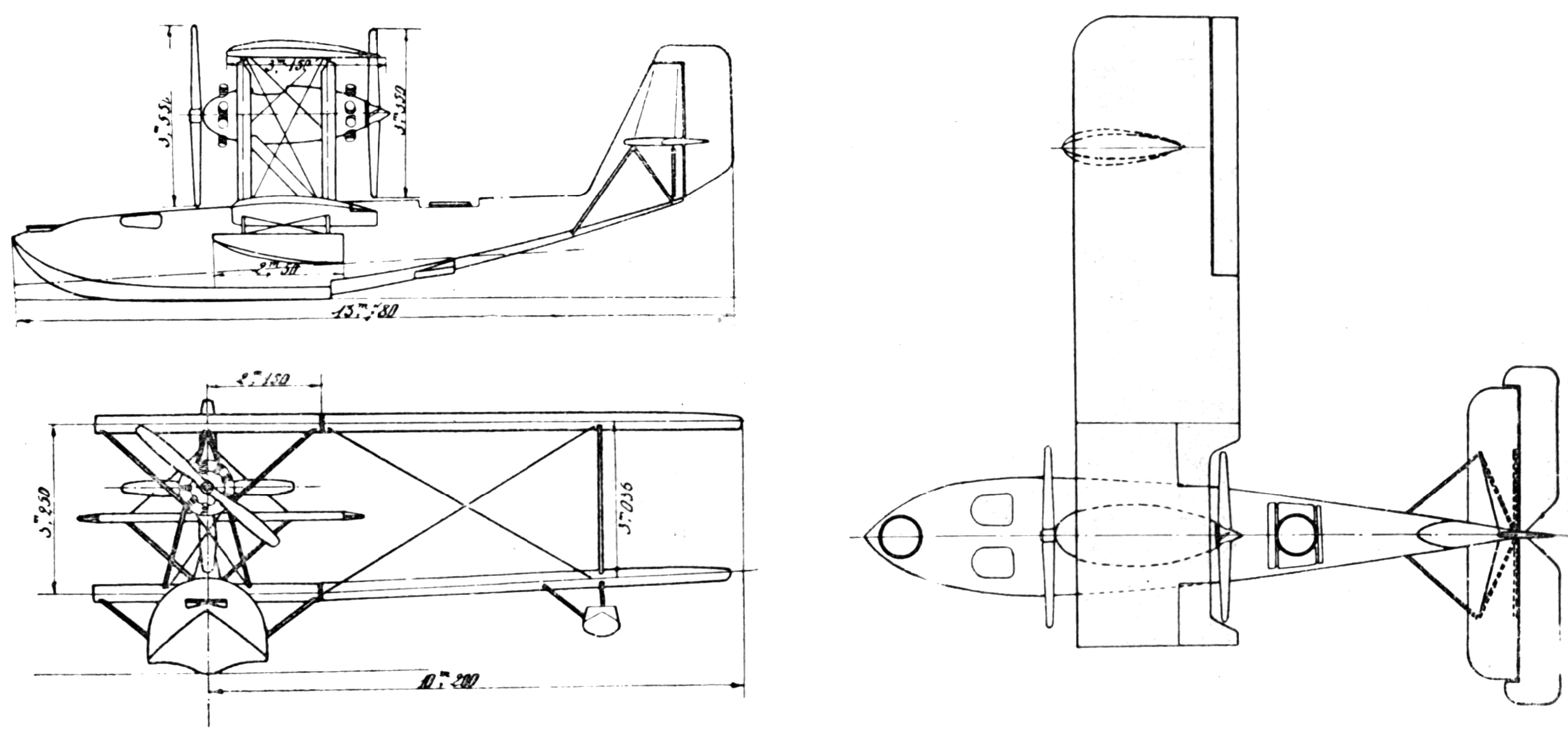
CAMS 51 R.3 3-view drawing from L'Air May 15,1928

General characteristics

- Crew: two
- Capacity: four passengers
- Length: 13.78 m (45 ft 2 in)
- Wingspan: 20.40 m (66 ft 11 in)
- Height: 5.00 m (16 ft 5 in)
- Wing area: 115.0 m^{2} (1,237 sq ft)
- Empty weight: 3,150 kg (6,945 lb)
- Gross weight: 5,150 kg (11,354 lb)
- Powerplant: 2 × Gnome et Rhône 9Aa (licence-built Bristol Jupiter) , 283 kW (380 hp) each

Performance

- Maximum speed: 200 km/h (125 mph, 109 kn)
- Range: 100 km (620 mi, 540 nmi)
- Service ceiling: 4,600 m (15,100 ft)
