= Claude Grahame-White =

19/20th-century English aviator

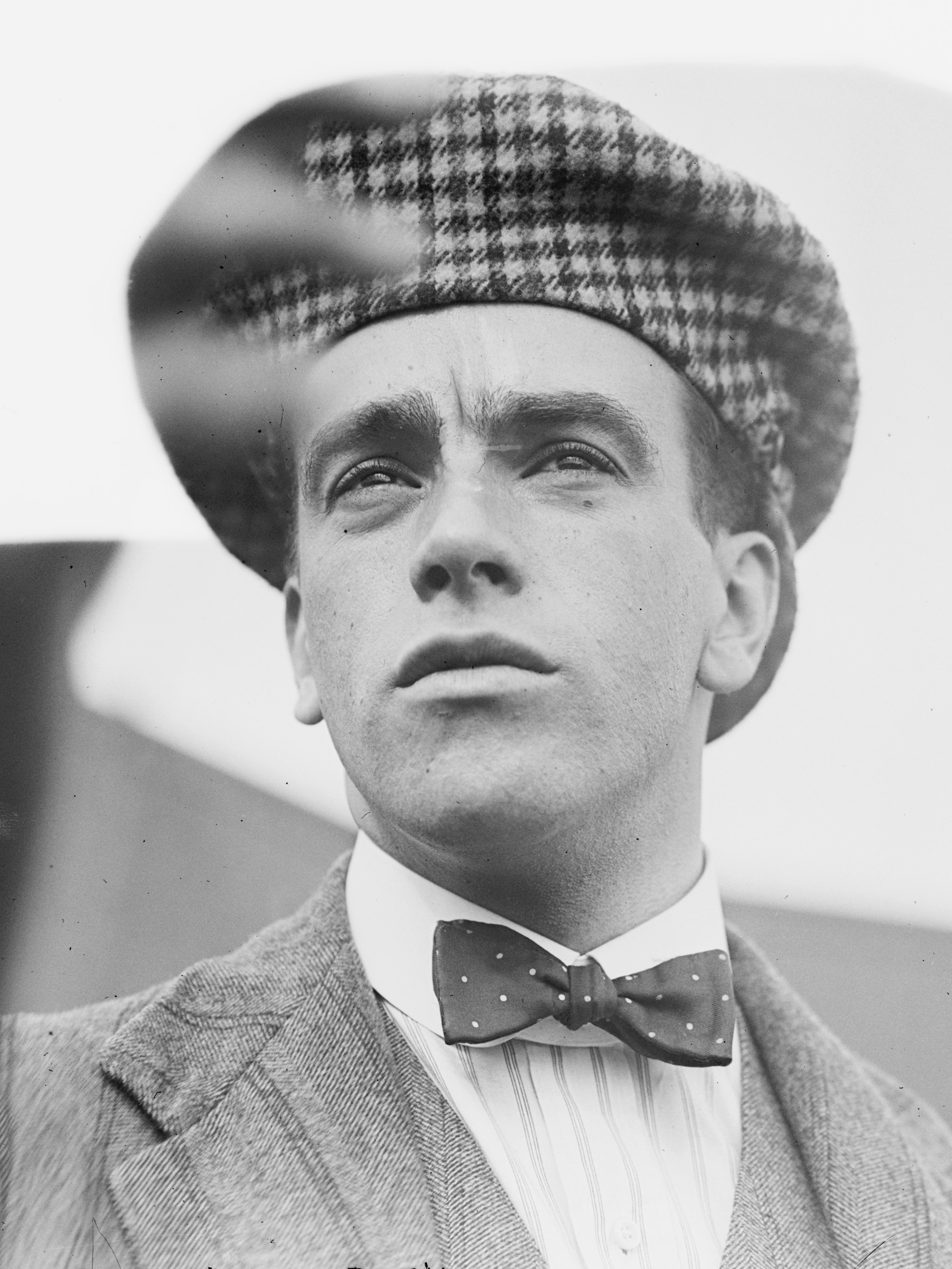
- Grahame-White in 1910
- Born: Claude Grahame-White; 21 August 1879; Bursledon, Hampshire, England
- Died: 19 August 1959 (aged 79); Nice, France
- Spouse(s): Dorothy Caldwell Taylor (m. 1912; div. 1916) Ethel Levey (m. 1916; div. 1939) Phoebe Lee (m. 1939)

Claude Grahame-White (21 August 1879 – 19 August 1959) was an English pioneer of aviation, and the first to make a night flight, during the Daily Mail-sponsored 1910 London to Manchester air race.

== Early life ==
Claude Grahame-White was born in Bursledon, Hampshire in England on 21 August 1879, and educated at Bedford School. He learned to drive in 1895, was apprenticed as an engineer and later started his own motor engineering company.

== Aviation career ==
Grahame-White's interest in aviation was sparked by Louis Blériot's crossing of the English Channel in 1909. This prompted him to go to France, where he attended the Reims aviation meeting, at which he met Blériot and subsequently enrolled at his flying school.

Grahame-White was one of the first people to qualify as pilot in England, becoming the holder of Royal Aero Club certificate No. 6, awarded in April 1910. He became a celebrity in England in April 1910 when he competed with the French pilot Louis Paulhan for the £10,000 prize offered by the Daily Mail newspaper for the first flight between London and Manchester in under 24 hours. Although Paulhan won the prize, Grahame White's achievement was widely praised.

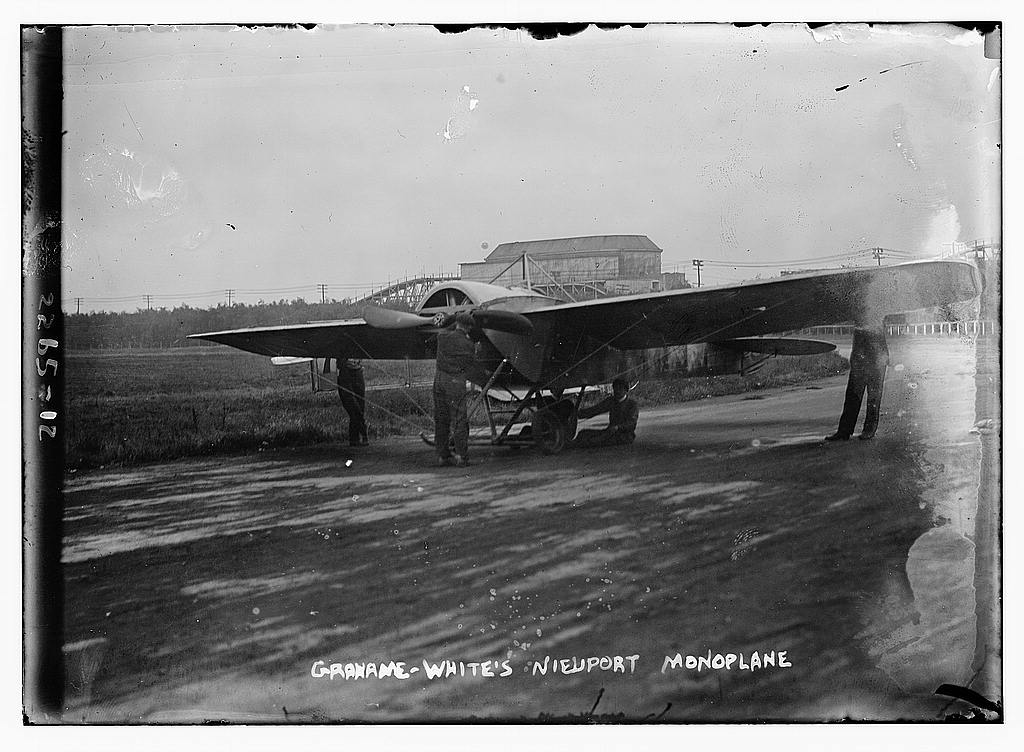
White's Nieuport IV circa 1912

On 2 July 1910, Grahame-White, in his Farman III biplane, won the £1,000 first prize for Aggregate Duration in Flight (1 hr 23 min 20 secs) at the Midlands Aviation Meeting at Wolverhampton. In the same year he won the Gordon Bennett Trophy race in Belmont Park, Long Island, New York, for which he was awarded the Gold Medal of the Royal Aero Club.

On 14 October 1910, while in Washington, D.C., Grahame-White flew his Farman biplane over the city and landed on West Executive Avenue near the White House. Rather than being arrested Grahame-White was applauded for the feat by the newspapers.

On 26 September 1911 at an International Air Meet at Nassau Boulevard Long Island New York attended by Eugene Ely, George W. Beatty, Harry Atwood, Bud Mars, J. A. D. MucCurdy and Matilda Moissant, Grahame-White won a prize of $600.00 in a speed contest for flying his monoplane ten miles at a speed of 61 1/2 miles per hour.

He is known for activities related to the commercialisation of aviation, and he was also involved in promoting the military application of air power before World War I with a campaign called "Wake Up Britain", also experimenting with fitting various weapons and bombs to aircraft. He appeared in the 1914 film Across the Atlantic (also titled Secret of the Air) with fellow aviator Gustav Hamel; the film was directed by Herbert Brenon and starred King Baggot.

Grahame-White formed the Women's Aerial League in 1909 and trained several women to fly. Members of the league included test pilot Winifred Buller, Lady Anne Savile, Eleanor Trehawke Davies and suffragette leaders Emmeline and Christabel Pankhurst. He established a flying school at Hendon Aerodrome. Cheridah de Beauvoir Stocks, the second British woman to gain a Royal Aero Club aviator's licence, trained at the school, earning her certificate in November 1911. In 1912 Grahame-White gave H. G. Wells his first flight.

During World War I, Grahame-White flew the first night patrol mission against an expected German raid on 5 September 1914. Hendon Aerodrome was lent to the Admiralty (1916), and eventually taken over by the RAF in 1919. It was purchased by the RAF in 1925, after a protracted legal struggle. After this he lost his interest in aviation, eventually moving to Nice in his old age, where he died in 1959 having made a fortune in property development in the UK and US.

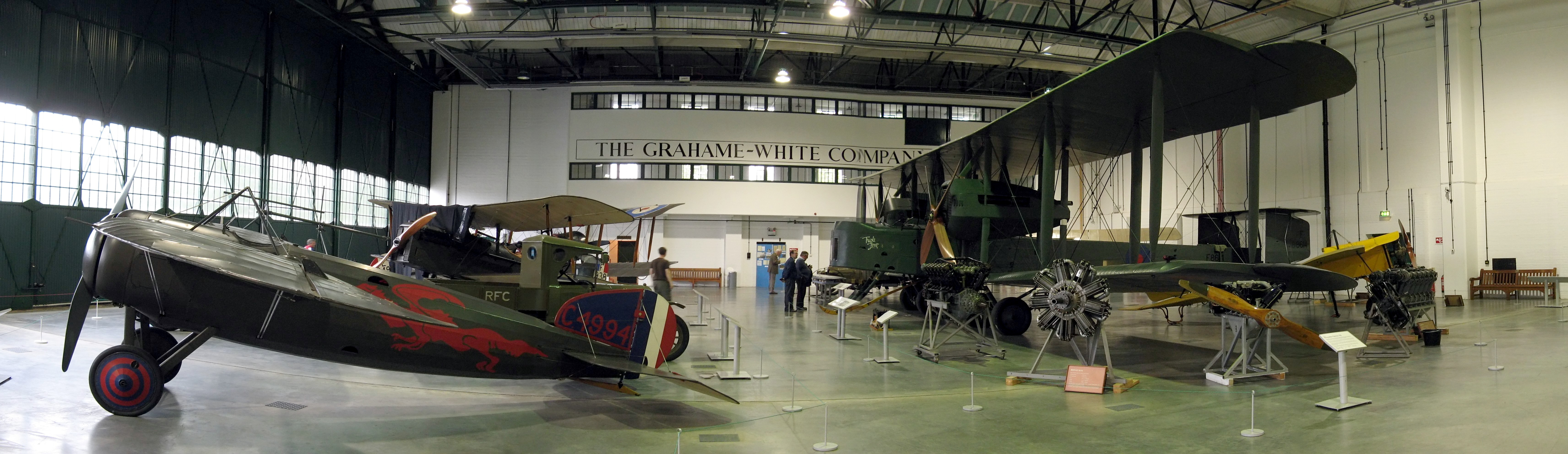
Grahame-White Factory interior, reconstructed at the Royal Air Force Museum London

Hendon Aerodrome later became RAF Hendon but after flying ceased there in the 1960s it was then largely redeveloped as a housing estate which was named Grahame Park in tribute to Grahame-White. An original World War I Grahame-White aircraft factory hangar was relocated a few years ago to the nearby Royal Air Force Museum London, where it houses the museum's World War I collection and is named the Grahame-White Factory.

Grahame-White was a co-founder of Aerofilms Limited in 1919.

== Grahame-White Aviation Company ==
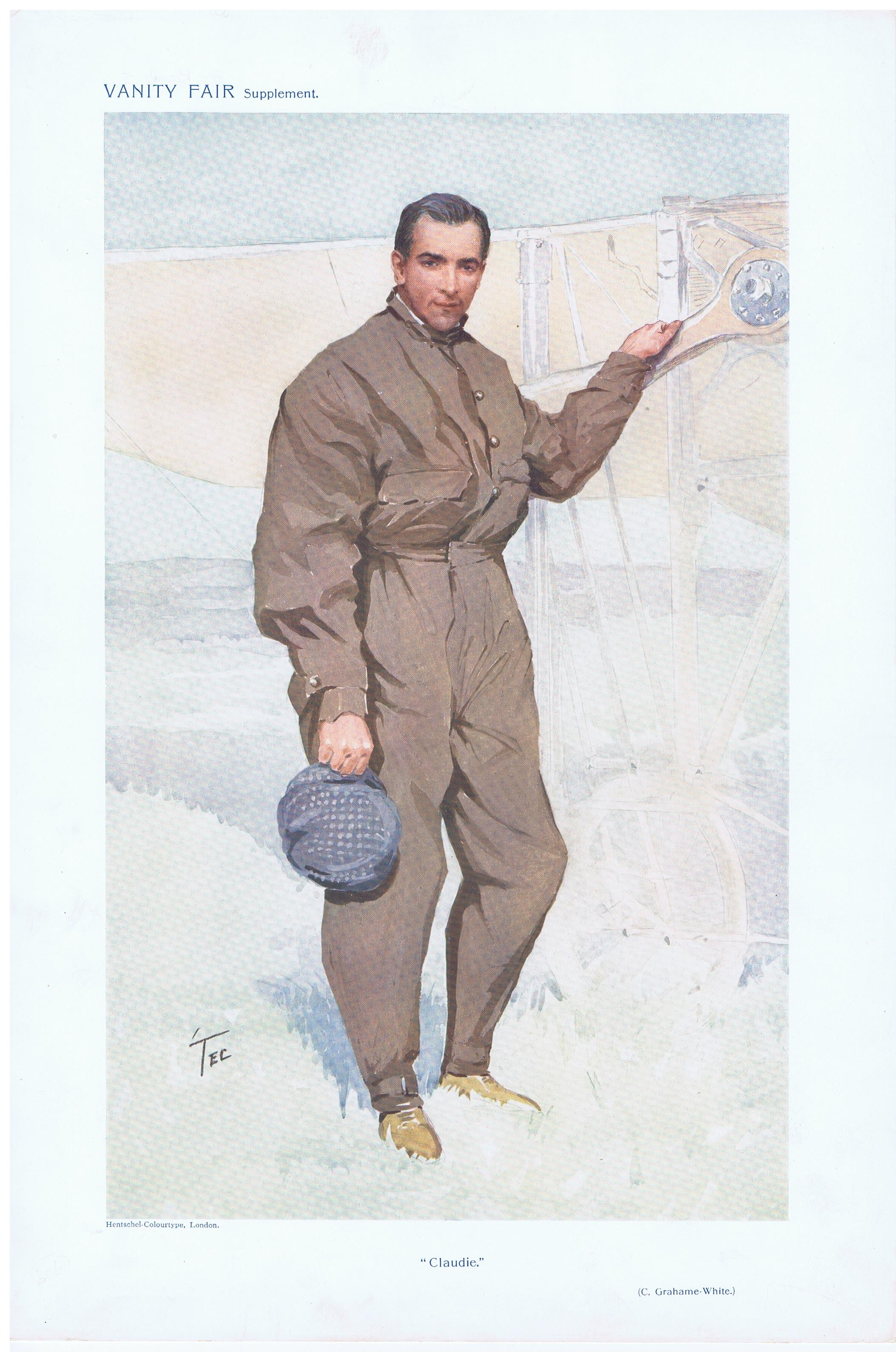
Claudie, Vanity Fair, 1911

In 1911 The Grahame-White Aviation Company was formed to cover his aviation interests, including aerodromes and aircraft design, development, and construction. One of the designers, John Dudley North, became Boulton & Paul's chief designer.

Aircraft built by the Grahame-White Aviation Company included:

- Grahame-White Baby
- Grahame-White Type VI
- Grahame-White Type VII "Popular"
- Grahame-White Type IX Monoplane
- Grahame-White Type X Charabanc
- Grahame-White "Lizzie"
- Grahame-White Type XI
- Grahame-White Type XIII Circuit of Britain biplane/scout
- Grahame-White Type XIV (License-built Morane-Saulnier G)
- Grahame-White Type XV
- Grahame-White Type 18
- Grahame-White G.W.19 (License-built Breguet Bre.5)
- Grahame-White Type 20 Scout (Prototype only)
- Grahame-White Type 21 Scout (Prototype only)
- Grahame-White Sommer-biplane
- Grahame-White G.W.E.IV Ganymede
- Grahame-White G.W.E.VI Bantam
- Grahame-White G.W.E.VII Limousine

== Publications ==
As well as his success in aviation, Claude Grahame-White was a published author whose works include:

- The Story of the Aeroplane
- The Aeroplane, Past, Present, and Future, 1911
- The Aeroplane in War
- Aviation, 1912
- Learning to Fly, 1914
- Aircraft in the Great War, 1915
- Air Power, 1917
- Our First Airways, their Organisation, Equipment, and Finance, 1918
- Heroes of the Air
- With the Airmen
- The Air King’s Treasure
- The Invisible War-Plane
- Heroes of the Flying Corps
- Flying, an Epitome and a Forecast, 1930

He also contributed to newspapers, reviews, and magazines, dealing with aeronautics in the military and commercial fields.

== See also ==
- Louis Paulhan
