= Charlie Watkins =

Charlie Watkins may refer to:

- Charlie Watkins (footballer)
- Charlie Watkins (audio engineer)
- Charlie Watkins (comics)

== See also ==
- Charles Watkins (disambiguation)
