= Charles Watkins =

Charles Watkins may refer to:

- Charles Watkins (legal writer) (died 1808), Welsh lawyer
- Charles N. Watkins (1855–1896), principal of Bannock Academy, now Brigham Young University–Idaho
- Charles F. Watkins (1872–1936), American physician, surgeon and physiotherapist
- Charles Frederic Watkins (1794–1873), Anglican clergyman
- Charles Horace Watkins (1884–1976), aviation pioneer
- Charles James Watkins (1846–1906), English entomologist
- Charles L. Watkins (1879–1966), first parliamentarian of the United States Senate
- Charlie Watkins (footballer) (1921–1998), Scottish professional football player and manager
