= Angus-Sanderson =

Angus Sanderson badge of H. H. Linz

The Angus-Sanderson was an English automobile manufactured from 1919 to 1927 by Sir William Angus, Sanderson & Company Ltd.

== History ==
In concept it was something like the Bean and Cubitt; the idea was that one model would be mass-produced, as Ford had done so successfully. The 14 hp (10 kW) car was an assembly of proprietary parts, as it contained a 2.3-litre side-valve engine from Tylor, a 3 speed gearbox and rear axle by Wrigley, Woodhead springs, and Goodyear wheels. One distinctive feature were disc wheels with a wavy pattern. Indeed, the company made fewer of its own parts than any other British car company at the time. Approximately 3000 cars were produced but the car was expensive at £575.

"It came on the market in 1919 and by 1921 the impact of the Morris at undercut prices killed it off, although not before cars had been supplied to the Princess Royal and to S.F. Edge."

The company was refinanced as Angus Sanderson (1921) Ltd and moved production from Birtley, County Durham to the Grahame-White aircraft factory in Hendon, Middlesex in 1921 and toyed with the idea of building a smaller 8 hp car in 1925 but few, if any were built. Neither of these actions nor a price reduction to £365 staved off the inevitable, and the company folded for good in 1927.

== See also ==
- List of car manufacturers of the United Kingdom
