= Grahame-White =

Brand

Grahame-White was an early British aircraft manufacturer, flying school and later manufacturer of cyclecars.

The company was established as Grahame-White Aviation Company by Claude Grahame-White at Hendon in 1911. The firm built mostly aircraft of its own design, including the successful Type XV, but during World War I produced Morane-Saulnier types under licence for the British military. The company ceased aircraft manufacturing operations in 1920.

In the same year the company was renamed Grahame-White Company Ltd. and manufactured cyclecars until 1924 when the company ceased its operations completely.

== Aircraft ==
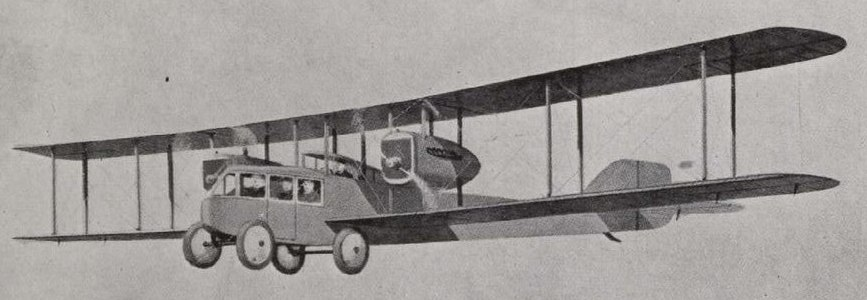
"A Five-seated Touring Aeroplane of the Grahame-White Company." (artist's impression, 1919)

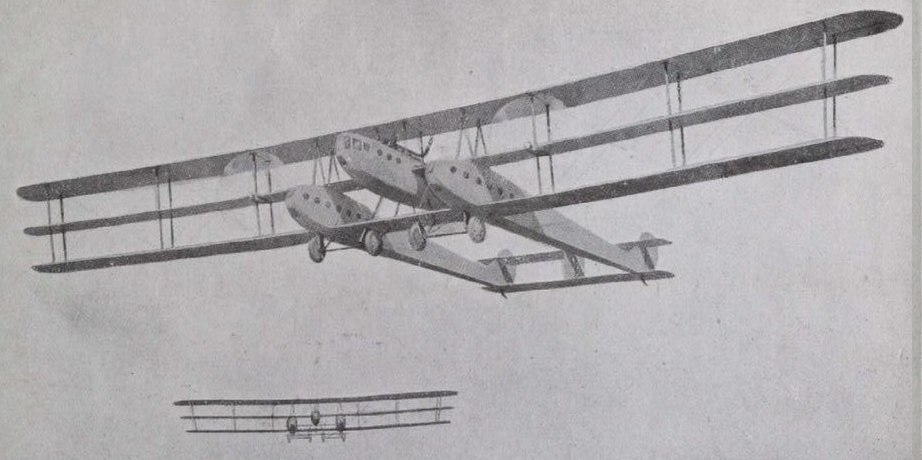
"A Twenty-four Seater Passenger Aeroplane of the Grahame-White Company." (artist's impression, 1919)

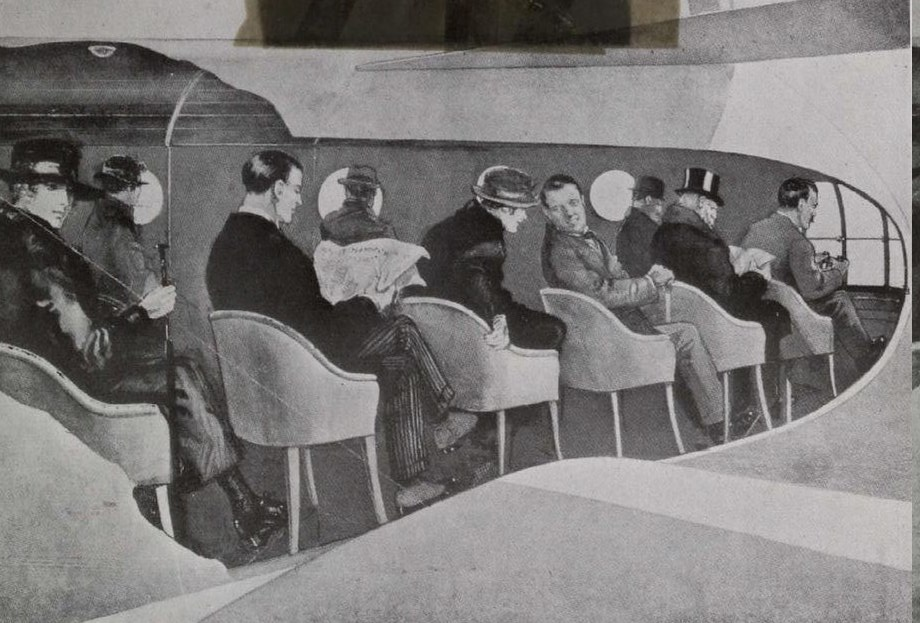
"View of one of the Compartments of the Grahame-White Twenty-four Seater. Each Compartment accommodates Twelve Passengers." (1919)

- Grahame-White Baby
- Grahame-White Type VI
- Grahame-White Type VII Popular
- Grahame-White Type X Charabanc
- Grahame-White Type XI
- Grahame-White Type XIII Circuit of Britain biplane/scout
- Grahame-White Type XV
- Grahame-White Type 18
- Grahame-White G.W.19 (License-built Breguet Bre.5)
- Grahame-White Type 20 Scout (Prototype only)
- Grahame-White Type 21 Scout (Prototype only)
- Grahame-White Ganymede
- Grahame-White G.W.E.7
- Grahame-White Bantam

== Cyclecars ==
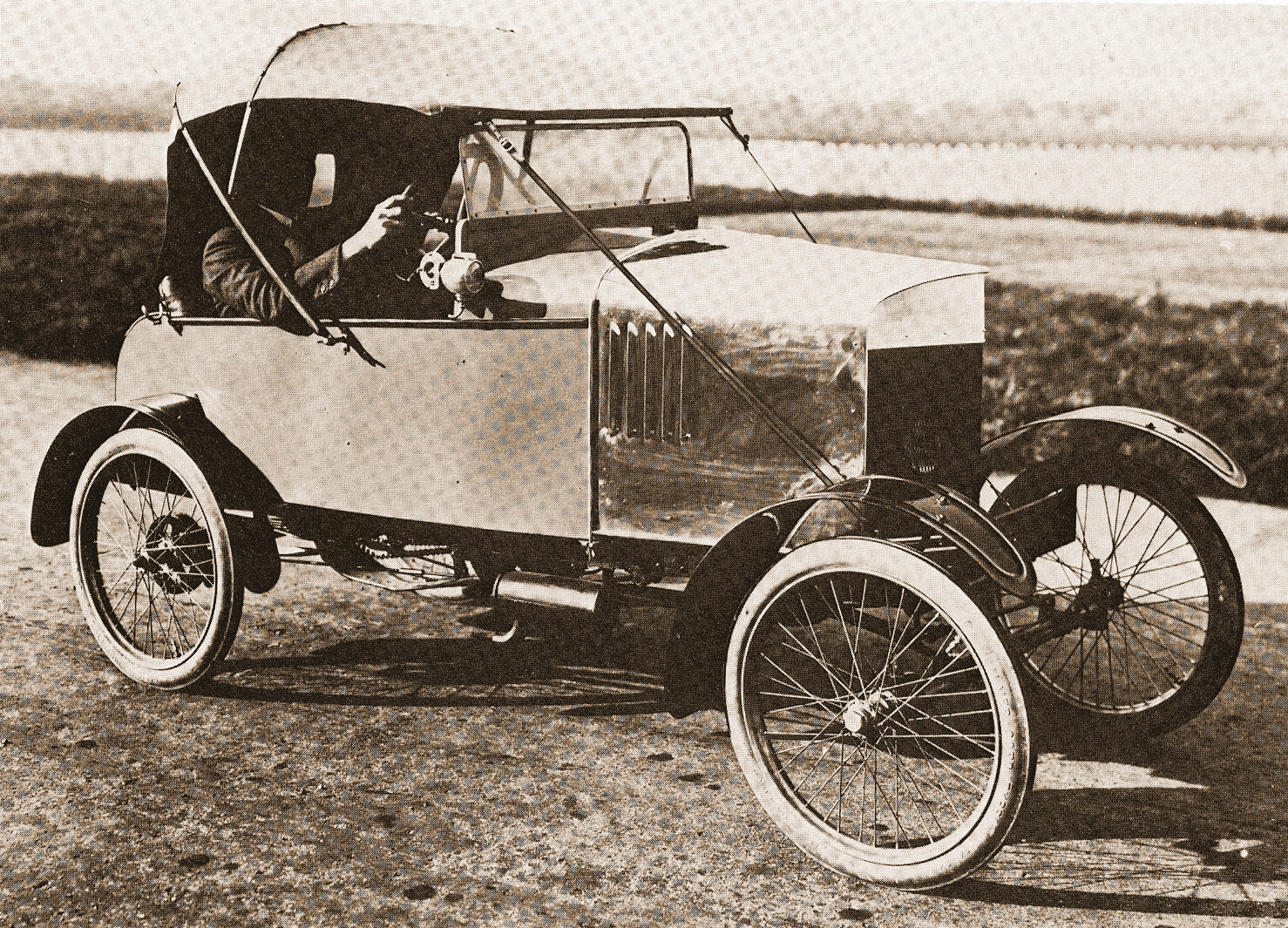
1920 Graham-White car

From 1920 onwards a very basic two-seat 3.3 hp type with air-cooled single-cylinder engine of 348 cc capacity was offered. It had a two-speed transmission with final chain drive. The car had quarter elliptical spring suspension front and rear as well as flex in the wood frame and seat cushions. In 1921 a 7 hp type with a Coventry Victor twin-cylinder engine (capacity: 689 cc) and friction drive was added for one year only followed in 1924 by a four-cylinder 10 hp type with a Dorman engine of 1,094 cc, but very few were made. The final Angus-Sanderson cars were also made in the factory.

Model	Years	No. of Cylinders	Capacity	Wheelbase
3.3 hp	1920–1924	1	348 cc	6' 5"
7 hp	1921	straight-2	689 cc	8' 1"
10 hp	1924	straight-4	1094 cc	8' 1"

== See also ==
- List of car manufacturers of the United Kingdom
