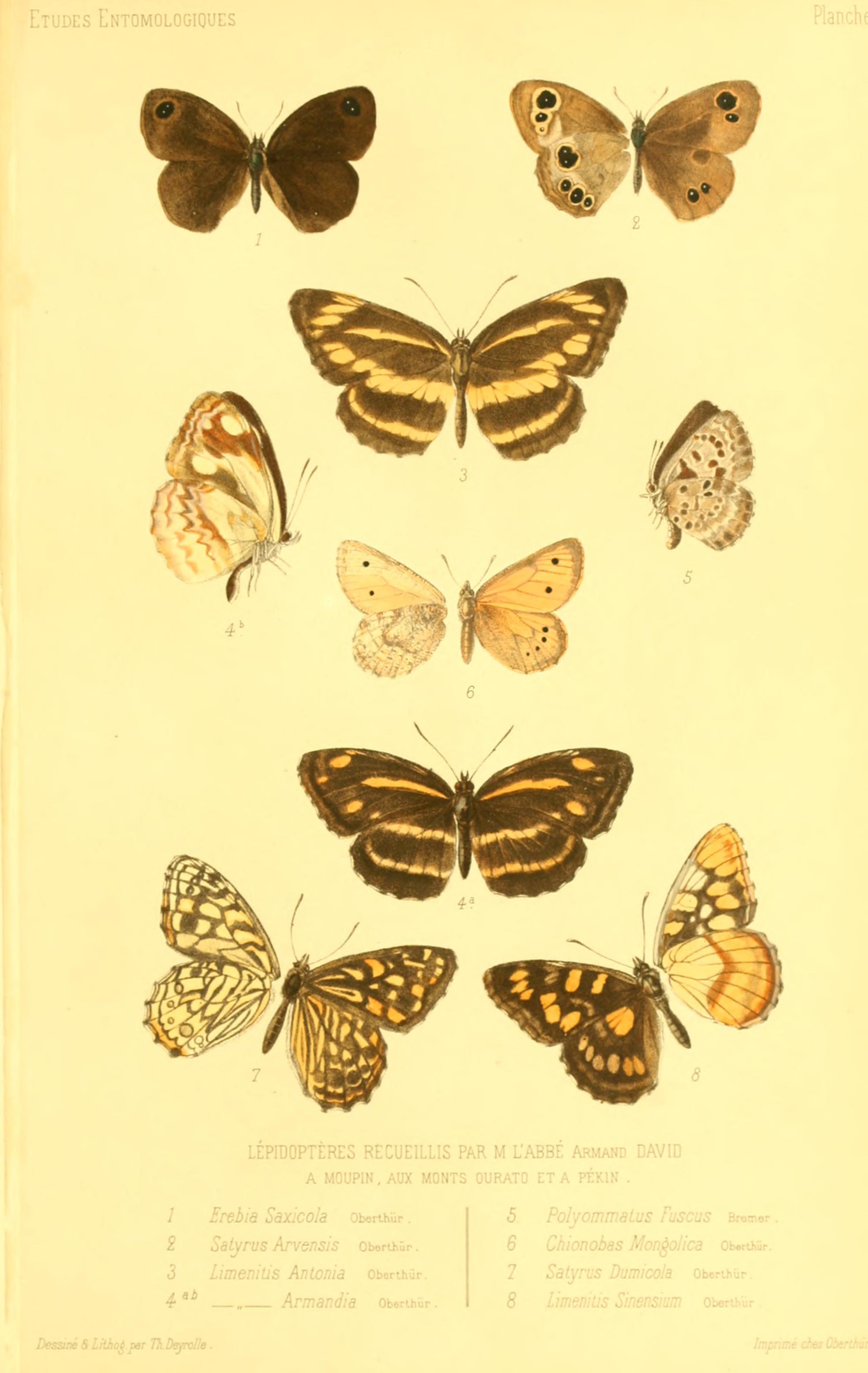
- Loxerebia saxicola in Charles Oberthür's Ètudes d'entomologie: Lépidoptères de Chine

Scientific classification
- Kingdom: Animalia
- Phylum: Arthropoda
- Clade: Pancrustacea
- Class: Insecta
- Order: Lepidoptera
- Family: Nymphalidae
- Tribe: Satyrini
- Genus: Loxerebia; Watkins, 1925

Synonyms
- Hemadara Moore, 1893

= Loxerebia =

Genus of butterflies

Loxerebia is a butterfly genus of the subfamily Satyrinae. The genus is confined to China (including Tibet), Mongolia, Burma, Thailand and Laos. Most species are endemic to China.

== Species ==
- Loxerebia albipuncta (Leech, 1890)
- Loxerebia bocki (Oberthür, 1893)
- Loxerebia carola (Oberthür, 1893)
- Loxerebia chouchuensis (Okano & Okano, 1985)
- Loxerebia delavayi (Oberthür, 1891)
- Loxerebia innupta (South, 1913)
- Loxerebia loczyi (Frivaldsky, 1885)
- Loxerebia martyr Watkins, 1927
- Loxerebia megalops (Alphéraky, 1895)
- Loxerebia narasingha (Moore, 1857)
- Loxerebia phyllis (Leech, 1891)
- Loxerebia pieli Huang & Wu, 2003
- Loxerebia pratorum (Oberthür, 1886)
- Loxerebia ruricola (Leech, 1890)
- Loxerebia rurigena (Leech, 1890)
- Loxerebia saxicola (Oberthür, 1876)
- Loxerebia seitzi (Goltz, 1939)
- Loxerebia sylvicola (Oberthür, 1886)
- Loxerebia yanziya Lang & Hou, 2019
- Loxerebia yphtimoides (Oberthür, 1891) (later sic. "ypthimoides", possibly elsewhere as "yphthimoides")
- Loxerebia yukikoae Sugiyama, 1992
- Loxerebia zhuka Huang, 2021
