= Gustav Hamel =

British aviator (1889–1914)

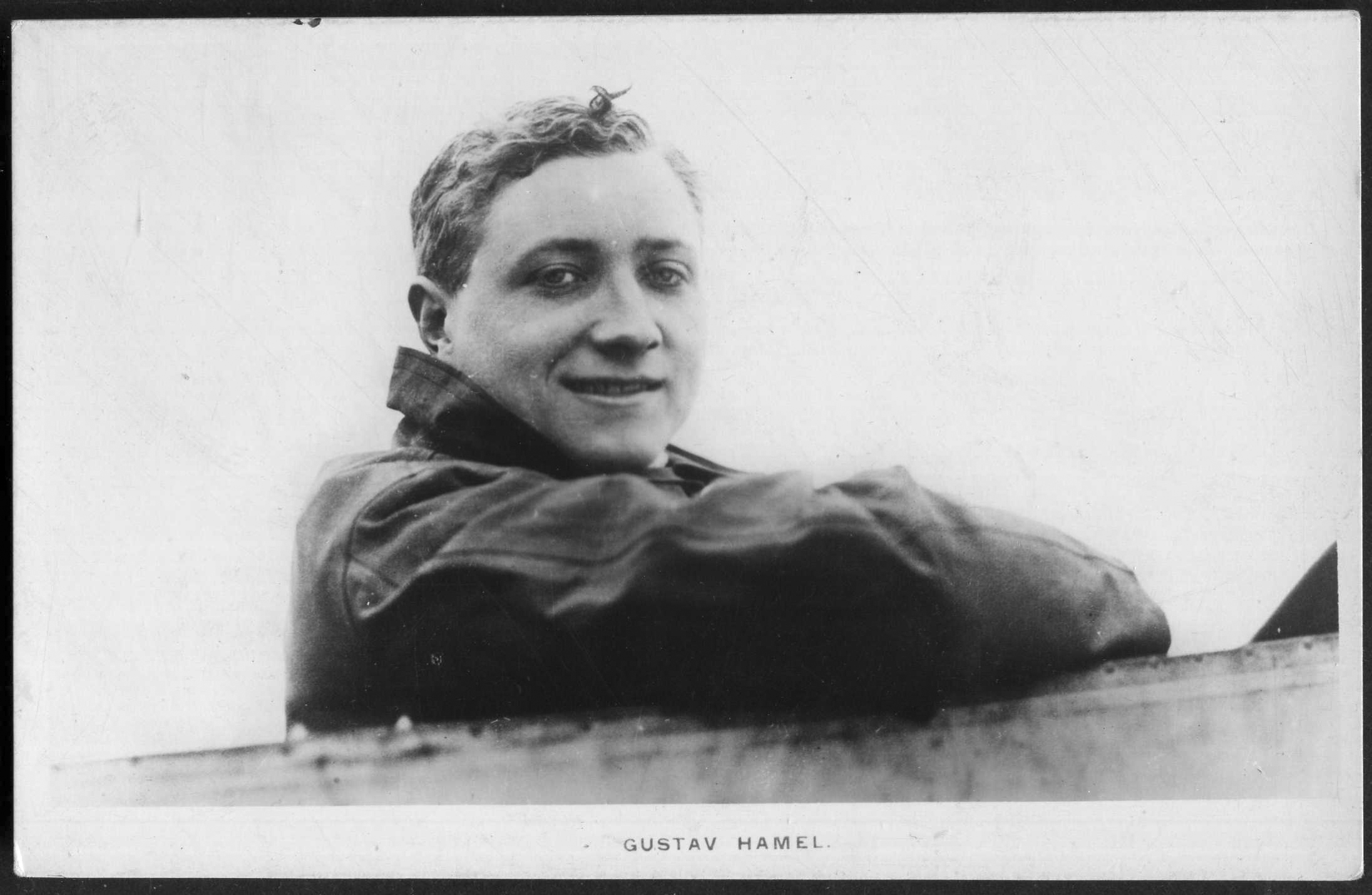
- Postcard of Hamel, winner of the 1913 Aerial Derby at Hendon Aerodrome
- Born: Gustav Wilhelm Hamel; 25 June 1889; Hamburg, Germany
- Disappeared: 23 May 1914 (aged 24)
- Died: c. 1914 (disappeared; aged 24 or 25); English Channel
- Occupations: Aviator; Author
- Known for: Air racing Airmail; Aerobatics; Looping-the-loop; Transatlantic flight

Gustav Wilhelm Hamel (25 June 1889 – missing 23 May 1914) was a pioneer British aviator. He was prominent in the early history of aviation in Britain, and in particular that of Hendon airfield, where Claude Graham-White was energetically developing and promoting flying.

== Early life ==
Gustav Hamel was the only son of Dr Gustav Hugo Hamel (Royal Physician to King Edward VII) and his wife, Caroline Magdalena Elise. He was actually born in Hamburg, Germany, as the eldest child to his parents followed by his sisters Magdalena Augusta Hilda Hamel (21 January 1891) and Dorothea Minna Hamel (February 1893). His youngest sister Anna Elise Bertha Hamel was born in London (6 October 1899). His family moved to England around 1899 to Kingston upon Thames and were naturalised as citizens around 1910. He was educated at Westminster School between 1901 and 1907.

== Aviation career ==
=== 1910–11 ===
He learned to fly at the Blériot school at Pau, France, in 1910. After observing his first flight Louis Blériot commented that he had never seen a pilot with such natural ability. He obtained Aéro-Club de France's certificate no. 358 on 3 February 1911 and the Royal Aero Club's Aviator's certificate no. 64 on 14 February. In March he won first prize in a race from Hendon to Brooklands and back, and on 14 April 1911 he flew from Brooklands to Hendon in a record 17 minutes.

On May 6th, he won a race from Brooklands to Brighton against three other competitors, Howard Pixton, Graham Gilmour and Lt. Richard Talbot Snowden-Smith, covering the distance in 57 minutes in a Bleriot monoplane. Also in May, he was one of the pilots who took part in a demonstration of flying to various members of the government, where he demonstrated the usefulness of aircraft for carrying dispatches by flying a message to Aldershot and returning with a reply. The 64 mi (103 km) round trip took two hours, much of this time due to difficulty in starting his engine for the return journey.

In July 1911 he was one of the British representatives in the competition for the Gordon Bennett Trophy but crashed shortly after takeoff, fortunately without injury. Later that month he competed in the Daily Mail Circuit of Britain race, reaching Thornhill, north of Dumfries, before retiring after a forced landing due to engine problems in which he was slightly injured.

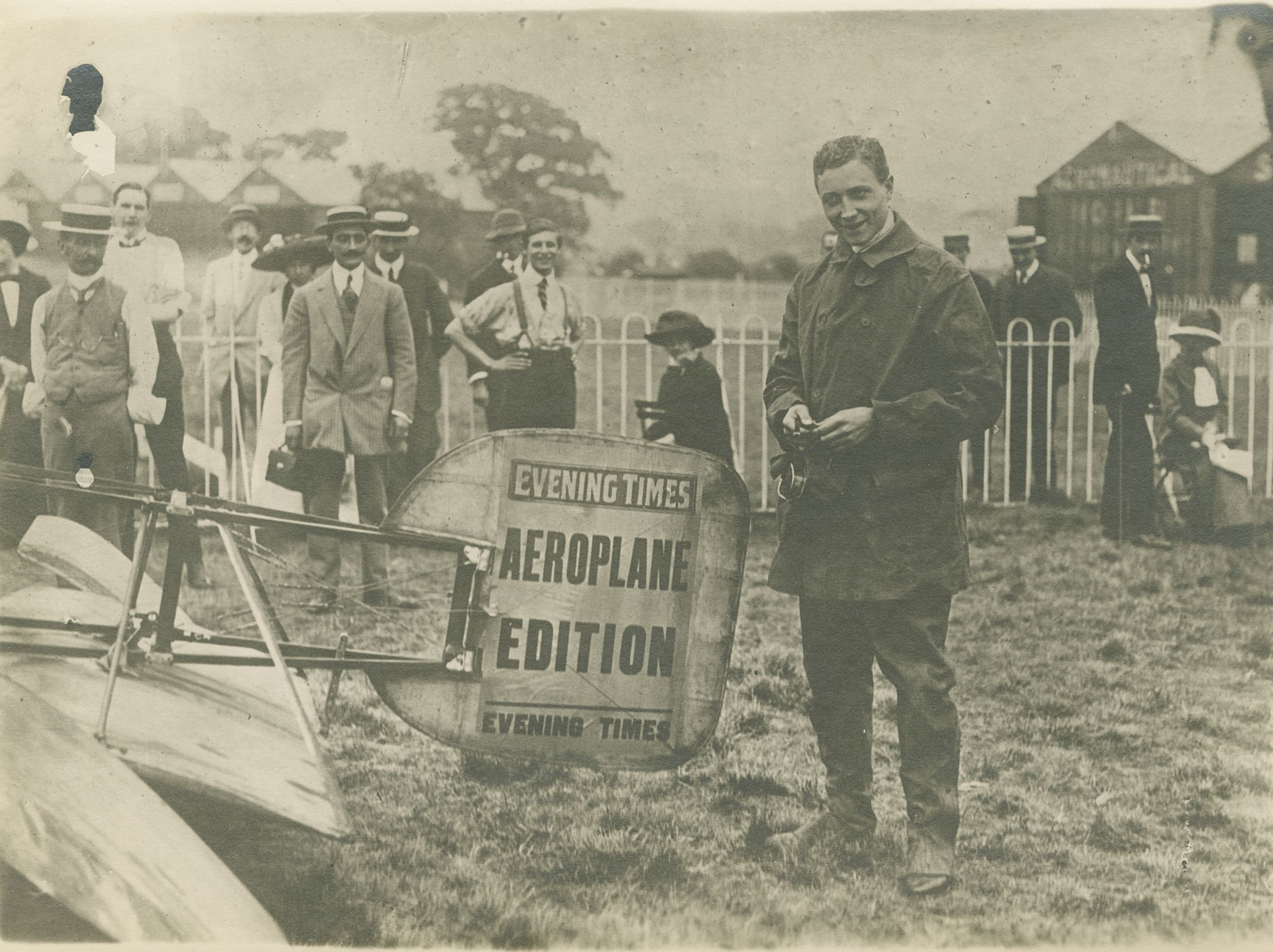
Before the attempted flight from Hendon to Southend

An item in the magazine Flight, of 26 August 1911, covered Hamel's unsuccessful attempt to convey newspapers from Hendon to Southend the previous Saturday. It appears that the publisher sponsored this event as a publicity stunt. However, heavy weather forced his aircraft down at Hammersmith in West London.

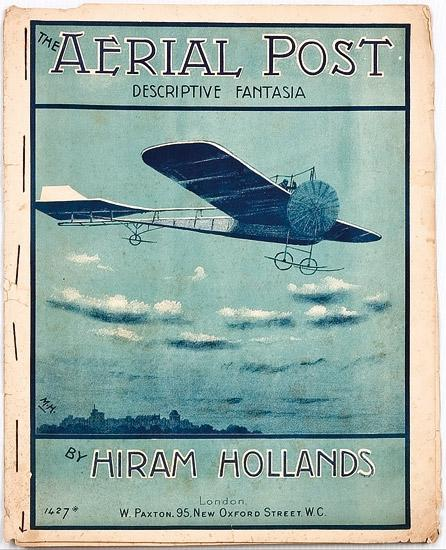
Sheet music cover, c. 1911

On Saturday 9 September 1911 Hamel flew a Blériot XI the 19 miles between Hendon and Windsor in 18 minutes to deliver the first official airmail carried in Great Britain. He carried one bag of mail with 300–400 letters, about 800 postcards and a few newspapers weighing 23 pounds (10 kg) and arrived safely at Windsor around 5.13 pm. Included was a postcard he had written en route.

On 12 October 1911 Hamel made his first cross-channel flight when he ferried a new Bleriot monoplane from Boulogne to Wembley. This was the first of 21 cross channel flight that he was to make.

=== 1912 ===
Hamel made the first cross-channel flight with a woman as passenger on 2 April 1912, when he flew Eleanor Trehawke Davies from Hendon to Paris, with intermediate stops at Ambleteuse and Hardelot. Later in the month he assisted Harriet Quimby to become the first woman pilot to cross the channel by testing her newly delivered Blériot monoplane before her flight.

Hamel made the first flight from Hedon airfield near Hull on Friday 2 August 1912.

Hamel took part in the first Aerial Derby race, carrying Eleanor Trehawke Davies as a passenger. At first he was credited with the fastest time, since Thomas Sopwith was disqualified for missing one of the control points, but after Sopwith successfully appealed Hamel was relegated to second place.

=== 1913 ===
In April 1913 Hamel made the first cross-channel return flight carrying a passenger, the Evening Standard journalist Frank Dupree. and later that month flew with Dupree as passenger from Dover to Cologne, the first time that a flight had been made from England to Germany. The flight, sponsored by the Evening Standard, was intended to draw attention to Britain's need for military aircraft.

In August 1913 a seventy five mile air race around the Midlands was arranged between Bentfield Hucks and Hamel. The take-off point for the contest was the Tally-Ho grounds, adjacent to Cannon Hill Park. Both aviators then flew anti-clockwise around the circuit, landing at Redditch recreation ground, Coventry, Nuneaton, Tamworth and Walsall and finishing at Edgbaston. Hamel won the race by a margin of just twenty seconds.

Following his disappointment the previous year Hamel entered the 1913 Aerial Derby, flying a Morane-Saulnier monoplane. This time he won the competition, completing the course in 1h 15m 49s at a speed of 76 mph (122 km/h) despite a fuel leak which resulted in him having to fly part of the course plugging the leak with his finger.

Hamel was quite active in Worcestershire, visiting Pershore racecourse in October 1913 where he gave exhibitions of flying. He also visited Upton-on-Severn, Worcester Racecourse and Kidderminster cricket ground in October 1913.

=== 1914 ===
Late in 1913, looping the loop was perfected and became a popular event during public flying displays. On 2 January 1914, Hamel took Eleanor Trehawke Davies aloft to experience a loop, and she thus became the first woman in the world to do so. On 2 February he gave an exhibition of looping to the royal family at Windsor, making 14 loops before landing on the East Lawn of Windsor Castle. After lunch with the Royal family he gave a second exhibition before returning to Hendon.

In March 1914 Hamel flew to Cardiff to give a public flying display. While there he met Charles Horace Watkins, who was an engineer perfecting his own aircraft called the Robin Gôch, or Red Robin. Contemporary newspaper reports indicate that a few minutes after they met, Hamel flew them both to Watkins' hangar, where they inspected the Robin Gôch.

In May Hamel announced that he intended to attempt to win the £10,000 prize awarded by the Daily Mail for a flight across the Atlantic ocean, flying a specially built Martin-Handasyde monoplane.

== Personal life ==
Hamel's flying exploits made him a well-known public figure. He was a member of The Coterie, a prominent social set of aristocrats and intellectuals. He was considered popular and good-looking, and was a particular favourite of Lady Diana Manners.

On the 30 September 1911, Hamel was driving his car on the Surbiton Road in Kingston upon Thames with one of his sisters as a passenger. The car struck and killed a five-year-old girl called Gladys Storey, who had been playing in the road.

Hamel was a friend of the actress Gladys Cooper; in 1915 she won £1,200 in damages from a newspaper, the London Mail, in a libel action over rumours she had had adulterous affairs with both Hamel and an actor called Dennis Eadie. Another friend of Hamel's was Eleanor Trehawke Davies. Flying as a passenger with him, she became the first woman to fly the English Channel in 1912 and the first woman to loop the loop.

== Disappearance ==
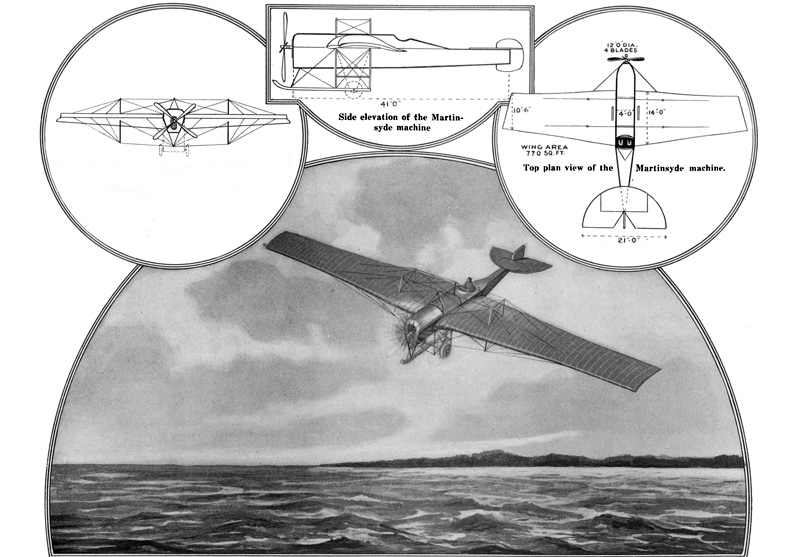
A cutting from Scientific American 11 July 1914, "The eighty-mile-an-hour monoplane the late Gustav Hamel was to have used this summer in an attempt to fly across the Atlantic Ocean from North America to Europe."

On 22 May 1914, Hamel travelled to France to collect a new aircraft, a Morane-Saulnier racing monoplane fitted with a 160 hp Gnome Monosoupape engine. It was his intention on 23 May, to fly from Villacoublay near Paris to Hendon, and then take part in an Aerial Derby that was to be held there later the same day. He had considerable experience of flying across the English Channel, having flown across it around 20 times.

Hamel took off in good weather at 4:40am and reached Le Crotoy at 5:22am, where he landed and had breakfast. He flew on, landing at Neufchâtel-Hardelot near Boulogne, at 9:00am. He then slept for two hours, refuelled his aircraft and had lunch, and took off for the last time at 12:15pm. A presumed last sighting of him was an aircraft seen flying high over the town of Boulogne at 12:30pm.

After Hamal failed to arrive, a large-scale search was begun that evening by the Royal Navy using the cruiser HMS Pathfinder and the destroyers Mallard, Bat, Star and Osprey. Two seaplanes were also deployed in the search but both were destroyed by adverse weather conditions; both pilots were rescued. The search found nothing and was called-off on the 26th May.

On 1 July, the crew of a French fishing vessel, the St. Hélène, found a body in the English Channel around 10 miles off Cap d'Alprech near Boulogne. They did not retrieve the body, but their description of items of clothing and of finding a road map of southern England on the corpse provided strong circumstantial evidence that the body was Hamel's.

Hamel was declared dead in September 1914, after a court heard evidence from Joseph Le Pretre, the skipper of the fishing vessel, and Alexis Longueet, a mechanic who met Hamel at Neufchâtel-Hardelot. Hamel is remembered on a grave stone in Surbiton Cemetery, along with his father and mother who died in 1922 and 1960 respectively.

== Legacy ==
At this time of high international tension, there was speculation that Hamel might have been the victim of sabotage, but no trace of the aircraft was ever found and the story faded with his memory.

A sculpture bust of him by Lady Kathleen Scott was exhibited in 1914. At least one song featuring Hamel was published as sheet-music in 1913. Alongside aviator Claude Grahame-White, Hamal appeared in the 1914 film Across the Atlantic (also titled Secret of the Air) that was directed by Herbert Brenon and starred King Baggot.

After the start of World War 1, the circumstances of Hamel's disappearance, his German place of birth and popular anti-German sentiment led to rumours that he was still alive and flying in the service of the Luftstreitkräfte, the German air force. Or that he had been spying on behalf of the Germans. The rumours required a public denial to be issued on behalf of his family.

Hamel co-authored Flying; some practical experiences with Charles Cyril Turner, author, journalist and aviator. This was published in March 1914.

In 2011, Hamel was portrayed on a set of Royal Mail postage stamps, that marked the centenary of his first airmail flight.

== See also ==
- List of people who disappeared mysteriously at sea

== Additional links ==
- Daily Mail Circuit of Britain Air Race Film of Hamel and other contestants at Brooklands, 22 July 1911 BritishPathe version, link
- Britania Military Bleriot Film of Hamel and Frank Dupree of the London Standard before the first flight from England to Germany, Dover to Cologne, 17 April 1913
- New York Times, 21 May 1914 Article on Hamel's Atlantic flight with H. L. Forster
- The Fateful Year. England 1914 by Mark Bostridge (2014)
- (in Romanian)

Gustav Hamel in libraries (WorldCat catalog)
