= Eleanor Davies =

Eleanor Davies may refer to:

- Eleanor Davies (poet) (1590–1652), writer and prophet
- Eleanor Trehawke Davies (1880–1915), English aviator
