= West Executive Avenue =

Avenue in Washington, D.C., United States

Coordinates: 38°53′51″N 77°2′16.9″W

West Executive Avenue Northwest
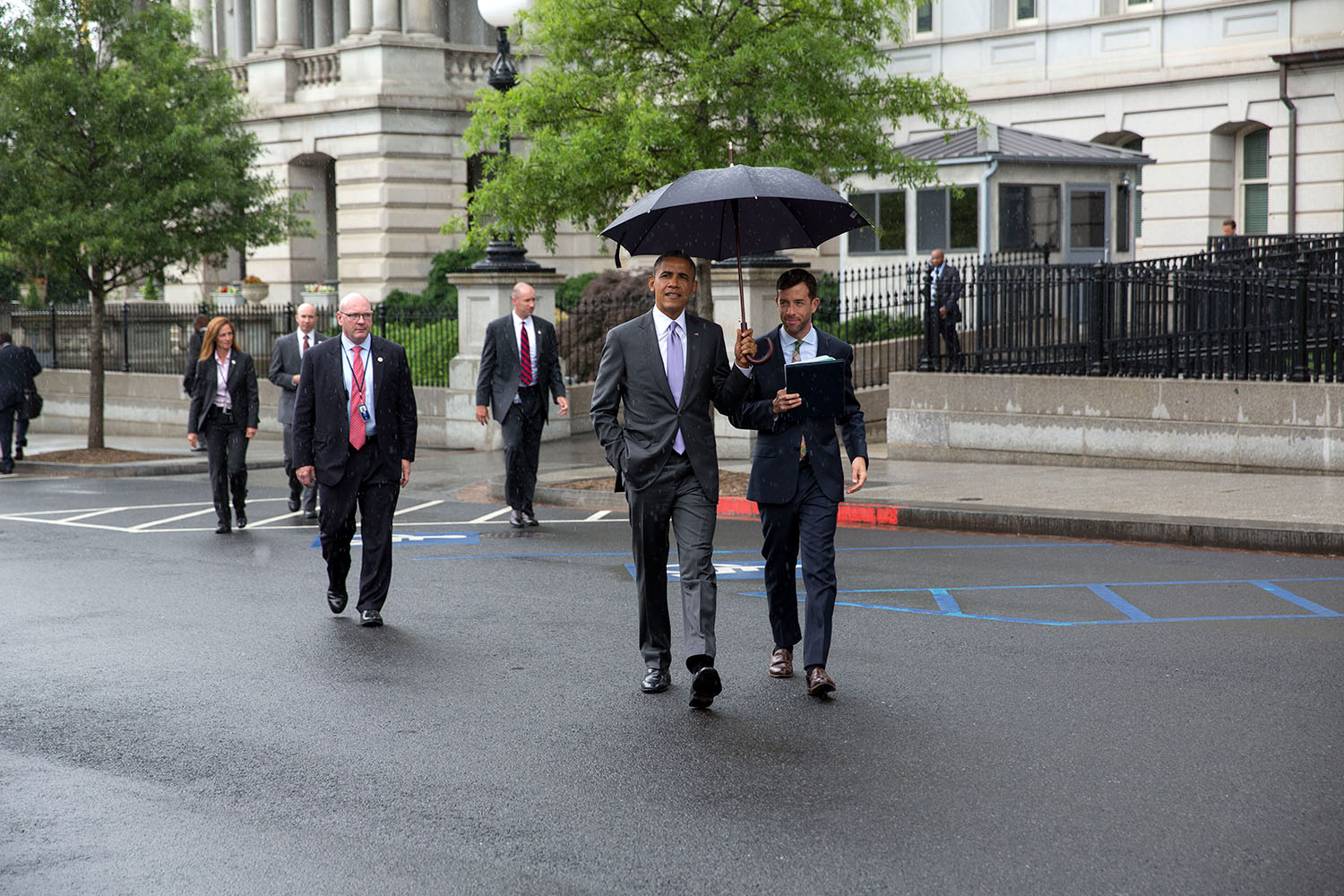
- Barack Obama walks across West Executive Avenue in 2014

- Location within Central Washington, D.C. Location within the District of Columbia Location within the United States
- Owner: United States government
- Length: 1,180 ft (360 m)
- Location: Washington, D.C., United States

Construction
- Completion: 1871

Other
- Designer: Gen. Orville Babcock
- Status: closed, in-use as parking lot

West Executive Avenue Northwest (commonly known as "West Executive Avenue" or "West Exec") is a closed street in Washington, D.C., that, as of 2017, functions as a parking lot for persons employed by the Executive Office of the President. It runs adjacent to the White House.

== Design ==
West Executive Avenue is a short street that runs along a north–south axis adjacent to the White House. It sits between the White House and the Eisenhower Executive Office Building and runs parallel to East Executive Avenue, which, in 1986, was also permanently closed to public traffic. On its northern end it intersects Pennsylvania Avenue, a portion of which was permanently closed to public traffic in 1995.

Claude Grahame-White landing on West Executive Avenue in October 1910

One of several variants of a 1999 plan developed by the National Park Service envisaged the restoration of the historic and aesthetic qualities of the grounds surrounding the White House by converting West Executive Avenue into a pedestrian walkway and moving its parking inventory to a newly built, below-ground structure.

== History ==
West Executive Avenue was constructed in 1871, providing a first-time road link between the north and south sections of President's Park. According to the U.S. Government, in 1910 it was the scene of the first recorded landing, on a public street, of an aircraft when Claude Grahame-White touched down in his Farman biplane to meet United States Secretary of War Jacob M. Dickinson for lunch. During World War II, West Executive Avenue was closed to traffic as a security precaution. In 1951, following the attempted assassination of Harry S. Truman, it was closed permanently as it was believed traffic on the street would pose a safety risk to the President of the United States, and senior staff, walking from the White House to the State, War, and Navy Building (now the Eisenhower Executive Office Building). It was subsequently converted into a parking lot and became "one of the city's most desirable parking lots for Federal workers".

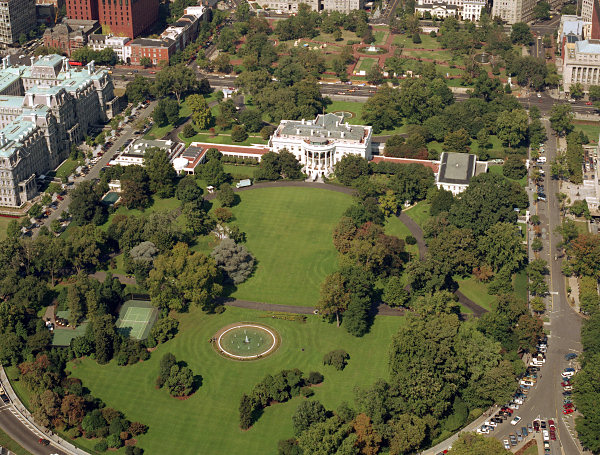
West Executive Avenue, pictured on the left side of this 1984 aerial photograph, sits between the White House and the Eisenhower Building.

In May 2016, Jesse Oliveri of Ashland, Pennsylvania, was shot by an officer of the United States Secret Service Uniformed Division on West Executive Avenue after approaching a checkpoint while brandishing a weapon.

== In popular culture ==
- In the fourth episode of season two of Veep the character Jonah Ryan receives "West Exec parking", sparking jealousy from the characters Dan Egan and Mike McClintock.
- In the tenth episode of season three of Veep, the character Jonah Ryan requests to be assigned "West Exec parking privileges" in exchange for securing a political endorsement from his influential uncle.

== See also ==
- Jackson Place
- Streets and highways of Washington, D.C.
