= East Executive Avenue =

Avenue in Washington, D.C.

East Executive Avenue Northwest (commonly known as "East Executive Avenue") is a closed street in Washington, D.C. that, as of 2017, functions as a service road for authorized vehicles making deliveries to the White House, to which it is adjacent. Constructed in the 1870s, it is a short, north–south road that sits between the White House and the United States Treasury Building. The street was closed to public traffic in 1986 due to security concerns.

== See also ==
- West Executive Avenue
