= Grahame-White Baby =

General information
- Type: trainer
- Manufacturer: Grahame-White
- Designer: Claude Grahame-White
- Number built: ca.6

History
- First flight: 1911

The Grahame-White Baby was an early British aircraft designed by pioneer aviator Claude Grahame-White in 1910.

== Design ==
The Grahame White Baby was a single-seat biplane pusher, of the then orthodox "Farman" layout, with a frontal elevator and a rear-mounted empennage consisting of a biplane horizontal stabilisers with single elevator mounted on the top surface and a single central rudder. As the name suggests, it was considerably smaller than most contemporary aircraft of a similar layout, having a wingspan of only 27 ft (8.2 m). In comparison, the wingspan of a standard Bristol Boxkite was 34 ft 6 in (10.5 m). An unusual feature of the aircraft was the mounting for the 50 hp (37 kW) Gnome rotary engine, which was mounted on a pair of angled beams so that the engine was midway between the upper and lower wings.

The Burgess Company in the United States purchased a licence to build it as the Model E.

== Specifications ==
Data from Lewis 1962, p. 275

General characteristics

- Crew: 1
- Capacity: 1
- Length: 31 ft 9 in (9.68 m)
- Wingspan: 27 ft 1 in (8.25 m)
- Height: 8 ft 6 in (2.59 m)
- Powerplant: 1 × Gnome , 50 hp (37 kW)

Performance

- Maximum speed: 55 mph (89 km/h, 48 kn)
- Endurance: 4 hours

== See also ==
Related development

- Burgess E

Aircraft of comparable role, configuration, and era

- Bristol Boxkite
- Short S 27
