= J. Tylor and Sons =

- Predecessor: Joseph and Henry Tylor
- Founded: 1844
- Defunct: 1921
- Fate: Receivership
- Headquarters: London, UK
- Number of locations: 2 Newgate Street, London; Bele Isles, York Road, London
- Key people: W.H. Tylor, W.H.B. Drayson, P. Bright, J.G. Mair-Rumley
- Products: petrol engines soda bottling machines diving suits sanitary ware water meters

J. Tylor and Sons Limited of London was a company with a background in sanitation that moved into petrol engine manufacture in the 1900s. Its engines were of medium size and found application in buses, lifeboats and First World War military vehicles.

== Company history ==
The original brassfounders business was created by John Tylor (c1755-1818) then operated by Joseph and Henry Tylor as partners in Warwick Lane, London. The partnership was dissolved in 1844. J. Tylor and Sons Limited was then formed operating from the same brass foundry, as engineers making diverse items such as soda water bottling machines, and diving equipment, but later they mainly focussed on plumbing and sanitation, brass valves and fittings, etc. The works in Warwick Lane, Newgate Street, was destroyed by fire in 1891. The company was dissolved and reformed in 1898, and the board of W.H. Tylor, W.H.B. Drayson, Philip Bright) was joined by J.G. Mair Rumley (of James Simpson & Co). The address was 2 Newgate Street, but also added shortly afterwards was Belle Isle, Kings Cross.

The adoption of Tylor engines by the military was financially beneficial to the company, but in the post-war period the company struggled. In 1920 E.G. Wrigley and Company gained control of the company, but they were deeply dependent on the Angus-Sanderson car project, as were J. Tylor and Sons, and when that went into liquidation in January 1921, the failure of J. Tylor and Sons soon followed. In October 1921 it was announced that the directors of Wrigley and Co proposed to write off their investment in both companies. However in the spring of 1922 press adverts announced that a new company had been formed (Angus-Sanderson (1921) Ltd) and the Angus-Sanderson car was back in a new works at Hendon, with the new company now having control of the engine specialist Tylor and Sons. However this resurrection was relatively short-lived and the company folded for good in 1927.

Tylors (Water & Sanitary) Ltd was recorded in 1920. This company changed its name to "Tylors of London Ltd" in 1947. It dropped sanitary products in 1956 and merged with HRI Flowmeters moving to Burgess Hill, Sussex. In 1958 it became a subsidiary of Crane Ltd and ultimately in 1975 part of GEC.

== Sanitation and other products ==
Tylors were involved with a diverse range of water related products, including taps, meters, valves, water closets, but also in other areas such as diving equipment and soda water bottling machines.

One product known is the self-closing tap. Tylors patented the self-closing valve in 1871 Another area where patents were held was in the measurement of fluids using meters Other patents in this area relate to stand-pipes, lavatory overflows, and douche and spray water fittings.

== Tylor engines ==
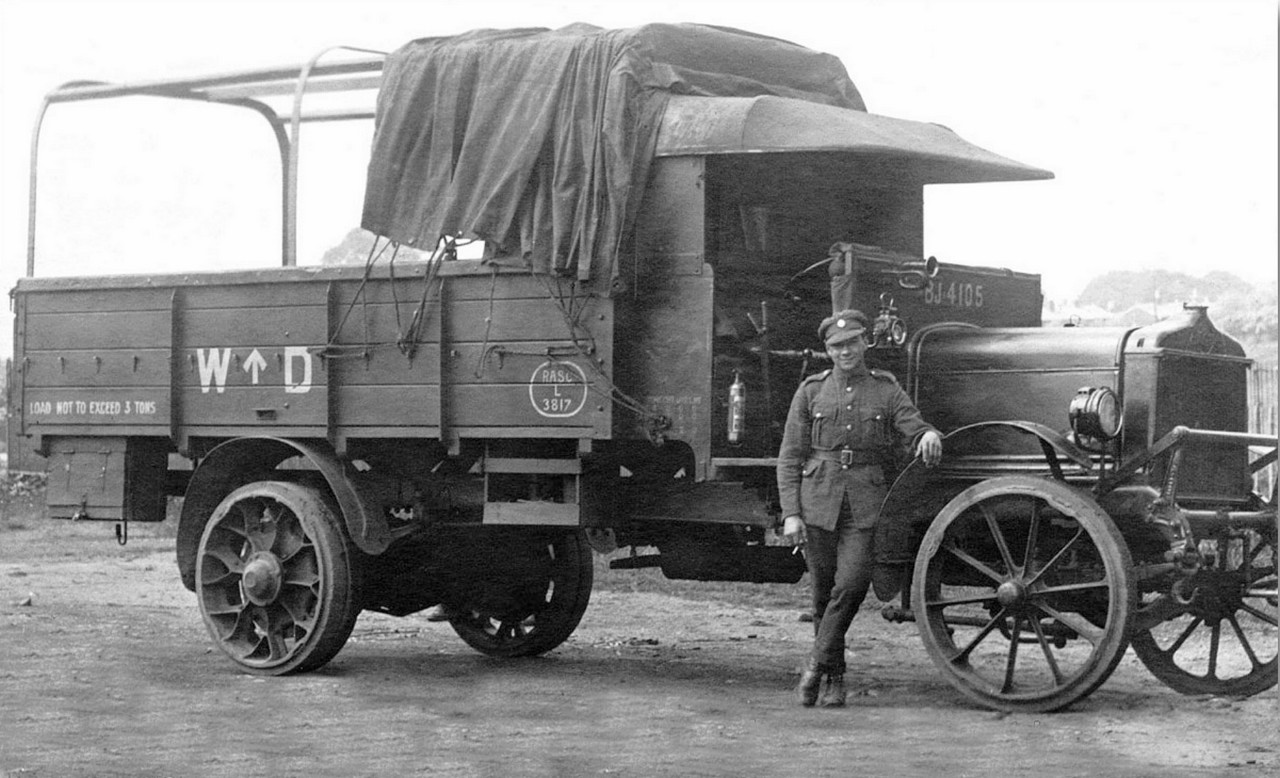
The AEC Y Type WW1 military truck, one of approximately 10,000 - most with the Tylor engine

Tylor engines seem to have been built from around 1905; their engine related patents starting in 1904. A.P. Donnison is named on the patents, an established engineer who later moved to Hopkinson Engineering Co of Huddersfield, and then by 1909 to Boulton & Paul Ltd of Norwich. Tylor exhibited engines at the Olympia Show in 1906. They showed two large petrol engines, suitable for commercial vehicles, and they were reported to be selling these to heavy vehicle manufacturers.

At the First International Commercial Motor Vehicle Show at Olympia in 1907, Dennis Brothers Ltd showed their 40hp chassis fitted with a Tylor engine and 34 seat double deck bus body made for Thomas Tilling Ltd, at the same show the Tylor stand showed a 10hp 4-cylinder engine, a 20hp 2-cylinder engine and a 40hp 4-cylinder engine, all with forced lubrication. All castings in the engines were stated to be made upon the company's premises.

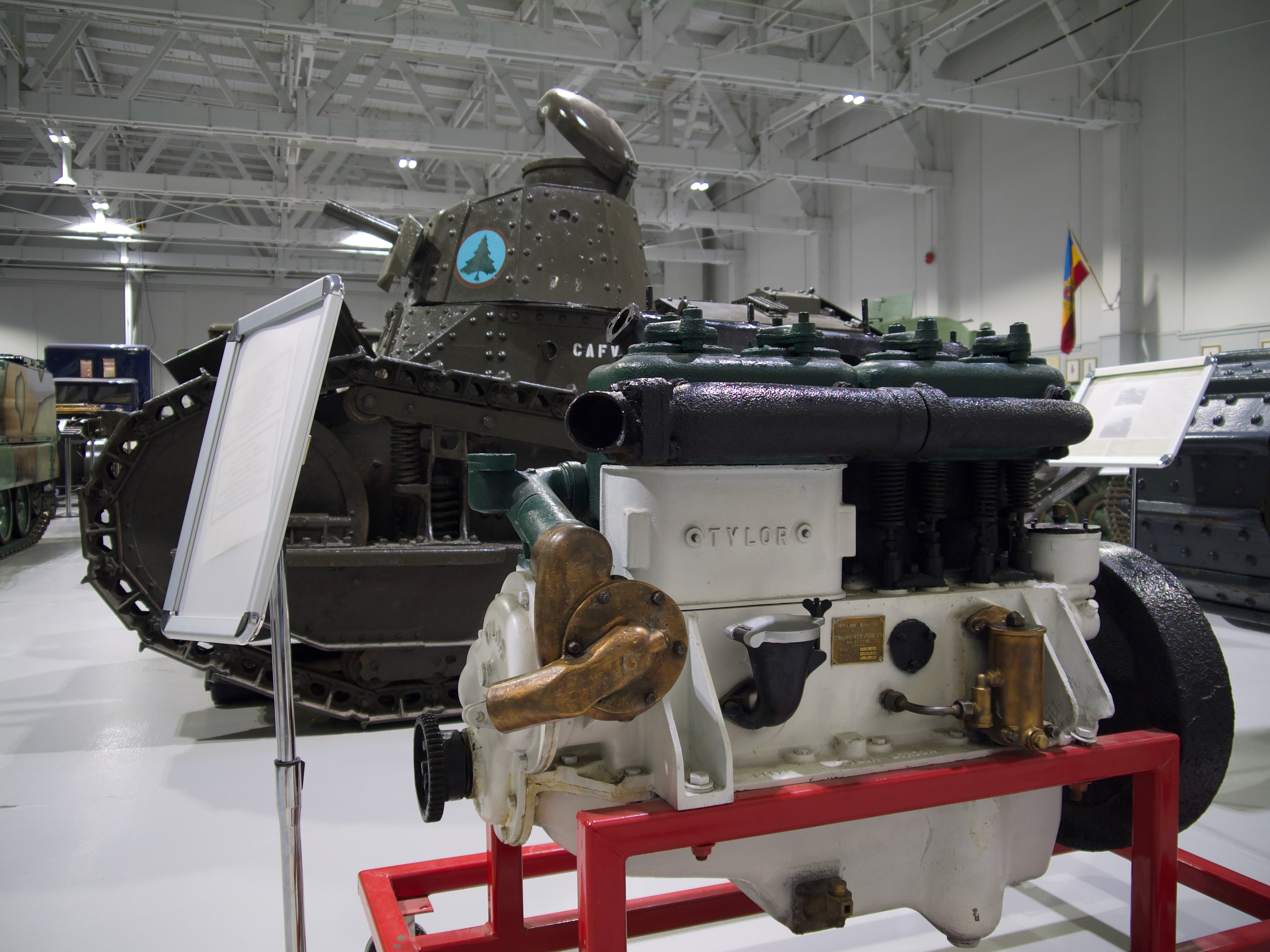
Tylor JB4 engine from Whippet tank

Clayton and Company first started making petrol-driven commercial vehicles in 1908 under the Karrier tradename, and they chose the Tylor engine. Clayton's Karrier 'subsidy' commercial chassis with Tylor engine was certified under the War Office Subsidy Scheme in 1913, and so the Tylor engine was certified for military use during the war. A key success during the First World War was when the Tylor JB4 engine was used in the AEC Y Type military lorry from 1917 (the 1916 Y type had used a Daimler engine), and twin JB4 engines were fitted in the Medium Mark A Whippet tank which went into production in 1917. To achieve the required volume, the production of the Tylor engines was carried out by other companies, such as Guy Motors.

A key success for the Tylor engines was their adoption for use in Watson-class lifeboats. In 1920, adverts for the Angus-Sanderson car claimed that (with one exception) "Tylor engines are fitted to every lifeboat operating on the coast of the British Isles".

Tylor also provided a large V8 engine for an experimental New Zealand railcar - the NZR RM class Thomas Transmission which went into service in 1916, but had problems with its complex petrol-electric transmission, and was not a success.

A smaller engine was also produced (2.3 litres), and was used in the Angus-Sanderson cars from 1919 until 1920. Clayton and Co, makers of the Karrier truck, had used Tylor engines from the outset, but swapped to their own make of engine in mid-1920. Both Tylor and Angus-Sanderson failed shortly afterwards, and the relaunched Angus-Sanderson (1921) Ltd took over what remained of the Tylor company.

In 1925 Tylor (JB4) Ltd was formed to provide spares for the 35,000 JB4 engines still in service, they acquired the remaining stock from the original makers, and other sources.
