= Grahame-White Type VI =

General information
- Type: Military aircraft
- National origin: United Kingdom
- Manufacturer: Grahame-White Aviation
- Designer: J.D. North
- Status: Abandoned
- Primary user: None
- Number built: 1

History
- First flight: 1913

The Grahame-White Type VI was an early British military aircraft manufactured by the Grahame-White Aviation Company. Only one was built but after an abortive flight development was abandoned.

== Design and development ==
Designed by J.D. North, the Grahame-White Type VI was a pusher configuration unequal-span biplane. The tail surfaces were carried on three steel tube booms, with the single upper boom passing through the propeller shaft and the lower pair to the rear of the undercarriage. The propeller was driven by a large-diameter tubular driveshaft and a duplex chain, the propeller being mounted at the top of the rear of the nacelle. There were no centre-section cabane struts, the upper wing being supported solely by the interplane struts. The engine was mounted at the front of the rectangular section nacelle behind a specially made curved radiator, with two crew members seated either side and the pilot seated behind them.

The control wires for the tail surfaces were carried inside the upper boom, an arrangement credited to Horatio Barber, for whose Aeronautical Syndicate Ltd North had worked. The aircraft was armed with a Colt .30-calibre machine gun on a flexible mounting at the front of the nacelle.

While it was originally intended to be powered by a 120 hp (89 kW) Austro-Daimler 6 cylinder inline, it was shown at the 1913 Olympia Aero Exhibition fitted temporarily with a 90 hp (67 kW) Austro-Daimler instead.

Only one attempt was made to fly the Type VI. The underpowered aircraft only just managed to clear the hedge at the boundary of the airfield, and made a forced landing in the next field. North went on to design a broadly similar aircraft with a more conventional four-boom mounting for the tail surfaces, the Grahame-White Type XI.

== Specifications (as shown at Olympia) ==
Data from The British Fighter since 1912

General characteristics

- Crew: 3
- Length: 33 ft 9 in (10.29 m)
- Upper wingspan: 42 ft 6 in (12.95 m)
- Lower wingspan: 23 ft 0 in (7.01 m)
- Wing area: 390 sq ft (36 m^{2})
- Airfoil: Eiffel plane No. 8
- Empty weight: 2,200 lb (998 kg)
- Gross weight: 2,950 lb (1,338 kg)
- Powerplant: 1 × Austro-Daimler 90hp 6-cyl. in-line piston engine, 90 hp (67 kW)
- Propellers: 2-bladed Chauvière, 10 ft (3.0 m) diameter

Performance

- Maximum speed: 70 mph (110 km/h, 61 kn) at sea level
- Endurance: 2¾ hours

Armament

- Guns: 1 Colt .30-calibre machine gun on flexible mounting

== See also ==
Aircraft of comparable role, configuration, and era

- Vickers E.F.B.1
- Royal Aircraft Factory F.E.3
