= Grahame-White Type XIII =

Type XIII

General information
- Type: Racing seaplane
- National origin: United Kingdom
- Manufacturer: Grahame-White Aviation Company
- Designer: J. D. North
- Number built: 1

History
- First flight: 1914

The Grahame-White Type XIII was a racing seaplane built to compete in the Daily Mails 1914 Circuit of Britain air race, to be flown by company founder Claude Grahame-White. It was a conventional single-bay biplane with staggered wings of equal span braced by N-struts. The forward fuselage featured a highly streamlined aluminium engine cowling, with the rest of the construction being wood and fabric. The landing gear consisted of twin pontoons, with a small third pontoon carried beneath the tail.

The Circuit of Britain was cancelled due to the outbreak of World War I, and the sole Type XIII built was later converted into a landplane.

== Specifications ==
General characteristics

- Crew: One pilot
- Capacity: 1 passenger
- Length: 27 ft 3 in (8.31 m)
- Wingspan: 27 ft 10 in (8.48 m)
- Wing area: 290 sq ft (26.9 m^{2})
- Empty weight: 1,040 lb (470 kg)
- Gross weight: 1,800 lb (820 kg)
- Powerplant: 1 × Gnome Monosoupape , 100 hp (75 kW)

Performance

- Maximum speed: 85 mph (136 km/h, 74 kn)
- Endurance: 5 hours 30 minutes
