= AEC Y Type =

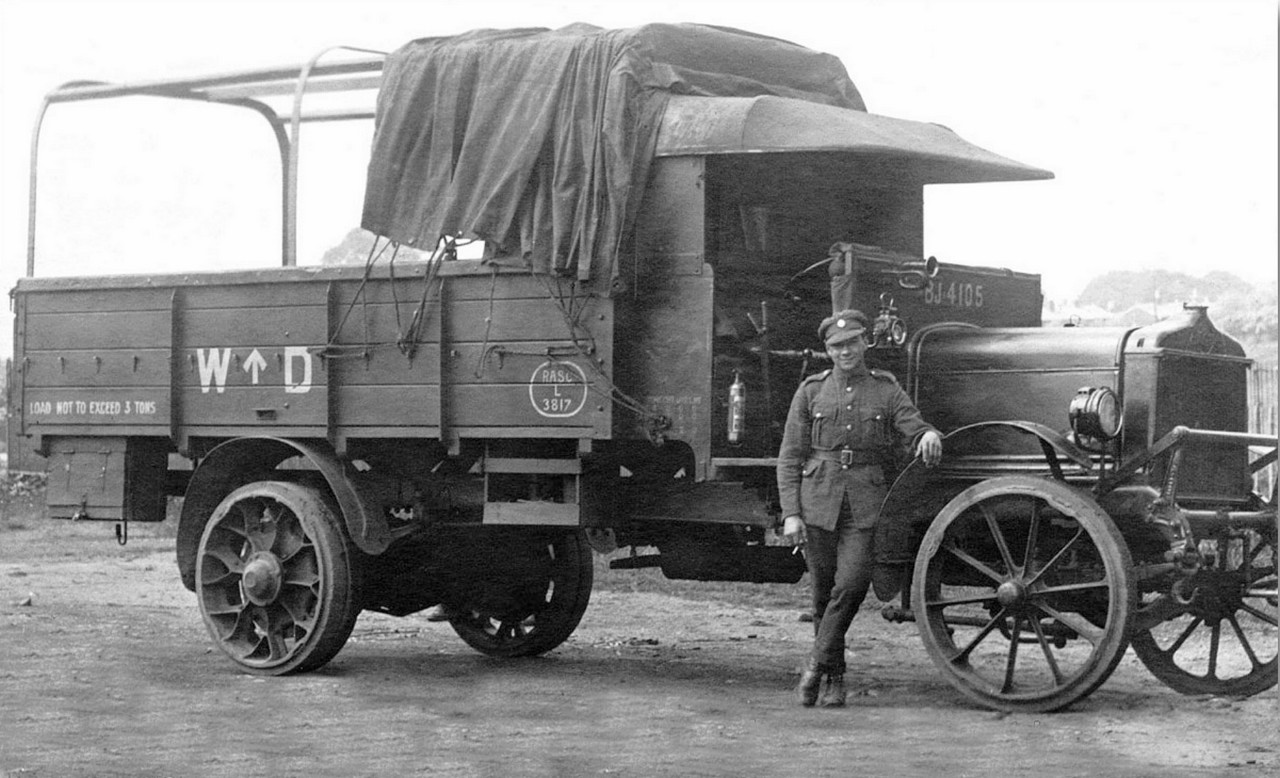
- AEC Y Type, 1917
- Type: 3-ton lorry
- Place of origin: United Kingdom

Service history
- Used by: United Kingdom; United States
- Wars: First World War

Production history
- Designer: Associated Equipment Company
- Manufacturer: Associated Equipment Company
- Produced: 1915–1922
- No. built: ≈10,000
- Variants: Y Type, YA, YB & YC

Specifications
- Mass: 4.21 long tons (4.28 t)
- Length: 23 ft 6 in (7.16 m); 14 ft 3 in (4.34 m) wheelbase
- Width: 6 ft 11 in (2.11 m)
- Height: 10 ft 2 in (3.10 m)
- Engine: Y Type: Daimler inline 4-cylinder 5.7 L petrol 40 bhp (30 kW) at 1,300 rpm YA, YB & YC: Tylor 4-cylinder 7.7 L petrol 49 bhp (37 kW) at 1,300 rpm
- Payload capacity: 3 long tons (3.0 t)
- Drive: 4x2
- Transmission: 4 Forward, 1 reverse gear
- Suspension: Semi-elliptical multi-leaf springs
- Maximum speed: 12 mph (19 km/h)
- References: A complete directory of military vehicles

The AEC Y Type was a British truck built by the Associated Equipment Company (AEC), it saw widespread service with the British Army during the First World War.

== Design ==
The original Y Type was a 3-ton 4x2 truck powered by a Daimler four-cylinder inline 5,700 cc petrol engine that developed 40 brake horsepower (30 kW) at 1,300 rpm, it drove the rear wheels through a four-speed gearbox, the wheels having solid rubber tyres. The Y Type had an open, canvas covered cab and a fixed side timber body, typical of military cargo vehicles of the period.

The YA, introduced in 1917, replaced the Daimler engine with a Tylor four-cylinder inline 7,700 cc petrol engine that developed 49 brake horsepower (37 kW) at 1,300 rpm, the YB introduced a pressed steel frame whilst the YC used a David Brown Ltd. worm-gear final drive.

== History ==
The Y Type was introduced by AEC in March 1915, it was a lower geared development of AEC's earlier X Type, the latter in turn a development of the company's W Type with heavier duty hubs. Whilst AEC was founded in 1912, a sales agreement meant that all of its products were marketed by and branded Daimler, in June 1916 the company's factory, at Walthamstow, was placed under direct government control and the lorries were branded AEC from that date, although the Y Type's distinctive Daimler radiator was retained.

The Y Type was in high demand by British forces during the First World War, in 1917 AEC installed a moving assembly line to make the type, enabling the factory to produce 130 chassis per week. In addition to British forces the type was also used by the United States Army in France. By the Armistice in November 1918, AEC had built 8,821 Y Types, 5200 of which were fitted with the Tylor engine.

The War Office purchased an additional 822 Y Types in 1919 and the type remained in production for civilian customers until 1922. as a 5-ton lorry A number of Y Types were sold to civilian operators after the war, a common conversion saw the military body removed and the chassis used as the basis of an omnibus.
