= NZR RM class (Thomas Transmission) =

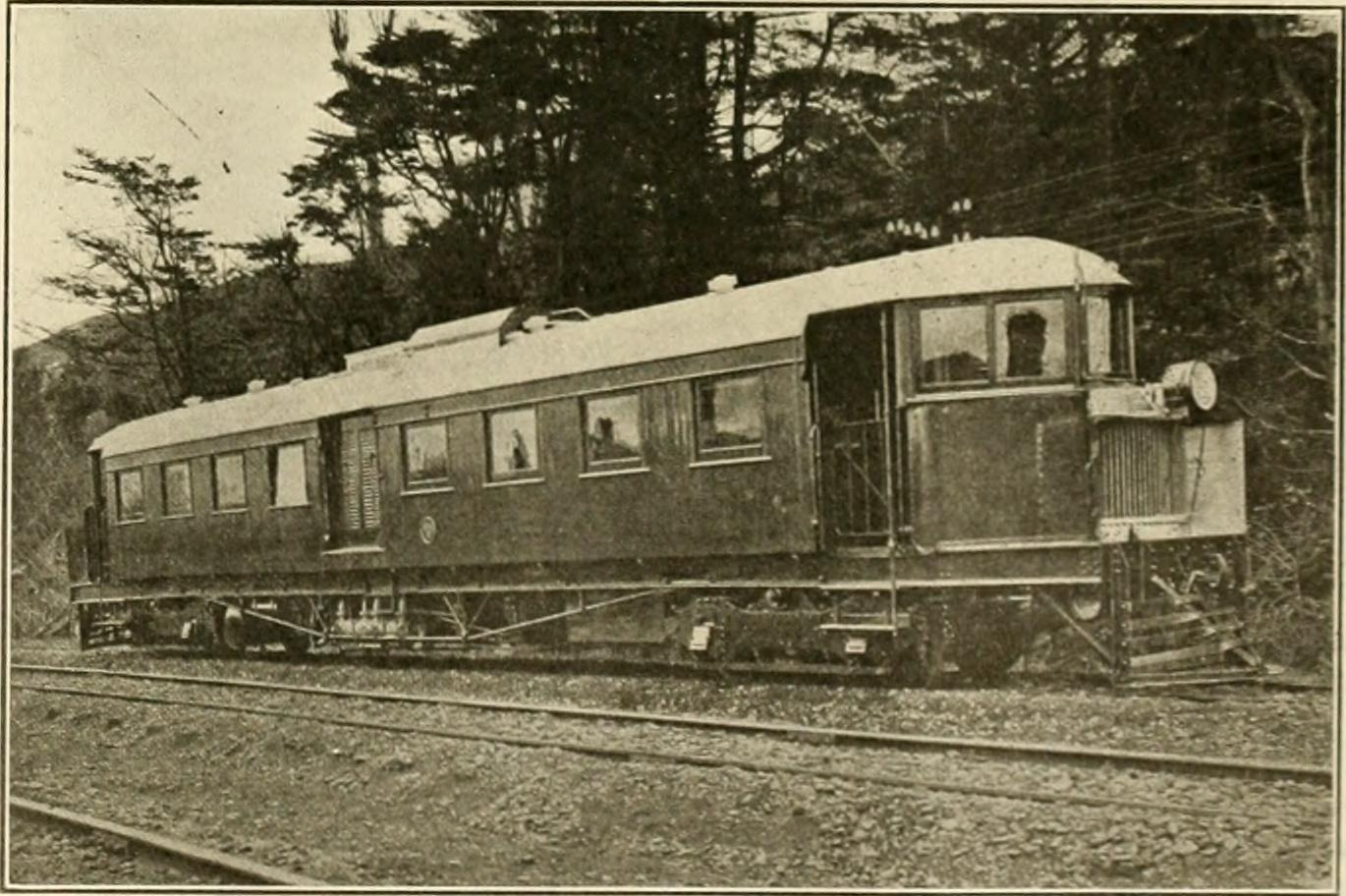
"Thomas Transmission" rail motor car, 1916

The NZR RM class Thomas Transmission railcar was an experimental electro-mechanical railcar operated by the New Zealand Railways Department (NZR). It was introduced to service in 1916 and therefore was one of the earliest railcars to operate in New Zealand.

== Development ==
In the early 20th century, NZR sought a means of providing economic services on lowly trafficked services including some suburban routes and to provide a faster alternative to mixed trains on rural lines. It aimed to develop a light and self-contained vehicle that could operate economically even with low passenger levels. The first true railcar, the MacEwan Pratt petrol railcar of 1912, did not pass its tests and never entered revenue service. It was followed by the Westinghouse railcar in 1914, which did enter revenue service but proved unreliable. Accordingly, in 1916, NZR developed its third railcar, the Thomas Transmission railcar. It was classified as RM 2; the Westinghouse railcar had previously re-used the MacEwan-Pratt railcar's classification of RM 1.

== Technical specifications ==
The body of the railcar was built at Petone Workshops in the Hutt Valley; driver's compartments were located at both ends and it could carry fifty passengers. The railcar employed the Thomas system of transmission, built by Thomas Transmission Ltd. of England. They also supplied the underframe and bogies, and J. Tylor and Sons of London provided the railcar's 150 kW (200 hp) V8 petrol engine. Power from the engine was transmitted to the leading bogie mechanically and to the rear bogie electrically by current produced by a generator within the engine. When engine revolutions passed a certain level, the electrical system was cut and used for battery charging while special clutches and gears allowed the engine to mechanically drive both bogies. Unladen, the railcar weighed approximately 36 tonnes (35 long tons; 40 short tons) and its length was 17.68 metres (58 ft).

== Operation ==
The railcar was designed to reach speeds of 65–70 km/h (40–43 mph) on level track, and 25 km/h (16 mph) while hauling a 25-tonne (25-long-ton; 28-short-ton) carriage up a 1 in 40 (2.5%) grade. Trials were conducted to see if it could achieve these expectations, and in some ways it exceeded them. A 13.25-tonne (13.04-long-ton; 14.61-short-ton) trailer was hauled with ease along the 1 in 35 (2.86%) route between Upper Hutt Railway Station and Mangaroa Railway Station, and on the level it could haul two bogie passenger carriages and a brake van at 58 km/h (36 mph).

The railcar was subsequently introduced to service, operating the steep route out of Wellington to Johnsonville along what was then the North Island Main Trunk Railway and has, since the 1937 opening of the Tawa Flat deviation, been the Johnsonville Branch. This route was also operated by the Westinghouse railcar until 1917, when its repeated failures caused it to be permanently withdrawn from service. A similar but temporary fate befell the Thomas Transmission railcar; it gave good service for a few months but then had to be mothballed as a critical component of its transmission failed and World War I restricted the ability of NZR to source a replacement. In 1920, the railcar was finally returned to service. It suffered further reliability problems and did not operate for long. It was written off in 1925 and NZR sold its body to private interests for use as a dwelling.
