= Grahame-White G.W.E.7 =

British transport biplane

General information
- Type: Biplane airliner
- National origin: United Kingdom
- Manufacturer: Grahame-White Aviation Company
- Designer: M Boudot
- Status: Destroyed
- Number built: 1

History
- First flight: 1919

The Grahame-White G.W.E.7 was a British twin-engined transport biplane, designed by M Boudot. It was built by Grahame-White Aviation Company at Hendon.

== Development ==
The G.W.E.7 was a luxury transport biplane with folding wings. It seated four passengers in a cabin in the nose with the pilot behind. It is powered by two 320 hp (239 kW) Rolls-Royce Eagle V piston engines. The only G.W.E.7, registered G-EALR was first flown in 1919. It was damaged beyond repair in a forced landing at Hendon in the same year. The damaged remains were burned in 1920.

== Specifications ==
Data from British Civil Aircraft since 1919, Volume 2

General characteristics

- Crew: 2
- Capacity: 4
- Length: 39 ft 0 in (11.89 m)
- Wingspan: 60 ft 0 in (18.29 m)
- Empty weight: 5,785 lb (2,624 kg)
- Gross weight: 7,947 lb (3,605 kg)
- Powerplant: 2 × Rolls-Royce Eagle V piston engine , 320 hp (239 kW) each

Performance

- Maximum speed: 116 mph (186 km/h, 101 kn)
