= Grahame-White Type VII =

Early British aircraft

Grahame-White Type VII "Popular"

General information
- Type: Sports aircraft
- National origin: United Kingdom
- Designer: J. D. North

History
- First flight: 1913

The Graham-White Type VII "Popular" was an early British aircraft designed by J. D. North and built by the Grahame-White Aviation company, with the intention of producing a low-cost aircraft to popularize aviation. It was initially produced with a 35 hp Anzani 3-cylinder Y configuration engine and offered for sale at a price of less than £400. Despite its low price the aircraft included structural refinements such as hollow-section interplane struts. It was first flown in 1913.

== Design and development ==
The aircraft was a pusher biplane with a square section nacelle mounted between the upper and lower wings, which were of two-spar construction, the spars being ash I-sections. To maintain the leading edge section there were half-ribs between each rib, these extending from the leading edge to the main spar. A single horizontal tailplane with a split elevator and a rudder divided into two part, half above and half below the tailplane, were carried on ash booms behind the wing, the booms being connected by hollow wooden vertical struts and tubular steel horizontal members. The booms were spindled to an I-section except at the points of attachment of the cross-members. The upper wing was double the span of the lower and had wide-span ailerons occupying the whole trailing edge outboard of the tail booms. The wings were connected by a single pair of struts on either side, the outer section of the upper wing being braced by wires leading to inverted-V kingposts. The wide-track undercarriage consisted of a pair of long laminated wood skids each bearing pair of wheels on a short axle. No tailskid was fitted.

The Type VII was built in both single and two seat versions and some were fitted with the 50 hp (37 kW) Gnome Omega engine, which would have increased the price considerably as well as improving performance, since this engine cost around £500.

== Operational history ==
In March 1913, the British War Office, in an attempt to boost the numerical strength of the Royal Flying Corps announced the purchase of seven aircraft from the Grahame-White company, including two Type VII Populars and one two-seat VIIc Popular Passenger Biplane (which despite the name was unrelated to the single-seat Type VII). Although the purchase of two of the single-seat type VIIs was announced, it appears that only one was taken on charge. While allocated the serial number 283, the aircraft saw little if any use by the RFC.

== Specifications ==
Data from British Aircraft 1809-1914

General characteristics

- Crew: 1
- Capacity: 1
- Length: 23 ft 6 in (7.16 m)
- Upper wingspan: 28 ft (8.5 m)
- Lower wingspan: 14 ft (4.3 m)
- Wing area: 205 sq ft (19.0 m^{2})
- Airfoil: Eiffel 13 bis
- Gross weight: 600 lb (272 kg)
- Powerplant: 1 × Anzani 3-cylinder air-cooled fan engine, 35 hp (26 kW)
- Propellers: 2-bladed wooden propeller

Performance

- Maximum speed: 50 mph (80 km/h, 43 kn)
- Endurance: 4 hours
