= Grahame-White Bantam =

Bantam

General information
- Type: Single-seat sporting biplane
- National origin: United Kingdom
- Manufacturer: Grahame-White Aviation Company
- Designer: M Boudot
- Number built: 3

History
- First flight: 1919

The Grahame-White G.W.E.6 Bantam was a British single-seat sporting biplane, designed by M Boudot and built by Grahame-White Aviation Company at Hendon.

== Development ==
The Bantam was a conventional biplane powered by a nose-mounted 80 hp (60 kW) Le Rhône rotary engine with a single open cockpit. Two aircraft took part in the 1919 Aerial Derby at Hendon Aerodrome, but neither finished the race. A third example was flown in South Africa in the 1920s.

== Specifications ==
Data from

General characteristics

- Crew: 1
- Length: 16 ft 6 in (5.03 m)
- Wingspan: 20 ft 0 in (6.1 m)
- Empty weight: 640 lb (290 kg)
- Gross weight: 995 lb (451 kg)
- Powerplant: 1 × Le Rhône 9C rotary engine , 80 hp (60 kW)

Performance

- Maximum speed: 100 mph (160 km/h, 87 kn)
- Service ceiling: 17,000 ft
- Rate of climb: 1,100 ft/min
