= Grahame-White Ganymede =

Prototype British heavy night bomber

Ganymede

General information
- Type: Heavy bomber
- National origin: United Kingdom
- Manufacturer: Grahame-White Aviation Company
- Number built: 1

The Grahame-White Ganymede was a prototype British heavy night bomber intended to serve with the Royal Air Force in the First World War. A large, three-engined, twin-boom biplane, the sole prototype Ganymede did not fly until after the war had ended, and although an attempt was made to convert the aircraft to an airliner, it was unsuccessful.

== Development and design ==
In 1918, the Grahame-White Aviation Company of Hendon, London developed a large, long-range heavy bomber intended to equip the Royal Air Force. The resulting design, the E.IV Ganymede, was of unusual layout, being a three-engined, twin-boom biplane with four-bay wings. Two of the engines were located at the front of the booms, driving tractor propellers, while the third engine was installed at the rear of the central nacelle, driving a pusher propeller. A biplane tail unit with three fins and rudders spanned the gap between the two main fuselage booms. The two pilots and a bomb-aimer/gunner were accommodated in the central nacelle, while additional gunners cockpits were provided in each of the fuselage booms, with Scarff ring mountings for a machine gun together with a tunnel opening under the fuselages to allow the gunners to repel attacks from below.

It was intended that the Ganymede be powered by three 400 hp (298 kW) Liberty engines, but concerns about the availability of the American-built Liberty resulted in considerably less powerful Sunbeam Maori engines being specified when an order was placed for three prototypes. The first of these prototypes, serial number C3481 was completed late in 1918. While it was tested by the Air Ministry during 1919, the RAF had little interest in purchasing a new heavy bomber, and the remaining two prototypes were cancelled.

After being damaged in a landing accident in 1919, Grahame-White rebuilt the Ganymede into a civil airliner, becoming the E.9 Ganymede. The central engine was removed completely, while the two remaining engines were replaced by 450 hp (336 kW) Napier Lions. The nacelle was rebuilt with two pilots in an open cockpit ahead of a glazed cabin housing 12 passengers. The modified aircraft was granted a Certificate of Airworthiness on 12 September 1919, with the Aircraft registration G-EAMW, but was destroyed in a fire in September 1920.

== Specifications (Bomber) ==
Data from The British Bomber since 1914

General characteristics

- Crew: 2
- Length: 49 ft 9 in (15.16 m)
- Wingspan: 89 ft 3 in (27.20 m)
- Height: 16 ft 0 in (4.88 m)
- Wing area: 1,660 sq ft (154 m^{2})
- Empty weight: 11,500 lb (5,216 kg)
- Gross weight: 16,000 lb (7,257 kg)
- Powerplant: 3 × Sunbeam Maori V-12 water-cooled piston engine, 270 hp (200 kW) each
- Propellers: 4-bladed fixed-pitch propeller

Performance

- Maximum speed: 105 mph (169 km/h, 91 kn)
- Endurance: 9 hours
- Wing loading: 9.64 lb/sq ft (47.1 kg/m^{2})
- Power/mass: 0.051 hp/lb (0.084 kW/kg)

Armament

- Guns: 3x .303 in (7.7 mm) Lewis guns, One in nose of central nacelle and one in each outer fuselage
- Bombs: Bombload unknown

== See also ==
Aircraft of comparable role, configuration, and era

- Caproni Ca.1
- Siddeley Sinaia
- Tarrant Tabor
- Bristol Braemar
