= Cubitt (car) =

British motor vehicle

Coordinates: 51.821697°N 0.822607°W

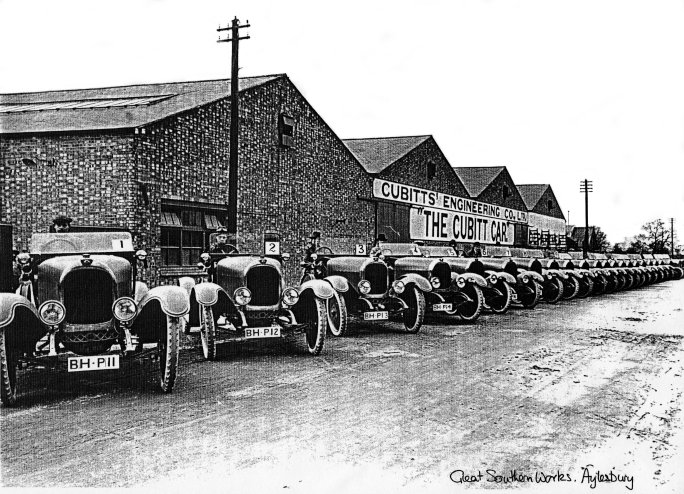
Twenty Cubitt 16/20s in publicity image at the Cubitt Car Factory, Great Southern Works, Bicester Road, Aylesbury. c.1922

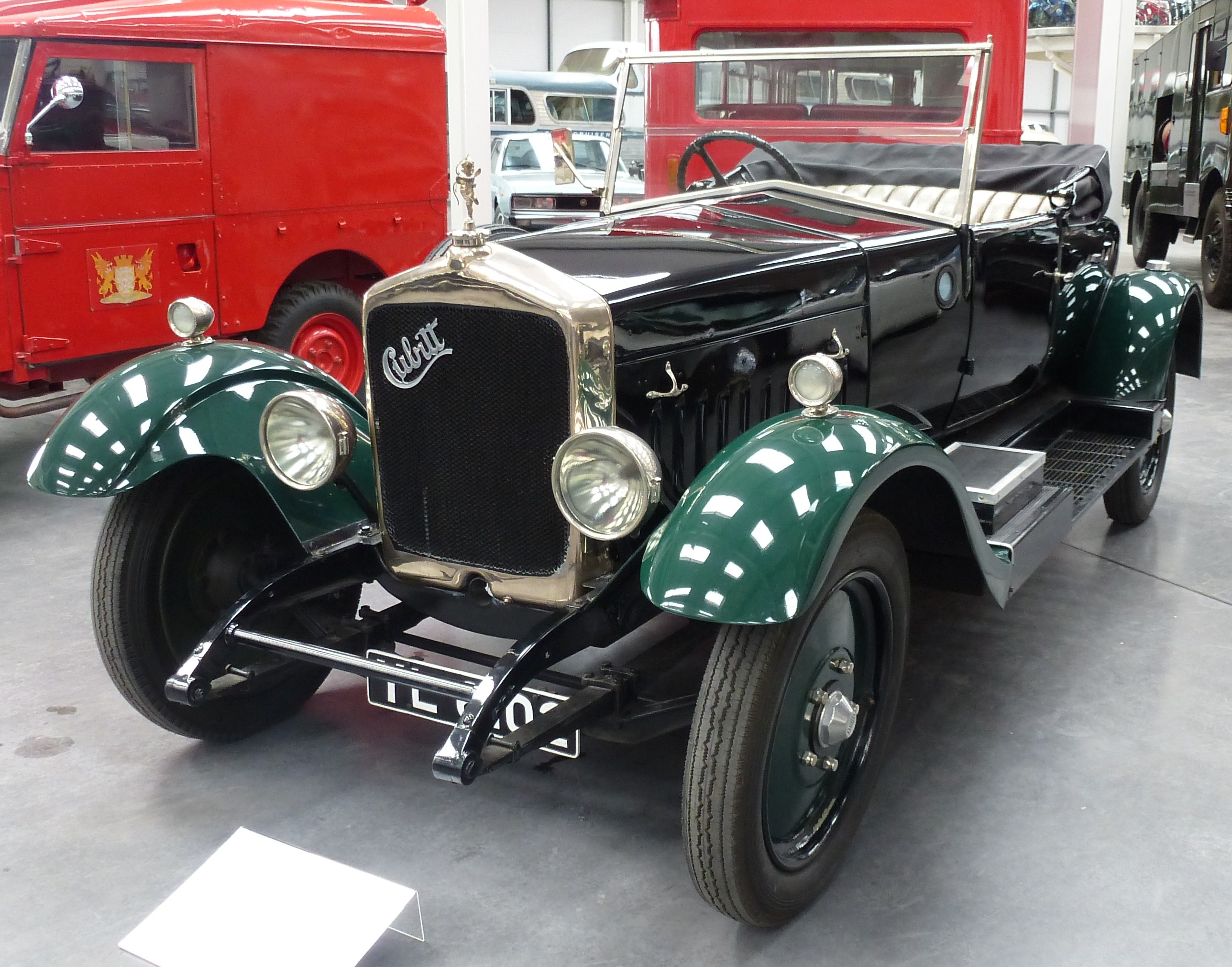
Cubitt K4 1925

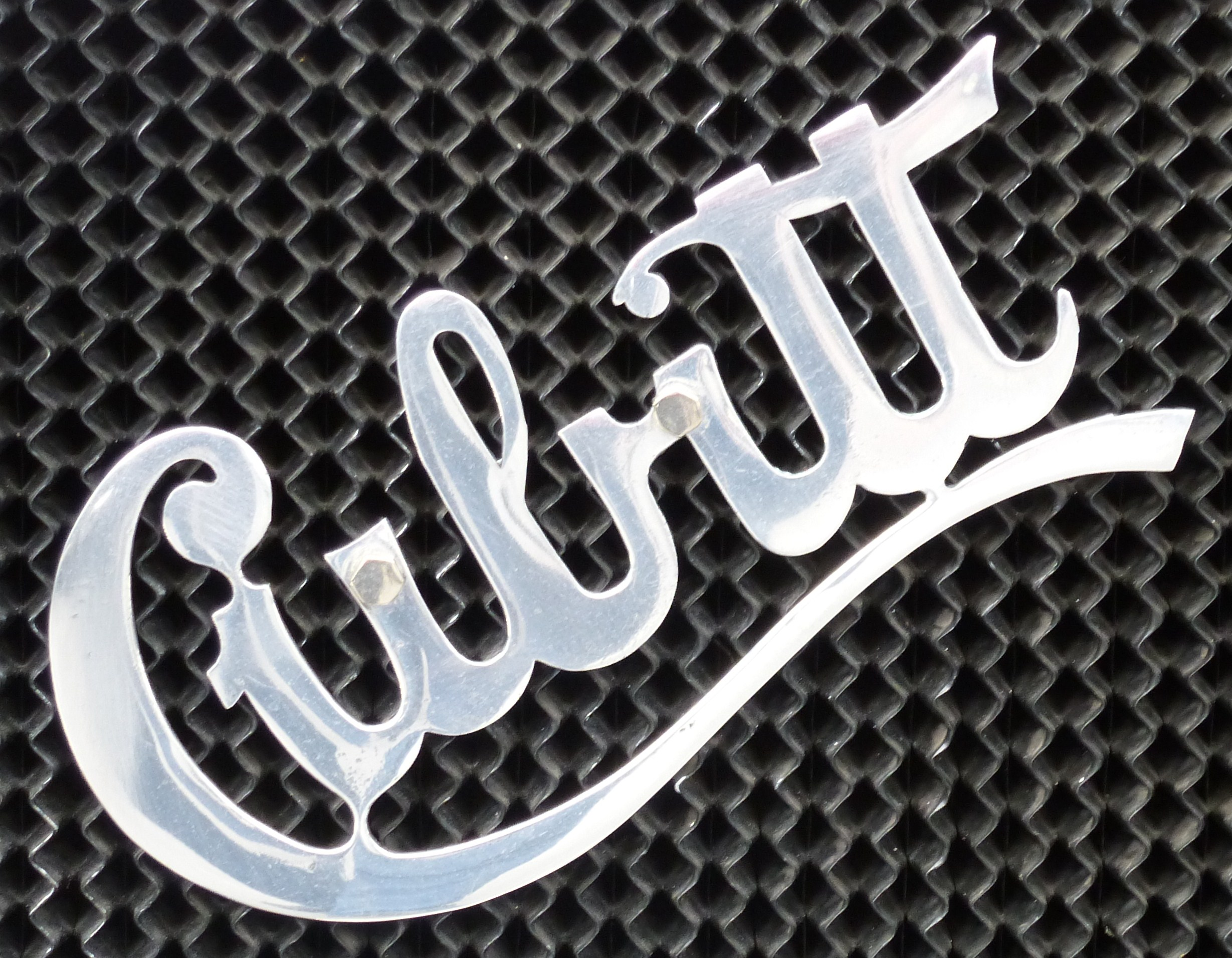
Cubitt radiator logo

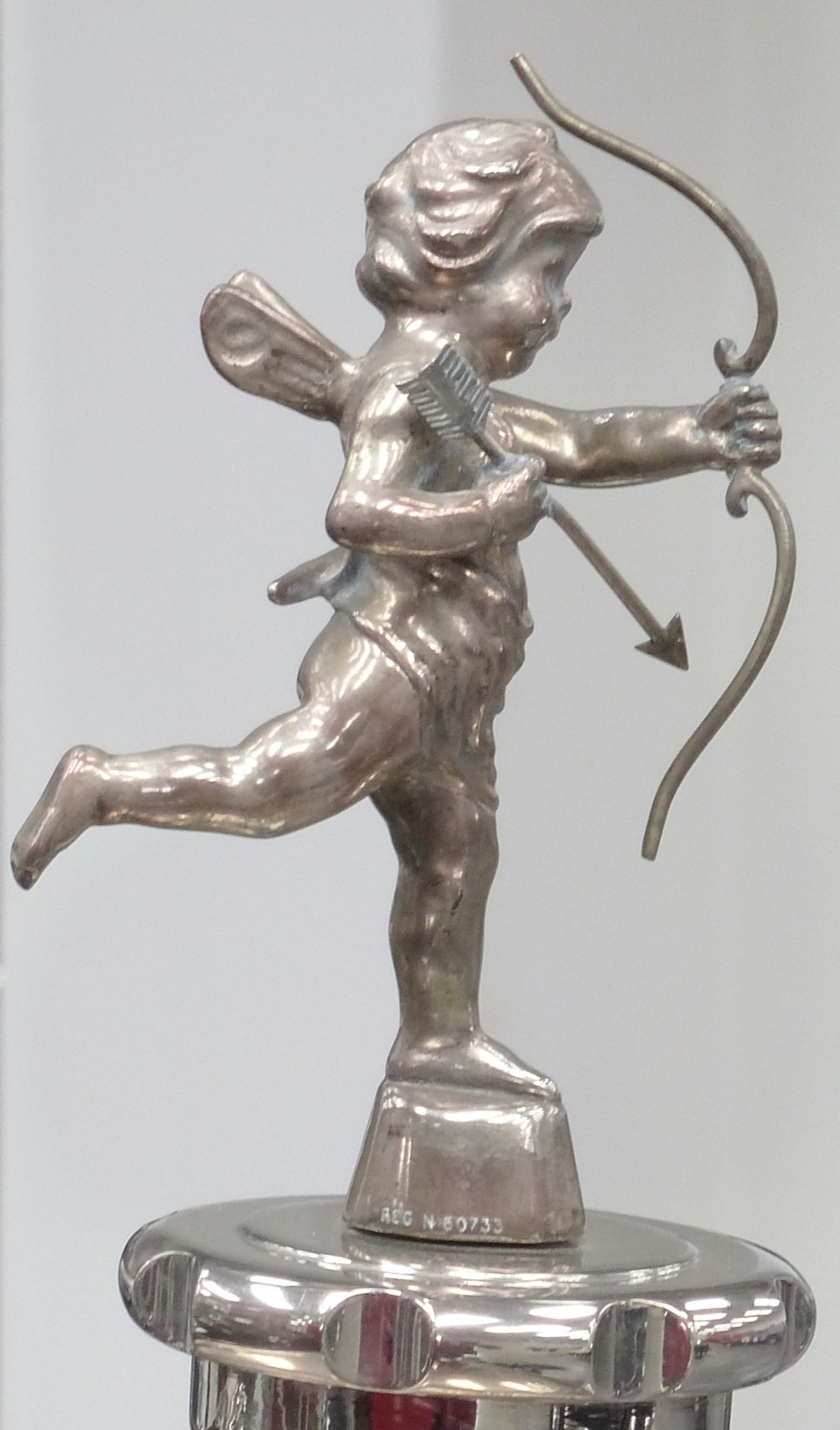
Cubitt bonnet mascot

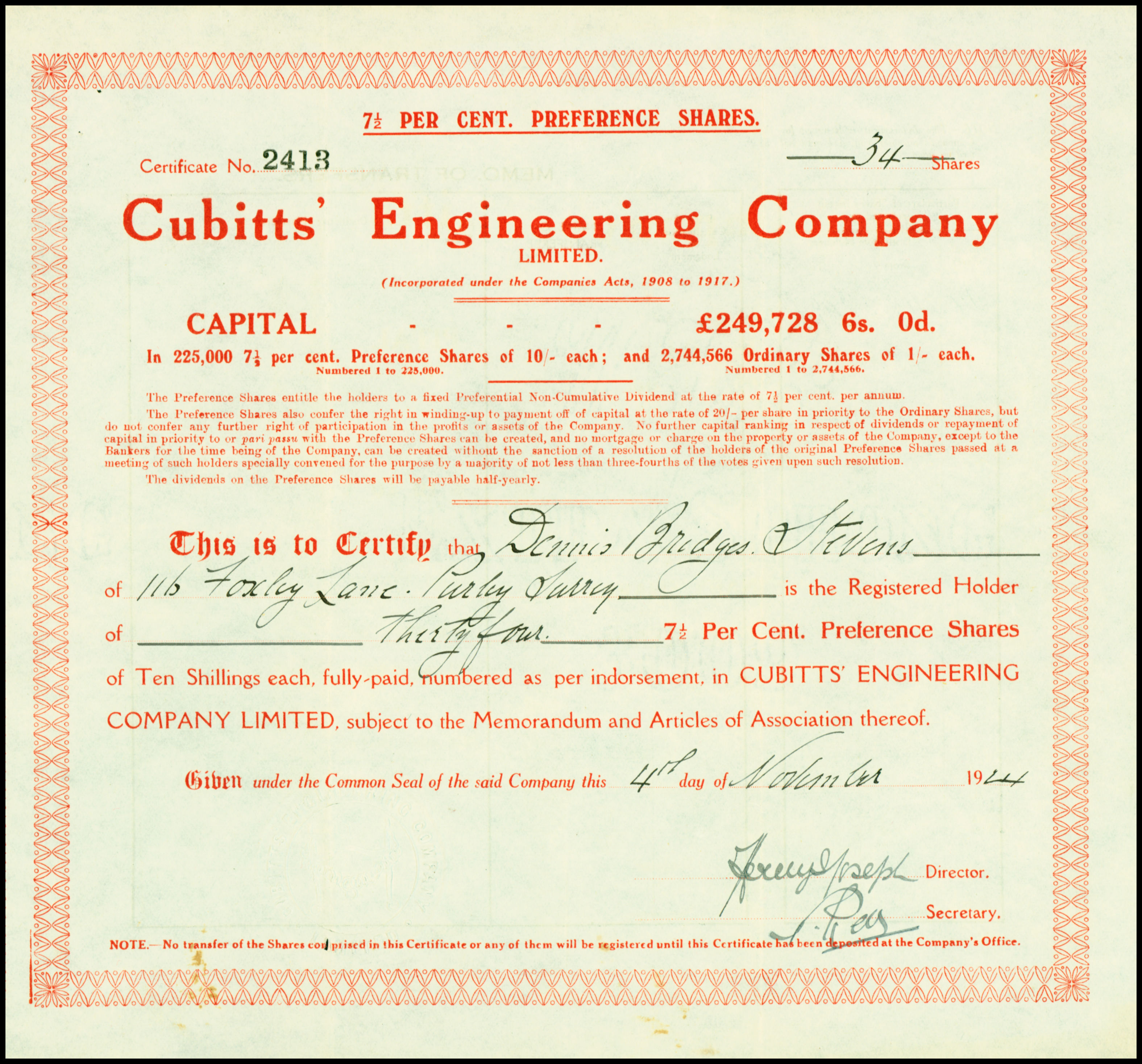
Share of Cubitts' Engineering Company Ltd., issued 4. November 1924

Cubitt was a British motor vehicle manufactured in Aylesbury, Buckinghamshire from 1920 to 1925. Around 3,000 vehicles were built.

== History ==
The Cubitts Engineering Co. Ltd. was originally a construction company which built much of Central London - Covent Garden Market, the Cenotaph and the 'new' east wing of Buckingham Palace. It had been founded by Thomas Cubitt around 1815, in association with his brothers William and Lewis. In 1883 the business was acquired by Holland & Hannen, a leading competitor, and became known as Holland & Hannen and Cubitts and subsequently as Holland, Hannen & Cubitts.

In 1920 they began manufacturing motor vehicles at the Great Southern Works on the Bicester Road in Aylesbury under the name Cubitt, completing circa 3,000 motor vehicles between 1920 and 1925. Cubitt employed mass production techniques to compete with the flood of American imports, and they openly stated that it was an American type car, simple and rugged. Manufacturing difficulties, primarily with component suppliers, prevented both the 5,000 per year target and the low target price.

In 1922 S.F. Edge (director of Napier cars; director of British Anzani; and managing director of AC Cars) bought the company and also became managing director. He employed J.S. Napier (of Arrol-Johnston not of Napier Cars) as both director and designer, who went on to introduce the reduced weight side-valve version of the engine for the K4 and L4 models.

In January 1925 (or 1924) Edge decided that AC Cars would manufacture their own version of the Anzani engine at the Aylesbury works and thus cancelled the order for 30 engines a month from Anzani - this engine production probably only continued until c.1927.

In February 1925 a receiver was appointed, Cubitt was declared bankrupt and third party investors, such as James Putman of Farringdon, lost a lot of money.

After the demise of Cubitt motor manufacturing in 1925 and the A.C. Cars engine manufacture circa 1927, the Great Southern Works was involved in other piecemeal projects including making shop-fittings until it was demolished and redeveloped for domestic housing in the 21st century. The marque is commemorated by 'Cubitt Street' (and Edge Street) which traverse the old works.

== Models ==
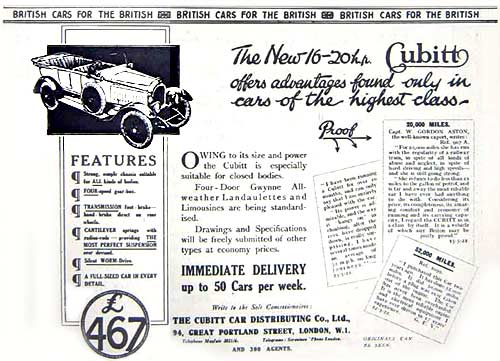
Cubitt advert ( circa 1921) for publication in contemporary media

The 16/20 used 2.8 litre, 4 cylinder engines with coil ignition, plus a four speed gearbox with a central gear lever. Unusually the final drive was by a worm gear arrangement. It was a family car that could achieve 50 mph for £442, and was considered good value by contemporary motoring magazines. The body cost £20 to build and the car was described as high and heavy, although it was also possible to have a body fitted by a different company. The slogans were Big value for little money and The right car at the right price.

In 1925 the K4 and L4 models were introduced featuring a new engine of the same capacity, but lightened and simplified by conversion to side valves instead of overhead valves, use of aluminium pistons and lighter connecting rods. The side-valve engine may have been for streamlined production, cost, reliability or weight-saving reasons. The cantilever rear springs were replaced with semi-elliptic springs and the rear axle was fitted with an underslung worm drive. The K4 used a 3 metre wheelbase and the L4 was approximately a foot longer.

Model	Available	Cylinders	Capacity	Wheelbase
16/20 hp	1923–1925	4 In line, Overhead valves	2815 cm³	3048–3200 mm
K4	1925	4 In line, side valves	2815 cm³	3073 mm
L4	1925	4 In line, side valves	2815 cm³	3226 mm

== See also ==
- Automotive industry in the United Kingdom
- Timeline of motor vehicle brands
- List of car manufacturers of the United Kingdom
