= Grahame-White Type XV =

Type XV, Box-kite

General information
- Type: Military trainer
- National origin: United Kingdom
- Manufacturer: Grahame-White Aviation Company
- Primary users: Royal Naval Air Service Royal Flying Corps
- Number built: 135

History
- First flight: 1913

The Grahame White Type XV was a military trainer biplane produced in the United Kingdom before and during World War I. It is often referred to as the Box-kite, although this name more properly describes the Grahame-White Type XII, an earlier aircraft made by the company, from which the Type XV was derived. It is also known as the Admiralty Type 1600, since the first aircraft of the type purchased for the Royal Naval Air Service was given that serial number, and contemporary practice was to assign type numbers based on the serial number of the first example in service.

The aircraft itself was a pod-and-boom configuration biplane with three-bay unstaggered wings. In early models, two seats were fitted on the leading edge of the lower wing for the instructor and the trainee pilot; in later models, space was provided for them in tandem in an open-topped nacelle, with the engine mounted pusher-fashion behind them. The empennage was carried on four parallel beams extending two each from the top and bottom wings, and consisted of twin rudders and a horizontal stabiliser and elevator that were carried on the top two beams. Early production aircraft had wings of equal span, but later examples had long extensions fitted to increase the span of the upper wing. The landing gear comprised two separate, wing-mounted, 'two-wheel plus skid' assemblies and a tail-skid.

The Type XV was extensively used as a trainer by both the RNAS and RFC, with 135 machines being purchased for this purpose. In November 1913, one RFC Type XV was employed in the first British trials of firing a machine gun (a Lewis gun) from an aircraft at targets on the ground. Despite the number of aircraft produced, little documentation on the type has survived.

Three Type XVs survived the First World War to become civil aircraft, being some of the first aircraft to bear British aircraft registrations once civil flying was permitted in 1919.

== Operators ==
Australia

- Australian Flying Corps
  - Central Flying School, Point Cook, Victoria

United Kingdom

- Royal Flying Corps
  - No. 65 Squadron RFC
- Royal Naval Air Service

== Specifications ==
General characteristics

- Crew: Two, pilot and instructor
- Powerplant: 1 × Gnome et Rhône Gnome air-cooled rotary engine , 80 hp (60 kW)
