= Charlie Watkins (footballer) =

Scottish footballer and manager

Personal information
- Full name: Charles Watkins
- Date of birth: 14 January 1921
- Place of birth: Glasgow, Scotland
- Date of death: 22 February 1998 (aged 77)
- Place of death: Hitchin, England
- Position: Midfielder

Youth career
- St Anthony's

Senior career*
Years	Team	Apps	(Gls)
1946–1948	Rangers	9	(0)
1948–1954	Luton Town	218	(16)

Managerial career
- 1964–1965: Luton Town (caretaker)
- * Club domestic league appearances and goals

Charles Watkins (14 January 1921 – 22 February 1998) was a Scottish professional football player and manager. After starting out with Glasgow non-league club St Anthony's, he joined Rangers in 1942. Moving south with English Second Division club Luton Town in 1948, he made 239 appearances for the Bedfordshire club before retiring. Re-joining Luton in the early 1960s as part of the coaching staff, Watkins spent a short spell during the 1964–65 season as caretaker manager.

On leaving football, Charlie Watkins went on to run a newsagents for many years, with his family, in the Warden Hills area of Luton.
