= Charles Horace Watkins =

Welsh aviator and inventor (1887–1976)

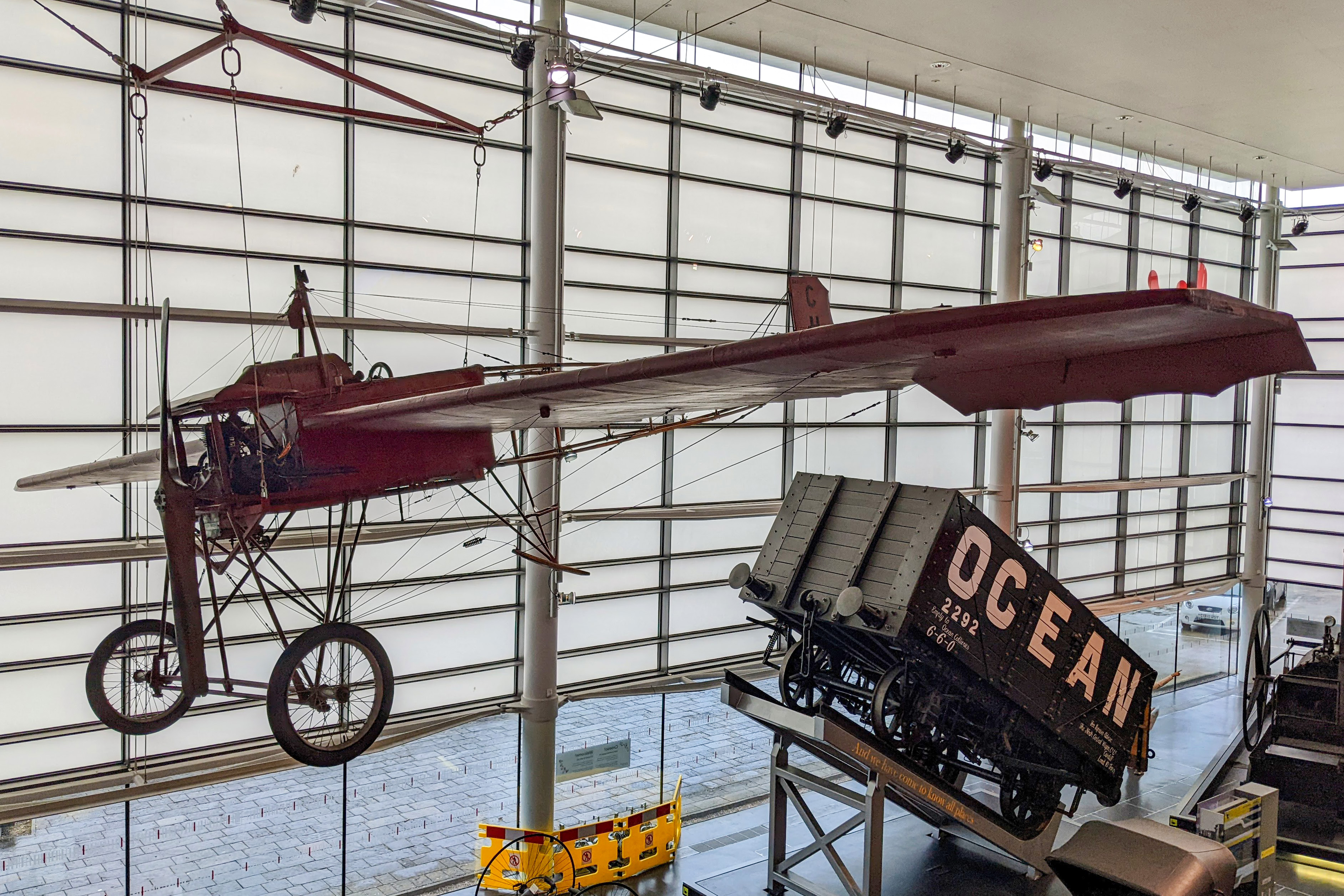
The Robin Goch at the National Waterfront Museum, Swansea

Charles Horace Watkins (1887–1976) was an inventor and aviation pioneer who built the first engine-powered aeroplane in Wales, a red monoplane called the Robin Goch (Welsh for "Red Robin").

Watkins was born in 1887 to Samuel and Lydia (Dutton) Watkins of Cardiff. He designed and constructed a small monoplane between 1907–09 at Maindy in Cardiff and claimed he flew the plane over short distances in 1910, followed by longer flights later, although none of these claims have official verification. As William Frost's own flight at Saundersfoot in 1896 was never officially recorded, then Watkins effort may have been the first official heavier-than-air flight in Wales. The plane is now preserved at the National Waterfront Museum in Swansea.
