= Eleanor Trehawke Davies =

English aviator (1880–1915)

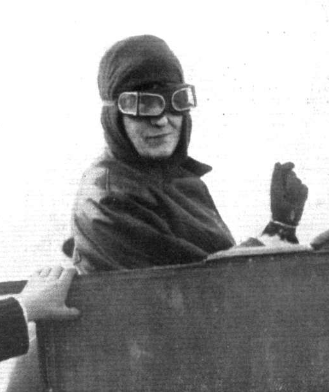
- At Hendon in 1912
- Born: Eleanor Josephine Davies; 1880; London, England
- Died: 1915 (aged 34–35); London, England
- Known for: aviator

Eleanor Josephine Trehawke Davies (1880 – 1915) was an English aviator and the first woman to fly across the English Channel and to have "looped the loop" in an aircraft. She described the latter experience as "a grand, whirling delight".

== Early life ==
Davies was born in 1880 in St Pancras, London, the daughter of Eleanor Rosa (née Springbett) and Frederick Trehawke Davies. Her father was an Alderman with Marylebone Council and a solicitor's clerk, her mother the owner of a high end millinery business based at 293 Regent Street, London.

== Aviator ==
Davies who was known as "Miss Trehawke Davies" was never a pilot but known at the time as an "air companion" to a number of early aviators. In August 1911 she chartered Horatio Barber to fly her from Hendon to Brighton and back. The flight, hampered by cloud and high winds, took two days.

In April 1912 she flew with Gustav Hamel on a flight from Hendon Aerodrome near London to Paris, gaining the distinction of being the first woman to fly the English Channel. She also flew with Hamel at the 1912 Whitsun meeting at Hendon, winning the altitude competition, and in June 1912 she was with Hamel when he won the 1912 Aerial Derby around London. In September 1912 she flew with Henry Astley in a failed attempt to fly from Issy-les-Moulineaux to Berlin in one day: returning from Liege to London with Astley on 18 September in his Blériot monoplane they crashed from a height of 450 ft (135m) near Lille, but Astley and Davies were unhurt.

On 2 January 1914 she was a passenger in Hamel's Morane-Saulnier monoplane when it "looped the loop" seven times in one flight: this made Davies the first woman ever to do this aerobatic manoeuvre. She described the experience as "a grand, whirling delight" and was reported to have undertaken the flight against her doctor's orders.

In 1913 she was awarded a trophy by the Women's Aerial League for her services to aviation. In August 1914 she presented her Blériot Monoplane Seaplane to the Royal Naval Air Service.

Davies died of natural causes at her home in Portland Place in London on 22 November 1915 having suffered lifelong health problems although her death was not announced until January 1916, at her own request.
