= Grahame-White Type XI =

Type XI

General information
- Type: Military utility aircraft
- National origin: United Kingdom
- Manufacturer: Grahame-White Aviation Company

The Grahame-White Type XI (also known as the "Naval and Military Biplane") was an early aircraft built in the United Kingdom and marketed as being particularly well-suited to military applications. It was a two-bay biplane of pod-and-boom configuration with unstaggered wings of slightly unequal span. The pilot and an observer sat in tandem, open cockpits in a streamlined nacelle, with the engine mounted pusher-fashion behind them. Unusually for an aircraft of this period, the propeller was not driven directly by the engine, but rather, via a sprocket and chain system that geared it down in the ratio of 14/23. The undercarriage was of the fixed, tailskid type but was designed to be easily exchanged for pontoons. Construction throughout was fabric-covered wood, with the exception of a neat aluminium cowling for the engine and transmission. A sample was exhibited at the Olympia Aero Show in 1914.

== Specifications ==
General characteristics

- Crew: Two, pilot and observer
- Length: 26 ft 6 in (8.08 m)
- Wingspan: 37 ft 0 in (11.28 m)
- Empty weight: 1,000 lb (455 kg)
- Powerplant: 1 × Gnome Monosoupape 9 Type B-2 , 100 hp (75 kW)

Performance

- Maximum speed: 80 mph (130 km/h, 70 kn)
- Endurance: 5 hours
