= Charles James Watkins =

English entomologist (1846–1906)

Charles James Watkins (12 July 1846 – 27 May 1906) was an English entomologist known for his studies on the natural history of Gloucestershire. He was elected a Fellow of the Entomological Society of London in 1900. His extensive collection of insects, noted for its completeness and rare specimens, was acquired by the Bristol Museum & Art Gallery after his death.
