= Aeroprakt A-26 Vulcan =

Ukrainian twin engine aircraft

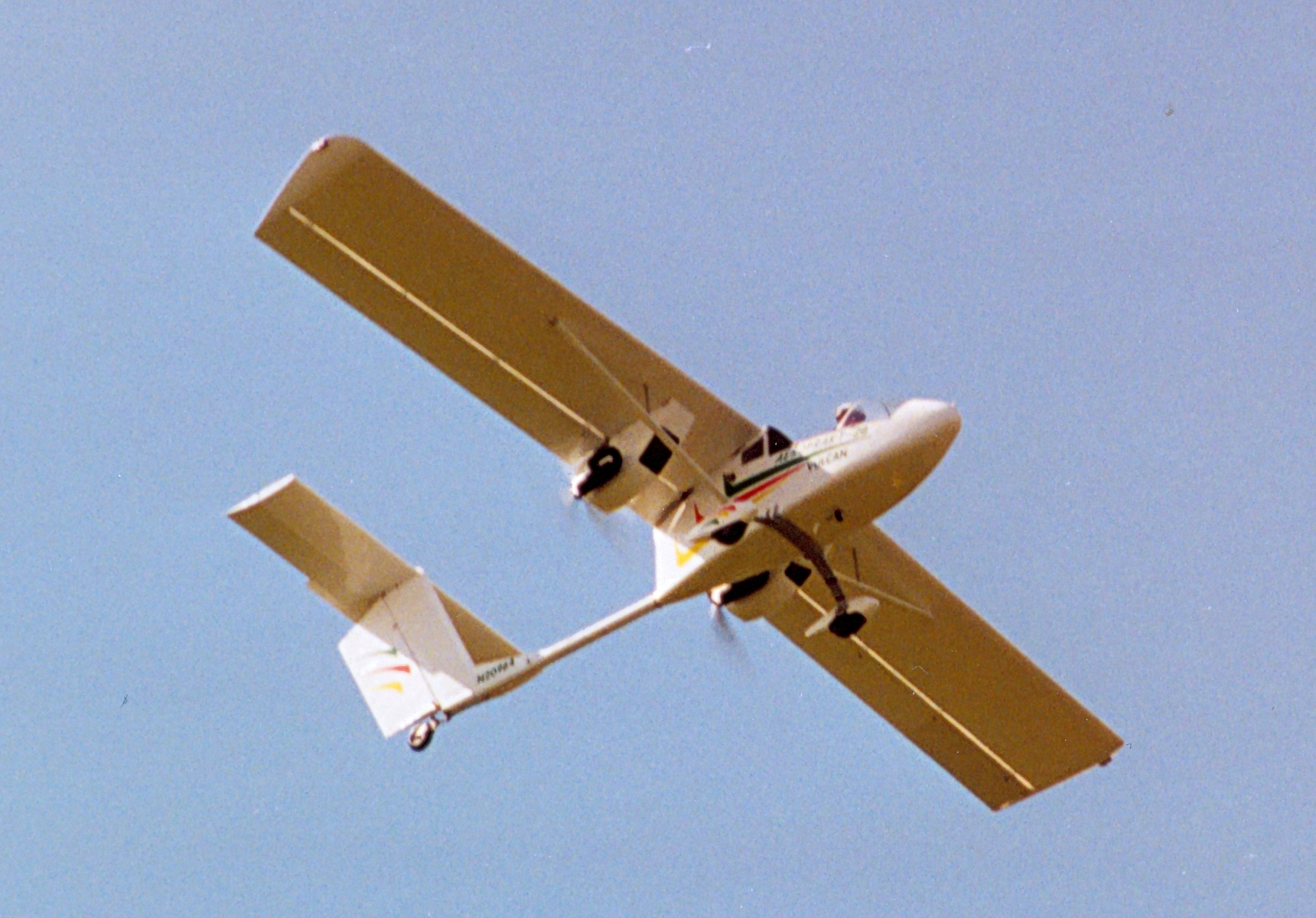
- A-26 Vulcan in flight

General information
- Type: Light twin
- National origin: Ukraine
- Manufacturer: Aeroprakt
- Designer: Yuri Yakovlev

History
- Developed from: Aeroprakt A-20
- Variant: Aeroprakt A-36 Vulcan

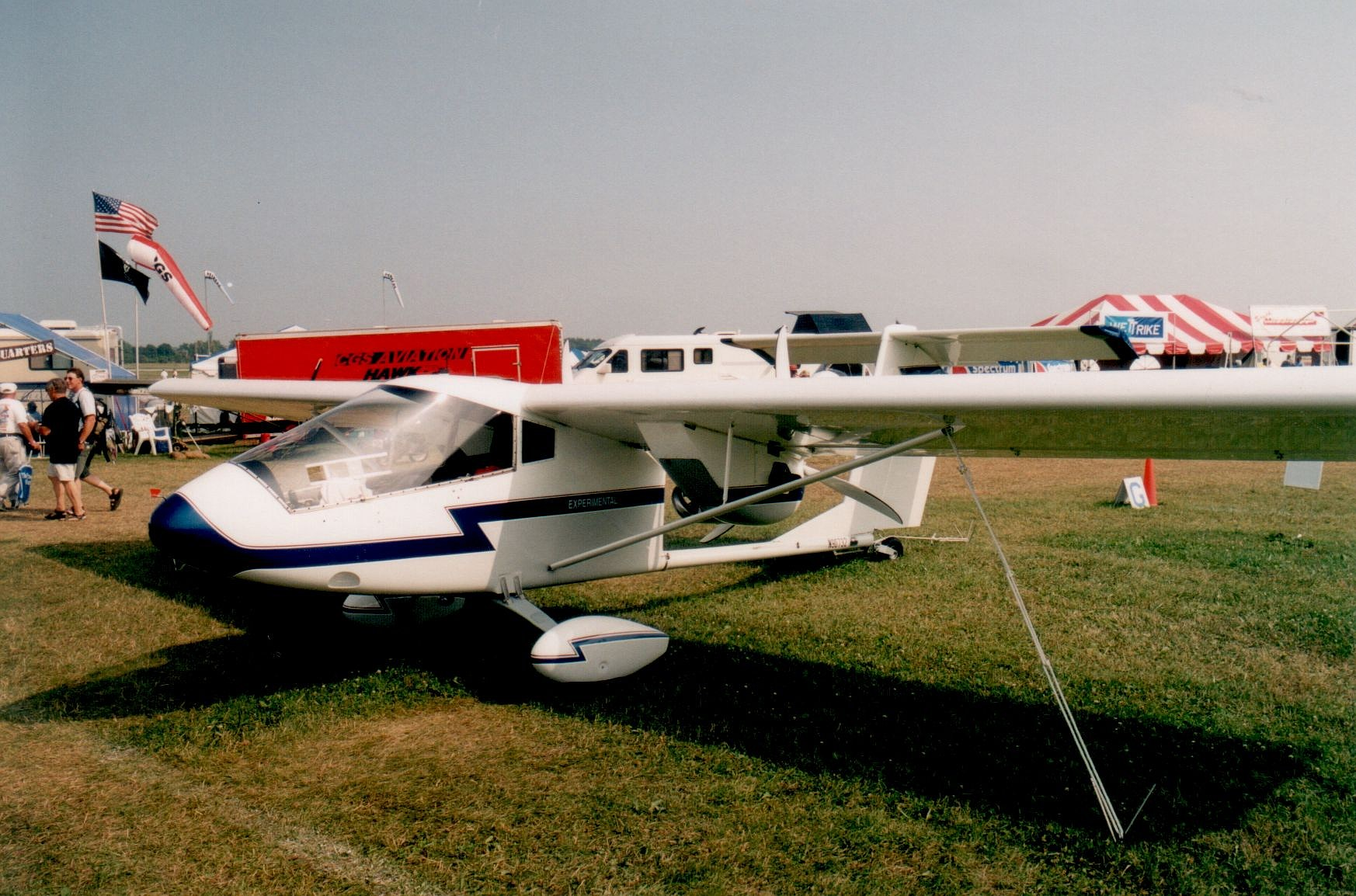
Aeroprakt A-26 Vulcan

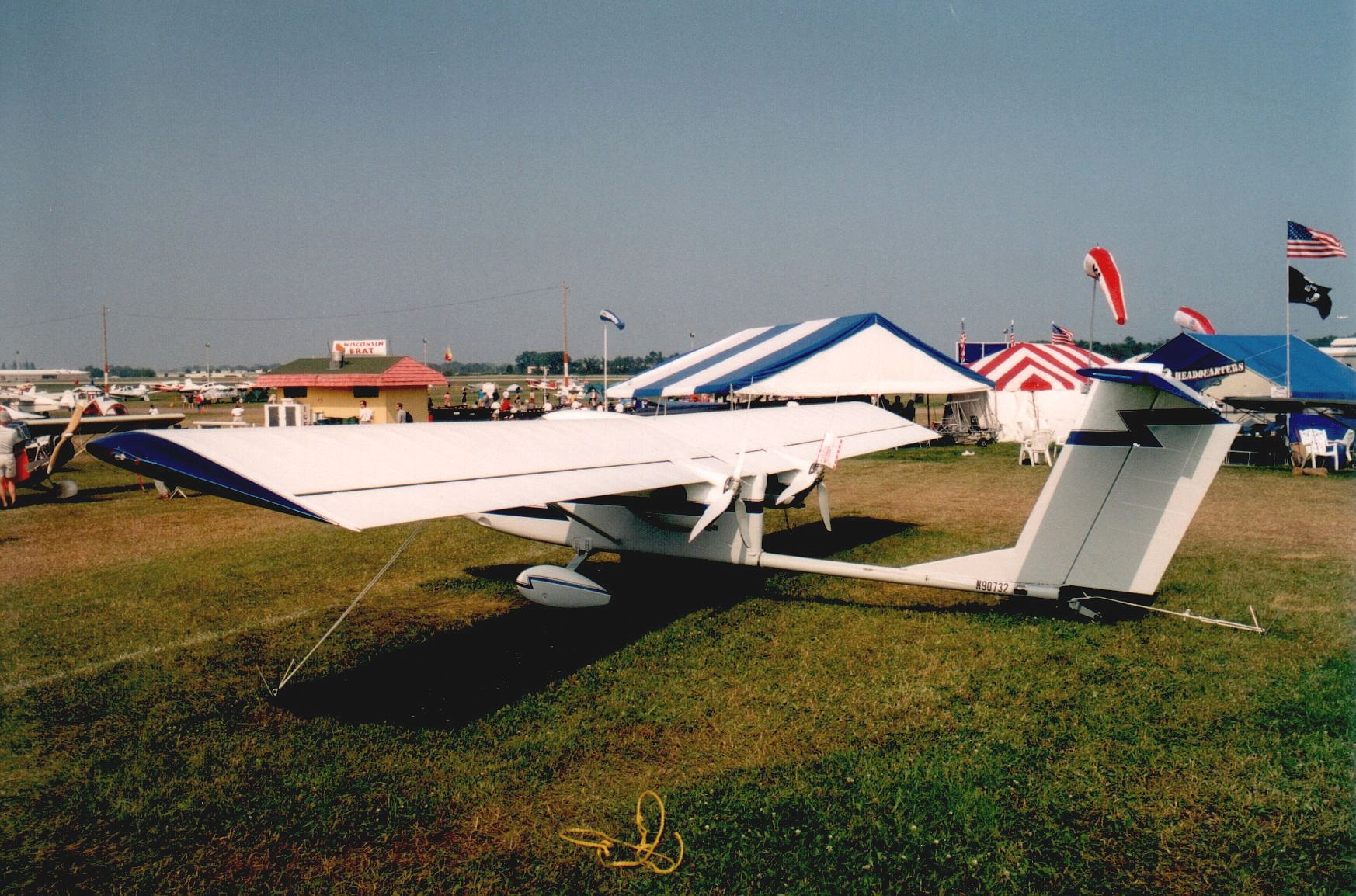
Aeroprakt A-26 Vulcan

The Aeroprakt A-26 Vulcan is a light twin engine aircraft developed from a modified Aeroprakt A-20 light single aircraft. Some models imported to the United States are registered as Spectrum Aircraft SA-26 Vulcan.

== Design and development ==
The A-26 has an extra 3° degree sweepback of the wings from its single engine counterpart, the A-20. The aircraft is powered by two Rotax 503 (eventually Rotax 582) engines in a pusher configuration.

== Operational history ==
An example of the A-26 was demonstrated at the 2000 Experimental Aircraft Association AirVenture airshow in Oshkosh, Wisconsin. Spectrum Aircraft imported versions for the American market.

== Variants ==
The Aeroprakt A-36 Vulcan is an updated factory built Rotax 912S powered twin.

== Specifications (variant specified) ==
Data from Aeroprakt

General characteristics

- Capacity: 2
- Length: 6.7 m (22 ft 0 in)
- Wingspan: 11.4 m (37 ft 5 in)
- Height: 1.9 m (6 ft 3 in)
- Wing area: 15.7 m^{2} (169 sq ft)
- Empty weight: 290 kg (639 lb)
- Gross weight: 520 kg (1,146 lb)
- Fuel capacity: 38 l
- Powerplant: 2 × Rotax 582 , 48 kW (65 hp) each

Performance

- Maximum speed: 180 km/h (110 mph, 97 kn)
- Cruise speed: 130 km/h (81 mph, 70 kn)
- Stall speed: 65 km/h (40 mph, 35 kn)
- Rate of climb: 10 m/s (2,000 ft/min) 2.5 m/s with one engine
