= Aeroprakt A-32 Vixxen =

Ukrainian aircraft

A-32 Vixxen
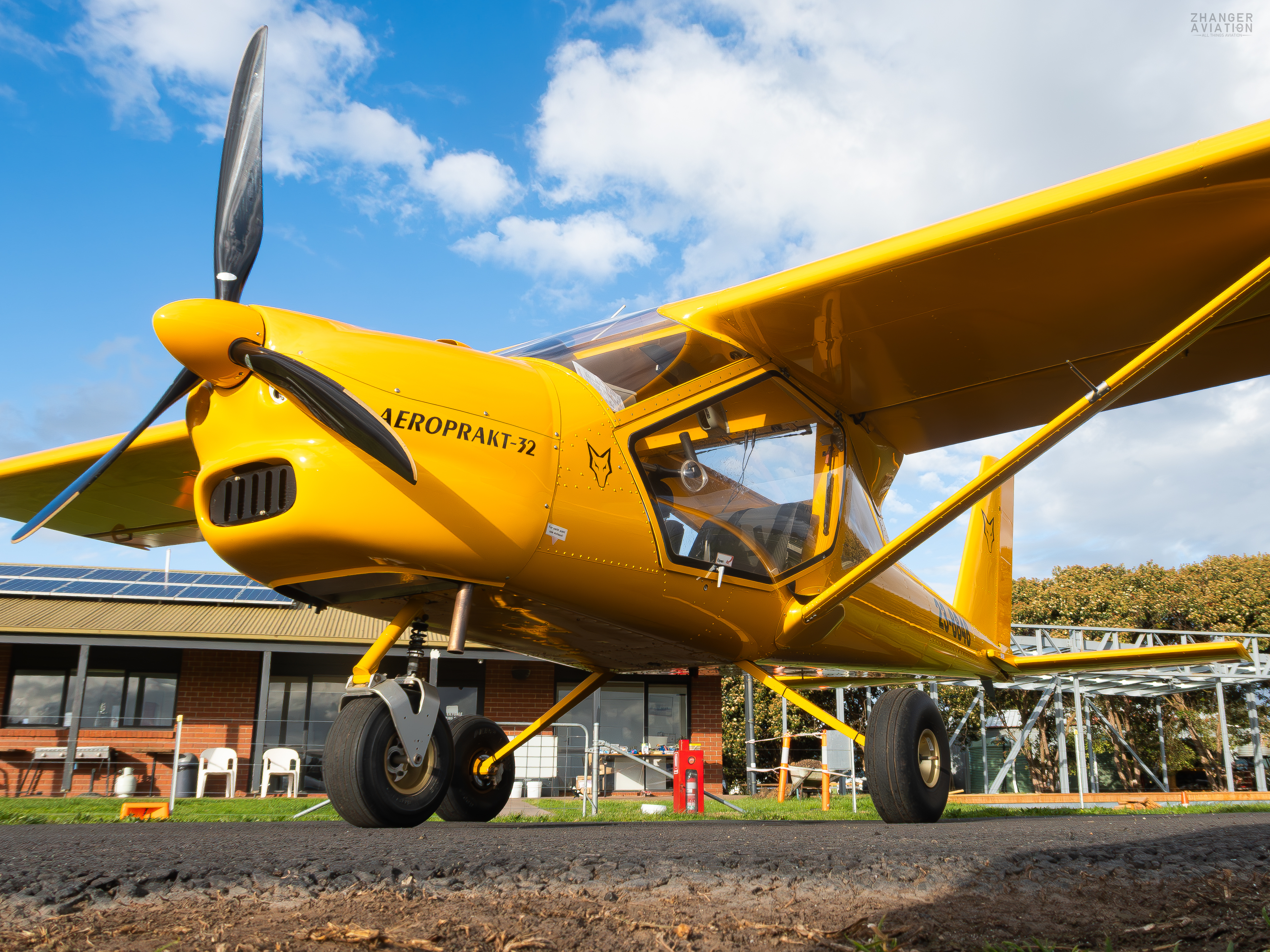

General information
- Type: Light-sport aircraft
- National origin: Ukraine
- Manufacturer: Aeroprakt
- Designer: Yuri Yakovlev
- Status: In production

History
- Manufactured: 2014 to present
- Introduction date: 2014
- First flight: 2014

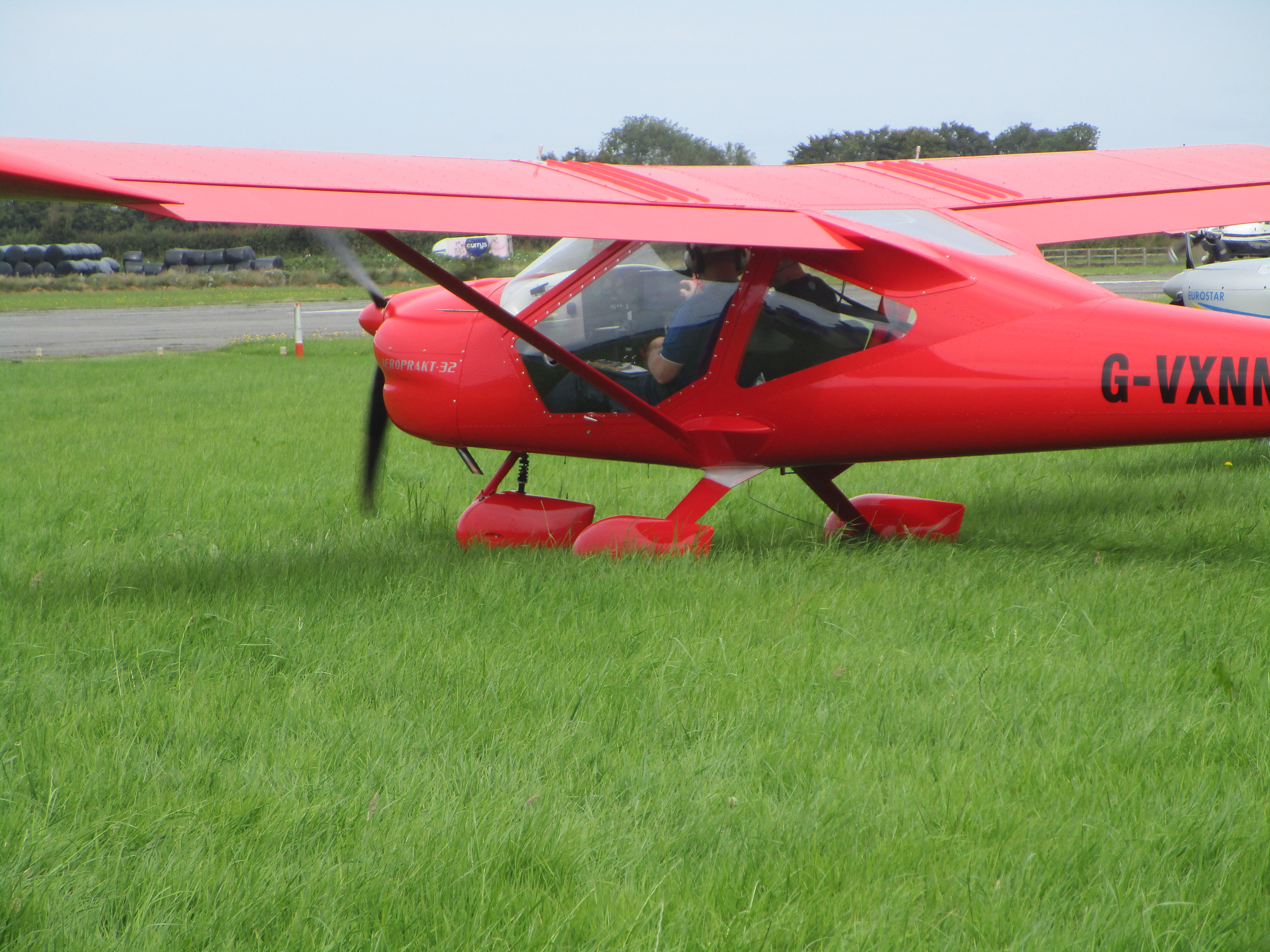
G-VXXN – Aeroprakt A-32 Vixxen at Dunkeswell Aerodrome

The Aeroprakt A-32 is a Ukrainian two-seat, high-wing, tricycle gear ultralight aircraft that was designed by Yuri Yakovlev and is manufactured by Aeroprakt. In Australia the A-32 is referred to as the Vixxen.

The A-32 is a development of the A-22 Foxbat; however unlike the earlier aircraft, which can be purchased in kit form or fully assembled, the A-32 Vixxen is supplied only as a kit in the UK, or ready-to-fly factory-built aircraft in 31 other countries.

== Design and development ==
The A-32 was developed from A-22 Foxbat during three years of research and development.

To increase cruise speed while employing the same 100 hp (75 kW) Rotax 912ULS engine as the A-22, the A-32 has a new flush wing-to-body fairing design and all flying horizontal stabilizer, as well as moulded baffling for improved engine airflow and cooling. Other changes include a wing that is 10 cm (3.9 in) shorter, shorter lift struts and better wing tank fairing. This results in a cruise speed that is 20 kn (37 km/h) faster than the A-22.

The prototype A-32 was completed in January 2014 and the first production aircraft was shown in April 2015. It was then transported to Australia, first flying at Moorabbin on 20 July 2015.

== Variants ==
Aeroprakt A-32L
An ultralight variant of the A-32 with a MTOW of 450 kg (or 472.5 kg with recovery parachute system) to comply with European regulations, although not UK legal. Central control Y-stick installed as default, twin control yokes offered as an option.

== Specifications (A-32 Vixxen) ==
Data from Foxbat AU

General characteristics

- Crew: one
- Capacity: one passenger
- Length: 6.27 m (20 ft 7 in)
- Wingspan: 9.45 m (31 ft 0 in)
- Height: 2.22 m (7 ft 3 in)
- Empty weight: 320 kg (705 lb)
- Max takeoff weight: 600 kg (1,323 lb)
- Fuel capacity: 95 L (25 US gal; 21 imp gal) usable in two tanks
- Powerplant: 1 × Rotax 912ULS 4-cylinder horizontally opposed air-cooled piston aircraft engine, 75 kW (100 hp)
- Propellers: 3-bladed KievProp 3-blade ground-adjustable prop with metal leading edges

Performance

- Cruise speed: 213 km/h (132 mph, 115 kn)
- Stall speed: 50 km/h (31 mph, 27 kn)
- Never exceed speed: 232 km/h (144 mph, 125 kn)
- Endurance: 4.5 hours
- g limits: +4/-2

Avionics

- VHF 760 dual watch radio
