= Aeroprakt A-36 Vulcan =

Ukrainian light aircraft

A-36 Vulcan
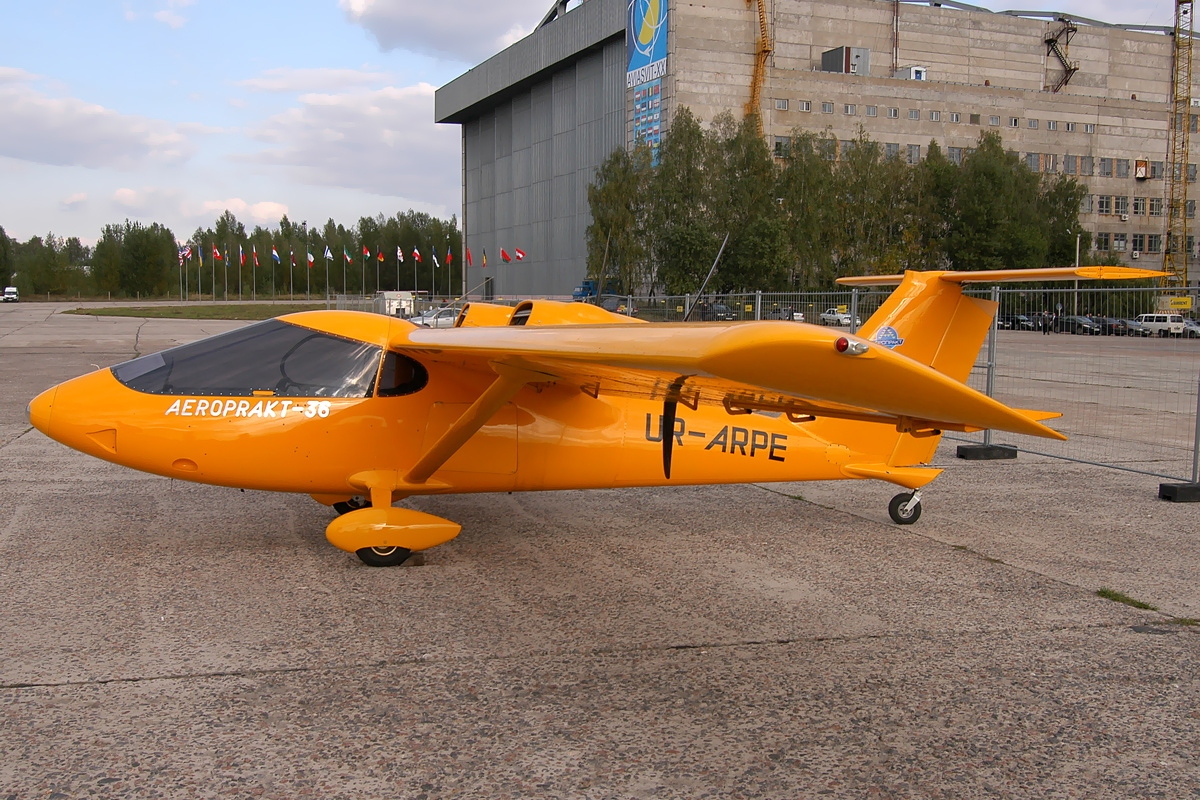

General information
- Type: Light aircraft
- National origin: Ukraine
- Manufacturer: Aeroprakt
- Status: In production (2011)

History
- Developed from: Aeroprakt A-26 Vulcan

The Aeroprakt A-36 Vulcan is a Ukrainian light aircraft, designed and produced by Aeroprakt of Kyiv. The aircraft is supplied as a complete ready-to-fly-aircraft.

== Design and development ==
The A-36 is a development of the Aeroprakt A-26 Vulcan. The design goals for the A-36 include operations over hostile terrain, the ability to take-off and land with only one engine running and the ability to operate from short runways. The resulting design features a strut-braced high-wing, T-tail, a two-seats in tandem configuration enclosed cockpit, fixed conventional landing gear with wheel pants and twin engines in pusher configuration.

The aircraft is of mixed construction, with the forward fuselage made from fibreglass and the tail cone from aluminium sheet. The wings and tail are aluminium, while the main landing gear legs, engine cowlings and fairings are fibreglass. Its 11.4 m (37.4 ft) span wing has an area of 15.7 m^{2} (169 sq ft) and mounts flaps. The standard engines used are the 100 hp (75 kW) Rotax 912S four-stroke powerplant.

The A-36 has an empty weight of 450 kg (990 lb) and a gross weight of 750 kg (1,650 lb), giving a useful load of 300 kg (660 lb).

== Operational history ==
By December 2012 one example had been registered in the United States with the Federal Aviation Administration. It had previously been publicly exhibited at the April 2009 Sun 'n Fun aviation gathering at Lakeland, Florida.

== Specifications (A-36 Vulcan) ==
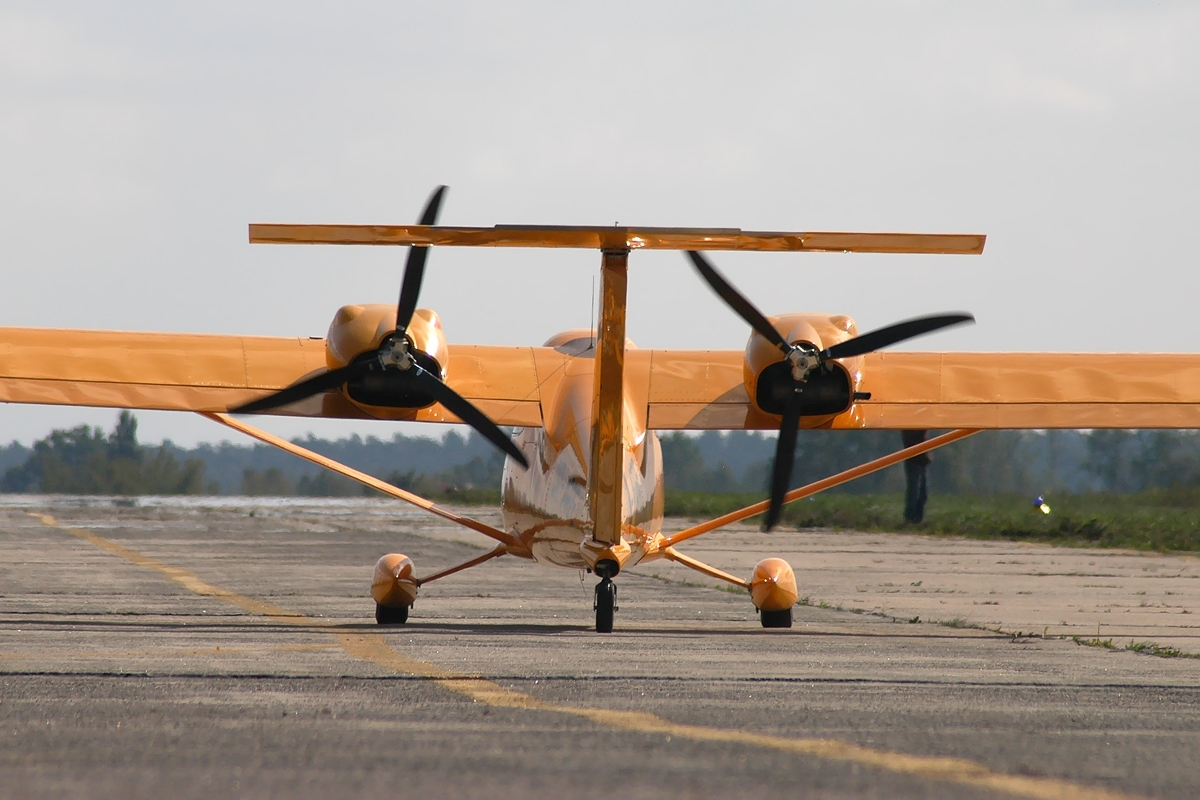
Aeroprakt A-36 Vulcan

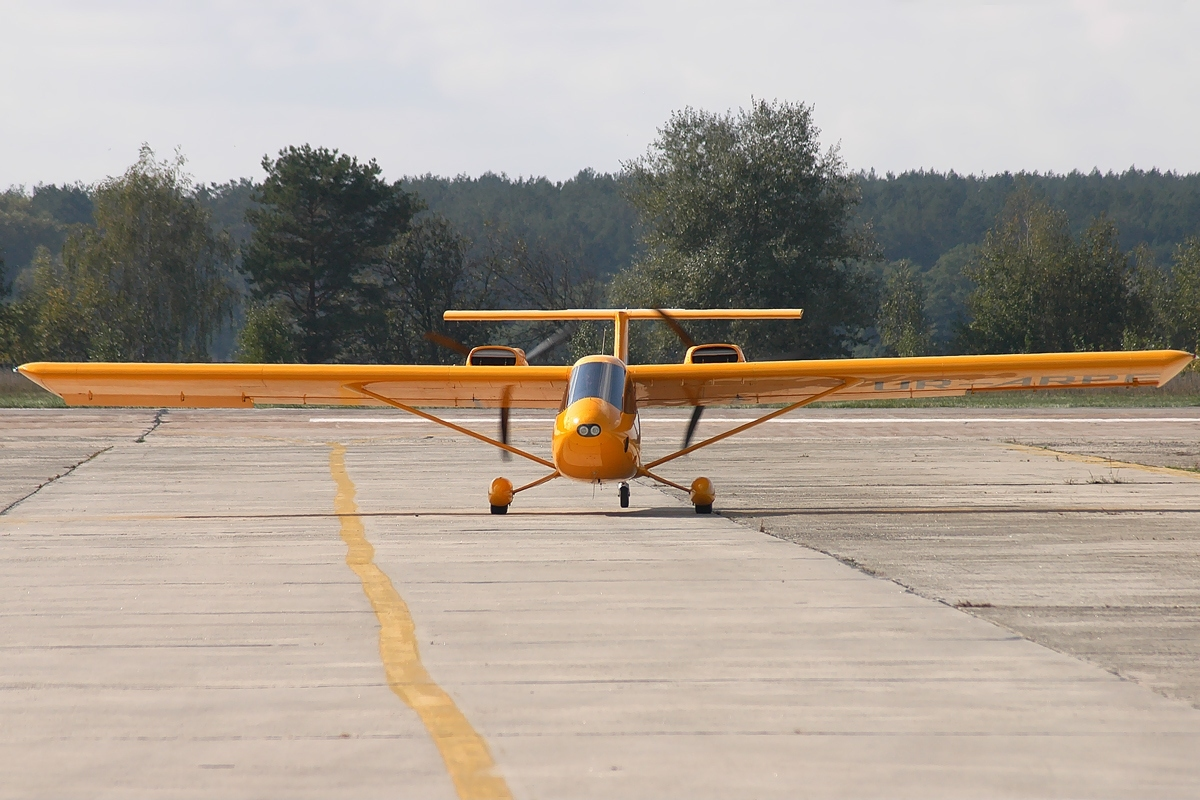
Aeroprakt A-36 Vulcan

Data from Bayerl

General characteristics

- Crew: one
- Capacity: one passenger
- Wingspan: 11.4 m (37 ft 5 in)
- Wing area: 15.7 m^{2} (169 sq ft)
- Empty weight: 450 kg (992 lb)
- Gross weight: 750 kg (1,653 lb)
- Fuel capacity: 120 litres (26 imp gal; 32 US gal)
- Powerplant: 2 × Rotax 912S four cylinder, liquid and air-cooled, four stroke aircraft engine, 75 kW (101 hp) each

Performance

- Maximum speed: 260 km/h (160 mph, 140 kn)
- Cruise speed: 220 km/h (140 mph, 120 kn)
- Stall speed: 70 km/h (43 mph, 38 kn)
- Rate of climb: 11 m/s (2,200 ft/min)
- Wing loading: 47.8 kg/m^{2} (9.8 lb/sq ft)
