= Aeroprakt A-28 Victor =

Ukrainian twin engine aircraft

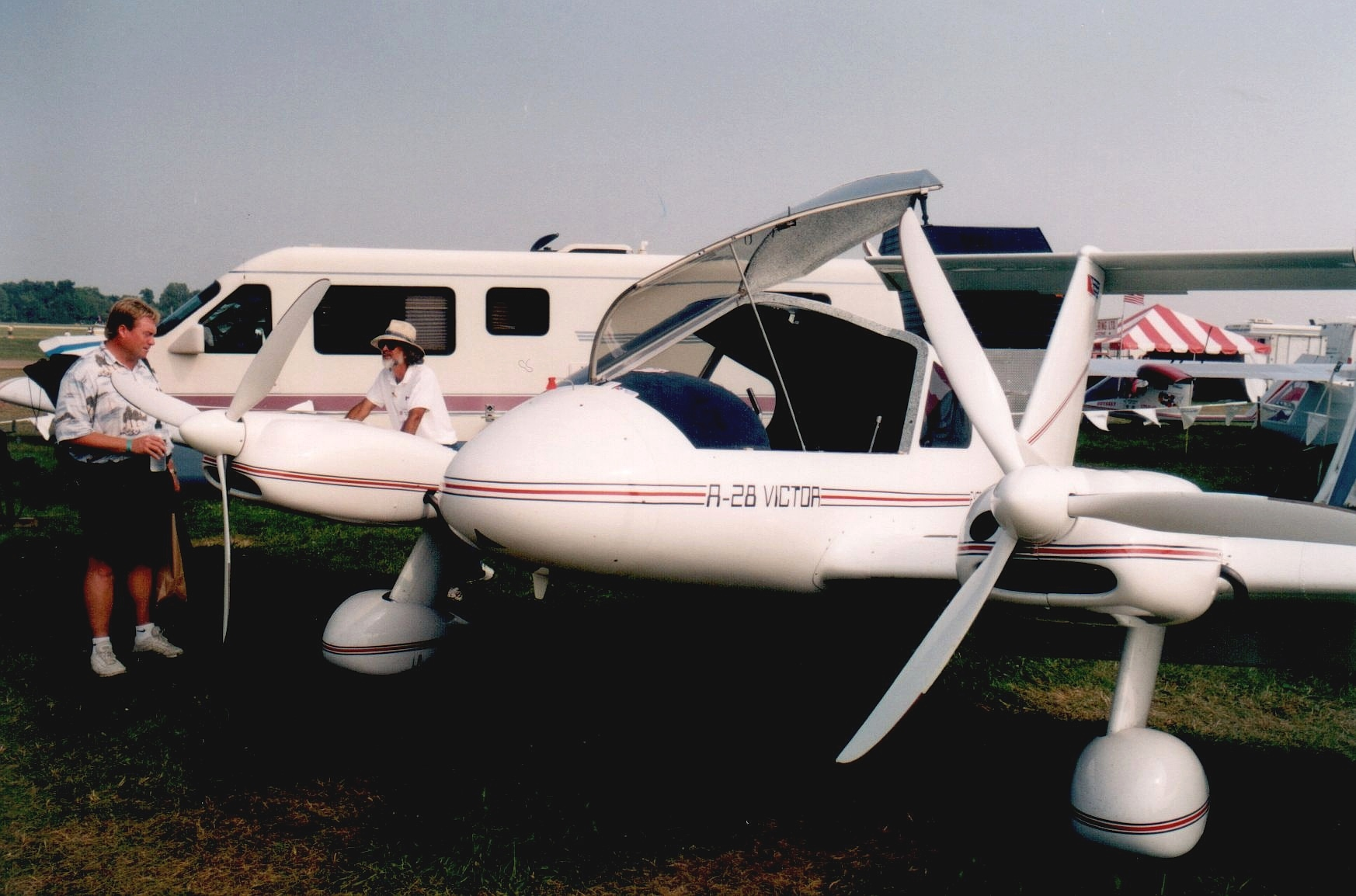

General information
- Type: Light aircraft
- National origin: Ukraine
- Manufacturer: Aeroprakt
- Status: In production (2011)
- Number built: at least three

The Aeroprakt A-28 Victor is a Ukrainian light aircraft, designed and produced by Aeroprakt of Kyiv. The aircraft is supplied as a complete ready-to-fly-aircraft.

== Design and development ==
The design goals for the A-28 included twin engines for safety over hazardous terrain, a payload of 300 kg (660 lb) with four seats, 10 hours endurance, as well as good short and rough field capabilities. The resulting design features a cantilever low-wing, a four-seat enclosed cabin accessed through a hinged windshield, a T-tail, fixed conventional landing gear and twin engines in tractor configuration.

The aircraft has mixed construction, with the forward fuselage made from fibreglass and the tail cone of aluminium sheet. The wings and tail are all-aluminium, while the control surfaces are aluminium frames covered in doped aircraft fabric. Its 12 m (39.4 ft) span wing employs a TsAGI P-IIIA-15 airfoil, has an area of 13.4 m^{2} (144 sq ft) and mounts flaps. The standard engines fitted are two 80 hp (60 kW) Rotax 912 or two 100 hp (75 kW) Rotax 912S powerplants. The conventional landing gear fits wheel pants and features a steerable tailwheel.

The A-28 has an empty weight of 530 kg (1,170 lb) and a gross weight of 1,100 kg (2,400 lb), giving a useful load of 570 kg (1,260 lb).

== Operational history ==
One example was registered in 2001 in the United States with the Federal Aviation Administration in the amateur-built category, but on 18 October 2004 it was deregistered and exported to Ukraine.

== Specifications (A-28 Victor) ==
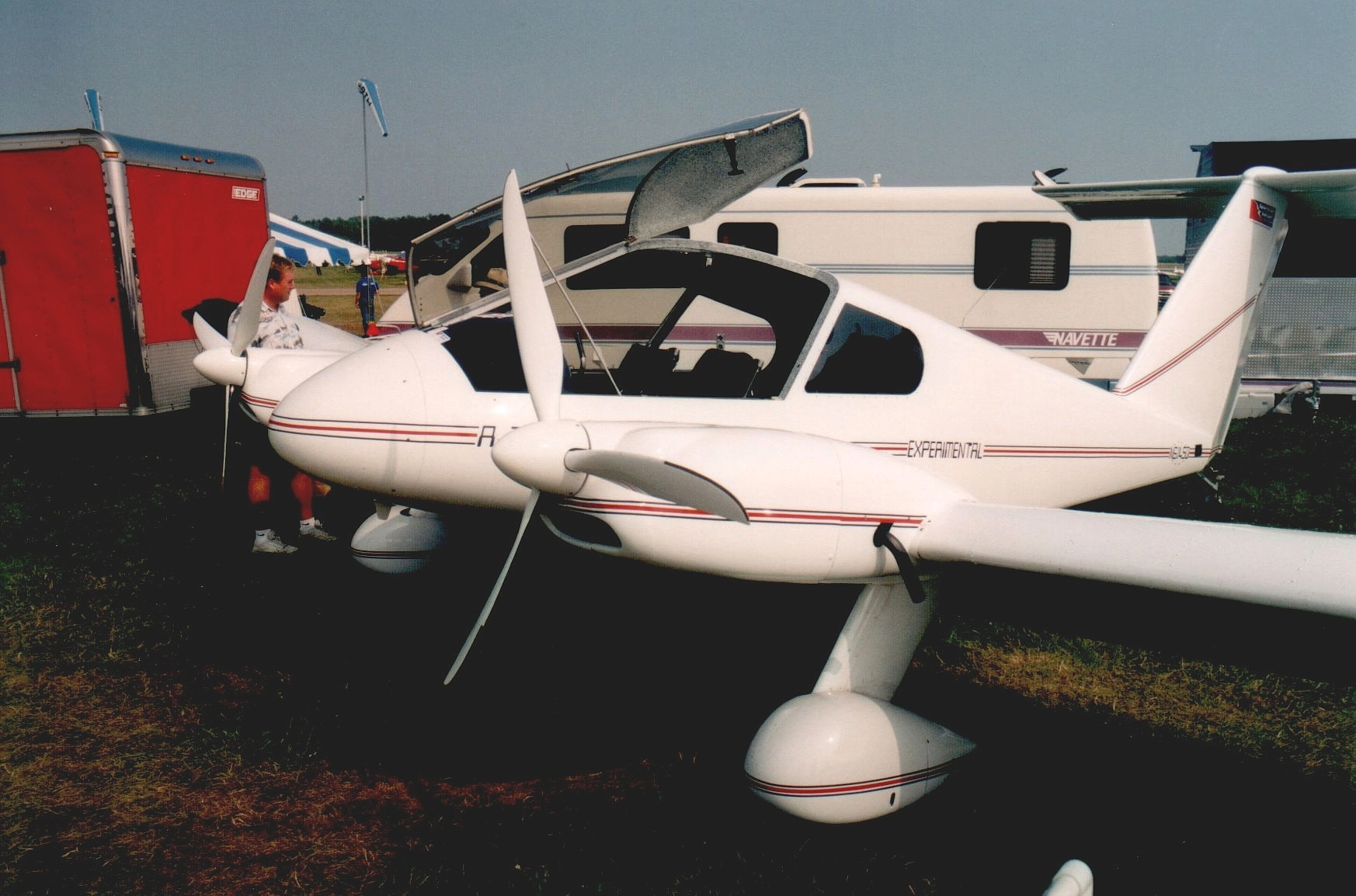
Aeroprakt A-28 Victor

Data from Bayerl

General characteristics

- Crew: one
- Capacity: three passengers
- Wingspan: 12 m (39 ft 4 in)
- Wing area: 13.4 m^{2} (144 sq ft)
- Airfoil: TsAGI P-IIIA-15
- Empty weight: 530 kg (1,168 lb)
- Gross weight: 1,100 kg (2,425 lb)
- Fuel capacity: 180 litres (40 imp gal; 48 US gal)
- Powerplant: 2 × Rotax 912 four cylinder, liquid and air-cooled, four stroke aircraft engine, 60 kW (80 hp) each
- Propellers: 3-bladed composite

Performance

- Maximum speed: 300 km/h (190 mph, 160 kn)
- Cruise speed: 250 km/h (160 mph, 130 kn)
- Stall speed: 90 km/h (56 mph, 49 kn)
- Rate of climb: 5 m/s (980 ft/min)
- Wing loading: 82.1 kg/m^{2} (16.8 lb/sq ft)
