= Aeroprakt =

Aircraft manufacturer in Ukraine

Aeroprakt Ltd.
- Company type: Privately held company
- Industry: Aerospace
- Founded: 1991
- Founder: Yuri Yakovlev
- Headquarters: Kyiv, Ukraine
- Key people: Oleg Litovchenko, Director; Yuri Yakovlev, Chief Designer
- Products: Light aircraft, homebuilt aircraft, ultralights
- Number of employees: 50 (2016)
- Website: aeroprakt.kiev.ua

Aeroprakt Ltd. (ТОВ «Аеропракт») is a Ukrainian aircraft manufacturer based in Kyiv and founded in 1991 by Yuri Yakovlev. The company specializes in the design and manufacture of light aircraft, homebuilt aircraft and ultralights in the form of kits for amateur construction and ready-to-fly aircraft.

The company is a "Товариство з обмеженою відповідальністю" a form of limited liability company. It has about 50 employees and operates from a 2,000 m^{2} (22,000 sq ft) facility.

== History ==
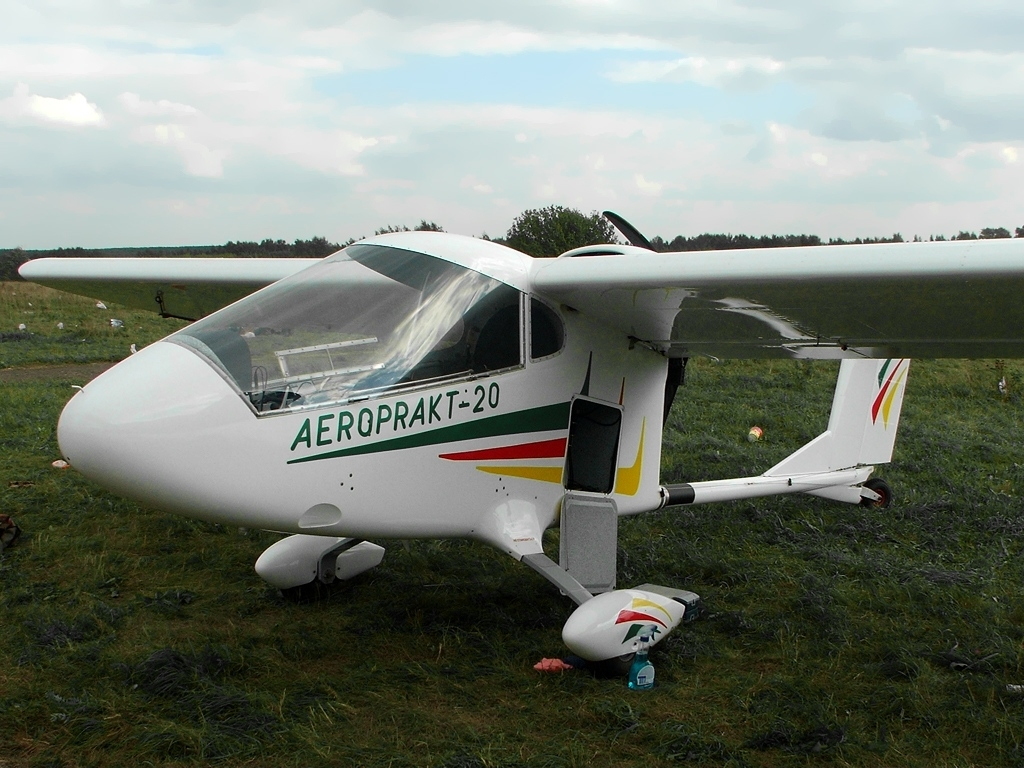
Aeroprakt A-20 Vista

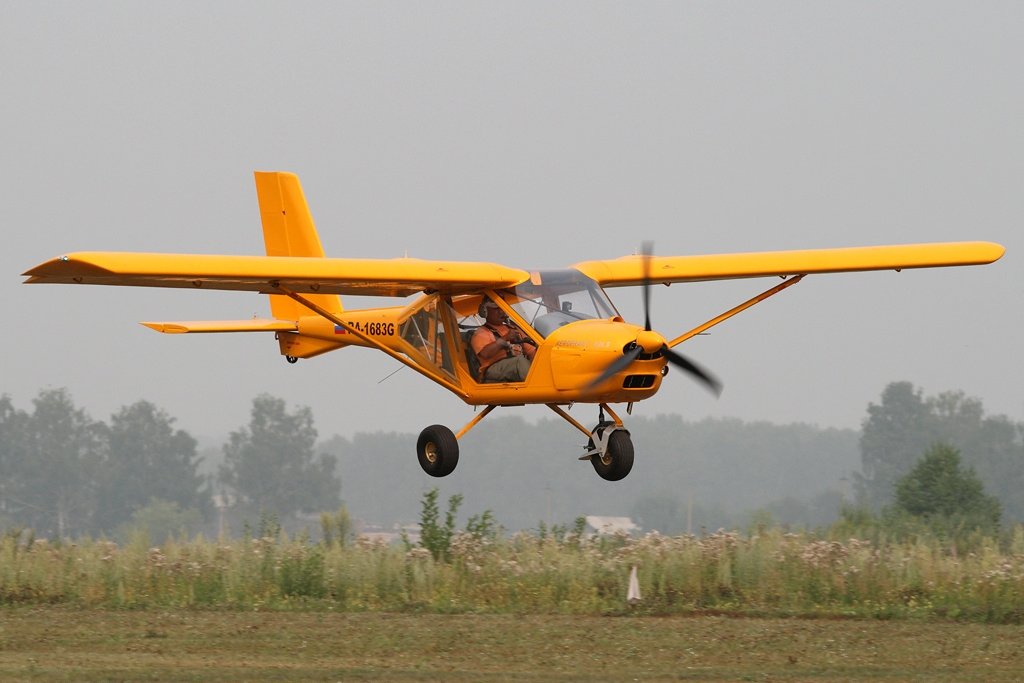
Aeroprakt A-22 Foxbat

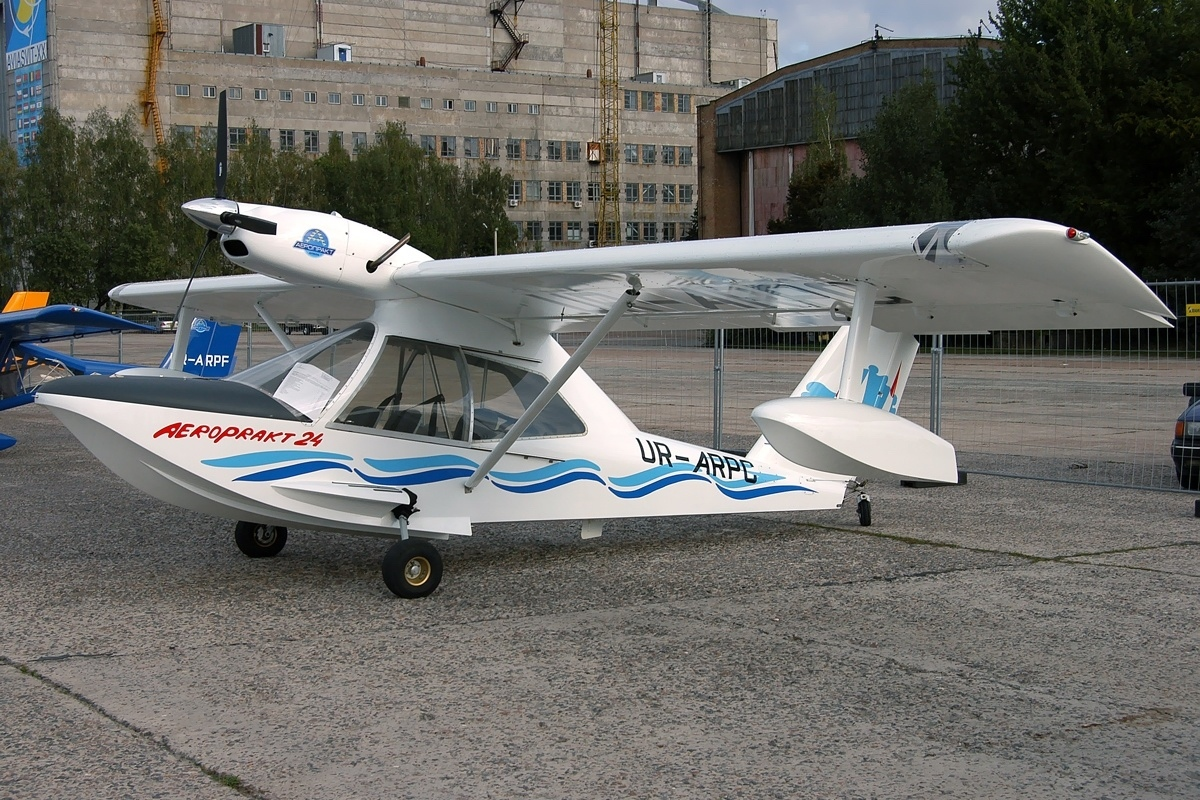
Aeroprakt A-24 Viking

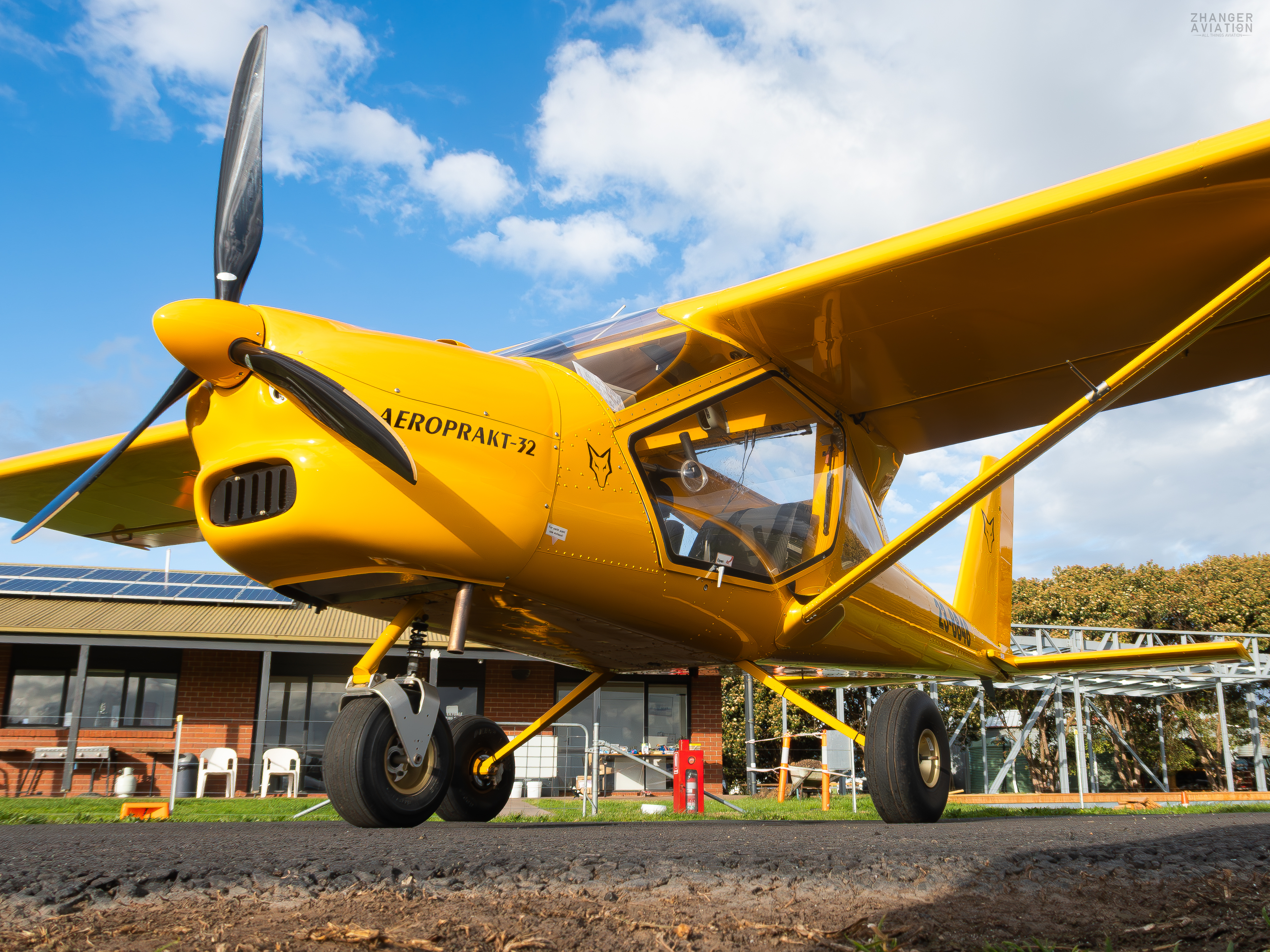
Aeroprakt A-32 Vixxen

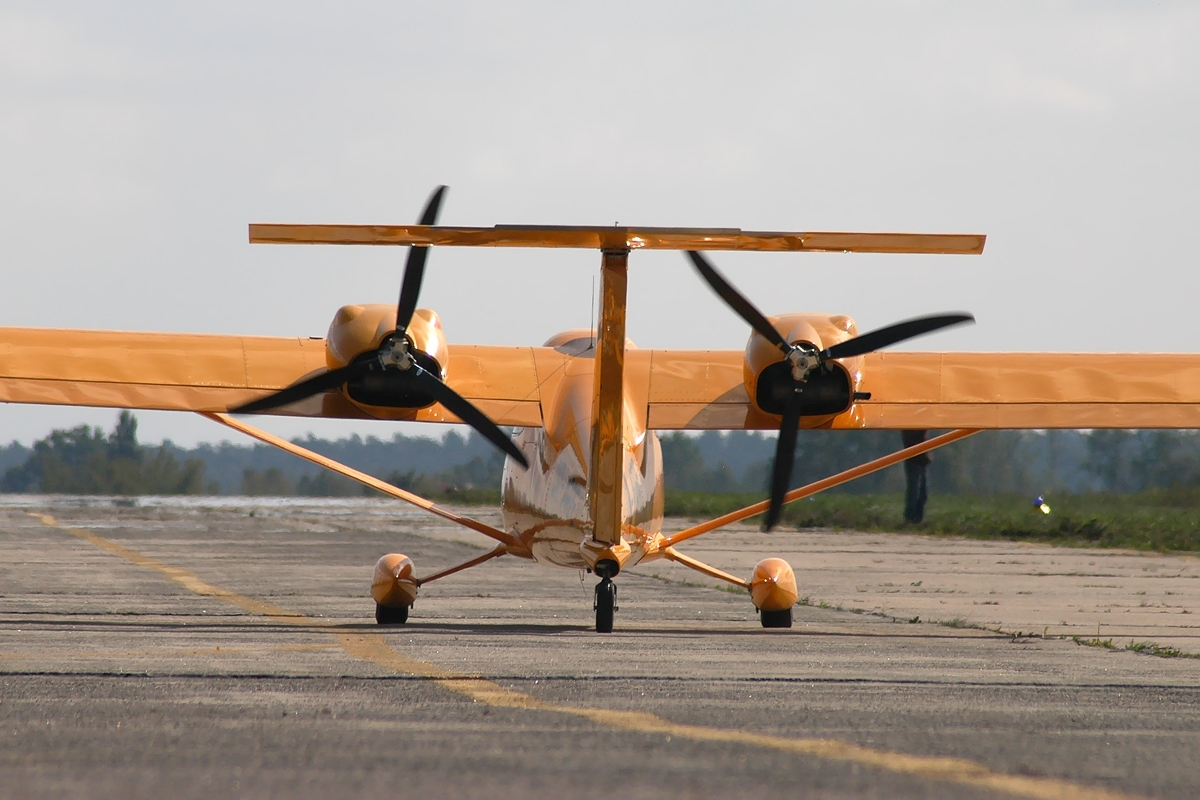
Aeroprakt A-36 Vulcan

The company was founded as an amateur aircraft design club by Yuri Yakovlev when he graduated from the Kuybyshev Aviation Institute and commenced work at Antonov in Kyiv in 1986. It was at the time of Ukrainian independence from the Soviet Union in 1991 that the company was formally formed.

The company was named after a similar-named the Kuybyshev Aviation Institute student's design bureau (SDB «Aeroprakt»), founded while Yakovlev was there at school.

In 1981, Yakovlev, being a student of 3rd course at Kuybyshev Aviation Institute, started research on Rutan Quickie using as initial data a single publication in Finnish aviation magazine. Till 1984 he, together with few other members of SDB «Aeroprakt», designed and built an experimental aircraft Aeroprakt-8 (Aeroprakt A-8), that was a reverse engineered and modified copy of the Quickie.

The next aircraft of the SDB «Aeroprakt» was Aeroprakt T-8, a simple two-seat ultralight trainer. The prototype was constructed in 1987, using photos of French ULM (ultralight monoplane) «Baroudeur», designed by André Confesson, which was photographed in details at Paris Air Show. Aeroprakt T-8 first shown in the Soviet Union in 1989, but did not enter series production, despite winning awards.

In 1991, Yakovlev together with Oleg Litovchenko founded Ukrainian company «Aeroprakt» (formally «Aeroprakt-Kyiv», while in Russia «Aeroprakt-Samara» has been founded by members of Kuybyshev Aviation Institute student's design bureau).

The first true production aircraft was the Aeroprakt A-20 Vista known locally as the Chervonets, the first prototype of which was finished in August 1991. As a result of the design and the political situation at the time, the club became the Kyiv division of Lada-Mononor, a joint Soviet-Finnish venture that was headquartered in Tolyatti, Russia. Yuri Yakovlev was named the Chief Designer and Oleg Litovchenko became its director. After the collapse of the Soviet Union in 1991 the company became an independent entity and the A-20 entered production, with the first production aircraft delivered in July, 1993.

November 1996 saw the introduction of the A-22 Foxbat, known locally as the Sharik (English: Balloon) and the twin-engined A-26 Vulcan as well.

The company has continued to develop new aircraft based on the A-20 concept, including the A-28 Victor and the A-36 Vulcan. In 2014 the A-32 Vixxen, a development of the A-22, was introduced.

== Aircraft ==
Summary of aircraft built by Aeroprakt. A-6, A-8, and all the odd numbered are built Kuybyshev, USSR and Samara, Russia; while all of the rest (most even numbered) built in Kyiv, Ukraine:

=== Aircraft by SDB Aeroprakt, now Aeroprakt-Samara (Kuybyshev, USSR, now Samara, Russia) ===
- Aeroprakt A-6 White
- Aeroprakt A-8
- Aeroprakt A-11M Hamlet
- Aeroprakt A-15
- Aeroprakt A-19
- Aeroprakt A-21 Solo
- Aeroprakt A-23 Dragon
- Aeroprakt A-25 Breeze
- Aeroprakt A-27
- Aeroprakt A-33 Dragon
- Aeroprakt A-37
- Aeroprakt A-41

=== Aircraft by Aeroprakt Ltd. (Kyiv, Ukraine, formerly Kyiv SDB) ===
- Aeroprakt T-8
- Aeroprakt A-20 Vista
- Aeroprakt A-22 Foxbat
- Aeroprakt A-24 Viking
- Aeroprakt A-26 Vulcan
- Aeroprakt A-28 Victor
- Aeroprakt A-30 Vista Speedster
- Aeroprakt A-32 Vixxen
- Aeroprakt A-36 Super Vulcan
