= Aeroprakt A-20 Vista =

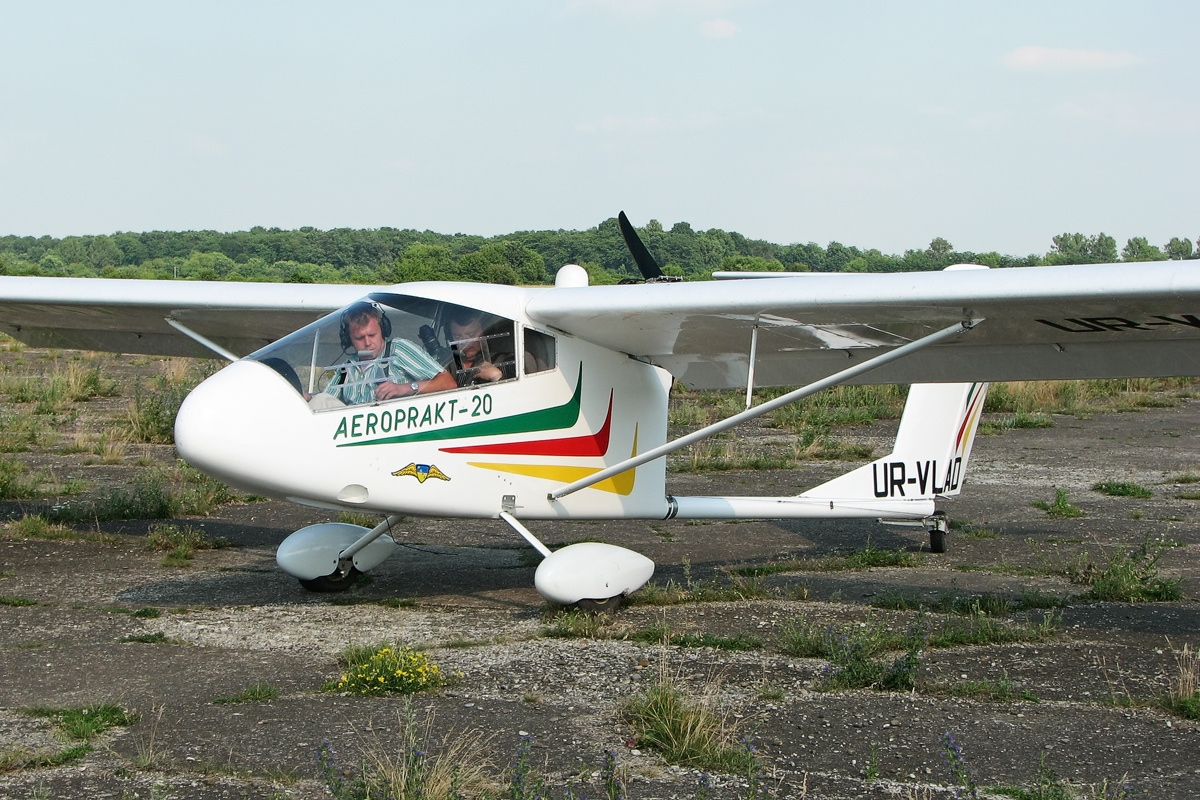

General information
- Type: Kit aircraft
- National origin: Ukraine
- Manufacturer: Aeroprakt
- Status: In production
- Number built: About 70 as of 2022

History
- Introduction date: 1993
- First flight: 1991
- Variant: Aeroprakt A-26 Vulcan

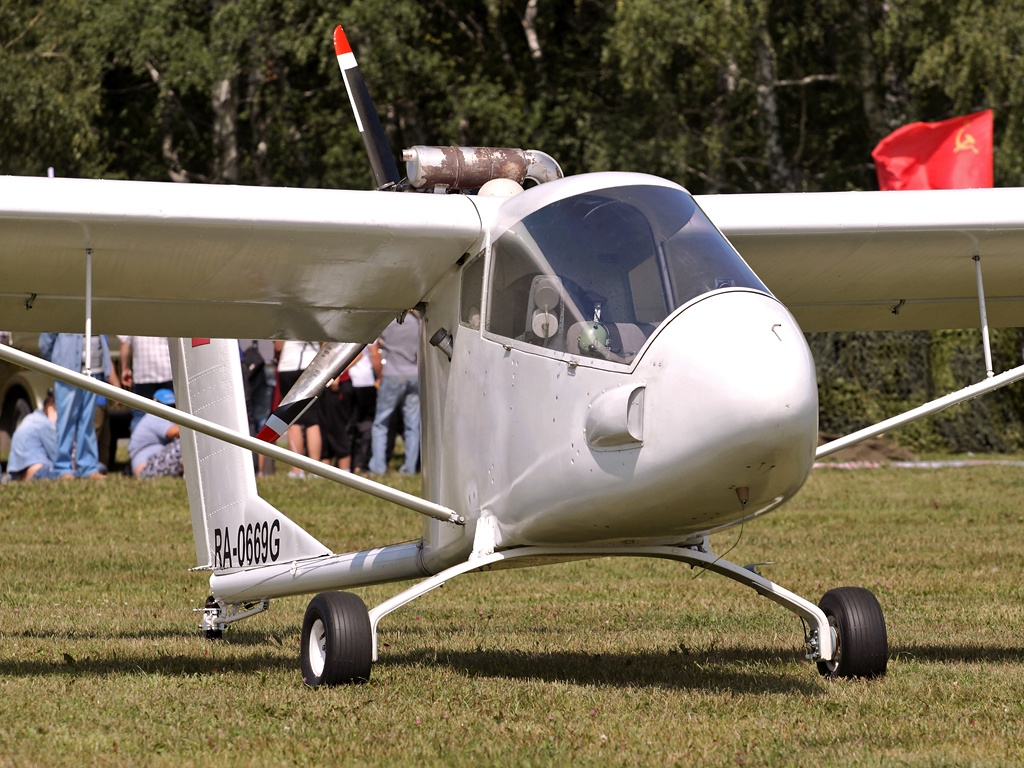
Aeroprakt A-20 Vista

The Aeroprakt A-20 Vista is a family of Ukrainian tandem two-seat high-wing, strut-braced, pusher configuration conventional landing gear, ultralight aircraft, produced by Aeroprakt. The A-20 was introduced into the North American market at AirVenture 1999.

== Design and development ==
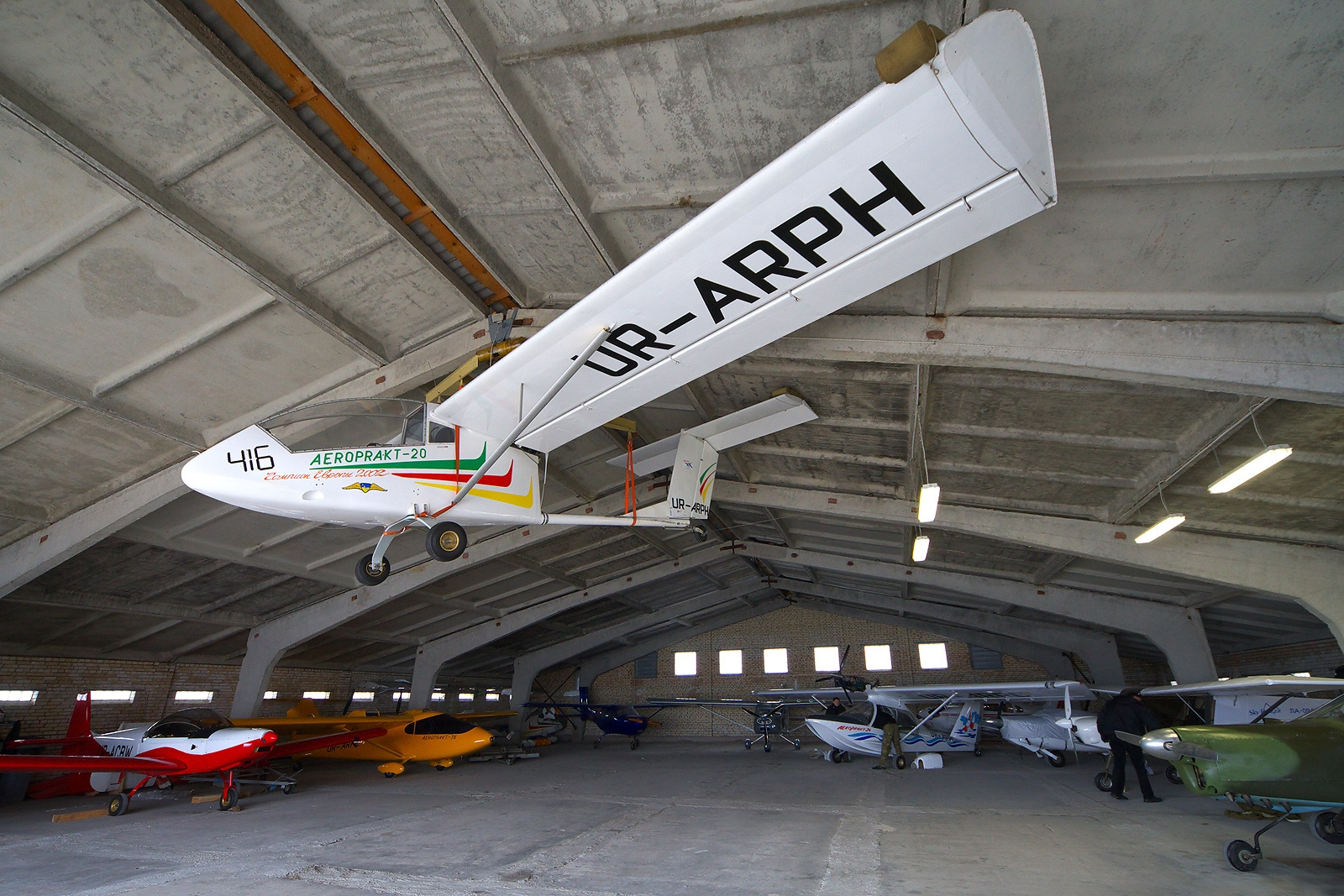
A-20 on a hangar crane

Design of the A-20 began in 1990, with the first prototype making its maiden flight on 5 August 1991, with the first production aircraft flying on 15 August 1993. The A-20 is constructed with a fiberglass forward fuselage and cockpit with aluminium wings and tail surfaces covered in doped aircraft fabric. The wing is fitted with half-span ailerons and flaps. The flaps are quite effective and lower the landing speed to 30 mph (48 km/h). Flaperons are available on some models. The conventional landing gear has steel sprung main gear legs.

The A-20 was originally designed for the 50 hp (37 kW) Rotax 503 two-stroke aircraft engine. The low drag airframe produces acceptable performance on this low power output. Optional engines include the 64 hp (48 kW) Rotax 582 and 100 hp (75 kW) Rotax 912ULS

== Operational history ==
An A-20 won the European Microlight Championship in 2002.

== Variants ==
A-20 Vista
Initial version with a 50 hp (37 kW) Rotax 503 engine.
A-20 Vista STOL
STOL version with a 64 hp (48 kW) Rotax 582 engine and standard slotted flaperons.
A-20 Vista SS
Higher cruise speed version with a reduced span 33.4 ft (10.2 m) wing and a 64 hp (48 kW) Rotax 582 engine.
A-20 Cruiser
Higher cruise speed version with a reduced span 33.4 ft (10.2 m) wing and a 100 hp (75 kW) Rotax 912ULS engine.
A-20 Cruiser-S
Higher cruise speed version with a reduced span 31.0 ft (9.4 m) wing, a 100 hp (75 kW) Rotax 912ULS engine and standard slotted flaperons.
A-26 Vulcan
A highly modified twin engine pusher.
A-30 Vista Speedster
A high performance derivative of the A-20.

== Specifications (A-20) ==
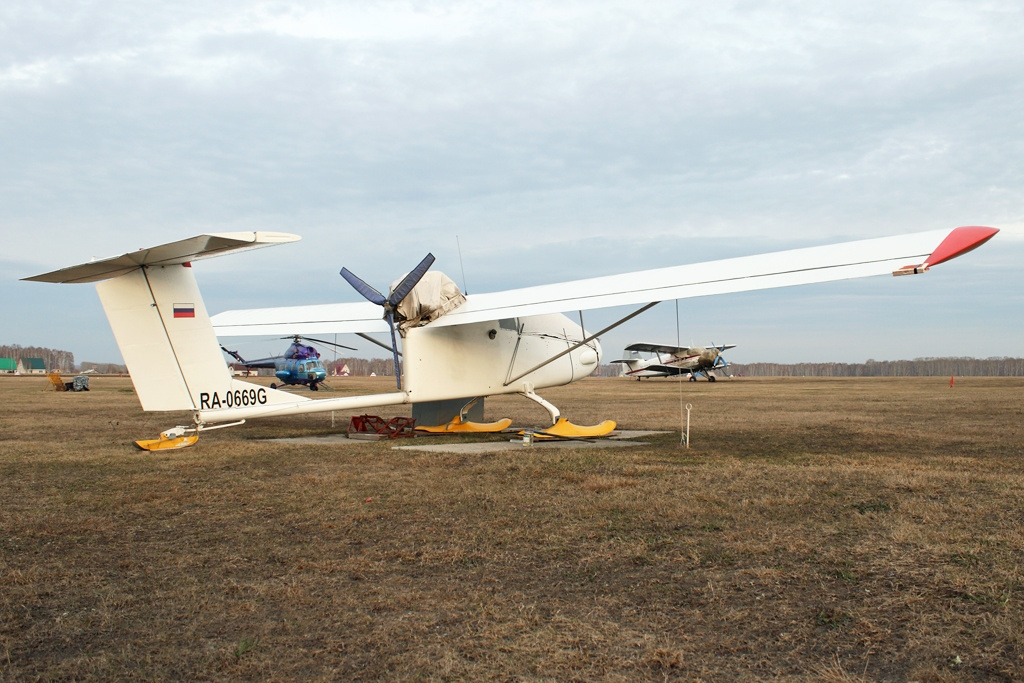
A-20 on skis

Data from Cliche and Lednicer

General characteristics

- Crew: one
- Capacity: one passenger in tandem seating
- Length: 22 ft 0 in (6.71 m)
- Wingspan: 38 ft 0 in (11.58 m)
- Height: 6 ft 0 in (1.83 m)
- Wing area: 172 sq ft (16.0 m^{2})
- Airfoil: TsAGI P-IIIA-15
- Empty weight: 484 lb (220 kg)
- Gross weight: 990 lb (449 kg)
- Fuel capacity: 9.5 US Gallons (36 litres)
- Powerplant: 1 × Rotax 503 , 50 hp (37 kW)

Performance

- Maximum speed: 93 mph (150 km/h, 81 kn)
- Cruise speed: 70 mph (110 km/h, 61 kn)
- Stall speed: 30 mph (48 km/h, 26 kn)
- g limits: +4/-2
- Rate of climb: 990 ft/min (5.0 m/s)
- Rate of sink: 356 ft/min (1.81 m/s)
