= Aeroprakt A-24 Viking =

A-24 Viking
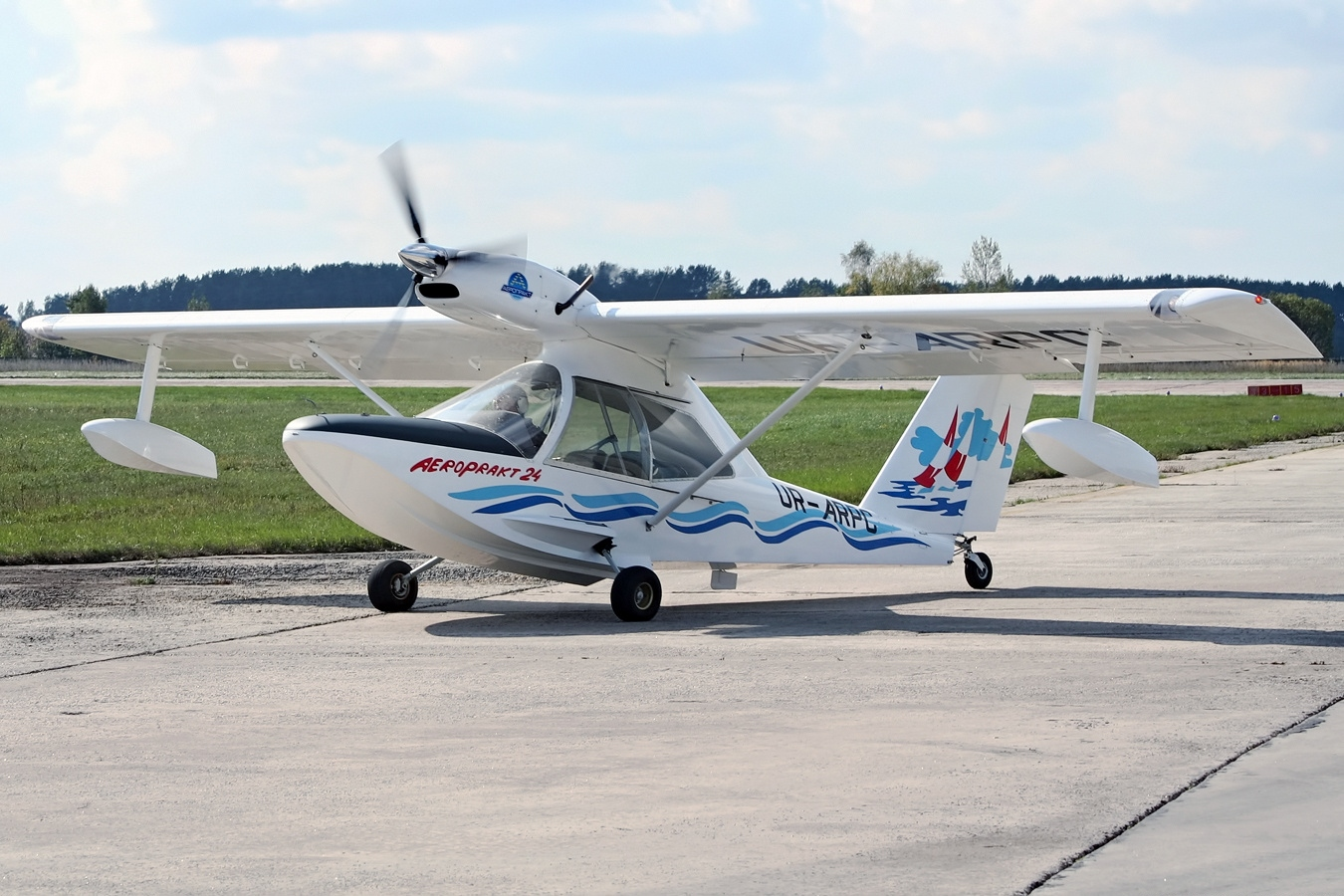

General information
- Type: Three-seat amphibious aircraft
- National origin: Ukraine
- Manufacturer: Aeroprakt

The Aeroprakt A-24 Viking is a Ukrainian three-seat light-sport amphibian designed for home building and marketed in kit form by Aeroprakt.

== Design and development ==
The Viking is a strut-braced high-wing monoplane amphibian. A Rotax 912ULS piston engine driving a tractor propeller is mounted on the leading edge of the wing above the cabin. The enclosed cabin has side-by-side seating with an additional single seat behind, the rear seat can be removed to fit luggage. It has a retractable landing gear with the main wheels moving above the water line on the fuselage side rather than retracting into the fuselage.

The design uses the same airfoil as the Antonov An-2 biplane, a TsAGI R-11 (14%).

No regular production was ongoing in 2015 and the aircraft was at that time only produced on request.

== Specifications ==
Data from

General characteristics

- Crew: 1
- Capacity: 2 passengers
- Length: 7.78 m (23 ft 11 in)
- Wingspan: 11 m (36 ft 3 in)
- Height: 3.21 m (10 ft 6.5 in)
- Wing area: 15 m^{2} (161.2 sq ft)
- Empty weight: 440 kg (969 lb)
- Gross weight: 750 kg (1,652 lb)
- Powerplant: 1 × Rotax 912ULS , 75 kW (100 hp)

Performance

- Maximum speed: 165 km/h (102 mph, 89 kn)
- Stall speed: 70 km/h (43 mph, 37 kn)
- Range: 800 km (432 mi, 375 nmi)
- Endurance: 4 hours 30 minutes
- Rate of climb: 4.0 m/s (800 ft/min)

== See also ==
Related lists

- List of flying boats and floatplanes
