= Aeroprakt A-22 Foxbat =

Ukrainian two-seat, high-wing, tricycle landing gear light sport aircraft

A-22 Foxbat
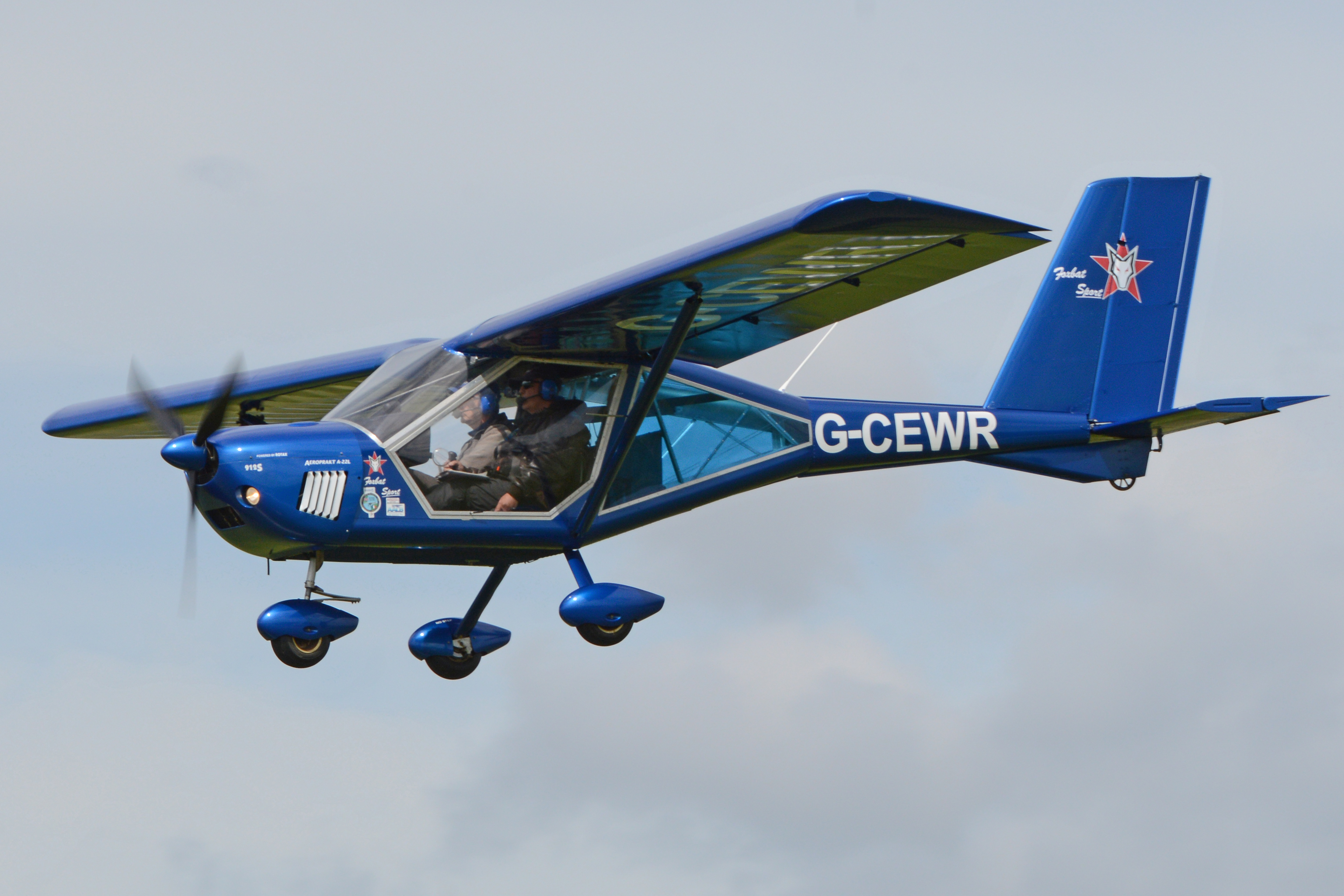

General information
- Type: Sports Light Aircraft
- National origin: Ukraine
- Manufacturer: Aeroprakt
- Designer: Yuri Yakovlev
- Status: In production
- Number built: 1,600

History
- Manufactured: 2000–present
- Introduction date: 1999
- First flight: 21 October 1996
- Variant: Aeroprakt A-32 Vixxen

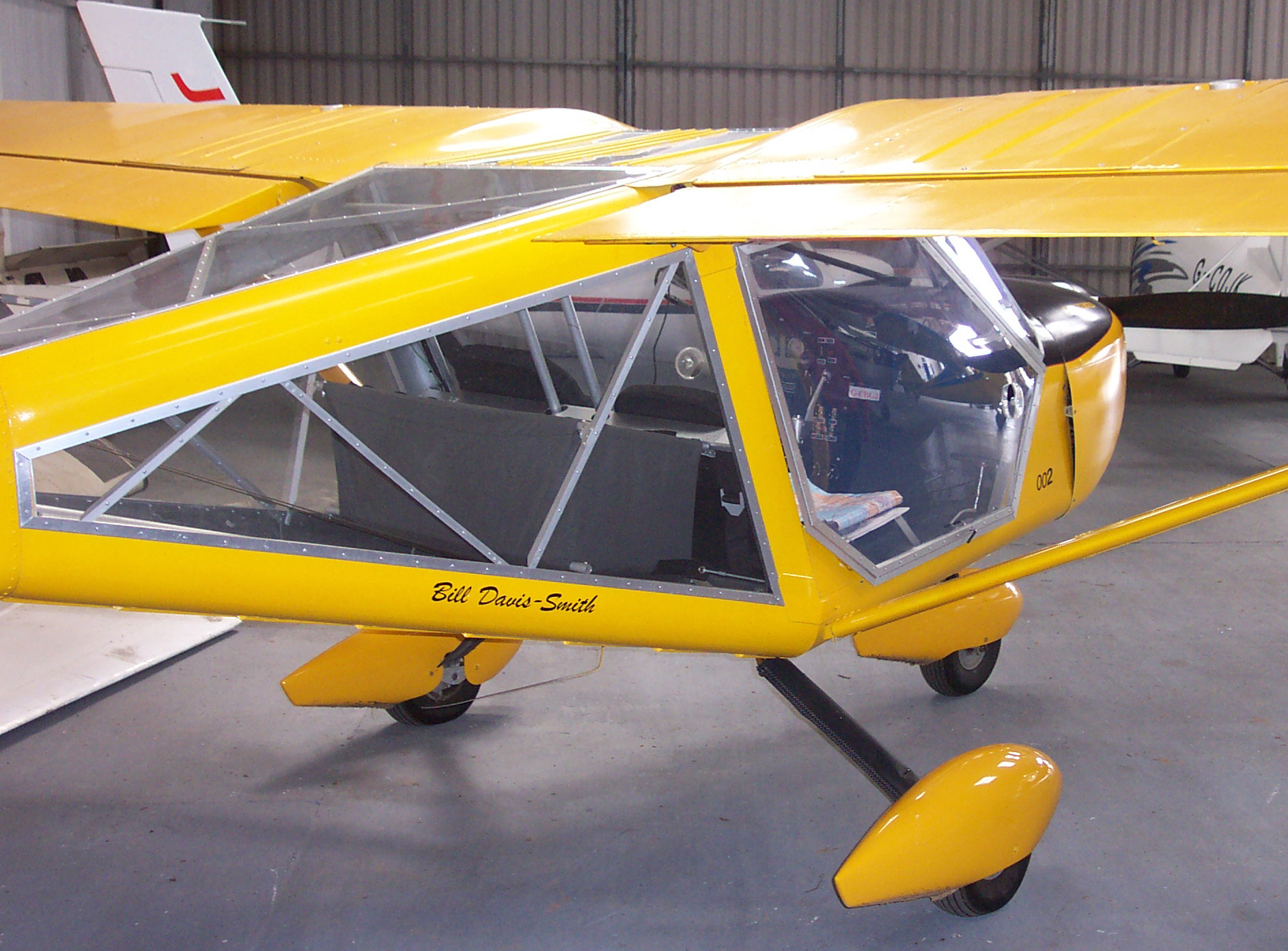
The A-22 Foxbat, showing its unique window arrangement

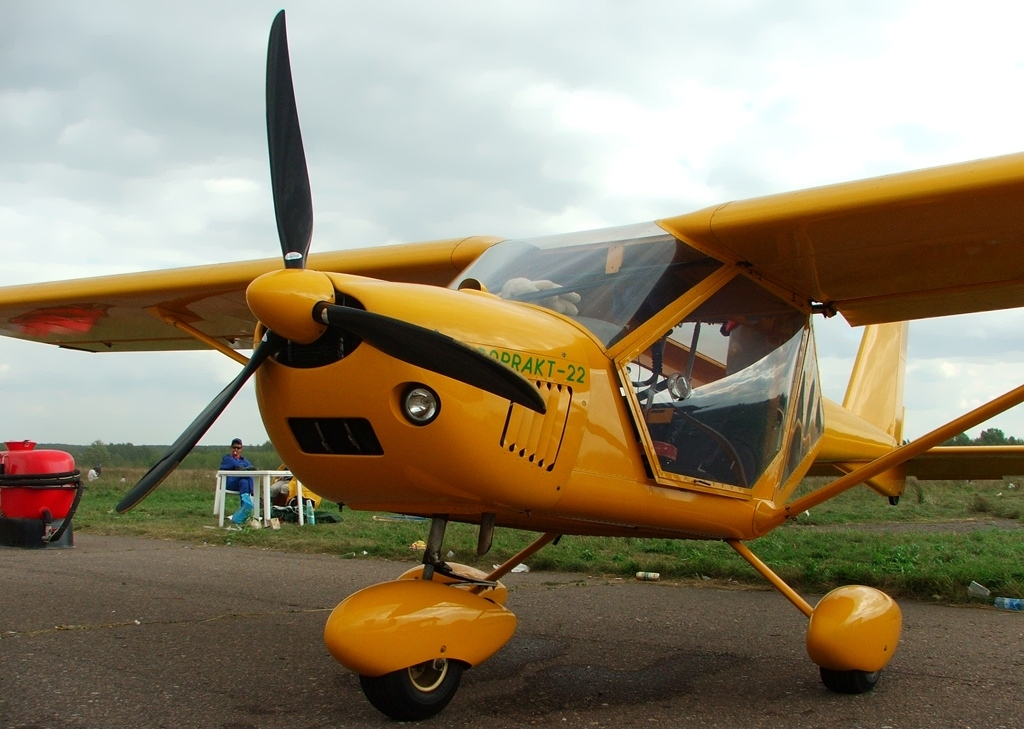
A-22 Foxbat

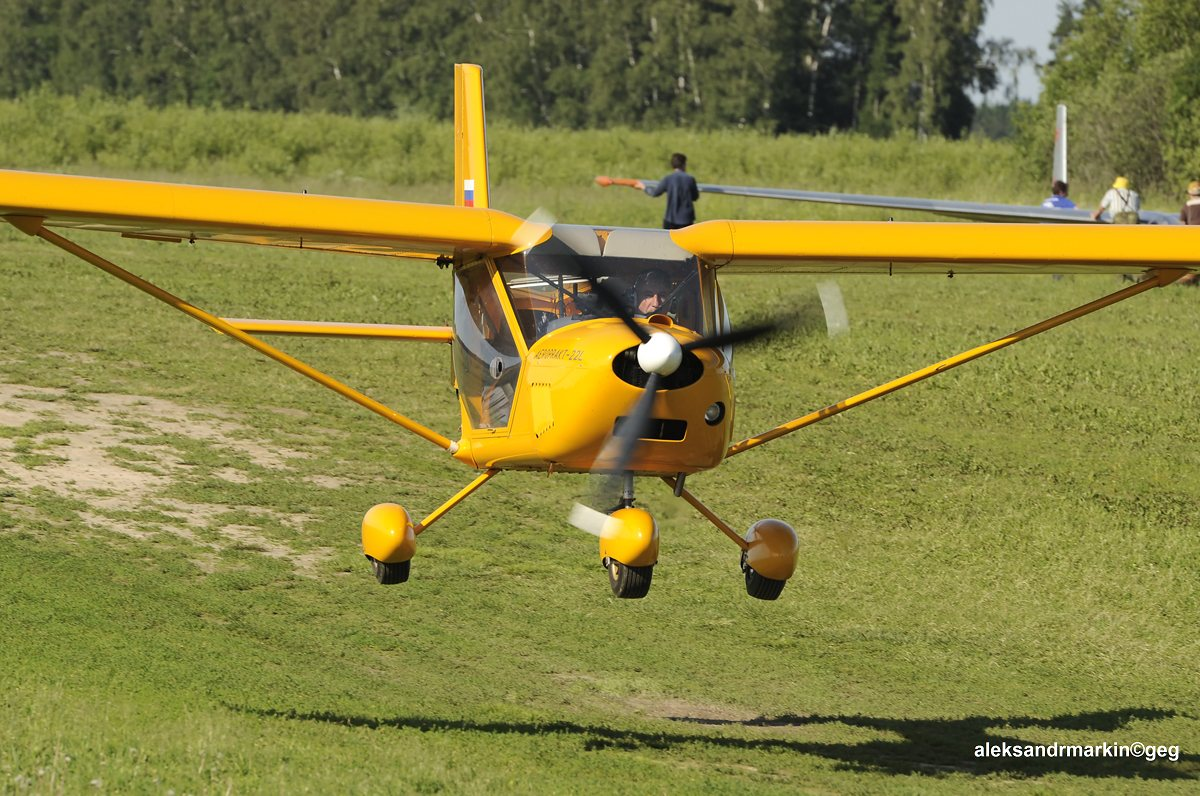
A-22 Foxbat

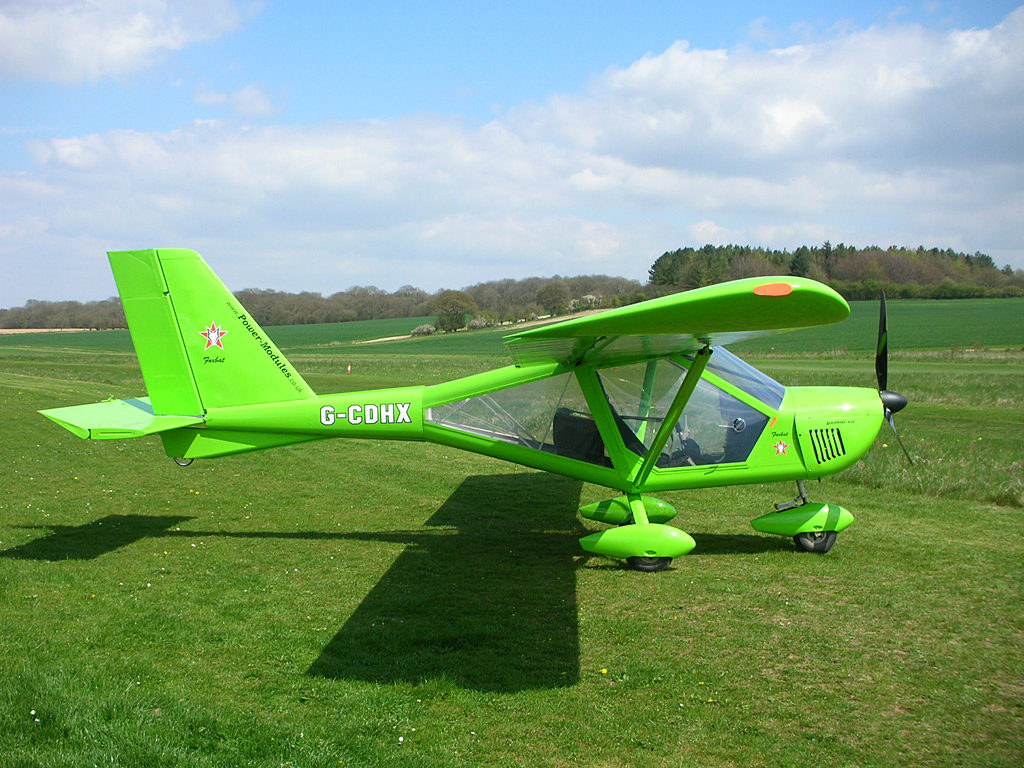
A-22 Foxbat

The Aeroprakt A-22 Foxbat is a Ukrainian two-seat, high-wing, tricycle landing gear light-sport aircraft that was designed by Yuri Yakovlev and is manufactured by Aeroprakt. In the United States the A-22 is referred to as the Valor, while in the UK and Australia it is called the Foxbat. It has also been marketed as the Vision. The Aeroprakt A-22 is supplied either as "ready-to-fly" factory built aircraft, or as a kit, consisting of 152 pieces. The kit can be built in about 500 man-hours.

The A-22 meets the definition of an FAI microlight.

According to Yakovlev, around 1,600 were built as of April 2024. Of these, 100 were sold to Russia before the start of the Russo-Ukrainian War.

== History ==
=== Design and development ===
Aeroprakt of Kyiv began design of the A-22 in February 1990, with the first prototype making its maiden flight on 21 October 1996, and a German-certified version entering production in 1999.

The A-22's structure is almost completely metal with the engine cowling, wing fillets and wheel spats made of composites. The wings and control surfaces are fabric covered. The aircraft has excellent visibility, due to the large amount of glazing, including convex doors, that allow the occupants to look straight down. The A-22 uses a 3-axis control system, giving the pilot full control over the aircraft. The A-22 uses flaperons in place of ailerons and flaps, giving a stall speed of 52 km/h (32 mph) with the flaperons fully down.

The kit comes with either the 80 hp (60 kW) Rotax 912UL or optionally the 100 hp (75 kW) Rotax 912ULS. The 85 hp (63 kW) Jabiru 2200 can also be fitted.

Originally the A-22 came fitted with a 40-litre inboard fuel tank behind the seats, although later models have wing tanks holding 37.5 litres per side. The propeller is a 3-blade composite ground adjustable KievProp. Dual controls are standard, using a single central "Y" yoke or optionally twin yoke control system.

=== Military usage ===
Faced with a lack of long-range precision weapon systems and restrictions on the use of Western-supplied cruise missiles, Ukraine began developing loitering munitions to strike strategic targets located deep inside Russian territory. Initially the Ukrainian Armed Forces made use of converted fixed-wing aircraft procured from the civilian market, such as the A-22. Although the UAF has managed to produce purpose-build systems, unmanned conversions of the A-22 still remain in use.

Fabian Hoffman, research fellow at the University of Oslo describes these conversions as a "rather complex weapon system," fitted with explosives and a guidance system; and it also flies at a relatively low altitude, making difficult for enemy radars to track. They were used against a drone factory in the Republic of Tatarstan in April 2024, while another was reportedly used against an oil refinery in the Republic of Bashkortostan in May 2024. On 6 November 2024, another A-22 loitering munition was reportedly used on a strike against a naval base in Dagestan.

At least one has been used in the drone hunting role targeting small fixed wing drones with a passenger armed with a Malyuk rifle.

== Operational history ==
In April 2023, two Aeroprakt A22 flown by Oleksandr Morozov and Dmytro Schymansky, pilots belonging to the Ukrainian Civil Air Patrol, were shot down and taken prisoner by Russian forces in Bryansk oblast. Both men were tried and sentenced as terrorists, on charges of illegal border crossing, attempting to engage in aerial bombing and possession of firearms.

As of April 2024, the Armed Forces of Ukraine have begun using Aeroprakt A22 aircraft modified into unmanned loitering munitions.

As of July 2024, at least one A22 has been used as a drone interceptor. A video depicted a team of a pilot and gunner attacking airborne fixed-wing Russian drones with a Malyuk automatic rifle.

On 6 November 2024, an A22-based loitering munition attacked and damaged multiple warships of the Caspian Flotilla, namely, two Gepard-class frigates and at least one Buyan-class corvette.

On the night of 30 January 2025, in Bryansk oblast, the 1st Center of the Unmanned Systems Forces (then known as the 14th Unmanned Aerial Vehicle Regiment) carried out bombing runs on the Novozybkov pumping station of the Druzhba pipeline. The A22 drones used to this end were not loitering munitions, but rather remotely-controlled fixed-wing dive bombers carrying FAB-250 aerial bombs, with smaller improvised aerial bombs strapped below the wings. At least one A22 was shot down.

On 21 August 2025, the same type of drone dive bombers have been used to bomb the Unecha pumping station of the Druzhba pipeline, causing heavy damage. This was followed up on 29 August 2025 with dive bombing of the 8-N pumping station near Naitovpovichi belonging to Transneft.

On the night of 6 to 7 September 2025, A-22 based drone dive bombers carried out a follow-up attack on the 8-N pumping station. Soon thereafter, on the night of September 7, drone bombers also attacked the Ilsky oil refinery in Krasnodar Krai.

== Variants ==
A-22L2
Ultralight version built in Ukraine with a maximum takeoff mass of 472.5 kg (1,042 lb) for the landplane, also available as a seaplane.
A-22LS
Light-sport version for the American market with a higher maximum takeoff mass of 600 kg (1,323 lb)
A-22 UAV
Loitering munition conversion for the Ukrainian Armed Forces for long-range strikes in Russian territory. It has an estimated range of 1,000 km (620 mi). Aeroprakt founder and chief designer Yuri Yakovlev denied that the company was involved in these conversions, but admitted that it is possible for the aircraft to be converted into an unmanned aerial vehicle.

== Military operators ==
Ukraine

- Civil Air Patrol (Ukraine)
- Unmanned Systems Forces

== Specifications (A-22 Valor, Rotax 912 ULS engine) ==
Data from Jane's All The World's Aircraft 2003–2004

General characteristics

- Crew: one
- Capacity: one passenger
- Length: 6.3 m (20 ft 8 in)
- Wingspan: 10.1 m (33 ft 2 in)
- Height: 2.4 m (7 ft 10 in)
- Wing area: 13.7 m^{2} (147 sq ft)
- Airfoil: TsAGI P-IIIA-15
- Empty weight: 260 kg (573 lb)
- Max takeoff weight: 450 kg (992 lb)
- Powerplant: 1 × Rotax 912ULS 4-cylinder air-cooled horizontally-opposed piston engine, 73.5 kW (98.6 hp)
- Propellers: 3-bladed Aeroprakt ground-adjustable propeller, 1.68 m (5 ft 6 in) diameter

Performance

- Maximum speed: 170 km/h (110 mph, 92 kn)
- Cruise speed: 160 km/h (99 mph, 86 kn)
- Stall speed: 55 km/h (34 mph, 30 kn)
- Range: 1,100 km (680 mi, 590 nmi) with maximum fuel
- Service ceiling: 4,000 m (13,000 ft)
- g limits: +4/-2
- Rate of climb: 5 m/s (980 ft/min)
- Power/mass: 0.166 kW/kg (0.101 hp/lb)
- Take-off run: 90 m (295 ft)
- Landing run: 90 m (295 ft)
