= Fiat A.22 =

1920s Italian piston aircraft engine

A.22
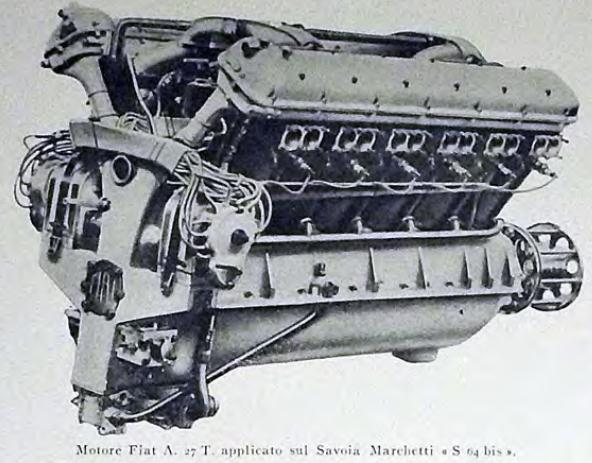
- Fiat A.22 T
- Type: Water-cooled V12
- National origin: Italy
- Manufacturer: Fiat Aviazione
- First run: 1926
- Number built: "several hundred"
- Developed into: Fiat AS.2

The Fiat A.22 was an Italian water-cooled V12 aircraft engine from the 1920s. It produced 425 kW (570 hp) and powered several absolute world distance records as well as commercial passenger flights.

== Design and development ==
During the second half of the 1920s Fiat introduced several water-cooled aircraft engines, including the A.20, A.22, A24, A.25 and A.30. They were all upright V12s with 60° between the cylinder banks; capacities ranged between 18.7 L and 54.5 L (1,141-3,326 cu in) and power outputs between 320 kW and 745 kW (430-1,000 hp).

Producing 425 kW (570 hp) from 27.5 L (1,678 cu in), the A.22 was towards the middle of these ranges. When Fiat were advised by the government to simplify their water-cooled product line, they focussed on the A.20, A.22 and A.30 models. The A.22 was first run in 1926 and a "few hundred" were built.

The A.22 was developed into the Fiat AS.2 and AS.3 Schneider Trophy race engines.

== Operational history ==
The A.22 was best known for its contribution to some world long distance record flights made by the single engine landplane Savoia-Marchetti S.64, which used the specially adapted A.22 T. version. Between 31 May and 2 June 1928 this aircraft flew non-stop for 7,665 km (4,763 mi) to capture the world closed circuit distance record. The flight lasted 58 hr 34 min; the two crew, Capt. Arturo Ferrarin and Major Del Prete took turns as pilot. A month later, the same crew set a new world straight-line distance record of 7,187 km (4,467 mi), flying from Italy to Brazil in 47 hr 55 min. The closed circuit record was later taken by the French but a slightly revised S.64bis recovered it for Italy with a distance of 8,187 km (5,088 mi) flown in 67 hr 13 min on 31 May-2 June 1930.

The A.22R powered more conventional, airline, flights in a Savoia-Marchetti S.66 three engine flying boat operated by Ala Littoria on the Rome-Cagliari-Tripoli and Rome-Athens-Alexandria routes.

== Variants ==
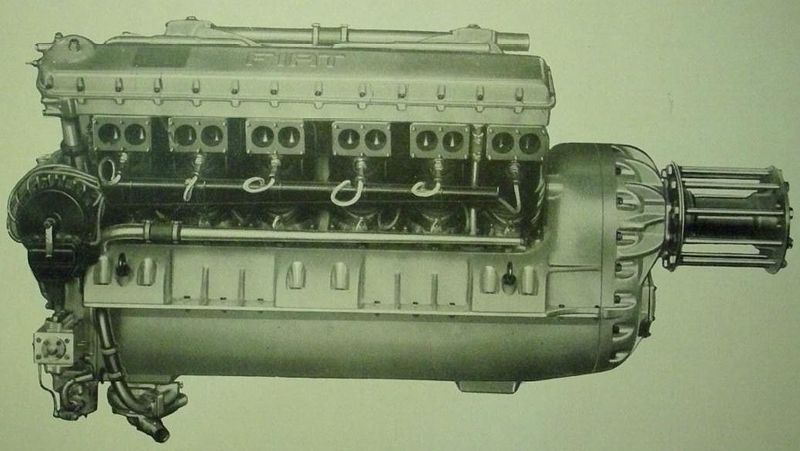
Fiat A.22 R.

From Jane's all the World's Aircraft 1938

A.22
un-geared, compression ratio 5.5:1.
A.22 R.
(R - Riduttori - reduction gear) Geared 0.5:1, compression ratio 5.5:1.
A.22 S.
High compression, compression ratio 6:1.
A.22 AQ.
(AQ - Alta Quota - high altitude) Direct drive, compression ratio 7.5:1.
A.22 AQ.R.
(AQ.R. - Alta Quota Riduttori - high altitude geared) High altitude 0.5:1 geared engine, compression ratio 7.5:1.
A.22 T.
Special version for Savoia-Marchetti S.64.

== Applications ==
From Thompson

- Savoia-Marchetti S.55
- Savoia-Marchetti S.64
- Savoia-Marchetti S.66

== Specifications (A.22 R.) ==
Data from Flight 25 July 1929, pp. 773–4 and Jane's All the World's Aircraft 1938

=== General characteristics ===
- Type: water-cooled 60° upright V12
- Bore: 135 mm (5.31 in)
- Stroke: 160 mm (6.29 in)
- Displacement: 27.5 L (1,678 cu in)
- Dry weight: including propeller hub, 455 kg (1,004 lb)

=== Components ===
- Valvetrain: Two overhead camshafts, driven via enclosed, inclined shafts. The cams operate two inlet and two exhaust valves per cylinderHoused under aluminium casings.
- Fuel system: Twin water heated Fiat carburettors mounted between cylinder banks, one serving each bank. Two spark plugs per cylinder, placed horizontally and opposite each other, supplied by two Marelli MF.12 magnetos.
- Oil system: One delivery pump and two scavenge pumps, in a single unit.
- Cooling system: water, with centrifugal pump.
- Reduction gear: spur gear, lubricated via oil spout.
- Cylinders: Forged steel barrels, with closed, flat ends.
- Pistons: Aluminium alloy, two compression rings and one scraper ring above a fully floating gudgeon pin, with a second scraper ring below it.
- Crankshaft: Each six throw, seven bearings.
- Crankcase: Each an aluminium casting, split on crankshaft centre line. Bolted-on duralumin end caps.

=== Performance ===
- Power output: normal, 425 kW (570 hp) at 1,900 rpm at sea level. Maximum, 462 kW (620 hp) at 2,100 rpm.
- Compression ratio: 5.5:1

== See also ==
Related lists

- List of aircraft engines
