= Macchi M.67 =

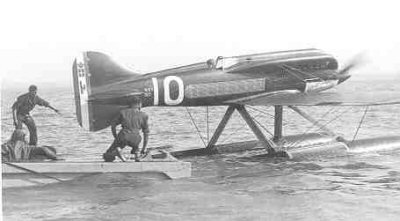

General information
- Type: Racing seaplane
- National origin: Italy
- Manufacturer: Macchi
- Designer: Mario Castoldi
- Number built: 3

History
- First flight: 10 July 1929
- Developed from: Macchi M.39

The Macchi M.67, was an Italian racing seaplane designed by Mario Castoldi and built by Macchi for the 1929 Schneider Trophy race.

== Design and development ==
Castoldi based the design of the M.67, (a single-seat, low-wing, monoplane, twin-float floatplane), on that of the earlier Macchi M.39, which had competed for Italy in the 1926 and 1927 Schneider Trophy races, following the M.39's layout but strengthened to accommodate the 18-cylinder, 57.256 L (3,494 cu in), 1,341 kW (1,798 hp) Isotta-Fraschini Asso 1000("Ace") 1000 W-18 engine, a much bigger and more powerful engine than the Fiat AS.2 V12 fitted to the M.39. The M.67 carried fuel in its floats; the powerful engine drove a three-bladed propeller which created a large amount of torque. To provide extra flotation allowing smaller floats, lighter structure and less drag, fuel was carried in integral tanks built into the floats. To counter the high torque from the propeller, more fuel was carried in one float than the other, reducing swing on take-off dramatically due to reduced asymmetric hydro-dynamic drag, but also causing high out of trim forces in roll when airborne.

Although the Italian public expressed a great deal of concern that the Asso 1000 engine was not ready for Schneider Trophy competition—Isotta-Fraschini built 27 of them for the 1929 Schneider Trophy race, but some exploded during testing—the Italian Air Minister, Italo Balbo (1896–1940), believed that the M.67 had the best chance of winning the race and selected it to represent Italy. Macchi built three M.67s.

== Operational history ==
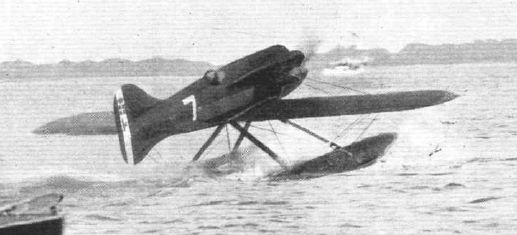

The M.67s underwent testing on Lake Garda in northern Italy. In August 1929 Regia Aeronautica (Italian Royal Air Force) Captain Giuseppe Motta was killed when his M.67 suddenly dived into the lake during a test flight in which he reached 583 kilometers per hour (362 miles per hour). Italy asked the 1929 race's hosts, the British Royal Aero Club, to postpone the race to allow Italy to correct the flaws in the M.67 and Asso 1000 engine, but the British refused. The Italians decided to enter the two surviving M.67s in the race despite the risk to their pilots, Balbo announcing that "the Italian team is going to England merely to perform a gesture of chivalrous sportsmanship." Italy also entered a Macchi M.52R floatplane in the race.

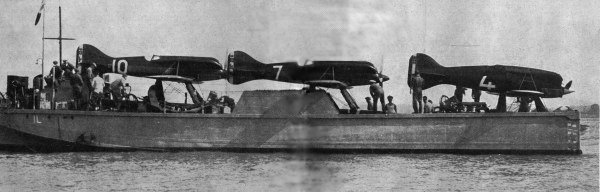
Italy's three entrants in the 1929 Schneider Trophy race. The two M.67s are at left and center; the Macchi M.52R, which took second place, is at right.

The race took place at Calshot Spit in the United Kingdom and began on 7 September 1929, with Lieutenants Remo Cadringher and Giovanni Monti flying the two M.67s. Cadringher's M.67 began the race with an impressive burst of speed, but skidded in the first turn as its cockpit filled with blinding, choking smoke, and fumes; Cadringher went into a high-speed spin, pulled out of it over land, then completed one lap at an average speed of 457 kilometers (284 mi) per hour before having to land, unable to see the pylons marking the turns due to smoke in the cockpit. Monti completed the first lap at an average speed of 485.5 kilometers (301.7 mi) per hour, but his M.67's radiator burst as he began the second lap; scalded by steam and boiling water entering his cockpit, Monti managed to make an emergency landing and was taken to a hospital.

The M.52R completed the race, taking second place. During the banquet celebrating the end of the race, Balbo said, "We have finished playing our part as sportsmen. Tomorrow our work as competitors will begin," signalling Italy's intention to be more competitive in the next Schneider Trophy race, scheduled for 1931.

== Preserved aircraft ==
An M.67 is preserved in Italy at the Museo storico dell'Aeronautica Militare di Vigna di Valle.

== Operators ==
Kingdom of Italy

== Specifications ==
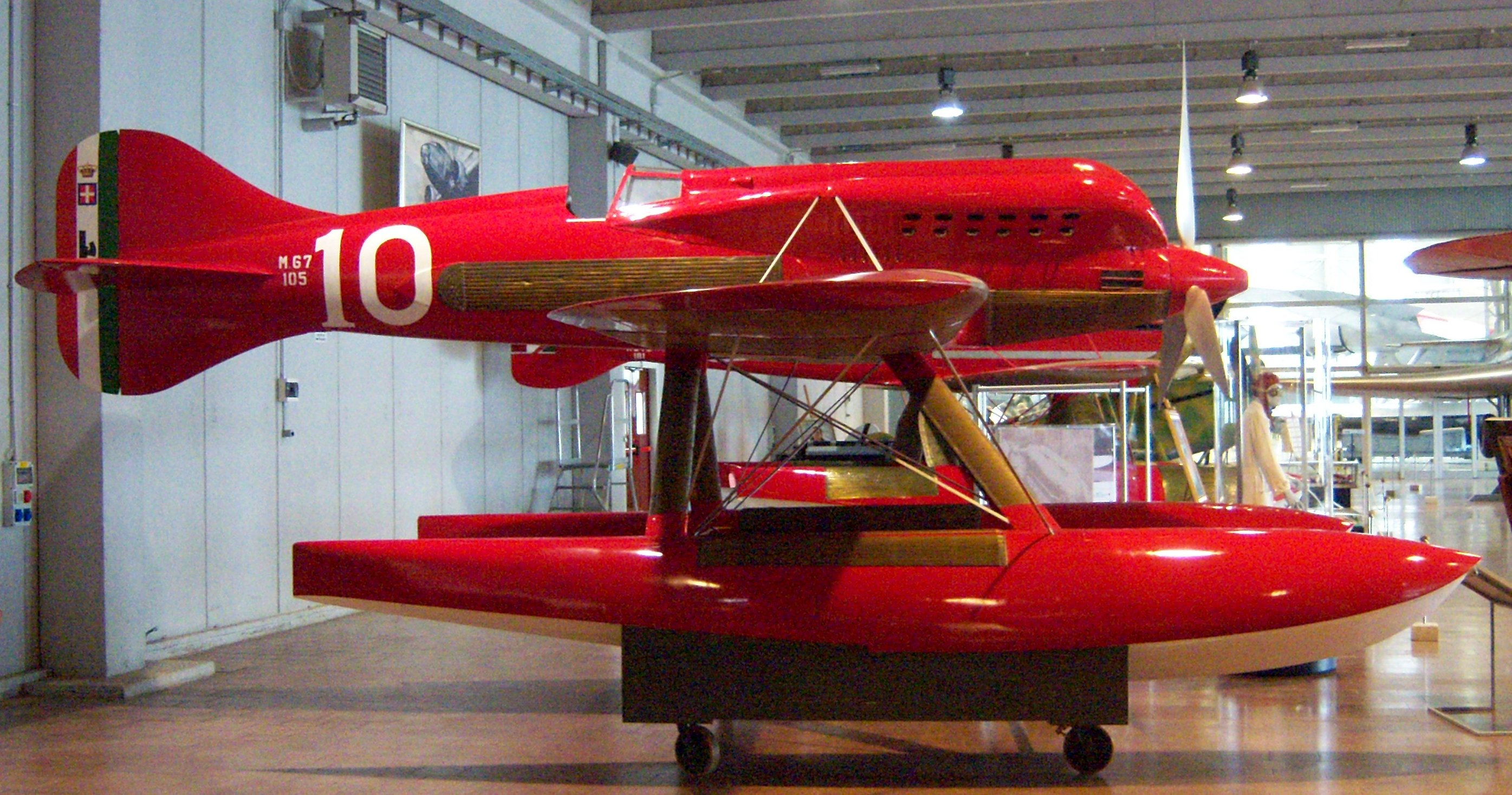
A Macchi M.67 preserved in Italy at the Museo storico dell'Aeronautica Militare di Vigna di Valle.

Data from "When Seaplanes Ruled the Sky", Italian Civil and Military aircraft 1930–1945

General characteristics

- Crew: 1
- Length: 7.65 m (25 ft 1 in)
- Wingspan: 9.98 m (32 ft 9 in)
- Wing area: 13.3 m^{2} (143 sq ft)
- Empty weight: 1,765 kg (3,891 lb)
- Gross weight: 2,180 kg (4,806 lb)
- Powerplant: 1 × Isotta Fraschini Asso 1000 (formerly 750-M) W-18 liquid-cooled piston engine, 1,341 kW (1,798 hp)

Performance

- Maximum speed: 560 km/h (348 mph, 302 kn)

== See also ==
- Alenia Aermacchi
- Schneider Trophy

Related development

- Macchi M.39

Aircraft of comparable role, configuration, and era

- Macchi M.52R

Related lists

- List of flying boats and floatplanes
