= Arturo Ferrarin =

Italian aviator

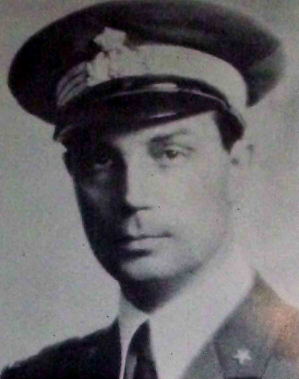
- Born: 13 February 1895; Thiene, Italy
- Died: 18 July 1941 (aged 46); Guidonia Montecelio, Italy
- Military career
- Allegiance: Kingdom of Italy
- Branch: Regia Aeronautica
- Conflicts: World War I
- Awards: Silver Medal of Military Valor; War Cross for Military Valor; Gold Medal of Aeronautic Valor

Arturo Ferrarin (13 February 1895 – 18 July 1941) was an Italian pioneer aviator. His exploits included winning the "Rome-Tokyo Raid" air race in 1920 and a non-stop flight from Italy to Brazil in 1928 with fellow aviator Carlo Del Prete. The latter flight set the world distance record for a non-stop flight. Ferrarin, who was born in Thiene and was a decorated veteran of the Italian Royal Air Force during World War I, died in a plane crash at Guidonia Montecelio in 1941.

== Early life ==
Ferrarin was born in Thiene in the Province of Vicenza to Maria (née Ciscato) and Antonio Ferrarin, a textiles industrialist. He initially studied classics at the Liceo Foscarini in Venice, but his preference for technical subjects led him to withdraw from the liceo and finish his studies at the Fusinieri Institute in Vicenza. After completing his course there in 1915, he served as a machine gunner in the Italian Military Air Corps and qualified as a pilot in 1916. He was subsequently stationed at San Pietro in Gu. During World War I, he made numerous flights with the 82nd Squadron and was decorated with the Silver Medal of Military Valor and twice with the War Cross for Military Valor.

== Aviation exploits ==
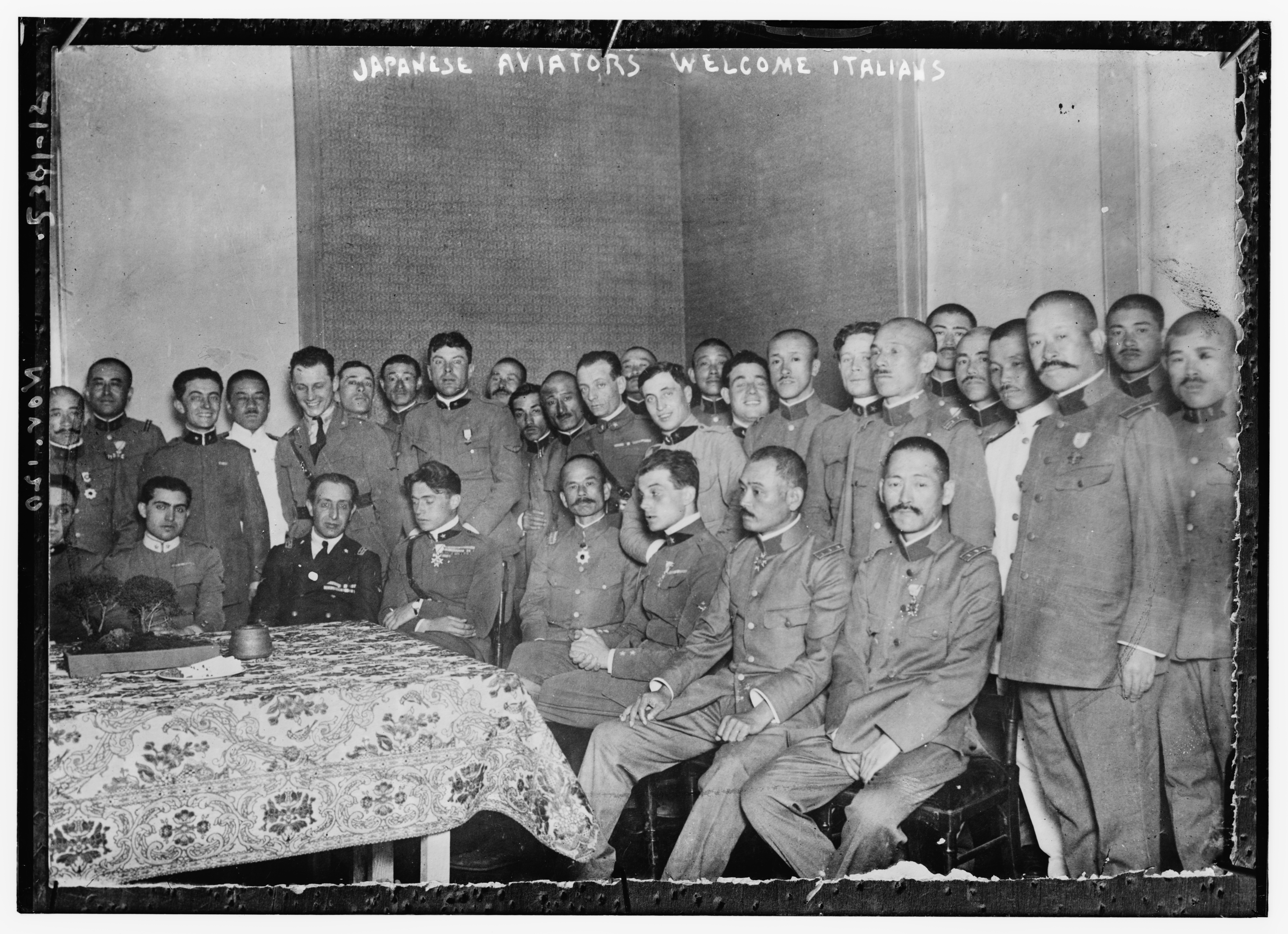
Japanese aviators welcome Ferrarin. 1920

After World War I ended, Ferrarin devoted himself to aviation contests and exhibitions. It was his flight in a race from Rome to Tokyo, known as the "Rome-Tokyo Raid", which brought him international fame. Ferrarin and Guido Masiero completed the trip of 8000 km in 112 hours of flight in an Ansaldo SVA bi-plane. The flight was done in multiple stages which included stops in Greece, Syria, India, Burma, Thailand, French Indochina (now Viet Nam), China, and Korea. The last leg of the flight, Osaka to Tokyo, was completed on 30 May 1920. Their plane was donated to the Japanese Imperial War Museum where it was on exhibit until the museum was destroyed during World War II.

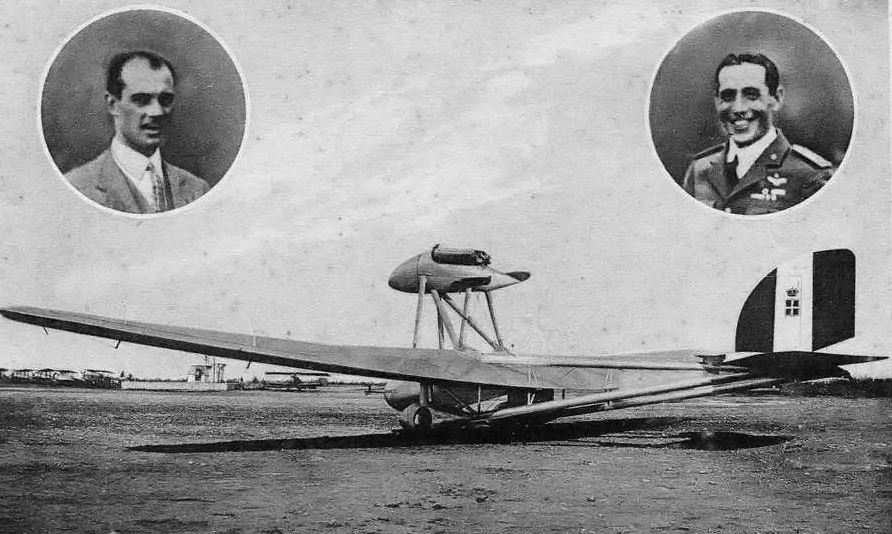
Ferrarin and Carlo Del Prete with their Savoia-Marchetti S.64

Ferrarin participated twice in the Schneider Cup, flying a Macchi M.39 in 1926 and a Macchi M.52 in 1927. On both occasions, he had to withdraw before the end of the race due to engine trouble. In July 1928 he and fellow aviator Carlo Del Prete, aboard a single-engine land aircraft Savoia-Marchetti S.64 flew from Guidonia Montecelio near Rome to Touros, a coastal city in northeast Brazil. The flight set the world distance record for a non-stop flight—7188 km in 49 hours 19 minutes. In May of that year, they had set a world distance over a closed circuit, making 51 round trips between Torre Flavia near Ladispoli and Anzio, covering 7,666 km and staying aloft for 58 hours 34 minutes.

== Later career and death ==
On his return to Italy from Brazil in 1928 Ferrarin was awarded the Gold Medal of Aeronautic Valor. However, the Italy-Brazil flight proved to be Ferrarin's last major aviation exploit. In 1929 Italo Balbo, a powerful member of Mussolini's Fascist government, had become the Minister of the Italian Air Force. He was opposed to the participation of Italian airmen in the races and competitions that marked the 1920s because they gave prestige to individuals rather than the air weaponry of the regime which he was anxious to promote. At first, Ferrarin acquiesced to Balbo's policy, but after a serious quarrel in 1930, their relationship deteriorated. Balbo eventually demanded and received Ferrarin's leave of absence from the Air Force.

Ferrarin married Adelaide Castiglioni on 11 June 1931 in an elaborate wedding in Milan with Balbo and Prince Amedeo, Duke of Aosta as witnesses. The reception was held at the Palazzo Castiglioni which Adelaide's father had built in 1903. The couple departed for their honeymoon in a plane piloted by Ferrarin. After leaving the Air Force, Ferrarin served as a director of the private aviation company Avio Linee Italiane, a division of FIAT whose principal shareholders were the Agnelli family. In July 1935 Ferrarin was piloting Giovanni Agnelli's seaplane to Forte dei Marmi with Agnelli's son Edoardo as his passenger when it ditched in Genoa, hit an obstacle in the water, and overturned. Ferrarin escaped unharmed, but Edoardo Agnelli was killed instantly. Six years later, a plane crash would also claim Ferrarin's life. He died on 18 July 1941 at the age of 46 when a new experimental plane he was testing crashed at Guidonia Montecelio.

Ferrarin's military funeral was held in Rome followed by burial in the cemetery of Induno Olona in the Province of Varese, the home of Adelaide Castiglioni's family.

== Legacy ==
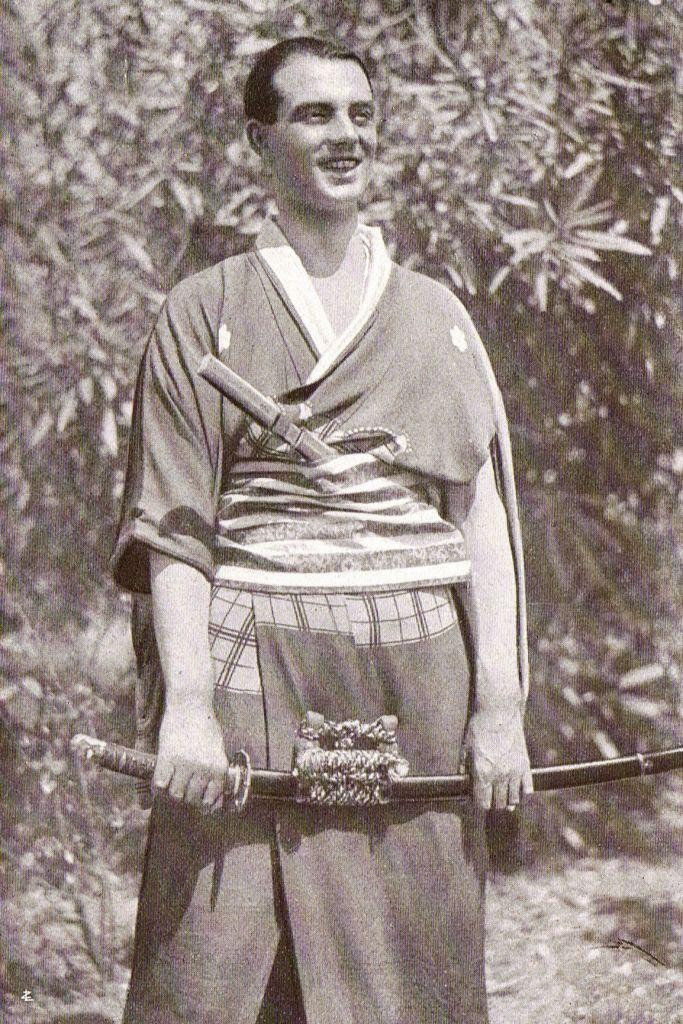
Arturo Ferrarin in Japan. 1920

In 1970, the 50th anniversary of Ferrarin's Rome-Tokyo flight, the new airport in Thiene was named in his honour and inaugurated in a ceremony attended by officials from the Italian Air Force, the Ministry of Transport and Aviation, and the Japanese Embassy as well as Ferrarin's widow and his two sons Carlo and Roberto.

Other entities named in Ferrarin's honour include a Boeing 767 in the Alitalia fleet, the Istituto Aeronautico Arturo Ferrarin in Gallarate, Piazza Arturo Ferrarin in Thiene, and streets in Vicenza, Verona, and Fiumicino Airport.

Ferrarin's exploits inspired the character "Ferrarin" in the Japanese animated film Porco Rosso directed by Hayao Miyazaki.

== See also ==
- 1928 distance records in Carlo Del Prete for a detailed account of the 1928 records set by Ferrarin and Del Prete.
