= Macchi C.200 Saetta =

1930s Italian fighter aircraft

C.200 Saetta
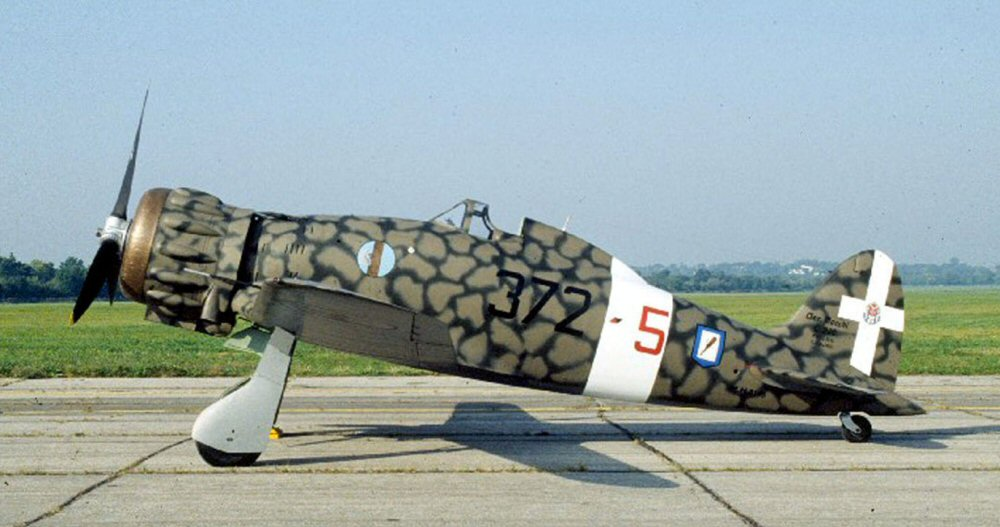
- The National Museum of the United States Air Force's preserved C.200 in the markings of 372^{o} Squadriglia, Regia Aeronautica.

General information
- Type: Fighter
- Manufacturer: Aeronautica Macchi
- Designer: Mario Castoldi
- Primary user: Regia Aeronautica
- Number built: 1,151 + 2 Prototypes

History
- Introduction date: 1939
- First flight: 24 December 1937
- Retired: 1947
- Developed into: Macchi C.202

The Macchi C.200 Saetta (Italian: "Lightning"), or MC.200, is a fighter aircraft developed and manufactured by Aeronautica Macchi in Italy. Various versions were flown by the Regia Aeronautica (Italian Air Force) who used the type throughout the Second World War.

The C.200 was designed by Mario Castoldi, Macchi's lead designer, to serve as a modern monoplane fighter aircraft, furnished with retractable landing gear and powered by a radial engine. The C.200 possessed excellent maneuverability, and its general flying characteristics left little to be desired. Its stability in a high-speed dive was exceptional, but it was underpowered and underarmed in comparison to its contemporaries. Early on, there were a number of crashes caused by stability problems, nearly resulting in the grounding of the type; these problems were ultimately addressed via aerodynamic modifications to the wing.

From the time Italy entered the Second World War on 10 June 1940, until the signing of the armistice of 8 September 1943, the C. 200 flew more operational sorties than any other Italian aircraft. The Saetta saw operational service in Greece, North Africa, Yugoslavia, across the Mediterranean, and in the Soviet Union (where it obtained an excellent kill to loss ratio of 88 to 15). The plane's very strong all-metal construction and air-cooled engine made the aircraft ideal for conducting ground attack missions; several units flew it as a fighter-bomber. Over 1,000 aircraft had been constructed by the end of the war.

== Development ==
=== Origins ===
In early 1935 Mario Castoldi, lead designer of Italian aircraft company Macchi, commenced work on a series of design studies for a modern monoplane fighter aircraft, which was to be furnished with retractable landing gear. Castoldi had previously designed several racing aircraft that had competed for the Schneider Trophy, including the Macchi M.39, which won the competition in 1926. He had also designed the M.C. 72. From an early stage, the concept aircraft that emerged from these studies became known as the C.200.

In 1936, in the aftermath of Italy's campaigns in East Africa, an official program was initiated with the aim of completely re-equipping the Regia Aeronautica with a new interceptor aircraft of modern design. The 10 February 1936 specifications, formulated and published by the Ministero dell'Aeronatica, called for an aircraft powered by a single radial engine, which was to be capable of a top speed of 500 km/h (310 mph) and a climb rate of 6,000 meters in 5 minutes. Additional requirements were soon specified: the aircraft was to be capable of being used as an interceptor with a flight endurance time of two hours and armed with a single (later increased to two) 12.7 mm (0.50 in) machine gun.

=== Prototypes ===
In response to the prescribed demand for a modern fighter aircraft, Castoldi submitted a proposal for an aircraft based upon his 1935 design studies. On 24 December 1937, the first prototype (MM.336) C.200 conducted its maiden flight at Lonate Pozzolo, Varese, with Macchi chief test pilot Giuseppe Burei at the controls. Officials within the ministry and Macchi's design team fought over the retention of the characteristic hump used to enhance cockpit visibility; after a protracted argument, the feature was ultimately retained.

The first prototype was followed by the second prototype early the following year. During testing, the aircraft reportedly attained 805 km/h (500 mph) in a dive free of negative tendencies such as flutter and other aeroelastic issues; although it could achieve only 500 km/h (310 mph) in level flight due to a lack of engine power. Nevertheless, this capability was superior than the performance of the competing Fiat G.50 Freccia, Reggiane Re.2000, A.U.T. 18, IMAM Ro.51, and Caproni-Vizzola F.5; of these, the Re.2000 was seen as the most capable of the C.200's rivals, being more maneuverable and capable of greater performance at low altitude but lacking in structural strength.

The C.200 benefitted greatly from preparations that were being made for major expansion of the Italian Air Force, known as Programme R. In 1938, the C.200 was selected as the winner of the tender "Caccia I" (Fighter 1) of the Regia Aeronautica. This choice came in spite of mixed results during flight testing at Guidonia airport; on 11 June 1938, Major Ugo Borgogno warned that when tight turns at beyond 90° were attempted, the aircraft became extremely difficult to control, including a tendency to turn upside down, mostly to the right and entering into a violent flat spin.

=== Production ===
Shortly following the completion of the second prototype, an initial order for 99 production aircraft was placed with Macchi. The G.50, which during the same flight tests held at Guidonia airport had out-turned the Macchi, was also placed in limited production, because it had been determined that the former could be brought into service earlier. The decision, or indecision, involved in producing multiple overlapping types led to greater inefficiencies in both production and in operation. In June 1939, production of the C.200 formally commenced.

The most serious handicap was the low production rate of the type. According to some reports, in excess of 22,000 hours in production time was attributed to the use of antiquated construction technology. A lack of urgency shown by the authorities regarding standardisation was also viewed as having negatively affected mass production efforts, particularly in light of the lack of availability of key resources in Italy at the time. In order to improve the rate of output, the C.200 remained almost unchanged throughout its production life, save for adjustments to the cockpit in response to pilot feedback.

In addition to Macchi (who completed 397 airframes), the C.200 was also constructed by Italian aircraft companies Società Italiana Ernesto Breda (556) and SAI Ambrosini (200) under a subcontracting arrangement intended to produce 1,200 aircraft between 1939 and 1943. However, during 1940, the termination of all production of the type was considered in response to aerodynamic performance problems that had caused the loss of multiple aircraft; the type was retained after changes were made to the wing to rectify a tendency to go into an uncontrollable spin that could occur during turns.

In an attempt to improve performance, a C.201 prototype was created with a 750 kW (1,010 hp) Fiat A.76 engine; work on this prototype was later abandoned in favour of the Daimler-Benz DB 601-powered C.202. At one point, it was intended that the Saetta was to have been replaced outright by the C.202 after only a single year in production. However, the C.200's service life was extended because Alfa Romeo proved to be incapable of producing enough of the RA.1000 (license-built DB 601) engines needed by the newer aircraft. This contributed to the decision to construct further C.200s that used C.202 components as an interim measure while waiting for the production rate of the latter's engine to be increased.

At the beginning of 1940, Denmark was set to place an order for 12 C.200s to replace its ageing Hawker Nimrod fighters, but the deal fell through when Germany invaded Denmark. A total of 1,153 Saettas were eventually produced, but only 33 remained operational by the time of the armistice between Italy and the Allies in September 1943.

== Design ==
The Macchi C.200 was a modern all-metal cantilever low-wing monoplane, which was equipped with retractable landing gear and an enclosed cockpit. The fuselage was of semi-monocoque construction, with self-sealing fuel tanks under the pilot's seat, and in the centre section of the wing. The distinctive "hump" elevated the partially open cockpit to provide the pilot with an unusually wide field of view over the engine. The wing had an advanced system whereby the hydraulically actuated flaps were interconnected with the ailerons, so that when the flaps were lowered the ailerons drooped as well. As a result of its ultimate load factor of 15.1, it could reach speeds as fast as 800 km/h (500 mph) true airspeed during dives.

Power was provided by a 650 kW (870 hp) Fiat A.74 radial engine, although Castoldi preferred inline engines, and had used them to power all of his previous designs. Under a direttiva (air ministry specification) of 1932, Italian industrial leaders had been instructed to concentrate solely on radial engines for fighters, due to their superior reliability. The A.74 was a re-design of the American Pratt & Whitney R-1830 SC-4 Twin Wasp by engineers Tranquillo Zerbi and Antonio Fessia, and was the only Italian-built engine that could provide a level of reliability comparable to Allied designs. The licence-built A.74 engine could be problematic. In late spring 1941, 4^{o} Stormo's Macchi C.200s, then based in Sicily, had all the A.74s produced by the Reggiane factory replaced because they were defective. The elite unit had to abort many missions against Malta due to engine problems. While some considered the Macchi C.200 to have been underpowered, the air-cooled radial engine provided some pilot protection during strafing missions. Consequently, the C.200 was often used as a cacciabombardiere (fighter-bomber).

The C.200 was typically armed with a pair of 12.7 mm (0.50 in) Breda-SAFAT machine guns; while these were often considered to be insufficient, the Saetta was able to compete with contemporary Allied fighters. According to aviation author Gianni Cattaneo, perhaps the greatest weakness of the C.200 was its light machine gun armament. Moreover, a radio was not fitted as standard.

Like other early Italian monoplanes, the C.200 suffered from a dangerous tendency to spin. Early production C.200 aircraft showed autorotation problems similar to those found in the Fiat G.50 Freccia, IMAM Ro.51 and the Aeronautica Umbra Trojani AUT.18. At the beginning of 1940, a pair of deadly accidents occurred due to autorotation. Aircraft production and deliveries were halted while the Regia Aeronautica evaluated the potential for abandoning use of the type, as the skill involved in flying the C.200 was considered to be beyond that of the average pilot. The problem was a product of the profile of the wing. Castoldi soon tested a new profile, but a solution to the autorotation problem was found by Sergio Stefanutti, chief designer of SAI Ambrosini in Passignano sul Trasimeno, based on studies conducted by German aircraft engineer Willy Messerschmitt and the American National Advisory Committee for Aeronautics (NACA). He redesigned the wing section with a variable, instead of constant, profile, which was achieved by covering parts of the wings with plywood.

The new wing entered production in 1939–1940 at SAI Ambrosini and became standard on the aircraft manufactured by Aermacchi and Breda, a licensed manufacturer. After the modified wing of the Saetta was introduced, the C.200 proved to be, for a time, the foremost Italian fighter. The first production C.200 series, did not have armour fitted to protect the pilots, as a weight-saving measure. Armour plating was incorporated when frontline units were going to replace the Saettas with the new Macchi C.202 Folgore (Thunderbolt) but in only a limited number of aircraft. After the armour was fitted, the aircraft could become difficult to fly. During aerobatic maneuvers, one could enter an extremely difficult-to-control flat spin, which would force the pilot to bail out. On 22 July 1941, Leonardo Ferrulli, one of the top-scoring Regia Aeronautica pilots, encountered the problem and was forced to bail out over Sicily.

== Operational history ==
=== Introduction ===
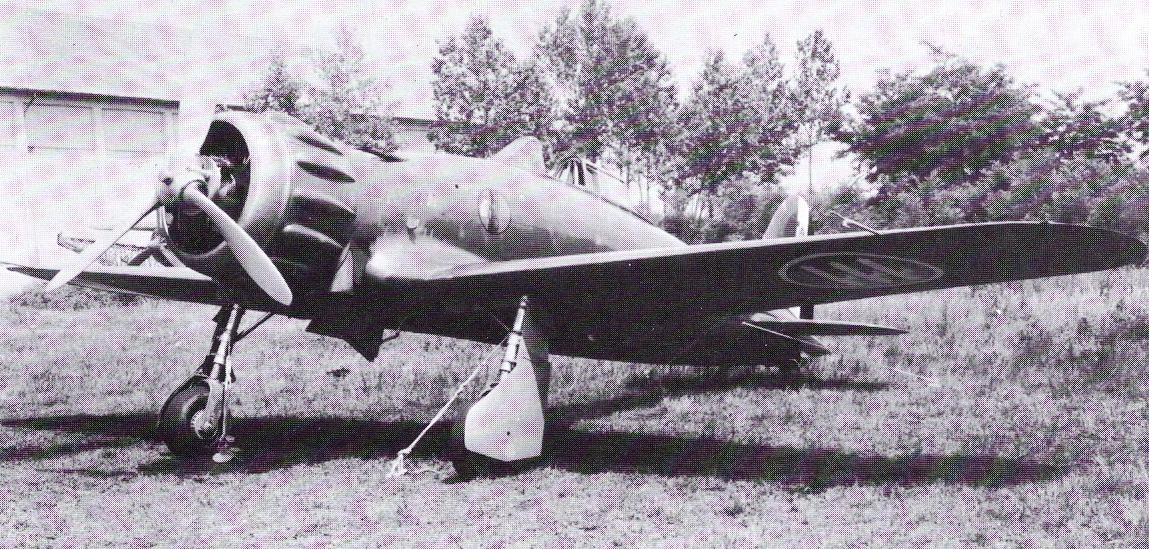
A Macchi C.200 on the ground

In August 1939, about 30 C.200 Saettas were delivered to the 10th Gruppo of the 4th Stormo, stationed in North Africa. However, pilots of this elite unit of the Regia Aeronautica opposed the adoption of the C.200, preferring the more manouvrable Fiat CR.42 instead. Accordingly, the Macchis were then transferred to the 6th Gruppo of the 1st Stormo in Sicily, who were enthusiastic supporters of the new fighter, and to the 152nd Gruppo of the 54th Stormo in Vergiate. Further units received the type during peacetime, including the 153rd Gruppo and the 369th Squadriglia.

When Italy entered the war on 10 June 1940, 144 C.200s were operational, only half of which were serviceable. The re-equipment programme, under which the type would have been widely adopted, took longer than expected; and several squadrons were still in the process of being reequipped with the C.200 at the outbreak of war. Although the first 240 aircraft had been fitted with fully enclosed cockpits, the subsequent variants were provided with open cockpits at the request of the Italian pilots, who were familiar with the open cockpits that were commonplace amongst the old biplanes.

=== Service history ===
The C.200 played no role in Italy's brief action during the Battle of France. The first C.200s to make their combat debut were those of the 6th Gruppo Autonomo C.T. (caccia terrestre, or land-attack fighter) led by Tenente Colonnello (Wing Commander) Armando Francois. This squadron was based at the Sicilian airport of Catania Fontanarossa. A Saetta from this unit was the first C.200 to be lost in combat when, on 23 June 1940, 14 C.200s (eight from 88^{a} Squadriglia, five from 79^{a} Squadriglia and one from 81^{a} Squadriglia) that were escorting 10 Savoia-Marchetti SM.79s from the 11th Stormo were intercepted by two Gloster Gladiators. Gladiator No.5519, piloted by Flight Lieutenant George Burges, jumped the bombers but was in turn attacked by a C.200 flown by Sergente Maggiore Lamberto Molinelli of 71^{a} Squadriglia over the sea off Sliema. The Macchi overshot four or five times the more agile Gladiator which eventually shot down the Saetta.

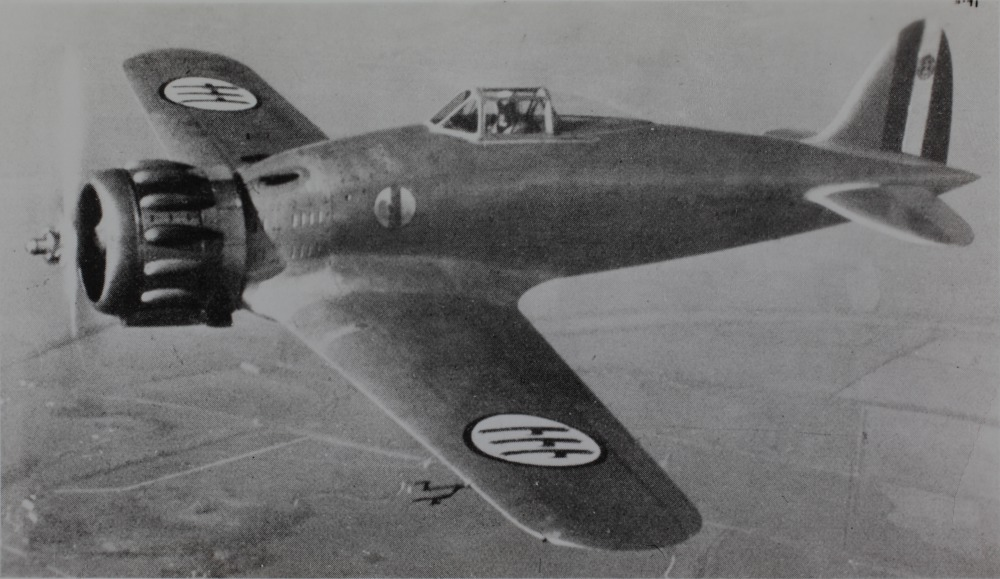
C.200 in flight

In September 1940, the C.200s of the 6th Gruppo conducted their first offensive operations in support of wider Axis efforts against the Mediterranean island of Malta, escorting Junkers Ju 87 dive-bombers. On 1 November 1940 the C.200s were credited with their first kill, a British Sunderland, on a reconnaissance mission, that was sighted and attacked just outside Augusta by a flight of Saettas on patrol. With the arrival towards the end of December 1940 of Fliegerkorps X in Sicily, the C.200s were assigned escort duty for I/StG.1 and II/StG.2 Ju 87 bombers attacking Malta, as the Stukas did not have adequate fighter cover until the arrival of 7./JG26's Bf 109s.

Soon after, British air power in the theatre was enhanced, especially by the arrival of the Hurricane fighter, which forced a redeployment of Italian forces in response. Although considered to be inferior to the Hurricane in speed, the C.200 had the advantage of manoeuvrability, turn radius and climb rate. According to aviation author Bill Gunston, the C.200 proved effective against the Hurricane, delivering outstanding dogfight performance without any vices.

While the Hurricane was faster at sea level (450 km/h (280 mph) vs the C.200's 430 km/h (270 mph), the Saetta could reach more than 500 km/h (310 mph) at 4,500 m (14,800 ft), although its speed dropped off at altitude, 490 km/h (300 mph) at 6,000 m (20,000 ft) and 350 km/h (220 mph) at 7,000 m (23,000 ft) with a maximum ceiling of 8,800 m (28,900 ft). Comparative speeds of the Hurricane Mk I were 505 km/h (314 mph) at 5,000 m (16,000 ft) and 528 km/h (328 mph) at 6,000 m (20,000 ft). Over 5,000 m (16,000 ft) and at very low levels, only the huge Vokes (anti-sand) air filter fitted to the "tropical" variants slowed the Hurricane Mk II to Macchi levels. Although the Macchi C.200 was more agile than the Hurricane, it carried a lighter armament than its British adversary.

On 6 February 1941, the 4th Stormo received C.200s from the 54th Stormo. Once the autorotation problems had been resolved, the Macchis were regarded as "very good machines, fast, manoeuvrable and strong" by Italian pilots. After intense training, on 1 April 1941, the 10th Gruppo (4th Stormo) moved to Ronchi dei Legionari airport and started active service. The C.200 subsequently saw action over Greece, Yugoslavia and the Balkans, frequently engaging in dogfights with British Gladiators and Hurricanes over the Balkans.

=== Yugoslavia ===
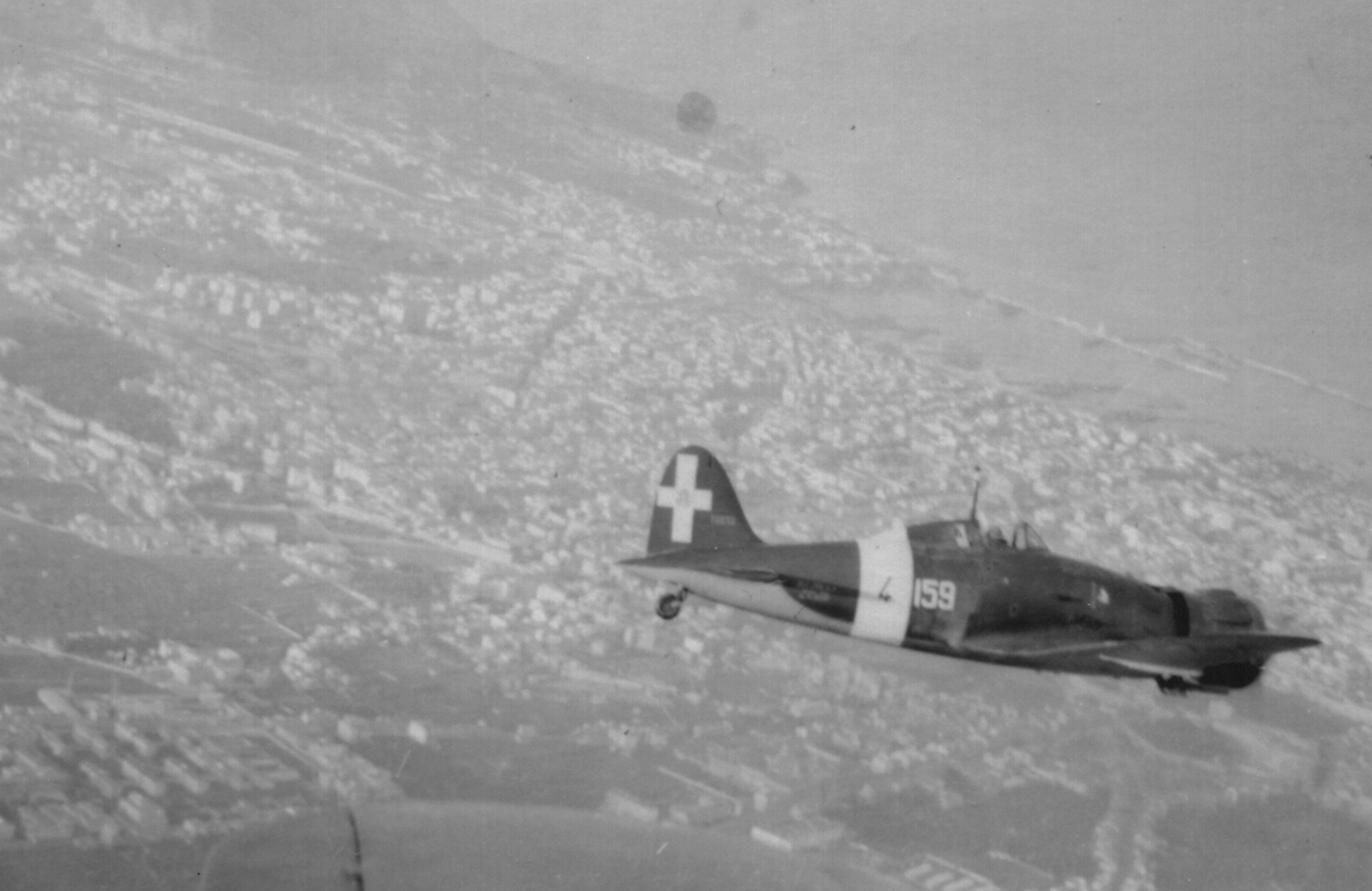
A Macchi C.200 Saetta during World War II. (From the private archive of the Riggio family)

C.200s from the 4th Stormo took part in operations against Yugoslavia right from the start of hostilities. At dawn on 6 April 1941, four C.200s from 73^{a} Squadriglia flew over Pola harbour and attacked an oil tanker, setting it on fire. Due to limited air resistance being encountered, sorties flown by the type in this theatre were usually limited to escorting and strafing.

The 4th Stormo flew its last mission against Yugoslavia on 14 April 1941: on that day, 20 C.200s from the 10th Gruppo flew up to 100 km (62 mi) south of Karlovac without meeting any enemy aircraft. Operations ended on 17 April. During those 11 days, the 4th Stormo did not lose a single C.200. Its pilots destroyed a total of 20 seaplanes and flying boats, while damaging a further 10. Additionally, they set on fire an oil tanker, a fuel truck, several other vehicles, and destroyed port installations.

=== North Africa ===
Fitted with dust filters and designated C.200AS, the Saetta saw extensive use in North Africa, greater than any other theatre of war. The Macchi's introduction was not initially well received by pilots; in 1940, the first C.200 unit, the 4th Stormo, replaced the type with the C.R.42. The first combat missions were flown as escorts for Savoia-Marchetti SM.79 bombers attacking Malta in June 1940, where one C.200 was claimed by a Gladiator. On 11 June 1940, second day of war for Italy, the C.200s of 79^{a} Squadriglia encountered one of the Sea Gladiators that had been scrambled from Hal Far, Malta. Flying Officer W. J. Wood claimed Tenente Giuseppe Pesola had been shot down, but the Italian pilot came back unscathed to his base.

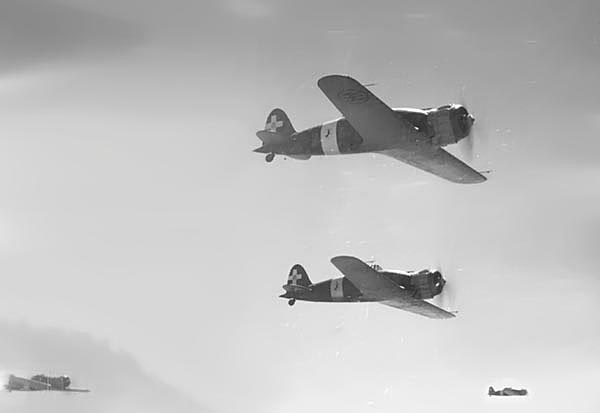
A formation of Macchi C.200s escorting bombers, probably on a mission to Malta and Tobruk.

During April 1941, the C.200s of the 374th Squadriglia became the first unit to be stationed on the North African mainland. Further units, including the 153rd Gruppo and the 157th Gruppo, were stationed on the mainland as Allied air power in the region increased in capability and numbers, including aircraft such as the Hurricane and the P-40 Warhawk. According to Cattaneo, the C.200 performed well under the conditions of the desert climate, particularly due to its high structural strength and short takeoff run.

On 8 December 1941, Macchi C.200s of the 153rd Gruppo engaged Hurricanes from 94 Squadron. A dogfight developed, with the commanding officer, Squadron Leader Linnard, attempting to intercept a Macchi attacking a Hurricane. Both aircraft were making steep turns and losing height. But Linnard was too late, and the Macchi, turning inside the Hurricane, had already hit the Hurricane's cockpit area. The stricken aircraft turned over at a low level and dived into the ground, bursting into flames. Its pilot, the New Zealand-born RAF "ace" (six enemy aircraft destroyed and many more probably destroyed) Flight Lieutenant Owen Tracey was killed.

North African and Italian-based units were routinely rotated to relieve war-weary crews, aiding the resumption of an Axis offensive in the region during early 1942. During this offensive, which led to Italian and German forces reaching the outskirts of Alexandria, Egypt, the C.200s were heavily engaged in bomber escort and low-altitude attack operations, while the newer C.202s performed high-altitude air cover duties.

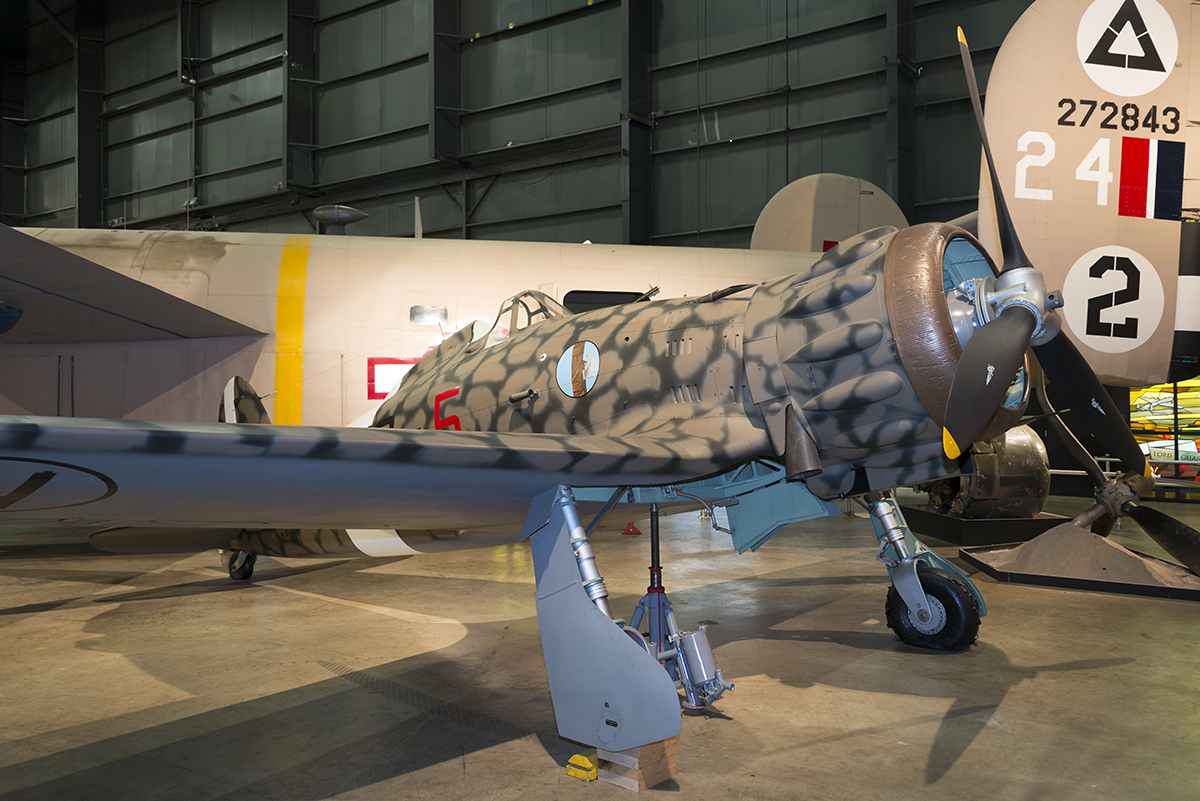
The National Museum of the United States Air Force′s Saetta carries the markings of the Regia Aeronautica′s 372^{a} Squadriglia, 153rd Gruppo.

In addition to interceptor duties, C.200s frequently operated as fighter-bombers against both land and naval objectives. The North African theatre was the first in which the type had been intentionally deployed as a fighter-bomber. During September 1942, the type was responsible for sinking the British destroyer Sikh, as well as several smaller motor vessels, near Tobruk, during Operation Agreement, an attempted amphibious assault by Allied forces.

Following the decisive victory by Commonwealth forces at El Alamein, the C.200 provided cover for the retreating Axis forces, strafing advancing Allied columns and light vehicles. However, operations by the type in the theatre were curtailed around this time by increasing shortages of spares, fuel, and components; losses in the face of numerically superior Allied air power also played a role in the rapid decline of deployable C.200s. During January 1943, many Italian aerial units were withdrawn from North Africa, leaving only a single unit operating the type. Bomb-carrying C.200s were amongst those aircraft used during Axis attempts to resist the Allied occupation of the island of Pantelleria. However, early 1943 marked the end of the C.200's viability as an effective front-line fighter.

=== Eastern Front ===
In August 1941, the Italian air force command dispatched a single air corps, formed from the 22º Gruppo Autonomo Caccia Terrestre with four squadrons and 51 C.200s to the Eastern Front with the Italian Expeditionary Corps in Russia; it was the first contribution of the Regia Aeronautica to the campaign. By 12 August 1941, all 51 C.200s had arrived at Tudora, Ștefan Vodă, near Odessa. On 13 August 1941, commanded by Maggiore Giovanni Borzoni and deployed in 359^{a}, 362^{a}, 369^{a}, and 371^{a} Squadriglia (Flights). On 27 August 1941, C.200s carried out their first operations from Krivoi Rog, achieving eight aerial victories over Soviet bombers and fighters. For a short time, the 22nd Gruppo was subordinated to Luftwaffe V. Fliegerkorps. Subsequently, they took part in the September offensive on the Dnieper; and as the offensive continued they operated sporadically from airstrips in Zaporozhye, Stalino, Borvenkovo, Voroshilovgrad, Makiivka, Oblivskaja, Millerovo, and their easternmost location, Kantemirovka, moving to Zaporozhye late in October 1941.

Maintaining operations became increasingly difficult as winter took hold, the unit having not been furnished with the necessary equipment for conducting low-temperature operations; accordingly, flying was often impossible throughout November and December. In December 1941, 371^{a} Squadriglia was transferred to Stalino, but were replaced two days later by 359^{a} with 11 C.200s. On 25 December, the C.200s flew low-level attacks against Soviet troops that had encircled the Black Shirt Legion Tagliamento, at Novo Orlowka; and 359^{a} Squadriglia intercepted Soviet fighters over Bulawa, shooting down five without loss to themselves. On 28 December, pilots of 359^{a} claimed nine Soviet aircraft, including six Polikarpov I-16 fighters, in the Timofeyevka and Polskaya area, without loss. According to Cattaneo, during the course of the three-day long 'Christmas battle', a total of 12 Soviet fighters were downed by C.200s with only a single friendly aircraft lost.

During February 1942, weather conditions had improved enough to allow for the resumption of full operations. From February onwards, the C.200 was employed in repeated attacks upon Soviet airfields at Liman, Luskotova, and Leninski Bomdardir. On 4 May 1942, the 22º Gruppo Autonomo Caccia Terrestre was withdrawn from active operation. The unit had flown 68 missions, taking part in 19 air battles and 11 ground attack missions. The 22º Gruppo was credited with 66 enemy destroyed, 16 probables, and 45 damaged and was awarded a Medaglia d'argento al valor militare (Silver Medal for military valor). The group was replaced by the newly formed 21º Gruppo Autonomo Caccia Terrestre, composed of 356^{a}, 361^{a}, 382^{a}, and 386^{a} Squadriglia. This unit, commanded by Maggiore Ettore Foschini, brought new C.202s and 18 new C.200 fighters. During the Second Battle of Kharkov (12–30 May) the Italians flew escort for the German bombers and reconnaissance aircraft.

In May, the aircraft's pilots received praise from the commander of the German 17th Army, mostly for their daring and effective attacks in the Slavyansk area. During the German advance in summer 1942, the 21st Gruppo Autonomo C.T. transferred to Makiivka airfield, and then to Voroshilovgrad and Oblivskaya.

As time went on, the type was increasingly tasked to escort German aircraft. On 24 July 1942, the unit was shifted to Tatsinskaya Airfield, with 24 Saettas. Its main task was to provide escort for Stukas in the Don Bend area, where there were few German fighters available. Hauptmann Friedrich Lang, Staffelkäpitan of 1./StG 2 reported the Italian escort as "most disappointing". The Saettas proved unable to protect the Stukas from Soviet fighters. On 25 and 26 July 1942, five C.200s were lost in aerial combat. After only three days of action from Tatsinskaya, one-third of the Italian fighters had been shot down.

The following winter, the Soviet counter-offensive resulted in the mass retreat of Axis forces. By early-December 1942, only 32 Saettas were still operating, along with 11 C.202s. However, during the first 18 months of its use on the Eastern front, together with C.202s, the C.200 had claimed an 88 to 15 victory/loss ratio, during which it had performed 1,983 escort missions, 2,557 offensive sweeps, 511 ground support sorties, and 1,310 strafing sorties.

Losses grew in the face of a more aggressive enemy flying newer aircraft. The last major action was on 17 January 1943: 25 C.200s strafed enemy troops in the Millerovo area. The aviation of the ARMIR was withdrawn on 18 January, bringing 30 C.200 and nine C.202 fighters back to Italy and leaving 15 unserviceable aircraft behind. A total of 66 Italian aircraft had been lost on the Eastern Front – against, according to official figures, 88 victories claimed during 17 months of action in that theatre.

A summary of the Italian expeditionary force operations included 2,557 offensive flights (of which 511 with bombs drops), 1,310 strafing attacks, and 1,938 escort missions, with the loss of 15 C.200s overall. The top-scoring unit was 362^{a} Squadriglia, commanded by Capitano Germano La Ferla, which claimed 30 Soviet aircraft shot down and 13 destroyed on the ground.

=== After the armistice ===
Following the signing of the armistice, which resulted in Italy's withdrawal from the Axis, only 33 C.200s remained serviceable. Shortly thereafter, 23 Saettas were transferred to Allied airfields in southern Italy, and flown for a short time by pilots of the Italian Co-Belligerent Air Force. In mid-1944, the C.200s of Southern Italy were transferred to the Leverano Fighter School. A lack of spare parts had made maintenance increasingly difficult, but the type continued to be used for advanced training until 1947. A small number of C.200s were also flown by the pro-German National Republican Air Force, based in northern Italy. The latter was only recorded as using the type for a training aircraft but using them for combat operations.

== Variants ==
The Saetta underwent very few modifications during its service life. Aside from the switch to an open canopy, later aircraft were fitted with an upgraded radio and an armoured seat. Some late-production Saettas were built with the MC.202 Serie VII wing, thus adding two 7.7 mm (0.303 in) Breda-SAFAT machine guns to the armament. The four (including two proposed) C.200 derivatives were:

M.C. 200 (prototypes)
Two prototypes fitted with the 623 kW (835 hp) Fiat A.74 R.C.38 radial piston engine.
M.C. 200
Single-seat interceptor fighter, fighter-bomber aircraft. Production version.
M.C.200bis
Breda-proposed modification with a Piaggio P.XIX R.C.45 engine producing 880 kW (1,180 hp) at 4,500 m (14,800 ft). Converted from an early production C.200. First flight 11 April 1942 from Milano-Bresso, flown by Luigi Acerbi. The aircraft was then fitted with a larger propeller and a revised engine cowling. Top speed in trials was 535 km/h (332 mph). It did not enter production, as the C.200 had been replaced by more advanced designs.
M.C.200AS
Version adapted to North African Campaign by the fitting of dust filters. Hard points were introduced in the wing as a field modification which permitted two bombs of up to 352lb (160kg) to be carried. AS stood for Africa Settentrionale ('North Africa').
M.C.200CB
Fighter-bomber (cacciabombardiere) version with 320 kg (710 lb) of bombs or two external fuel tanks (as fighter escort).
M.C.201
As an answer to a 5 January 1938 request by the Regia Aeronautica for a C.200 replacement, Aermacchi proposed the C.201, which had a revised fuselage, a fully enclosed pressurized cabin, and an Isotta Fraschini Astro A.140RC.40 engine (licensed variant of the French Gnome-Rhone Mistral Major GR.14Krs) generating 870 cv (cheval vapeur, or metric horsepower). But later the choice was for the Fiat A.76 R.C.40 engine with 750 kW (1,010 hp). Two prototypes were ordered. The first flew on 10 August 1940, with the less powerful A.74 engine. Although Macchi estimated a top speed of 550 km/h (340 mph) only 312mph was attained on test, work on the two prototypes was cancelled after Fiat abandoned the troublesome A.76 engine.

== Operators ==
Germany

- Luftwaffe operated some captured aircraft.

Kingdom of Italy

- Regia Aeronautica
- Italian Co-Belligerent Air Force

Italy

- Italian Air Force operated some aircraft as trainers until 1947

== Specifications (Macchi C.200 early series) ==
Macchi C.200 Saetta drawing

Data from The Macchi MC.200, The Complete Book of Fighters, Aer. Macchi C.200 Saetta, Aerei militari, Schede tecniche aerei militari italiani e storia degli aviatori

General characteristics

- Crew: 1
- Length: 8.25 m (27 ft 1 in)
- Wingspan: 10.58 m (34 ft 9 in)
- Height: 3.05 m (10 ft 0 in)
- Wing area: 16.82 m^{2} (181.0 sq ft)
- Airfoil: root: NACA 23018 (modified); tip: NACA 23009 (modified)
- Empty weight: 1,964 kg (4,330 lb)
- Gross weight: 2,200 kg (4,850 lb)
- Max takeoff weight: 2,395 kg (5,280 lb)
- Powerplant: 1 × Fiat A.74 R.C.38 14-cylinder air-cooled radial engine, 650 kW (870 hp) at 2,520 rpm for takeoff
- Propellers: 3-bladed variable-pitch propeller

Performance

- Maximum speed: 504 km/h (313 mph, 272 kn) at 4,500 m (14,800 ft)
- Stall speed: 128 km/h (80 mph, 69 kn)
- Range: 570 km (350 mi, 310 nmi)
- Service ceiling: 8,900 m (29,200 ft)
- Rate of climb: 15.3 m/s (3,000 ft/min)
- Time to altitude: 5,000 m (16,000 ft) in 5 minutes 52 seconds
- Wing loading: 131.7 kg/m^{2} (27.0 lb/sq ft)
- Power/mass: 0.286 kW/kg (0.174 hp/lb)
- Take-off run: 260 m (850 ft)
- Landing run: 300 m (980 ft)

Armament

- 2 × 12.7 mm (0.500 in) Breda-SAFAT machine guns, 370 rpg
- Some aircraft were field-modified to carry up to 8 × 15 kg (33 lb), 2 × 50 kg (110 lb), 2 × 100 kg (220 lb) or 2 × 150 kg (330 lb) bombs under the wings

== See also ==
Related development

- Macchi C.202
- Macchi C.205

Aircraft of comparable role, configuration, and era

- Curtiss P-36 Hawk
- Fiat G.50 Freccia
- Grumman F4F Wildcat
- IAR 80
- Mitsubishi A6M Zero
- Nakajima Ki-43
- Reggiane Re.2000
- Seversky P-35
- Weiss Manfréd WM-23 Ezüst Nyíl

Related lists

- List of aircraft of World War II
- List of Regia Aeronautica aircraft used in World War II

== Notes ==
=== Bibliography ===
- Bergström, Christer (2007). Stalingrad – The Air Battle: 1942 through January 1943. Hinckley, UK: Midland. ISBN 978-1-85780-276-4.
- Bergström, Christer; Dikov, Andrey; Antipov, Vlad (2006). Black Cross Red Star – Air War over the Eastern Front Volume 3 – Everything for Stalingrad. Hamilton, MA: Eagle Editions. ISBN 0-9761034-4-3.
- Bignozzi, Giorgio (2000). Aerei d'Italia (in Italian). Milan: Milano Edizioni E.C.A.
- Brindley, John F. (1973). "Caproni Reggiane Re 2001 Falco II, Re 2002 Ariete & Re 2005 Sagittario". Aircraft in Profile. Vol. 13. Berkshire, UK: Profile Publications. ISBN 0-85383-022-3.
- Caruana, Richard J. (1999). Victory in the Air. Malta: Modelaid International Publications. ISBN 1-871767-12-1.
- Cattaneo, Gianni (1997). Aer. Macchi C.200 (Ali d'Italia no. 8) (in Italian) (reprinted 2000 ed.). Torino, Italy: La Bancarella Aeronautica.
- Cattaneo, Gianni (1966). The Macchi MC.200 (Aircraft in Profile number 64). London: Profile Publications.
- Cull, Brian; Galea, Frederick (2008). Gladiators over Malta: The Story of Faith, Hope and Charity. Malta: Wise Owl Publication. ISBN 978-99932-92-78-4.
- De Marchi, Italo; Tonizzo, Pietro (1994). Macchi MC. 200 / FIAT CR. 32 (in Italian). Modena, Italy: Edizioni Stem Mucchi.
- Di Terlizzi, Maurizio (2001). Macchi MC 200 Saetta, pt. 1 (Aviolibri Special 5) (in Italian). Rome: IBN Editore.
- Di Terlizzi, Maurizio (2004). Macchi MC 200 Saetta, pt. 2 (Aviolibri Special 9) (in Italian). Rome: IBN Editore.
- Duma, Antonio (2007). Quelli del Cavallino Rampante – Storia del 4º Stormo Caccia Francesco Baracca (in Italian). Roma: Aeronautica Militare – Ufficio Storico.
- Ethell, Jeffrey L. (1996). Aerei della II Guerra Mondiale (in Italian). Milan: A. Vallardi/Collins Jane's. ISBN 88-11-94026-5.
- Ethell, Jeffrey L. (1995). Aircraft of World War II. Glasgow: HarperCollins/Jane's. ISBN 0-00-470849-0.
- Fernandez, José (June 1993). "Le Macchi MC.200 (2ème partie)". Avions: Toute l'aéronautique et son histoire (in French) (4): 2–4. ISSN 1243-8650.
- Green, William (1975) [1957]. "The Macchi-Castoldi Series". Famous Fighters of the Second World War–2. London: Macdonald. ISBN 0-356-08334-9.
- Green, William; Swanborough, Gordon (2001). The Great Book of Fighters. St. Paul, Minnesota: MBI Publishing. ISBN 0-7603-1194-3.
- Gunston, Bill (1988). The Illustrated Directory of Fighting Aircraft of World War II. London: Salamander Books Limited. ISBN 1-84065-092-3.
- Lawrence, Joseph (1945). The Observer's Book Of Airplanes. London and New York: Frederick Warne & Co.
- Lembo, Daniele (December 2000). "I brutti Anatroccoli della Regia". Aerei Nella Storia (in Italian). No. 26.
- Malizia, Nicola (2006). Aermacchi, Bagliori di guerra (Macchi MC.200 – MC.202 – MC.205/V) (in Italian). Rome, Italy: IBN Editore.
- Marcon, Tullio (May 2000). "Hurricane in Mediterraneo". Storia Militare (in Italian). No. 80.
- Mondey, David (2006). The Hamlyn Concise Guide to Axis Aircraft of World War II. London: Bounty Books. ISBN 0-7537-1460-4.
- Munson, Kenneth (1969). Fighters and Bombers of World War II (First edition 1960 ed.). London: Blandford Press. ISBN 0-907408-37-0.
- Neulen, Hans Werner (2000). In the Skies of Europe. Ramsbury, Marlborough, UK: The Crowood Press. ISBN 1-86126-799-1.
- Palermo, Michele (2014). Eagles over Gazala: Air Battles in North Africa, May–June 1942. Roma: IBN Editore. ISBN 978-88-7565-168-8.
- Sgarlato, Nico (2008). Aermacchi C.202 Folgore (in Italian). Parma, Italy: Delta Editrice.
- Spick, Mike (1997). Allied Fighter Aces of World War II. London: Greenhill Books. ISBN 1-85367-282-3.
