= Mario de Bernardi =

Italian pilot (1893–1959)

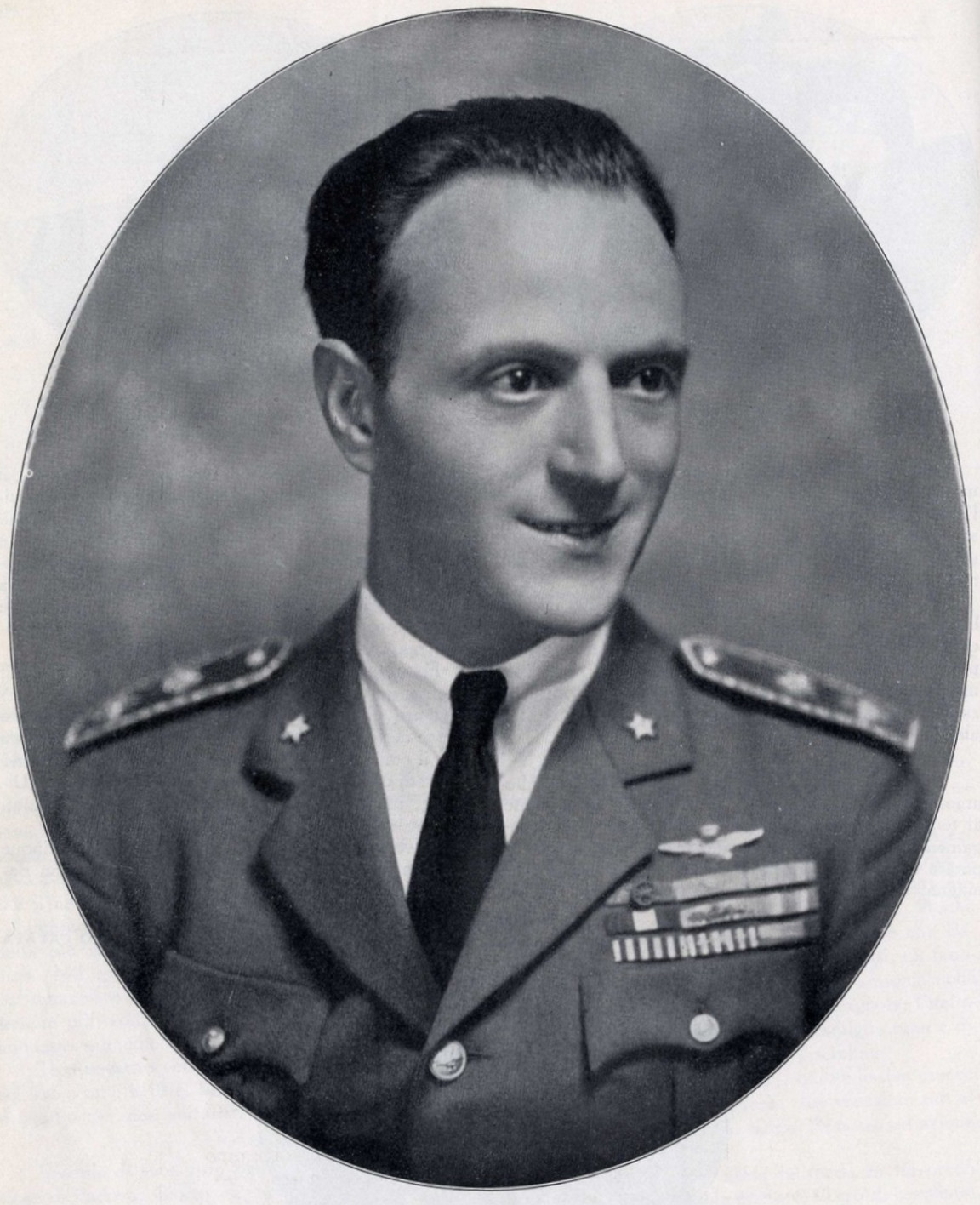
- Mario de Bernardi in 1928
- Born: July 1, 1893; Venosa, Italy
- Died: April 8, 1959 (aged 65); Rome, Italy
- Occupation(s): World War I fighter pilot Air racer Test pilot

Mario de Bernardi (1893–1959) was an Italian World War I fighter pilot, seaplane air racer of the 1920s, and test pilot of early Italian experimental jets.

== Early life ==
De Bernardi was born on 1 July 1893 in Venosa, Italy. In 1911, at the age of 18, he served in the Italian armed forces during the Italo-Turkish War (1911–1912), where he witnessed the first military use of airplanes in combat. He returned to Italy resolved to become a pilot, and he received his pilot's license in 1914.

== Flying achievements ==
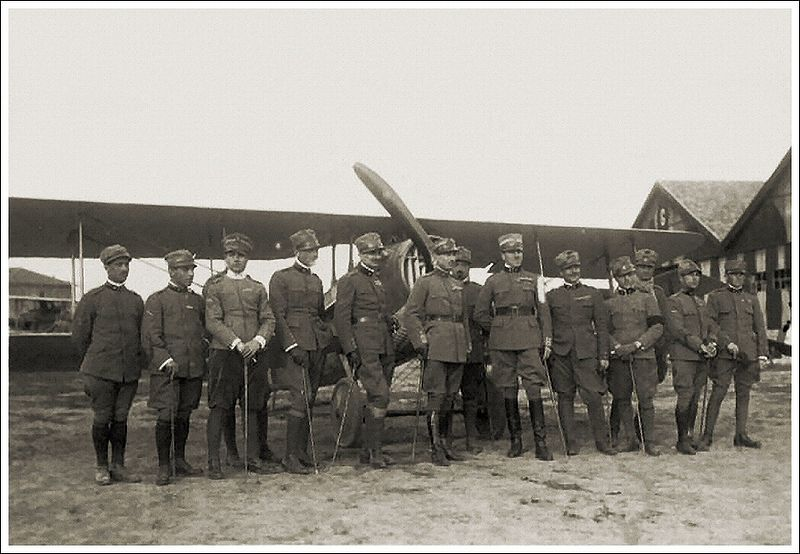
Then-Lieutenant Mario de Bernardi is third from right in this photograph of pilots of the Italian 91st Fighter Squadron during World War I.

=== World War I ===
When Italy entered World War I (1914–1918) on the side of the Allies in 1915, de Bernardi was in the 2nd Regiment of the Piedmont Royal Cavalry. He joined the Italian Air Service and became the first Italian credited with destroying an enemy aircraft in the air when he shot one down over Verona. By the end of the war in November 1918 he had received credit for the destruction of four Austro-Hungarian aircraft with an additional one unconfirmed kill.

De Bernardi later became an aircraft parts inspector and the director of the experimental airfields at Montecelio, Furbara, and Vigna di Valle.

=== Schneider Trophy races and world speed records ===
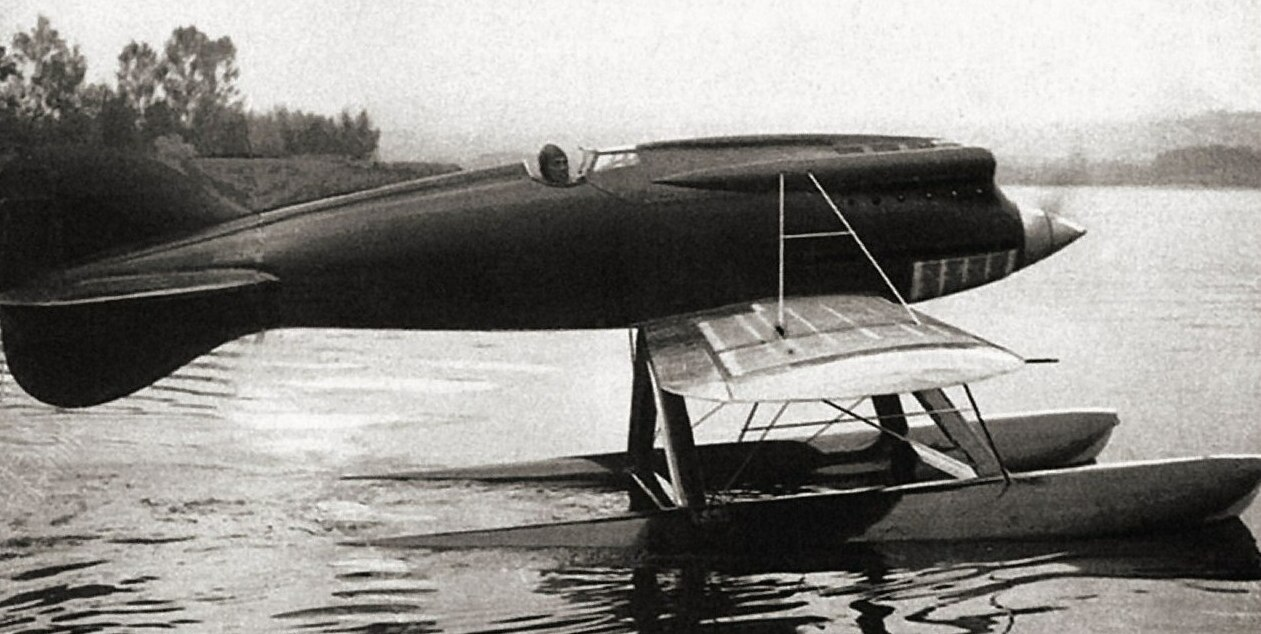
A Macchi M.39 racing seaplane.

After World War I, de Bernardi began racing seaplanes in the international races being held at the time. Perhaps his greatest success in these races came on 13 November 1926, when then-Major de Bernardi, representing Italy, won the Schneider Trophy race at Hampton Roads, Virginia, in the United States. He completed the course in a Macchi M.39 with an average speed of 396.698 kilometres per hour (246.497 mph) on a 350-kilometer (217-mile) circuit; this was a new world speed record for seaplanes. Four days later, on 17 November 1926, he broke his own record, attaining a speed in the same M.39 of 416.618 kilometres per hour (258.874 mph) over a circuit of 3 kilometres (1.9 mi) at Hampton Roads.

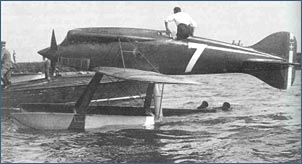
A Macchi M.52 racing seaplane.

On 26 September 1927, de Bernardi again was among the pilots representing Italy in the Schneider Trophy race, this time held in Venice, Italy. Flying a Macchi M.52 racing seaplane, de Bernardi was forced to retire early from the race with engine trouble. However, again flying an M.52, he set a world speed record of 479.290 kilometres per hour (297.817 mph) over a course of 3 kilometres (1.9 mi) on 4 November 1927. He went on to set yet another world speed record on 30 March 1928, flying a Macchi M.52R racing seaplane 512.776 kilometres per hour (318.624 mph) at Venice, becoming both the first person to exceed 500 kilometres per hour (310 mph) and the first person to exceed 300 miles per hour (480 km/h).

=== Later career ===
At the turn of the 1930s de Bernardi joined the Caproni company at Taliedo, near Milan, serving as a test pilot and technical consultant . In 1931 he won the world aerobatics championship at Cleveland, Ohio, in the United States.

In 1933, de Bernardi piloted a Caproni Ca.111 reconnaissance aircraft/light bomber with five passengers on board on a flight of 2,600 kilometres (1,600 mi) from Rome, Italy, to Moscow in the Soviet Union.

In 1939, de Bernardi moved to Rome, where he resided for the rest of his life. In 1940 he began to participate in the development of the first remotely controlled aircraft intended for use as flying bombs.

On 27 August 1940 de Bernardi piloted the Caproni Campini N.1 - sometimes called "Caproni Campini CC.2" - experimental motorjet aircraft on its first flight; the Fédération Aéronautique Internationale considered it the first successful flight of a jet aircraft until news of the August 1939 flight of the German Heinkel He 178 jet later became public. On 30 November 1941 de Bernardi flew an N.1 from Milan to Guidonia Montecelio in about two hours carrying aerograms with canceled postage stamps, becoming the first pilot to carry air mail in a jet aircraft.

De Bernardi designed the M.d.B. 02 Aeroscooter, a two-seat light sport aircraft, whose first flight was in 1957.

== Death ==
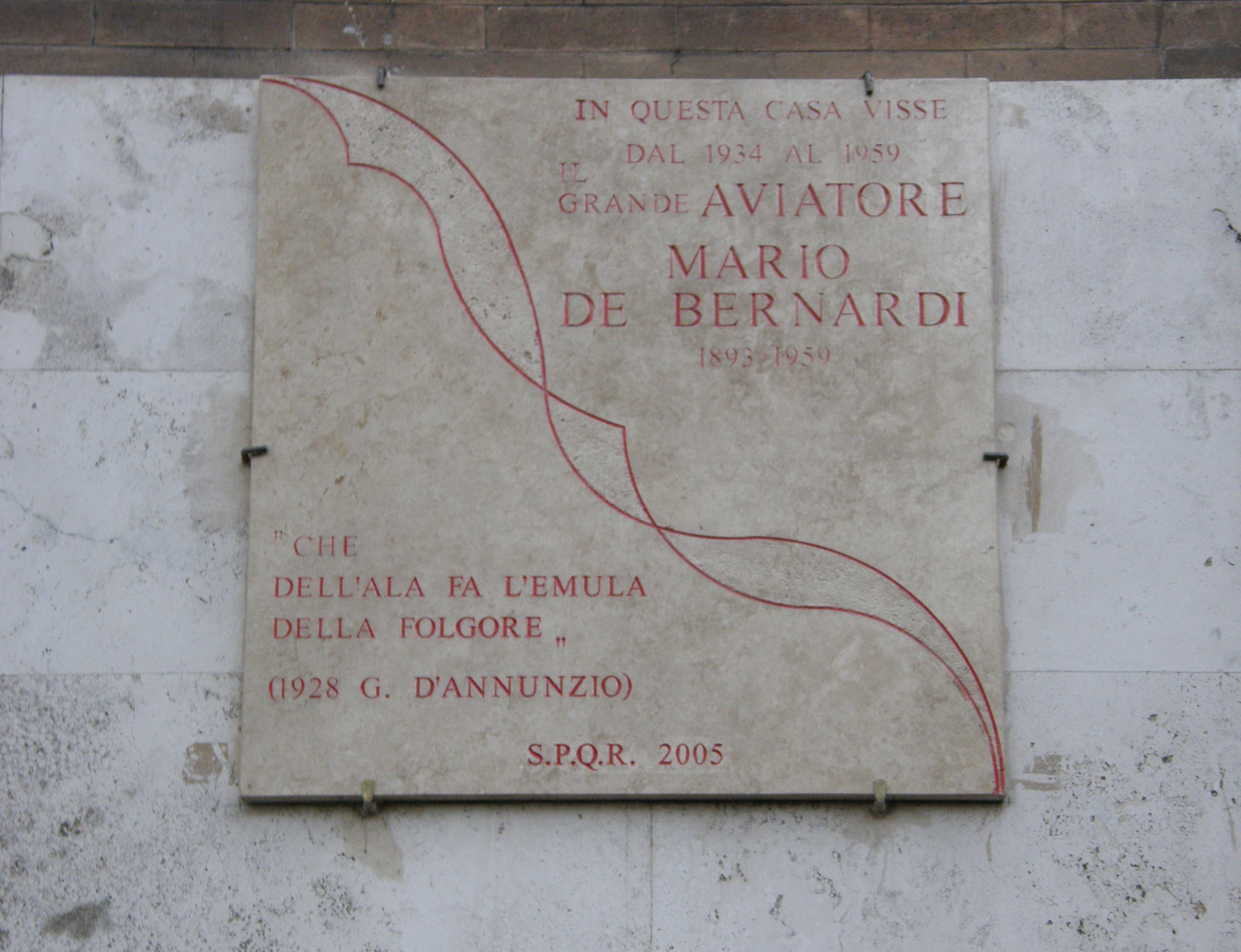
The plaque honoring Mario de Bernardi placed in March 2006 at Via Panama 86, Rome, Italy - his home from 1939 to 1959.

On 8 April 1959 de Bernardi went to a Rome airport to see a German light plane demonstration, and flew his own light plane, showing off his aerobatic skills. While in the air, he began to experience a heart attack. He managed to land the aircraft, only to die minutes later at the age of 65.

== Honors, awards, and commemoration ==
Italian Gold Medal of Valor (Aviation)

In 1926, de Bernardi received the National Trophy - one of the four Harmon Trophies awarded at the time - as Italy's outstanding aviator of that year.

De Bernardi received the Gold Medal of Valor (Aviation), given to "Reward acts of singular courage, skill, and philanthropy committed on board aircraft in flight." De Bernardi's achievements also led the Italian military to name the Italian Air Force's largest base, Pratica di Mare Air Force Base, located southwest of Rome, after him as "Colonello Mario de Bernardi" in 1959.

In March 2006, a plaque honoring de Bernardi was placed at Via Panama 86 - his home from 1939 to 1959 - in Rome as his daughter Fiorenza looked on.
