= Carlo Del Prete =

Italian aviator

- Born: 21 August 1897; Lucca, Italy
- Died: 16 August 1928 (aged 30); Brazil
- Burial place: Italy
- Military career
- Allegiance: Kingdom of Italy
- Branch: Regia Marina (? -1923); Regia Aeronautica (1923-1928)
- Service years: 1916 -1928
- Rank: Maggiore (Major)
- Conflicts: World War I

Carlo Del Prete (21 August 1897 – 16 August 1928) was a pioneer aviator from Italy.

== Early career ==
Born in Lucca, Italy, Del Prete joined the Regia Marina (Italy's Royal Navy) and served aboard submarines during World War I. After the war ended in 1918, he became interested in aviation, and in 1922 he qualified as a pilot. He transferred to the Regia Aeronautica (Italy's Royal Air Force) when it was created in 1923 and earned a reputation as a skilled navigator.

Del Prete met fellow aviator Francesco de Pinedo during their navy service together, and the two became friends. Del Prete helped Pinedo prepare for a six-month Rome-Australia-Tokyo-Rome flight Pinedo made with mechanic Ernesto Campanelli in 1925.

== Record flights ==
=== 1927 "Four Continents" flight ===
In 1927, Del Prete joined Pinedo and mechanic Vitale Zacchetti in flying the Savoia-Marchetti S.55 flying boat Santa Maria under Pinedo's command on the "Four Continents" flight, intended to take them from Italy to Africa and across the Atlantic Ocean to Brazil, followed by several stops in South America and the Caribbean, a tour of the United States and Canada, and a transatlantic flight back to Europe ultimately ending in Rome. Leaving Cagliari, Sardinia, on 13 February 1927, they stopped at Villa Cisneros in Spanish Sahara and Bolama in Portuguese Guinea before attempting to take off from Bolama on 16 February to cross the Atlantic Ocean to Brazil. Sweltering conditions prevented their plane from becoming airborne until they dumped a large quantity of gasoline, forcing them to fly to the Cape Verde Islands instead, where cooler conditions prevailed. On 23 February, they finally made their Atlantic crossing, braving a storm and landing on the ocean near Fernando de Noronha, where the Brazilian Navy protected cruiser Almirante Barroso met them and towed them into port. The next day, after repairs necessitated by a collision with Almirante Barroso, they flew to Natal, Brazil, to begin the South American phase of the flight.

After stops at various cities in South America including Rio de Janeiro, Brazil, Buenos Aires, Argentina, Montevideo, Uruguay, and Asunción, Paraguay, the three Italians began a long leg over the dense jungle of Brazil's Mato Grosso region on 16 March 1927. At one point, a Brazilian river boat had to tow the Santa Maria for 200 miles (320 kilometers) along the Paraguay River in search of a suitable takeoff area after a refueling stop, but on 20 March they completed their crossing of the Mato Grosso and landed at Manaós, Brazil. It was history's first flight over the Mato Grosso.

After a stop at Georgetown, British Guiana, and a crossing of the Caribbean with stops at Pointe-à-Pitre in Guadeloupe, Port-au-Prince in Haiti, and Havana in Cuba, Pinedo, Del Prete, and Zacchetti crossed the Gulf of Mexico and arrived at New Orleans, Louisiana, on 29 March 1927, the first time in history that a foreign airplane had flown into the United States. They then flew through Louisiana, Texas, New Mexico, and Arizona, intending to reach San Diego, California, but during a refueling stop on Theodore Roosevelt Lake in Arizona an accidental fire broke out and destroyed their plane; its engines sank 60 feet (18 meters) to the bottom of the lake and were not recovered until 19 April. The three Italians then flew to San Diego as passengers on a United States Navy plane and traveled by train to New York City, where they arrived on 26 April 1927 to meet a new S.55 shipped there by the Italian Fascist government so that they could continue their flight.

The new plane – identical to the Santa Maria – arrived in New York by ship on 1 May 1927, and, after reassembly, was christened Santa Maria II on 8 May. Following a revised schedule that eliminated all stops west of the Mississippi River, Pinedo, Del Prete, and Zacchetti visited Boston, Massachusetts; Philadelphia, Pennsylvania; Charleston, South Carolina; Pensacola, Florida; and New Orleans before setting out on 14 March 1927 northward up the Mississippi River into the Midwestern United States. They stopped at Memphis, Tennessee, flew over St. Louis, Missouri, and stopped at Chicago, Illinois. They then flew into Canada, stopping at Montreal on 17 March 1927 after an 11-hour flight from Chicago.

Pinedo, Del Prete, and Zacchetti flew on to the Dominion of Newfoundland. On 22 May, they departed Trepassey Bay, planning to cross the Atlantic to the Azores, refuel, and then fly on to Portugal, retracing the transatlantic route of the United States Navy Curtiss NC-4 flying boat in 1919, but they ran low on fuel due to unfavorable weather. Pinedo was forced to land the Santa Maria II on the ocean and be taken under tow by a Portuguese fishing boat and an Italian steamer for the final 200 miles (320 km) to the Azores, where the plane arrived at Horta on May 30.

After a week of repairs, the three Italian aviators were airborne again, flying back to the point in the Atlantic where they had been taken under tow, and then finishing their transatlantic flight from there. After stops in Portugal and Spain, Pinedo, Del Prete, and Zacchetti completed the "Four Continents" flight on 16 June 1927, landing Santa Maria II in Ostia's harbor outside Rome. Their 29,180-mile (46,989-kilometer) flight had taken 123 days.

=== 1928 distance records ===
On 31 May 1928, Arturo Ferrarin and Del Prete – by then a maggiore (major) in the Regia Aeronautica – began a nonstop flight in the Savoia-Marchetti S.64 involving 51 round trips between Torre Flavia (in Ladispoli) and Anzio that broke three world records. When they finally landed on 3 June, they had covered 7,666 km (4,763 mi) – a new world distance record over a closed circuit – and stayed aloft for 58 hours 34 minutes – a new world endurance record. Moreover, they also set the world record for average speed over a distance of 5,000 km (3,100 mi) of 139 km/h (86 mph). With the record attempt successfully concluded, an announcement was made that this was to be a proving exercise for a Rome–New York City transatlantic flight.

The following month Ferrarin and Del Prete did indeed cross the Atlantic in the S.64, not to New York, but across the South Atlantic to Brazil. Departing Montecelio on the evening of 3 July 1928, they flew over Sardinia overnight, and then Gibraltar early the next morning. During 4 July their course covered Casablanca and Villa Cisneros, and by that evening they were over the Cape Verde Islands and headed for Brazil. On the morning of 5 July, they were within radio range of Pernambuco. Crossing the Brazilian coast near Natal, they continued south, hoping to reach Rio de Janeiro. However, poor weather forced the aviators to turn back towards Natal. Now running low on fuel and with the weather still against them, they were forced to abandon landing there as well, since the aerodrome lay behind a row of hills. Instead, they continued north for another 160 km (99 mi) and made a forced landing on a beach at Touros. During the flight from Italy, the S.64 had covered 8,100 km (5,000 mi) in 48 hours, 14 minutes. The Fédération Aéronautique Internationale officially recognised this as a flight of 7,188 km (4,466 mi) – the orthodromic distance between Montecelio and Natal – and a new world straight-line distance record.

A Brazilian mail plane conveyed Ferrarin and Del Prete first to Natal and then to Rio de Janeiro, where in both cities they were given a heroes' welcome. The S.64 suffered structural damage during its landing on the sand, and was brought to Rio de Janeiro by ship. When it arrived in the city, it was donated to Brazil.

== Death ==
The festivities in Rio de Janeiro continued for weeks, but came to an end when Ferrarin and Del Prete crashed during a demonstration flight in a Savoia-Marchetti SM.62 on 8 August 1928. Del Prete died from his injuries five days later in Brazil. He was posthumously awarded the Gold Medal of Aeronautic Valor.

== Memorial in Rio de Janeiro ==
A monument honoring Del Prete and the Savoia-Marchetti S.64's flight was built in the Praça Carlo del Prete in Laranjeiras, Rio de Janeiro, Brazil. It consists of a statue of Del Prete and a 1:2 scale bronze model of the aircraft.
