= Savoia-Marchetti S.64 =

S.64
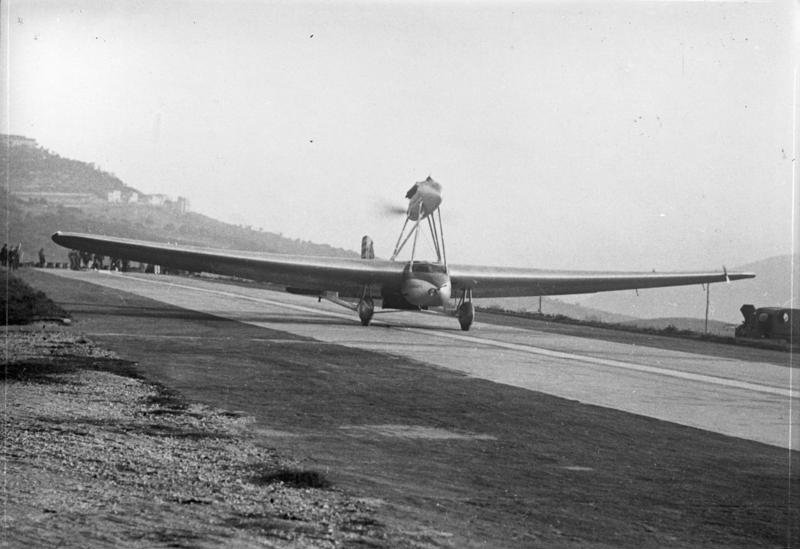
- The first S.64 ready for takeoff on its flying ramp at Guidonia Montecelio, Italy.

General information
- Type: Record-breaking aircraft
- National origin: Italy
- Manufacturer: Savoia-Marchetti
- Number built: 2

History
- First flight: 3 April 1928

The Savoia-Marchetti S.64 was a large monoplane designed and built by the Italian aircraft manufacturer Savoia-Marchetti. It was specifically developed during the late 1920s to contest both the world duration and distance records.

Development of the S.64 was conducted with great secrecy. On 3 April 1928, the S.64 conducted its maiden flight with Alessandro Passeleva and Carlo Del Prete at the controls. It underwent testing at Montecelio, being one of the first Italian aircraft to use a concrete runway. On 31 May 1928, Arturo Ferrarin and Carlo Del Prete broke three world records in the S.64 by making 51 round trips between Torre Flavia (in Ladispoli) and Anzio.

== Design ==
The S.64 was a large monoplane aircraft that was specifically designed to perform long-distance flight. In order to achieve its long range capabilities, the aircraft was designed so that it possessed exceptional fineness. To this end, all structural resistances were minimised by cowlings and streamlined, a process that was aided by extensive wind tunnel testing of scale models. The wing of the S.64 was relatively unburdened by features that would induce eddies and friction. the aircraft featured an unusual pod-and-boom design, the empennage being carried on two open truss structures that extended aft from the wings, broadly similar to the arrangement used on the earlier S.55. The cockpit was located inside the stubby fuselage pod and was fully enclosed.

It had a cantilever single-piece wing that was entirely composed of wood and was relatively thick in the middle and tapered toward the wing tips. The wing was internally divided into several watertight compartments to ensure its flotation in the event of a water landing. Its structure comprised three spars. The wing and the horizontal stabilizer were directly connected via a pair of girders, the upper member of which girder was a sturdy duralumin tube embedded into the wing while the lower member, which terminated forward in a fork, served as a support for the undercarriage. A relatively simplistic undercarriage, consisting of two pairs of vertical struts and a divided axle, had its wheels mounted on ball bearings and surrounded by streamlined cowlings. Furthermore, each girder carried a tail skid which, at the direction of the pilot, could either be set to dig into the ground or travel across it instead; this function could be used to set the start of the aircraft's take-off run.

The powerplant, which was mounted on a set of cabane struts above the wing, was a single Fiat A.22T V-12 water-cooled piston engine that could produce up to 550 HP. at 1,900 rpm. It drove a pusher propeller, the hub of which being fitted with a relatively pointed spinner. The position of this propeller was relatively isolated and free of interferences, enabled it to attain a net propeller efficiency of 0.8. The engine cylinders were not cowled and the exhaust gases escaped directly into the air instead of using an exhaust pipe. The honeycomb-style radiators were fitted beneath and behind the central part of the wing; they were regulated by being raised and drawn inside of the wing. The engine was supported upon a light framework while the propelling force was transmitted to the aircraft via a pair of long oblique struts. The elevated position of the engine necessitated an elaborate tailskid approach to effectively offset it.

Fuel was stored across 27 tanks, composed of duralumin, that had a combined capacity of 7,000 liters (1,849 gallons) and occupied about three-quarters of the length of the wing. The tanks fed into a central tank from where fuel was delivered via pump into the engine; an auxiliary hand pump was also present. A failure of the primary fuel pipe could be mitigated against by use of a reserve fuel pipe, an approach that had been previously used on the Junkers G 31. Furthermore, provisions were made for the rapid discharge of fuel in an emergency situation. The crew actively managed the distribution of the fuel via various fuel cocks and the reserve pump to optimise the aircraft's centre of gravity. Oil was accommodated within a 270-liter (71-gallon) tank that had two transverse partitions. This tank was attached to the front of the engine support, the oil was cooled via the exposure of a portion of the tank to the air. The pilot could regulate the engine oil temperature by varying the proportion of hot and cold oil being emitted, they were guided by a pair of remote thermometers.

The S.64 was provisioned with various pieces of equipment. It had onboard radio apparatus that reportedly had a transmission range in excess of 500 km (311 miles). A high-powered searchlight was also installed in front of the nacelle to facilitate night landings. Navigational instrumentation included three compasses (two were magnetic while the third was an earth inductor compass); gyroscopic indicators of transverse, longitudinal, and directional equilibrium, and a pair of sextants. Multiple of these instruments necessitated the various openings across different parts of the wing. Several Venturi tubes and a windmill of an airspeed indicator were projected front of the nacelle.

== Record flights ==
On 31 May 1928, Arturo Ferrarin and Carlo Del Prete broke three world records in the S.64 by making 51 round trips between Torre Flavia (in Ladispoli) and Anzio. When they landed on 3 June, they had covered 7,666 km (4,791 mi) – a new world distance record over a closed circuit – and stayed aloft for 58 hours and 34 minutes – a new world endurance record. Moreover, they also set the world record for top speed over a distance of 5,000 km (3,110 mi) of 139 km/h (87 mph). With the record attempt successfully concluded, an announcement was made that this was to be a proving exercise for a Rome–New York City transatlantic flight.

The following month Ferrarin and Del Prete did indeed cross the Atlantic in the S.64, not to New York, but across the South Atlantic to Brazil. Departing Montecelio on the evening of 3 July, they flew over Sardinia overnight, and then Gibraltar early the next morning. During 4 July their course covered Casablanca and Villa Cisneros, and by that evening they were over the Cape Verde islands and headed for Brazil. On the morning of 5 July, they were within radio range of Pernambuco. Crossing the Brazilian coast near Natal, they continued south, hoping to reach Rio de Janeiro. However, poor weather forced the aviators to turn back towards Natal. Now running low on fuel and with the weather still against them, they were forced to abandon landing there as well, since the aerodrome lay behind a row of hills. Instead, they continued north for another 160 km (100 mi) and made a forced landing on a beach at Touros. A Brazilian mail plane conveyed Ferrarin and Del Prete first to Natal and then to Rio de Janeiro, where in both cities they were given a heroes' welcome. The S.64 suffered structural damage during its landing on the sand, and was brought to Rio de Janeiro by ship. When it arrived in the city, it was donated to Brazil. During the flight from Italy, the S.64 had covered 8,100 km (5,030 mi) in 48 hours and 14 minutes. The FAI officially recognised this as a flight of 7,188 km (4,500 mi) – the orthodromic distance between Montecelio and Natal – and a new world straight-line distance record. The festivities in Rio de Janeiro continued for weeks, but came to an end when Ferrarin and Del Prete crashed during a demonstration flight in a S.62 on 11 August. Del Prete died from his injuries five days later.

=== S.64bis ===
During 1930, a second, improved S.64, designated the S.64bis, set out to reconquer the duration and closed-circuit distance records that been broken since Ferrarin and Del Prete's flight. Between 30 May and 2 June, Umberto Maddalena and Fausto Cecconi flew from Montecelio in a closed circuit and covered 8,188 km (5,088 mi) in 67 hours and 14 minutes, establishing new distance and duration records. They were preparing to again contest the endurance record in the S.64 when the aircraft crashed into the sea off Pisa on 19 March 1931. Maddalena and Cecconi were both killed, along with their mechanic, Giuseppe Da Monte. The wreckage was too widely dispersed for the cause of the accident to be determined with any certainty, but the Commission of Inquiry suspected that the crankshaft may have broken, causing the propeller to penetrate various parts of the aircraft.

The achievements of Ferrarin and Del Prete, and the S.64, are commemorated in Rio de Janeiro's Praça Carlo Del Prete with a statue of Del Prete and a 1:2 scale bronze model of the aircraft.

== Specifications (S.64) ==
Data from Jane's all the World's Aircraft 1928, Italian Civil and Military Aircraft 1930–1945, Flight 12 July 1928:The Rome–Brazil Non-Stop Flight

General characteristics

- Crew: 2
- Length: 9 m (29 ft 6 in)
- Wingspan: 21.5 m (70 ft 6 in)
- Height: 3.7 m (12 ft 2 in)
- Wing area: 60 m^{2} (650 sq ft)
- Aspect ratio: 7
- Empty weight: 2,400 kg (5,291 lb)
- Gross weight: 7,000 kg (15,432 lb)
- Fuel capacity: 6,500 L (1,700 US gal; 1,400 imp gal)
- Powerplant: 1 × Fiat A.22T V-12 water-cooled piston engine, 440 kW (590 hp)
- Propellers: 2-bladed fixed-pitch pusher propeller

Performance

- Maximum speed: 235 km/h (146 mph, 127 kn) at half load
- Range: 11,500 km (7,100 mi, 6,200 nmi) maximum
- Wing loading: 116 kg/m^{2} (24 lb/sq ft)
- Power/mass: 0.0534 kW/kg (0.0325 hp/lb)
