= Giuseppe Motta (aviator) =

Italian pilot and air racer (died 1929)

- Born: 10 October 1894; Quargnento, Alessandria, Italy
- Died: 22 August 1929 (aged 34); Lake Garda, Italy
- Occupation(s): World War I fighter pilot Air racer Test pilot

Giuseppe Motta (died 1929) was an Italian World War I fighter pilot and seaplane air racer of the 1920s.

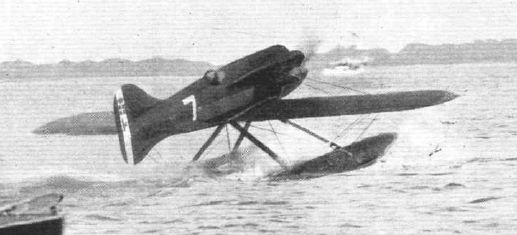
A Macchi M.67 racing seaplane.

After World War I, Motta tested racing seaplanes for the Schneider Trophy race. He was killed during a test flight of the Macchi M.67 after having reached 583 kilometres per hour (362 mph). This world record was held until George Stainforth broke the 400 miles per hour (640 km/h) barrier, on 29 September 1931.
