= Fiat AS.2 =

1920s Italian piston aircraft engine

AS.2
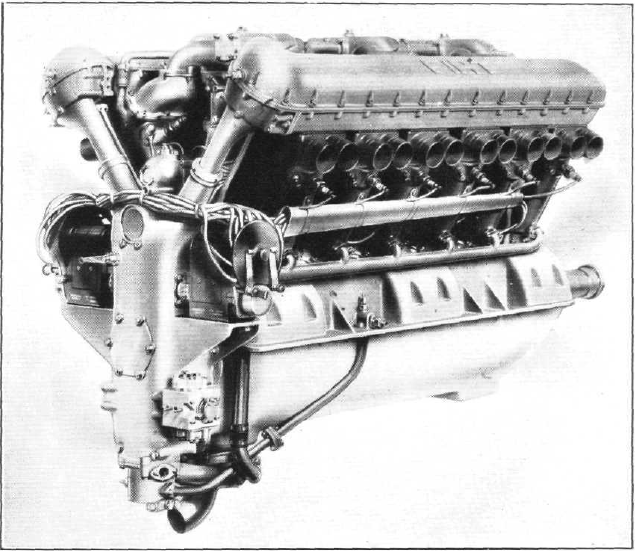
- Type: Piston V-12 aero engine
- Manufacturer: Fiat Aviazione
- First run: c. 1925
- Major applications: Macchi M.39
- Developed from: Fiat A.22
- Developed into: Fiat AS.3

For the aircraft of the same name, see Fiat AS.2 (aircraft)

The Fiat AS.2 was an Italian 12-cylinder, liquid-cooled V engine designed and built in the mid-1920s by Fiat Aviazione especially for the 1926 Schneider Trophy air race.

== Design and development ==
Designed for the 1926 Schneider Trophy contest held at Hampton Roads, Virginia, the AS.2 was inspired by the American Curtiss D-12 engine. Unlike the D-12 the engine featured separate steel cylinders and cast aluminium alloy cylinder heads. The starting point for the Italian engine was the earlier Fiat A.22. The 'S' in AS stood for 'Spinto' (thrust). A weakness of the engine was its magnesium alloy pistons, a new engineering material at the time. Many pistons were holed. Despite the engine's technical problems it was successful at the Schneider Trophy event, winning on 13 November 1926, with a second AS.2 powered aircraft placing third.

== Applications ==
- Macchi M.39

== Specifications (AS.2) ==
Data from Eves

=== General characteristics ===
- Type: 12-cylinder V-engine
- Bore: 140 mm (5.5 in)
- Stroke: 170 mm (6.7 in)
- Displacement: 30.955 litres (1,889 cu in)
- Width: 720 mm
- Height: 850 mm
- Dry weight: 408 kg (900 lb)

=== Components ===
- Valvetrain: Two intake and two exhaust valves per cylinder
- Fuel system: Carburettor
- Cooling system: Liquid-cooled

=== Performance ===
- Power output: 596 kW (800 hp) at 2,500 rpm
- Compression ratio: 6:1
- Power-to-weight ratio: 1.46 kW/kg (0.9 hp/lb)

== See also ==
Comparable engines

- Curtiss D-12
- Fairey Prince (V-12)
- Packard 1A-1500
- Rolls-Royce Kestrel

Related lists

- List of aircraft engines
