= Fiat AS.3 =

1920s Italian piston aircraft engine

AS.3
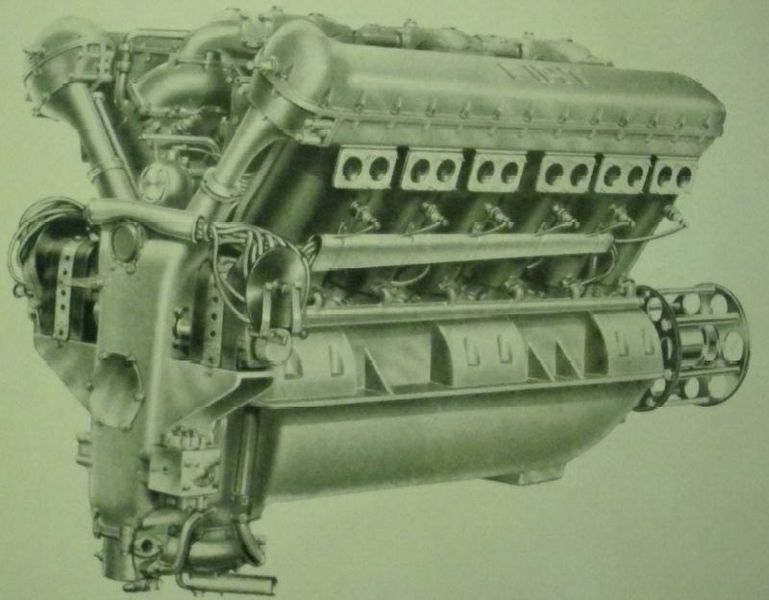
- Type: Piston V-12 aero engine
- Manufacturer: Fiat Aviazione
- First run: c. 1927
- Major applications: Macchi M.52
- Developed from: Fiat AS.2

The Fiat AS.3 was an Italian 12-cylinder, liquid-cooled V engine designed and built in the mid-1920s by Fiat Aviazione especially for the 1927 Schneider Trophy air race.

== Design and development ==
The AS.3 was an increased bore and stroke version of the Fiat AS.2 developed for the 1927 Scheider Trophy seaplane race held at Venice. Despite the increase in capacity the engine retained the same height and frontal area as the AS.2, this was achieved by shortening the connecting rods.

Two AS.3 powered aircraft placed joint second at the 1927 contest, the winning aircraft was a Napier Lion- powered Supermarine S.5. The AS.3 engine was also used at the 1929 competition, again taking second place.

== Applications ==
- Macchi M.52

== Specifications (AS.3) ==
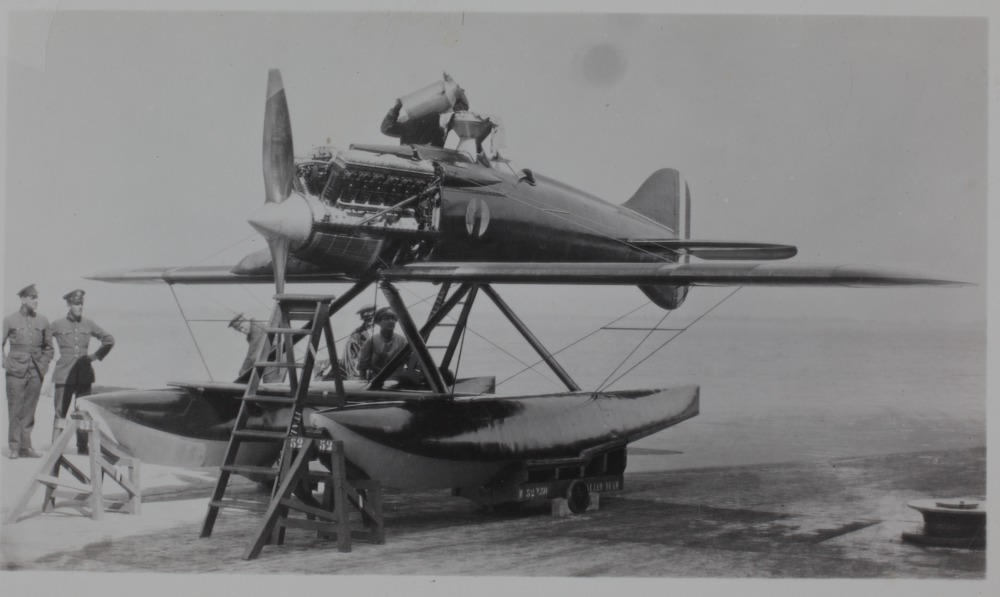
Macchi M.52 with engine cowlings removed

Data from Jane's.

=== General characteristics ===
- Type: 12-cylinder V-engine
- Bore: 145 mm (5.7 in)
- Stroke: 175 mm (6.9 in)
- Displacement: 34.6 L (2,111.4 cu in)
- Width: 720 mm (28.3 in)
- Height: 850 mm (33.5 in)
- Dry weight: 423 kg (933 lb)

=== Components ===
- Valvetrain: Two intake and two exhaust valves per cylinder
- Fuel system: Carburettor
- Fuel type: Straight aviation petrol
- Cooling system: Liquid-cooled

=== Performance ===
- Power output: 746 kW (1,000 hp) at 2,400 rpm
- Compression ratio: 6.7:1
- Power-to-weight ratio: 1.76 kW/kg (1 hp/lb)

== See also ==
Related development

- Fiat AS.2

Comparable engines

- Rolls-Royce Buzzard

Related lists

- List of aircraft engines
