= Macchi M.52 =

Italian racing seaplane

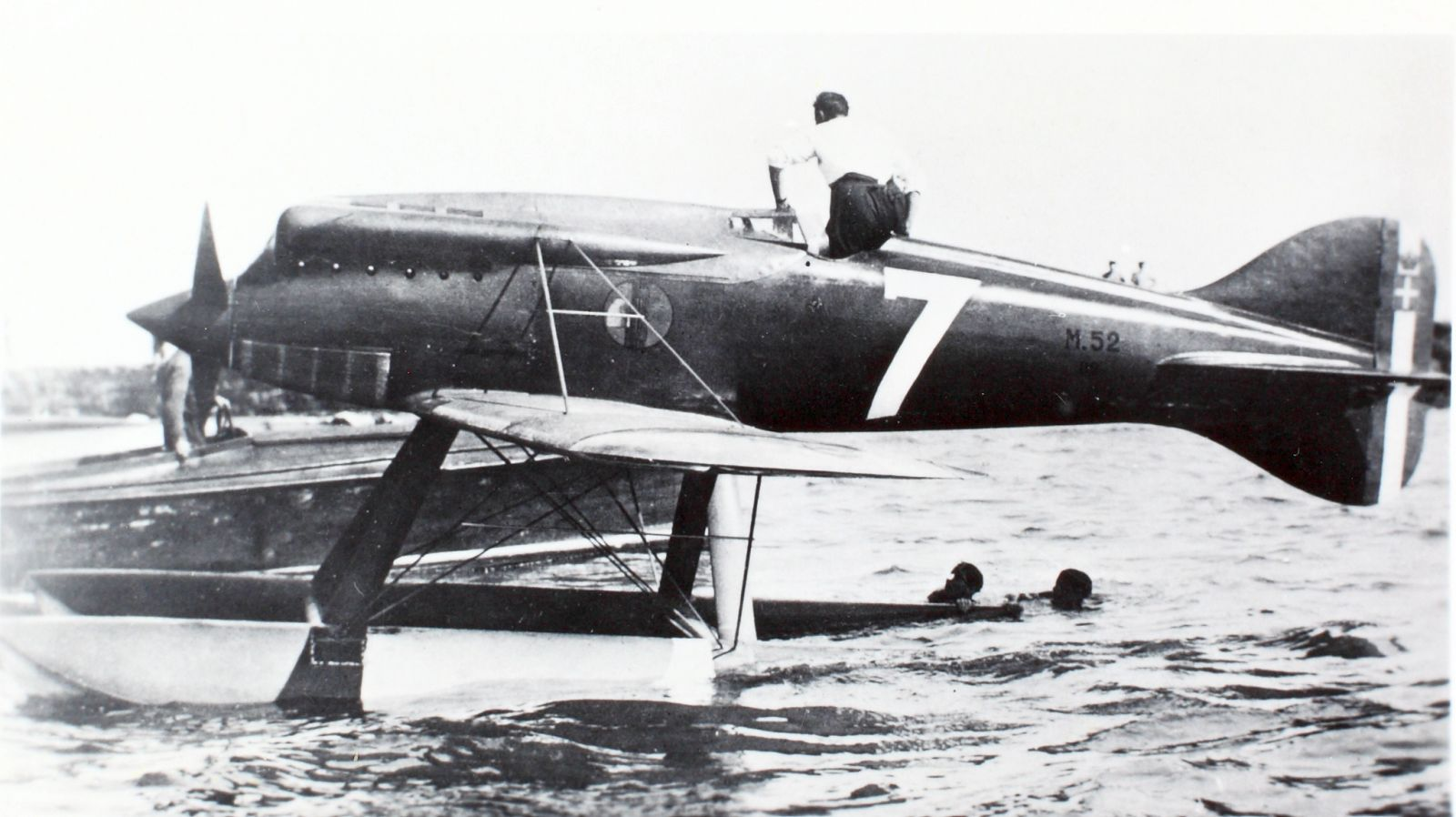

General information
- Type: Racing seaplane
- National origin: Italy
- Manufacturer: Macchi
- Designer: Mario Castoldi
- Number built: 3 (M.52); 1 (M.52bis or M.52R)

History
- First flight: early August 1927

The Macchi M.52 was an Italian racing seaplane designed and built by Macchi for the 1927 Schneider Trophy race. The M.52 and a later variant, the M.52bis or M.52R, both set world speed records for seaplanes.

== Design and development ==
=== M.52 ===
Mario Castoldi (1888–1968) designed the M.52, following the formula he used in designing the successful Macchi M.39, which Major Mario de Bernardi (1893–1959) piloted to victory and a world seaplane speed record in the 1926 Schneider Trophy race and to another world seaplane speed record four days later. Like the M.39, the M.52 was a single-engined, low-wing monoplane on twin floats. Slightly smaller than the M.39, it was powered by a much more powerful engine, the 746 kW (1,000 hp) Fiat AS.3. Despite the significant increase in engine power, the M.52 had a maximum takeoff weight 60 kg (130 lb) less than that of the M.39. Macchi built three M.52s.

=== M.52bis or M.52R ===
A restyled version, known both as the M.52bis and M.52R, was also built. Its wingspan (7.85 metres (25.8 ft)) and maximum takeoff weight were reduced further from that of the M.52, and it had streamlining improvements including floats with a smaller frontal area. Macchi built a single M.52bis.

== Operational history ==
=== M.52 ===
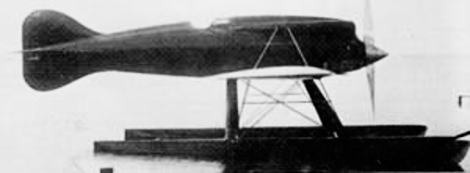

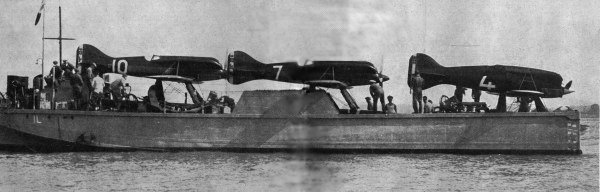
Italy's three entrants in the 1929 Schneider Trophy race. The M52R, which took second place, is at right; the other two aircraft are Macchi M.67 floatplanes.

Italy entered all three M.52s in the 1927 Schneider Trophy race, which was held at Venice, Italy, on 26 September 1927. All three suffered engine trouble, and none of them finished the race; the 1926 winner de Bernardi officially finished 10th after dropping out, and the best result among the M.52s was that achieved by the one piloted by Captain Federico Guazetti, which did not drop out of the race until the final lap. Major de Bernardi, however, used one of the M.52s to establish a new world speed record of 479.3 kilometres per hour (297.8 mph) over a 3-kilometre (1.9 mi) course at Venice on 4 November 1927.

=== M.52bis or M.52R ===
At Venice on 30 March 1928, de Bernardi, flying the lone M.52bis (or M.52R), set a new world speed record of 512.776 kilometres per hour (318.624 mph). De Bernardi thus became both the first person to exceed 300 miles per hour (483 km/h) and the first person to exceed 500 kilometres per hour (310 mph).

Although Italy had planned to enter all three of the later Macchi M.67 racing seaplanes in the 1929 Schneider Trophy race, one of them crashed during training. As a substitute, the M.52R was entered alongside the two surviving M.67s to represent Italy in the race, hosted by the United Kingdom, which took place on 7 September 1929 at Calshot off the Isle of Wight. Flown by Pilot Marshal (Warrant Officer) Tommaso Dal Molin, it was the only one of the three Italian aircraft to finish, gaining second place with a speed of 457.380 km/h (284.20 mph). This was well behind the winner, a British Supermarine S.6 piloted by Richard Waghorn, which set a world speed record of 331.17 miles per hour (532.97 km/h) during one lap of the race and finished with an average speed of 329 miles per hour (529 km/h) over the course of the entire seven-lap race, but the M.52bis's average speed nonetheless was 2.71 miles per hour (4.36 km/h) higher than that of the winner of the previous Schneider Cup race in 1927.

== Operators ==
Kingdom of Italy

- Regia Marina

== Specifications (M.52bis / M.52R) ==
Data from The Complete Encyclopedia of World Aircraft, Velivoli Macchi dal 1912 al 1963

General characteristics

- Crew: 1
- Length: 7.14 m (23 ft 5 in)
- Wingspan: 7.85 m (25 ft 9 in)
- Wing area: 10.2 m^{2} (110 sq ft)
- Empty weight: 1,170 kg (2,579 lb)
- Gross weight: 1,480 kg (3,263 lb)
- Powerplant: 1 × Fiat AS.3 V-12 liquid-cooled piston engine, 746 kW (1,000 hp)
- Propellers: 2-bladed fixed pitch propeller

Performance

- Maximum speed: 512 km/h (318 mph, 276 kn)

== See also ==
- Airspeed record
- Schneider Trophy

Related development

- Macchi M.39
- Macchi M.67

Aircraft of comparable role, configuration, and era

- Gloster IVB
- Supermarine S.5

Related lists

- List of seaplanes and flying boats
