= Mario Castoldi =

Italian aircraft engineer and designer

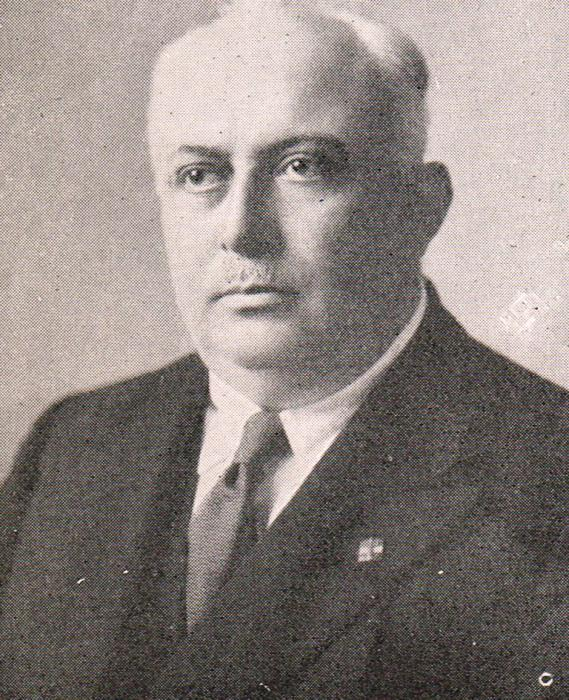
- Mario Castoldi
- Born: 26 February 1888; Zibido San Giacomo, Kingdom of Italy
- Died: 31 May 1968 (aged 80); Trezzano sul Naviglio, Italy
- Education: Polytechnic University of Milan
- Occupations: Aeronautical engineer; aircraft designer
- Known for: Design of Macchi MC.200, Macchi MC.202 and Macchi C.205 fighters
- Military career
- Allegiance: Kingdom of Italy
- Service years: 1915–1918
- Rank: Tenente
- Scientific career
- Fields: Aeronautical engineering Mechanical engineering
- Workplaces: Fabbrica Aeroplani Ing. O. Pomilio; Aermacchi

Mario Castoldi (February 26, 1888 – May 31, 1968) was an Italian aircraft engineer and designer.

== Biography ==
Born in Zibido San Giacomo, Province of Milan, Castoldi worked for the experimental center of Italian Military Aviation at Montecelio, not far from Rome.

In 1922, he moved to Macchi Aeronautica, where he became famous for designing a series of seaplanes that set world speed records. His first winning plane was the Macchi M.39 seaplane. It was designed in 1925–26 to compete in the Schneider Trophy race of 1926. Powered (like all the Macchi planes from this time) by a Fiat engine, it managed a top speed of 396 km/h (246 mph) and won the contest for that year.

For the next four years, Castoldi designed several more racing seaplanes (the M.52, M.52R, and the M.67), which entered the Schneider Trophy races but they lost to the British racers (the Supermarine S.5, and the Supermarine S.6). Castoldi's most famous plane was the Macchi M.C.72 (designed over three years, from 1931 to 1933). At first, Castoldi hoped this plane would enter (and win) the Schneider Trophy race of 1931, but the plane could not be ready in time for that contest (the winner was the British Supermarine S.6B). As a result of three consecutive victories for the British, the Schneider races were over.

Development on the M.C.72 continued. Jane asserts that the Italian dictator Benito Mussolini personally supported the M.C.72 program (most likely as a part of his efforts to gain international prestige for Italy). After the deaths of two test pilots who were flying the plane, in April 1933, pilot Francesco Agello succeeded in setting a speed record for a seaplane with a speed of 684 km/h. Work on improving the plane's speed continued as the design team hoped they could exceed a speed of 700 km/h. After a year and a half, this feat was accomplished by Agello, who attained an average speed of 709 km/h (440 mph) flying the three passes in M.C.72 on October 23, 1934. This world speed record lasted for five years, but as a record for a piston-engine seaplane, it has never been broken.

After the M.C.72, Castoldi worked on designs for Italian fighters. However, he was limited by the inability of Fiat to provide more powerful engines. Later designs had to rely on German-supplied engines. Castoldi was in charge of the design of a series of military fighters that formed the mainstay of the Italian fighter force in World War II, specifically the C.200, C.202 and Macchi C.205.

In 1945, Castoldi retreated to private life. He died at Trezzano sul Naviglio in 1968.
