= Macchi M.39 =

Racing seaplane

M.39
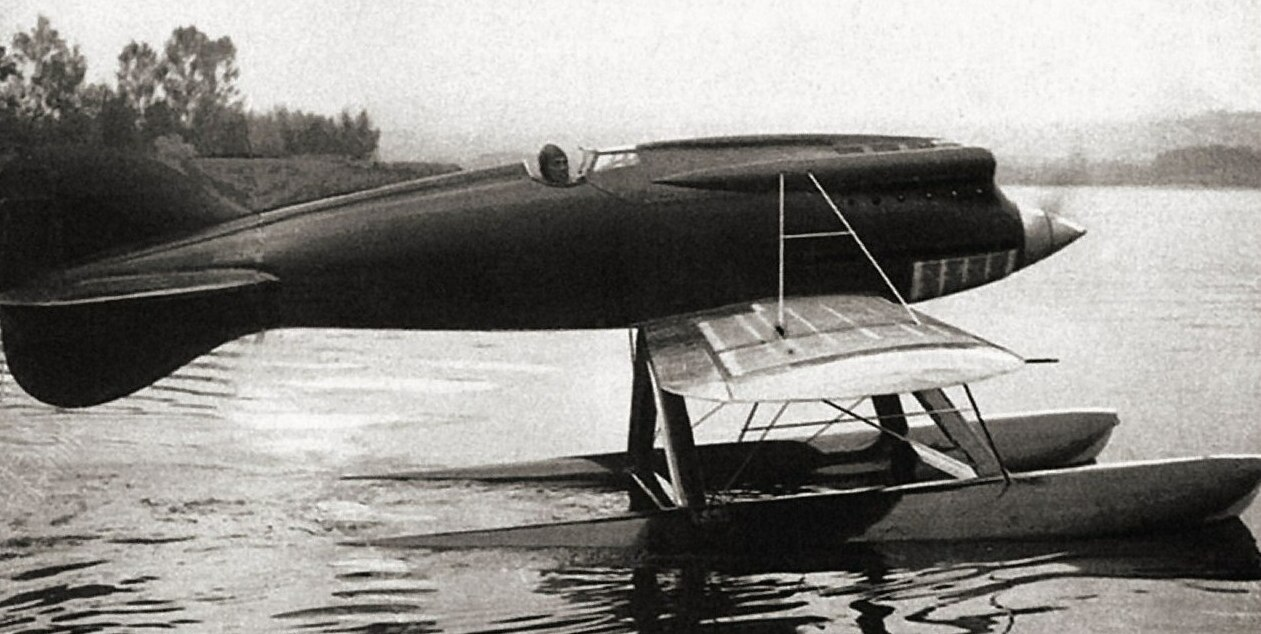

General information
- Type: Racing seaplane
- Manufacturer: Aeronautica Macchi
- Designer: Mario Castoldi
- Primary user: Regia Aeronautica
- Number built: Five (two trainers and three racers), plus one static-test airframe

History
- First flight: 6 July 1926

The Macchi M.39 was a racing seaplane designed and built by the Italian aircraft manufacturer Aeronautica Macchi. The type is most remembered for its settings of multiple world speed records during the mid-1920s, as well as for winning the Schneider Trophy, for which the M.39 had been specifically developed.

Designed by Mario Castoldi and constructed in Varese, north-western Lombardy, the M.39 was a considerable departure from the company's preceding racing flying boat, the Macchi M.33. It was a single-seat twin-float seaplane with an open cockpit, tightly-braced monoplane wing, and a streamlined fuselage. Two-thirds of the wing's upper surfaces functioned as surface radiators, providing relatively low drag cooling for the engine. It was powered by a Fiat AS.2 V-12 piston engine with an exceptionally high power-to-weight ratio for the era.

Two versions of the M.39, a trainer version and a racer, were produced. On 6 July 1926, the first aircraft, the trainer model MM.72, performed the type's maiden flight. On 13 November 1926, three M.39s participated in the 1926 Schneider Trophy contest, held at Hampton Roads, Virginia, in the United States; one aircraft, MM.76, piloted by Mario de Bernardi, took first place with an average speed of 396.698 kilometres per hour (246.497 mph), setting a new world speed record for seaplanes, while MM.74, flown by Adriano Bacula, came in third place.

== Design and development ==
The M.39 was designed by the Italian aeronautical engineer Mario Castoldi to represent Italy in the 1926 Schneider Trophy competition. It represented a considerable departure from his prior designs, being the first low-wing monoplane that Castoldi would design for Macchi, virtually nothing of the company's preceding racing flying boat, the Macchi M.33, was present in its design. It had been determined that the prior aircraft's basic configuration, which was built around a central hull, while affording great stability upon the water, would unavoidably present a great obstacle to penetration and thus was substituted for a pair of braced floats that formed a rigid support. Construction of the aircraft was performed at the company's factory in Varese, north-western Lombardy.

It was a single-seat twin-float seaplane of mixed (metal and wooden) construction. The pilot sat in an open cockpit above the trailing edge of the wing; the cockpit's windscreen was profiled into the fuselage decking to reduce drag. This fuselage was streamlined and intentionally avoided angularity. The horizontal empennage consisted of a sizable stabiliser and an unbalanced two-part elevator while the vertical empennage consisted of two fins, one above and one below the fuselage, and an unbalanced rudder, lacking any external bracing.

The monoplane wing, which was situated underneath the fuselage, was rigidly braced using steel cables. One feature of particular note about these wings, which were composed of wood, was that two-thirds of the wing's upper surfaces functioned as low drag surface radiators. The adoption of such a radiator arrangement, which avoided the drag that would have otherwise been generated through the use of traditional honeycomb or fin-type radiators, was considered to be a key innovation of the aircraft. The oil radiator was incorporated in the bottom of the fuselage in a relatively exposed position to achieve effective cooling.

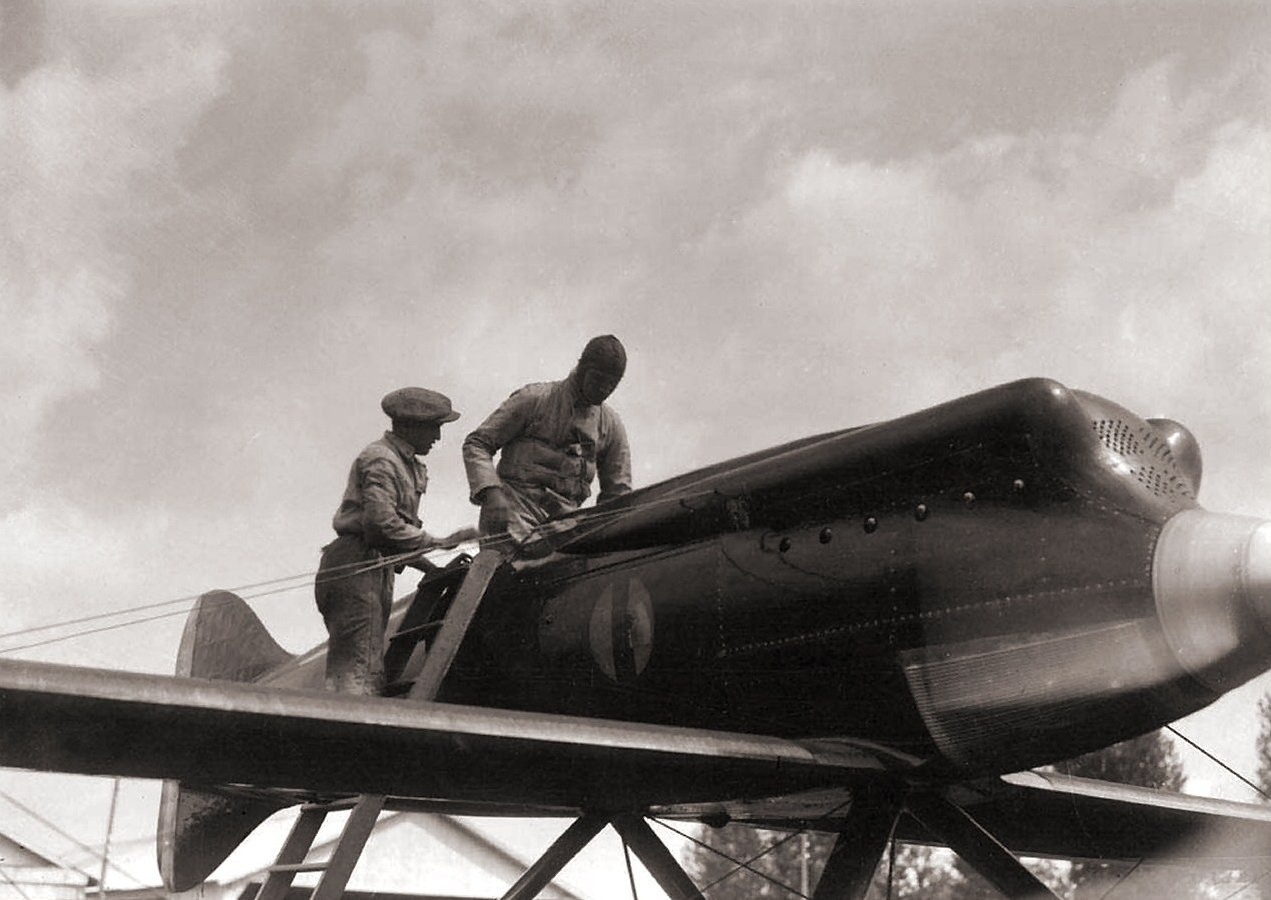
An M.39 undergoing engine tests, c. 1926

The M.39 was powered by a Fiat AS.2 water-cooled V-12 piston engine, which was directly drove the propeller. This engine, which was installed within the aircraft's nose, was equipped with three double carburetors, one for every four cylinders, that were specifically designed as to enable them to operate normally at practically any orientation of the aircraft. The power-to-weight ratio achieved by this engine, inclusive of the water in the cylinder jackets and tubing, the residual oil, the starter apparatus and the fuel pump, was exceptionally low (467 grams (1.03 lb.) per hp); it was reportedly lighter that any other powerplant in its power range in production with any other manufacturer in the world at that time.

The M.39 was specifically built to compete for the Schneider Trophy; accordingly, its design had specialised features to aid it in this exact purpose. As the course circuit required left turns, the left wing of the aircraft had a slightly greater span than the right wing, which permitted the aircraft to make tighter left-hand turns. To counteract propeller torque reaction, the floats had unequal buoyancy. Furthermore, fuel was stored within these floats.

Macchi produced two versions of the M.39, a trainer version and a racer. The trainer version had an increased wingspan of 10.23 metres (33 ft 7in) -compared to the 9.26m (30 ft 4.5in) of the racers- and was powered by a 447-kilowatt (600-horsepower) Fiat AS.2 liquid-cooled V12 engine, while the racing version had a 597-kilowatt (800-horsepower) Fiat AS.2. Macchi built two trainers, three racers, and one non-flying static-test airframe. The first M.39, a trainer with serial number MM.72, was built in only a few months. It was soon followed by the second trainer (MM.73), the three racers (MM.74, MM.75, and MM.76), and the static-test airframe.

== Operational history ==
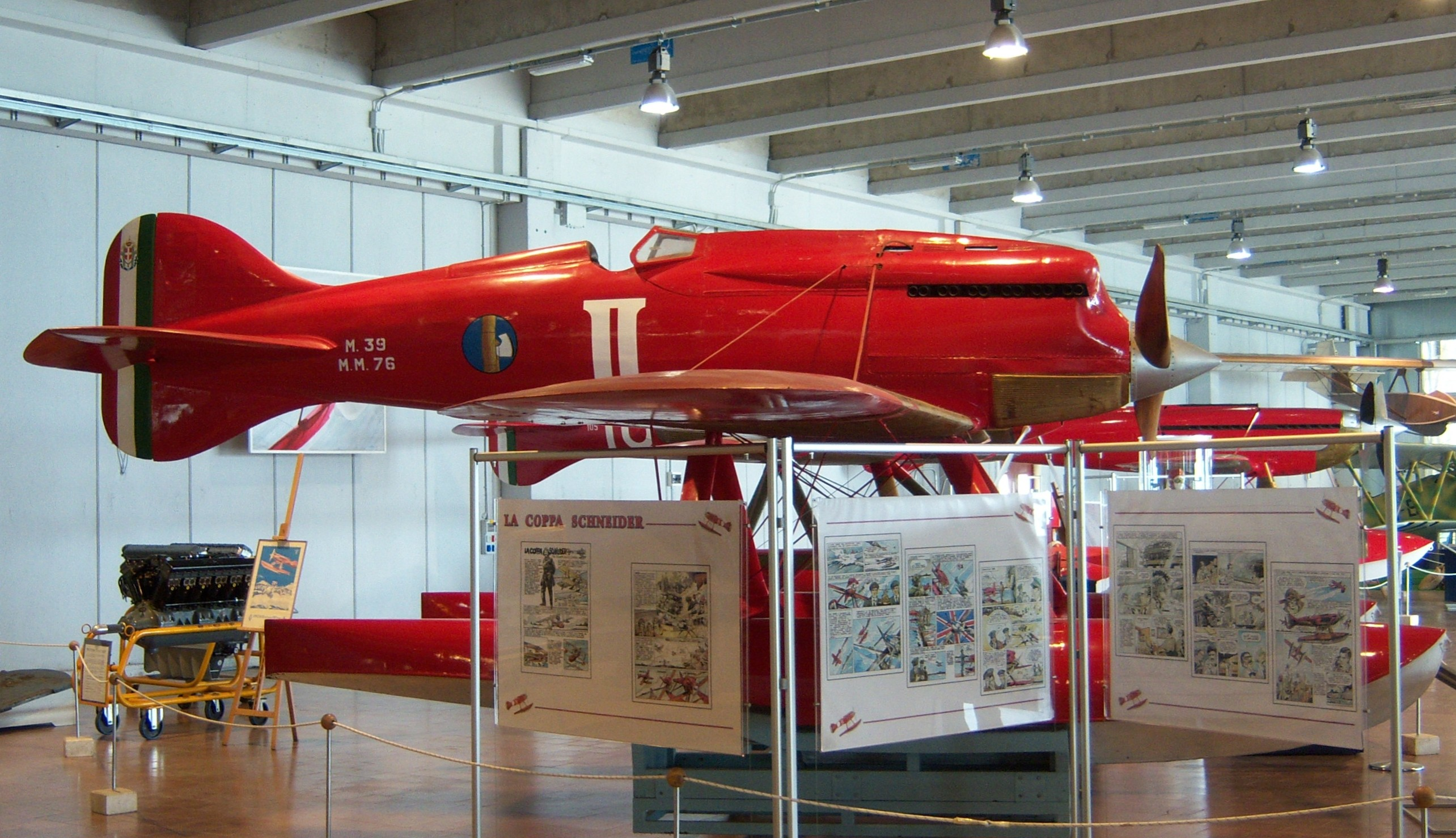

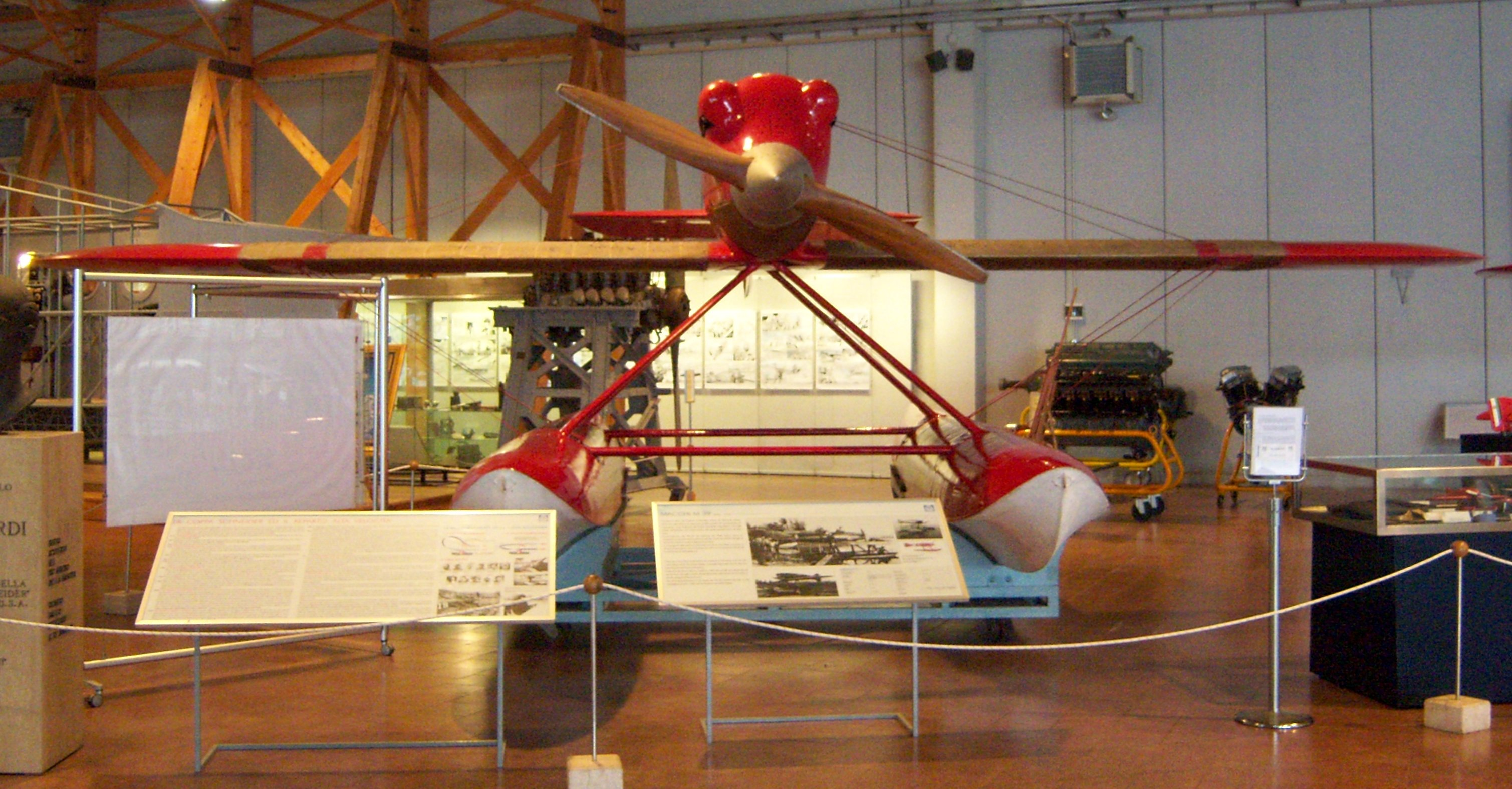
Preserved Macchi M.39 in Italy at the Museo storico dell'Aeronautica Militare di Vigna di Valle, photographed on 6 June 2009. This aircraft, MM.76, piloted by Major Mario de Bernardi, won the 1926 Schneider Trophy race and set two world speed records that year.

On 6 July 1926, the trainer MM.72 performed its maiden flight, becoming the first M.39 to fly. On 16 September 1926, the Italian Schneider team captain was killed when the MM.72 trainer that he was flying stalled over Lake Varese and plunged into the lake itself. Development of the M.39 proceeded undaunted.

On 13 November 1926, the three M.39 racers took part in the 1926 Schneider Trophy contest at Hampton Roads, Virginia, in the United States. MM.75 suffered a burst pipe and had to leave the race early, but MM.76, piloted by Mario de Bernardi, took first place with an average speed of 396.698 kilometres per hour (246.497 mph), setting a new world speed record for seaplanes. MM.74, flown by Adriano Bacula, came in third place.

Four days later, on 17 November 1926, de Bernardi used MM.76 to achieve a new world speed record of 416.618 kilometres per hour (258.874 mph) over a 3 kilometres (1.9 mi) course at Hampton Roads.

Castoldi based the design of his next racing seaplane, the Macchi M.52, on that of the M.39.

== Surviving aircraft ==
MM76, the aircraft flown by de Bernadi to win the Schneider Trophy and set a new world speed record, is on display in the Museo Storico Aeronautica Militare in Bracciano.

== Operators ==
Kingdom of Italy

- Regia Aeronautica

== Specifications (M.39 racer) ==
Macchi M.39

Data from World Encyclopedia of Civil Aircraft, The Complete Encyclopedia of World Aircraft

General characteristics

- Crew: 1
- Length: 7.77 m (25 ft 6 in) including floats

6.73 m (22.1 ft) fuselage length

- Wingspan: 9.26 m (30 ft 5 in)
- Height: 2.97 m (9 ft 9 in)
- Empty weight: 1,257 kg (2,771 lb)
- Gross weight: 1,572 kg (3,466 lb)
- Max takeoff weight: 1,575 kg (3,472 lb)
- Powerplant: 1 × Fiat AS.2 V-12 liquid-cooled piston engine, 597 kW (801 hp)
- Propellers: 2-bladed fixed-pitch propeller

Performance

- Maximum speed: 439.44 km/h (273.06 mph, 237.28 kn)

== See also ==
Related development

- Macchi M.52
- Macchi M.67

Aircraft of comparable role, configuration, and era

- Curtiss CR-3

Related lists

- List of seaplanes and flying boats
