= List of Schneider Trophy aircraft =

Racing seaplanes from 1913 to 1931

Schneider Trophy aircraft racing seaplanes which contested for the Schneider Trophy between 1913 and 1931.

List Of Schneider Trophy Aircraft
Year and Race No.	Country	Aircraft Registration/serial (Note: Early aircraft lacked registrations or serial numbers US Navy serial numbers begin with A RAF serial numbers being with either N or S Regia Aeronautica serial numbers begin with M.M. French military serials numbers do not appear to have been recorded Civil registrations begin with G-, F-, I- or NX)	Image	Power and Engine type	Results	Average Speed	Notes and References
1913; 4	France	Borel hydro-monoplane		60 kW (80 hp); Gnome Lambda	Crashed during trials	n/a	
1913; 19	France	Deperdussin Coupe Schneider		120 kW (160 hp); Gnome Lambda-Lambda	First	73.6 km/h 45.7 mph	
1913; 2	France	Morane-Saulnier G		60 kW (80 hp); Gnome Lambda	Second	92 km/h 57 mph	
1913; 5	France	Nieuport IV.H		74.6 kW (100.0 hp); Gnome Omega-Omega	Retired mid race	n/a	
1913; 6	France	Nieuport IV.H		74.6 kW (100.0 hp); Gnome Omega-Omega	Retired mid race	n/a	
1914 n/a	France	Deperdussin Coupe Schneider		120 kW (160 hp); Le Rhône 18E (1912)	Retired mid race	n/a	
1914 n/a	France	Deperdussin Coupe Schneider		150 kW (200 hp); Gnome Delta-Delta	Retired mid race	n/a	
1914; 7	Switzerland	FBA Type A		74.6 kW (100.0 hp); Gnome Monosoupape	Second	82.35 km/h 51.17 mph	
1914; 5	France	Nieuport VI.H		120 kW (160 hp); Gnome Lambda-Lambda	Retired mid race	n/a	
1914; 6	France	Nieuport VI.H		120 kW (160 hp); Gnome Lambda-Lambda	Retired mid race	n/a	
1914; 4	Great Britain	Sopwith Tabloid		75 kW (100 hp); Gnome Monosoupape	First	139.66 km/h 86.78 mph	
1915-1918	No races were run during World War I.						
1919 n/a	Great Britain	Avro 539; G-EALG		340 kW (450 hp); Napier Lion	Eliminated during trials	n/a	
1919; 1	Great Britain	Fairey III; G-EALQ		340 kW (450 hp); Napier Lion	Retired mid race	n/a	
1919; 2	France	Nieuport-Delage NiD.29SHV		220 kW (300 hp); Hispano-Suiza 8Fb	Withdrew before race	n/a	
1919; 7	Italy	SIAI/Savoia S.13		190 kW (250 hp); Isotta Fraschini V.6	Disqualified after race	n/a	
1919; 3	Great Britain	Sopwith Schneider; G-EAKI		340 kW (450 hp); Cosmos/Bristol Jupiter	Retired mid race	n/a	
1919; 6	France	SPAD S.26		250 kW (340 hp); Hispano Suiza 8F	Sank during race trials	n/a	
1919; 5	Great Britain	Supermarine Sea Lion I G-EALP		340 kW (450 hp); Napier Lion	Retired mid race	n/a	
1920; 7	Italy	SIAI/Savoia S.12; 30011		410 kW (550 hp); Ansaldo 4E.29	First	172.56 km/h 107.22 mph	
1920 n/a	Italy	SIAI/Savoia S.19		410 kW (550 hp); Ansaldo E.28	Failed to qualify	n/a	
1921; 11	France	Latham L.1; F-ESEJ		2 x 300 kW (400 hp); Lorraine 12D	Withdrew before start of race	n/a	
1921; 1	Italy	Macchi M.7bis		190 kW (250 hp); Isotta Fraschini V.6	First	189.68 km/h 117.86 mph	
1921; 14	Italy	Macchi M.7bis		190 kW (250 hp); Isotta Fraschini V.6	Retired mid race	n/a	
1921; 4	Italy	Macchi M.19; M.M.3098		480 kW (640 hp); Fiat A.14	Retired mid race	n/a	
1921 ?	France	Nieuport-Delage NiD.29SHV		220 kW (300 hp); Hispano-Suiza 8Fb	Withdrew before race	n/a	
1922; 12	France	CAMS 36; F-ESFA		224 kW (300 hp); Hispano-Suiza 8Fd	Withdrew before race	n/a	
1922; 9	Italy	Macchi M.17; I-BAHG		190 kW (250 hp); Isotta Fraschini V.6	Third	213.63 km/h 132.74 mph	
1922; 10	Italy	Macchi M.17; I-BAFV		190 kW (250 hp); Isotta Fraschini V.6	Fourth	199.61 km/h 124.03 mph	
1922; 8	Italy	SIAI/Savoia S.51; I-BAIU		220 kW (300 hp); Hispano-Suiza 8F	Second	230.93 km/h 143.49 mph	
1922; 14	Great Britain	Supermarine Sea Lion II; G-EBAH		340 kW (450 hp); Napier Lion	First	234.52 km/h 145.72 mph	(Note: Last flying boat to win.)
1923; 6	Great Britain	Blackburn Pellet; G-EBHF		340 kW (450 hp); Napier Lion	Crashed during trials	n/a	
1923; 10	France	CAMS 36bis F-ESFC		268 kW (359 hp); Hispano-Suiza 8Fd	Damaged before race	n/a	
1923; 9	France	CAMS 38; F-ESFD		280 kW (380 hp); Hispano-Suiza 12Fd	Retired mid race	n/a	
1923; 4	United States	Curtiss CR-3; A6081		354 kW (475 hp); Curtiss D-12	First	285.46 km/h 177.38 mph	
1923; 3	United States	Curtiss CR-3; A6080		354 kW (475 hp); Curtiss D-12	Second	278.97 km/h 173.34 mph	
1923; 7	Great Britain	Supermarine Sea Lion III; G-EBAH		391 kW (525 hp); Napier Lion III	Third	252.93 km/h 157.16 mph	
1923; 5	United States	Navy-Wright NW-2; A6544		520 kW (700 hp); Wright T-3	Damaged during trials	n/a	
1924	No races were run during 1924.						
1924 n/a	France	Blanchard BB-1		280 kW (380 hp); Gnome et Rhône 9A Jupiter	Withdrew before trials	n/a	
1924 n/a	Great Britain	Gloster II; J7505		436 kW (585 hp); Napier Lion VA	Crashed before trials	n/a	
1925; 3	United States	Curtiss R3C-2; A7054		421 kW (565 hp); Curtiss D-12	First	374.27 km/h 232.56 mph	(Note: Last biplane to win.)
1925; 2	United States	Curtiss R3C-2; A6979		421 kW (565 hp); Curtiss D-12	Retired mid race	n/a	
1925; 1	United States	Curtiss R3C-2; A6978		421 kW (565 hp); Curtiss D-12	Retired mid race	n/a	
1925; 5	Great Britain	Gloster IIIA; N194		520 kW (700 hp); Napier Lion VII	Second	320.58 km/h 199.20 mph	
1925; 7	Italy	Macchi M.33; M.M.49		378 kW (507 hp); Curtiss D-12A	Third	271.08 km/h 168.44 mph	
1925; 6	Italy	Macchi M.33; M.M.48		378 kW (507 hp); Curtiss D-12A	Retired mid race	n/a	
1925 n/a	Great Britain	Supermarine S.4; G-EBLP/N197		510 kW (680 hp); Napier Lion VII	Crashed before race	n/a	(Note: Achieved 381 km/h (237 mph) before crashing.)
1926; 2	United States	Curtiss F6C-1 Hawk; A7128		378 kW (507 hp); Curtiss D-12A	Fourth	220.41 km/h 136.96 mph	
1926; 6	United States	Curtiss R3C-2; A7054		421 kW (565 hp); Curtiss D-12	Second	372.34 km/h 231.36 mph	
1926; 4	United States	Curtiss R3C-4; A6979		511 kW (685 hp); Curtiss D-12	Retired mid race	n/a	(Note: Maximum speed attained was 390 km/h (240 mph).)
1926; 5	Italy	Macchi M.39; M.M.76		600 kW (800 hp); Fiat AS.2	First	396.70 km/h 246.50 mph	
1926; 1	Italy	Macchi M.39; M.M.74		600 kW (800 hp); Fiat AS.2	Third	350.85 km/h 218.01 mph	
1926; 3	Italy	Macchi M.39; M.M.75		600 kW (800 hp); Fiat AS.2	Retired mid race	n/a	
1927; 1	Great Britain	Gloster IVB; N223		652 kW (875 hp); Napier Lion VIIB	Retired mid race	n/a	(Note: Maximum speed calculated at 445 km/h (277 mph).)
1927 n/a	United States	Kirkham-Williams X NX648		930 kW (1,250 hp); Packard X-2775	Withdrew before race	n/a	
1927; 5	Italy	Macchi M.52; M.M.80 or 81		600 kW (800 hp); Fiat AS.2	Retired mid race	n/a	
1927; 2	Italy	Macchi M.52; M.M.80 or 81		750 kW (1,010 hp); Fiat AS.3	Retired mid race	n/a	
1927; 7	Italy	Macchi M.52; M.M.82		750 kW (1,010 hp); Fiat AS.3	Retired mid race	n/a	
1927 ?	Great Britain	Short Crusader; N226		650 kW (870 hp); Bristol Mercury	Crashed during trials	n/a	
1927; 6	Great Britain	Supermarine S.5; N219		670 kW (900 hp); Napier Lion VIIA	Second	439.45 km/h 273.06 mph	
1927; 4	Great Britain	Supermarine S.5; N220		652 kW (875 hp); Napier Lion VIIB	First	453.28 km/h 281.66 mph	
1928	No races were run during 1928.						
1929 n/a	France	Bernard H.V.40		746 kW (1,000 hp); Gnome-Rhône 9Kfr Mistral	Withdrew before trials	n/a	
1929 n/a	France	Bernard H.V.41		746 kW (1,000 hp); Hispano-Suiza 12Ns	Withdrew before trials	n/a	
1929; 1	Great Britain	Gloster VIB; N249		980 kW (1,320 hp); Napier Lion VIID	Failed to qualify	n/a	
1929; 4	Italy	Macchi M.52bis/M.52R; M.M.83		750 kW (1,010 hp); Fiat AS.3	Second	457.38 km/h 284.20 mph	
1929; 7	Italy	Macchi M.67; M.M.105		1,300 kW (1,700 hp); Isotta Fraschini Asso 2-800	Retired mid race	n/a	(Note: Engine output closer to 1,000 kilowatts (1,400 hp).) (Note: Calculated maximum speed was 565 km/h (351 mph).)
1929; 8	Italy	Macchi M.67; M.M.103		1,300 kW (1,700 hp); Isotta Fraschini Asso 2-800	Retired mid race	n/a	(Note: Output closer to 1,000 kilowatts (1,400 hp).)
1929 n/a	Italy	Fiat C.29; M.M.130bis		780 kW (1,050 hp); Fiat AS.5	Withdrew before race	n/a	
1929 n/a	Italy	Piaggio P.7; M.M.127		730 kW (980 hp); Isotta Fraschini Asso 1-500	Withdrew before race	n/a	(Note: Used hydrovanes. Experienced insoluble clutch problems. Top speed estimated at 580 km/h (360 mph).)
1929 n/a	Italy	Savoia-Marchetti S.65; M.M.102		2 × 750 kW (1,010 hp); Isotta Fraschini Asso 1-500	Withdrew before race	n/a	(Note: Used tractor and pusher propellers to eliminate torque roll.)
1929; 5	Great Britain	Supermarine S.5; N219		652 kW (875 hp); Napier Lion VIIB	Third	454.02 km/h 282.11 mph	
1929; 2	Great Britain	Supermarine S.6; N247		1,400 kW (1,900 hp); Rolls-Royce R	First	528.88 km/h 328.63 mph	
1929; 10	Great Britain	Supermarine S.6; N248		1,400 kW (1,900 hp); Rolls-Royce R	Disqualified after race	535.790 km/h 332.924 mph	
1930	No races were run during 1930.						
1931	France	Bernard H.V.120; F-AKAL		1,250 kW (1,680 hp); Hispano Suiza 18R (W-18)	Withdrew before trials	n/a	
1931	France	Dewoitine HD.412		1,200 kW (1,600 hp); Hispano-Suiza 18R (W-18)	Withdrew before trials	n/a	
1931 n/a	Italy	Macchi M.C.72; M.M.177-181		1,900 kW (2,500 hp); Fiat AS.6	Withdrew before race	n/a	(Note: Completed after last race.)
1931	France	Nieuport-Delage NiD.450		890 kW (1,190 hp); Hispano-Suiza 18R	Withdrew before trials	n/a	
1931	France	Nieuport-Delage NiD.650		1,250 kW (1,680 hp); Hispano-Suiza 18R	Withdrew before trials	n/a	
1931; 1	Great Britain	Supermarine S.6B; S1596		1,750 kW (2,350 hp); Rolls-Royce R	First	547.30 km/h 340.08 mph	(Note: Third consecutive win for Great Britain, winning the Trophy permanently.)

== See also ==
- Coupe Deutsch de la Meurthe
- Gordon Bennett Trophy
- Pulitzer Trophy Races
- List of flying boats and floatplanes
- List of racing aircraft
