= Short Crusader =

British racing seaplane

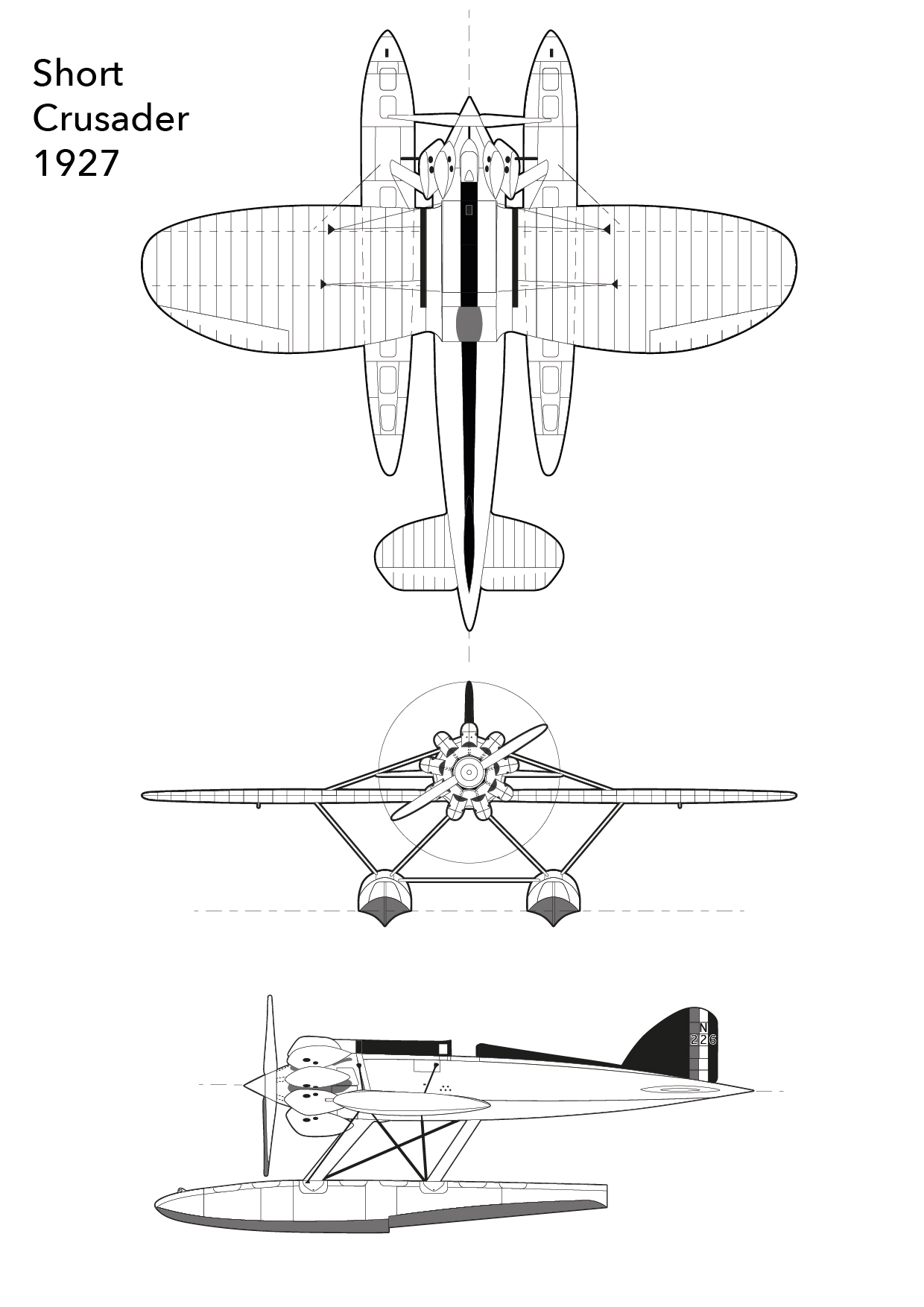

General information
- Type: Racing seaplane
- National origin: UK
- Manufacturer: Short Brothers
- Designer: W A Bristow
- Primary user: Royal Air Force, High Speed Flight
- Number built: 1

History
- First flight: 4 May 1927

The Short Crusader also called the Short-Bristow Crusader and Short-Bristol Crusader was a British racing seaplane of the 1920s, built by Short Brothers to compete in the 1927 Schneider Trophy race.

== Background ==
Although inline engines had a clear advantage for high-speed aircraft due to the smaller frontal area, Roy Fedden, the engineer in charge of aero-engine development at Bristol Aircraft, was unwilling to let the initiative in engine development pass to Rolls-Royce and Napier, and managed to obtain a contract for an uprated version of the Mercury nine-cylinder radial engine. The early production versions of this engine produced 420 hp (310 kW), but the uprated engine produced 960 hp (720 kW) in bench-testing, although for flight purposes it was limited to an output of 810 hp (600 kW) The project for a racing aircraft using this engine was entrusted to Lieut.-Col. W. A. Bristow, a consultant aero-engineer, and W. G. Carter. Submitted to the Air Ministry in early 1926, the design was accepted and a contract for one prototype was awarded. Since it became apparent that the resources of a large aircraft manufacturer would be necessary, detail design and manufacture was assigned to Shorts, who had already been made responsible for the design and manufacture of the floats.

== Design and development ==
The aircraft was a low-wing monoplane of mainly wooden construction. The wire-braced wings were of an unusual elliptical layout, with the maximum chord and thickness at mid-span on each side, tapering in towards the root. The two box-spars and the ribs were of spruce, covered with thin mahogany sheet overlaid with silk. The rear of the elliptical section fuselage was also wooden, being a monocoque construction with two layers of mahogany veneer applied over a frame of spruce formers and stringers. The forward section was built from steel tubing, covered with duralumin panels. The exposed cylinders were covered by streamlined helmets to minimise drag while admitting enough air to cool the engine, the helmet of the uppermost cylinder being continued back as a fairing which incorporated the windscreen and pilot's headrest. The twin floats, made of duralumin, were each carried on a pair of streamline section raked struts, braced by wires.

== Operational history ==
The aircraft was completed by 18 April 1927, fitted with a derated engine producing 650 hp (480 kW) and wooden propeller for initial testing. Flight testing at Rochester had been prohibited by the Air Ministry, so after taxying trials it was dismantled and taken to Felixstowe, where the RAF High Speed Flight was then based.

Initial flight testing was made by Bert Hinkler, who asked Shorts to enlarge the aircraft's rudder area before he attempted to fly it. On 4 May Hinkler flew the aircraft for the first time, making a flight during which he achieved an average speed of 232 mph (373 km/h) over a measured mile. On landing Hinkler touched down first with the left- hand float, causing the aircraft to slew round, resulting in severe buckling of the float struts. Hinkler reported that the aircraft suffered from severe hunting at full throttle, admitting that he had been wrong about the rudder area. The main problem encountered was intake surging, which caused the engine to cut out intermittently.

After repairs, restoration of the rudder to the original size and some alterations to alleviate the intake problem, Hinkler made a second flight, after which the aircraft was formally accepted by the RAF, and RAF markings and serial number were painted on the tailfin. The first RAF pilot to fly it was Flt, Lieut. S.N. Webster, who reported its flight characteristics to be pleasant, although the engine still tended to cut out: this led to some alarming episodes when the aircraft was later flown by Flying Officer H.M. Schofield. During July a number of modifications were made: a new engine was fitted, together with a forged duralumin racing propeller, an additional fuel tank was fitted in the right-hand float to provide sufficient range to complete the Schneider course, high-temperature spark plugs were fitted and changes were made to the air inlets in a further attempt to cure the engine problems.

In mid August the Crusader was dismantled and shipped on HMS Eagle to Venice. Here it was fitted with the race engine, but since it was obviously slower than the other aircraft entered, it was intended to use it solely as a practice aircraft. On 11 September Schofield took off in the aircraft: since the aircraft with full fuel load was heavy on takeoff, he held the aircraft close to the water to build up speed. It is probable that the aircraft encountered a thermal caused by the hot weather, for suddenly the right wing lifted. Schofield attempted to correct this, but the control wires to the ailerons had been crossed during reassembly, so that the aileron movement was reversed. The aircraft continued the roll, and hit the water at a speed of 150 mph (240 km/h). The fuselage broke in half at the cockpit and Schofield was thrown clear, sustaining serious bruises but no broken bones. The aircraft sank into the lagoon and was recovered a week later, when examination of the wreckage clearly established the cause of the crash.

== Operators ==
United Kingdom

- Royal Air Force
  - High Speed Flight RAF

== Specifications ==
Data from

General characteristics

- Crew: one
- Length: 25 ft (7.6 m)
- Wingspan: 26 ft 6 in (8.08 m)
- Wing area: 120 sq ft (11 m^{2})
- Airfoil: RAF 27 biconvex
- Empty weight: 1,938 lb (879 kg)
- Gross weight: 2,712 lb (1,230 kg)
- Powerplant: 1 × Bristol Mercury I 9 cylinder air-cooled radial, 810 hp (600 kW)
- Propellers: 2-bladed

Performance

- Maximum speed: 270 mph (430 km/h, 230 kn)
- Wing loading: 22.6 lb/sq ft (110 kg/m^{2})

== See also ==
Aircraft of comparable role, configuration, and era

- Supermarine S.5
- Gloster IV
- Macchi M.52

Related lists

- List of aircraft of the RAF

== Bibliography ==
- Barnes, C.H.; James, D.N. (1989). Shorts Aircraft since 1900. London: Putnam. p. 560. ISBN 0-85177-819-4.
- Pelletier, Alain (December 1978). "La vie épherère du Short-Bristow "Crusader"" [The Ephermal Life of the Short-Bristow Crusader]. Le Fana de l'Aviation (in French) (109): 34–39. ISSN 0757-4169.
- http://www.airracinghistory.freeola.com/aircraft/Short%20Crusader.htm accessed 23 April 2008
