= George Stainforth =

Royal Air Force officer

- Flight Lieutenant G H Stainforth (cigarette card)
- Born: 22 March 1899; Bromley, London, England
- Died: 27 September 1942 (aged 43); Egypt
- Burial place: Ismailia War Memorial Cemetery
- Military career
- Allegiance: United Kingdom
- Branch: British Army; Royal Air Force
- Rank: Wing Commander
- Commands: No. 89 Squadron RAF (1941–42); No. 600 Squadron RAF (1941); No. 30 Squadron RAF (1937)
- Conflicts: First World War; Second World War
- Awards: Air Force Cross

Wing Commander George Hedley Stainforth, AFC (22 March 1899 – 27 September 1942) was a Royal Air Force pilot and the first man to exceed 400 miles per hour.

== Early life ==
George Hedley Stainforth was the son of George Staunton Stainforth, a solicitor. He attended Dulwich College and Weymouth College. He joined the British Army before joining the Royal Air Force.

== Career ==
George Stainforth joined the Royal Air Force on 15 March 1923 and was posted to No. 19 Squadron RAF on 10 April 1924. He was promoted after four years to flight lieutenant on 1 July 1928, and was posted to the Marine Aircraft Experimental Establishment (MAEE) for duties with the High Speed Flight, also known as The Flight.

=== 1929 Schneider Trophy ===
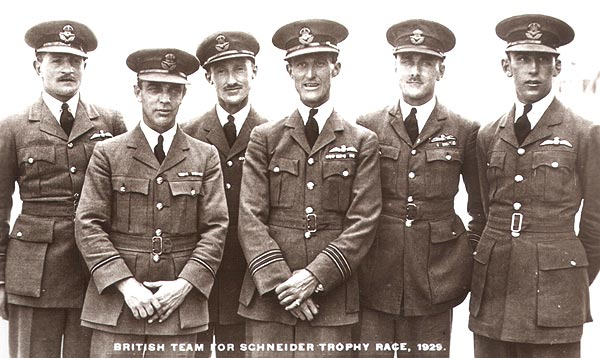
1929 Schneider Trophy team Stainforth is second from right

Stainforth was serving with The High Speed Flight in 1929, as pilot of the Gloster VI entrant. The aircraft was withdrawn for technical reasons shortly before the competition, which was then won by his teammate Flt. Lt. H. Waghorn in a Supermarine S.6.

On the following day, 10 September 1929, Stainforth took the Gloster VI up for an attempt at the record over a measured mile course. He achieved a top speed of 351.3 mph and a ratified world absolute speed record, averaged over four runs of 336.3 mph.

Augustus Orlebar, in a Supermarine S.6, raised the record to over 350 mph two days later.

=== 1931 Schneider Trophy and the 400 mph barrier ===
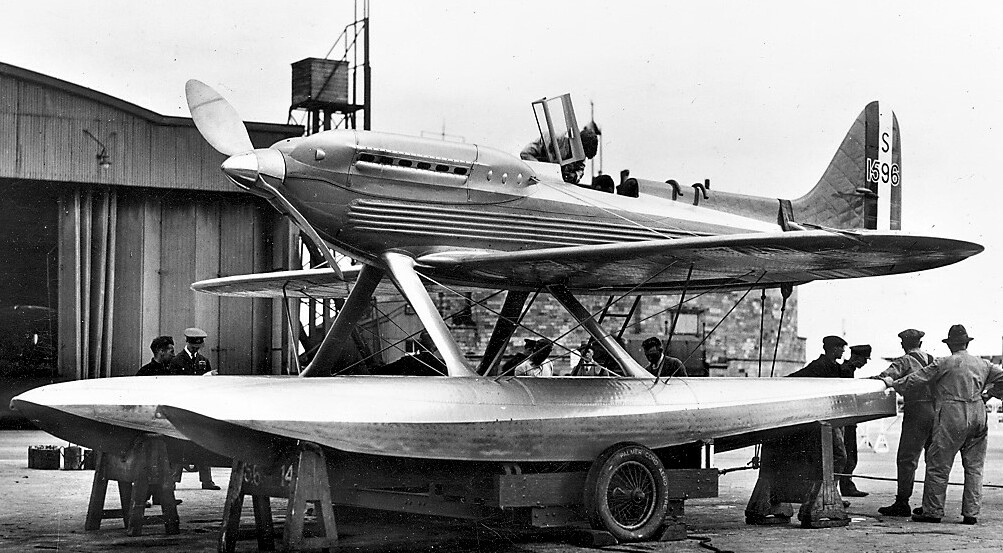
Supermarine S.6B, S1596

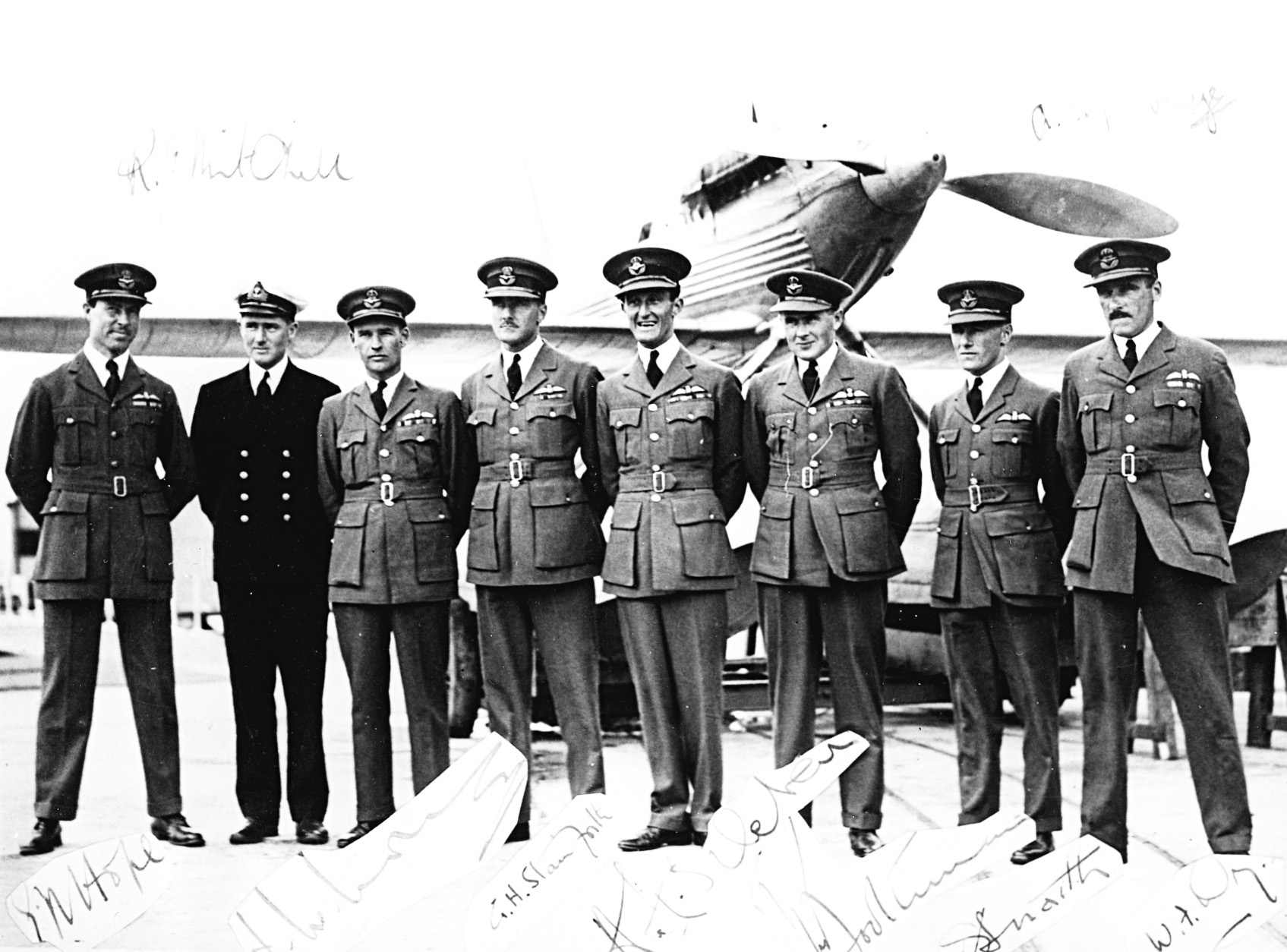
1931 Schneider Trophy team Stainforth is fourth from left

Flight Lieutenant Stainforth was also one of the team in 1931 when the Trophy was won for the third time in a row, and thus the competition won outright. Following the Trophy triumph on 16 September, he had the chance to once again break the airspeed record. His first attempt was made in Supermarine S.6B S1596, in which he achieved 379 mph. Following a minor taxiing accident during testing though, he caused S1596 to turn over and sink. Although she was recovered by divers the next day, he now transferred to S1595. This was another S.6B, which could also be fitted with the same specially prepared 2,600 bhp Rolls-Royce R "sprint" engine, serial R27 and airscrew for the record attempt. The engine was using a specially prepared fuel mixture of petrol, methanol and ethyl. Starting the engine was uneasy and there was considerable danger of engine explosion.

On 29 September 1931, the record attempt was made. Due to the aircraft having no flaps, Stainforth took off from the water after a very long run up. The record was established at a height of 400 m. He made a perfect record run over the four timed miles in opposing directions and achieved an average of 407.5 mph (655.8 km/h), being the first man in the world to exceed 400 mph. For this achievement he was awarded the Air Force Cross on 9 October 1931.

Stainforth later went on to break another record, this time by flying upside down for 12 minutes.

=== Career after The Flight ===
Leaving the MAEE in 1935, Stainforth spent a short period as Adjutant aboard HMS Glorious. He was promoted to squadron leader on 1 June 1936, served with No. 802 Squadron in the Fleet Air Arm of the Royal Air Force and was posted as the Officer Commanding No. 30 Squadron RAF in Iraq. In February 1939, he returned to Central Flying School Upavon as Officer Commanding Examining and Handling Flight. On 12 January 1940, he was promoted to wing commander and commanded No. 600 Squadron RAF. In June 1940, Stainforth and Stanford Tuck, the Battle of Britain ace, were posted to Farnborough in south central England. His task was to take part in comparison trials of a captured Messerschmitt Bf 109E and a Supermarine Spitfire Mark II. The tests began with Stainforth flying the Messerschmitt and Tuck flying the Spitfire in level flight, dives and turns, and at various speeds at different altitudes.

Stainforth was appointed as Officer Commanding No. 89 (Night Fighter) Squadron in October 1941. At the end of that year, the squadron was posted to the Middle East, and on the night of 27 September 1942, Wing Commander Stainforth was killed in action while piloting Bristol Beaufighter serial X7700 at Gharib, near the Gulf of Suez. He was buried with full military honours, at the British Cemetery Ismailia, Egypt.

Following his death, a dossier was compiled by his friends detailing many of his achievements, recorded remarks and memories of him by distinguished officers and men who served with him during his lifetime. It also includes extracts from his own thoughts and writings. A copy of the dossier has been presented to the Royal Air Force Museum at Hendon.

== The Stainforth Trophy ==
The Stainforth Trophy was originally presented in 1974 to the Air Officer Commanding-in-Chief RAF Strike Command, Air Chief Marshal Sir Denis Smallwood by members of the No. 89 Squadron Reunion Club, to commemorate the long and distinguished career, both as an aviator and as a Royal Air Force officer, of Wing Commander George Hedley Stainforth. The Trophy had been commissioned and paid for, anonymously, by a Mrs Stella Sketch who died in May 2000. The Stainforth Trophy is awarded annually by the Air Officer Commanding-in-Chief RAF Strike Command to the operational station within the Command which has produced the best overall performance and is their most prestigious trophy. The Stainforth family are still represented at the presentation.

=== Design ===
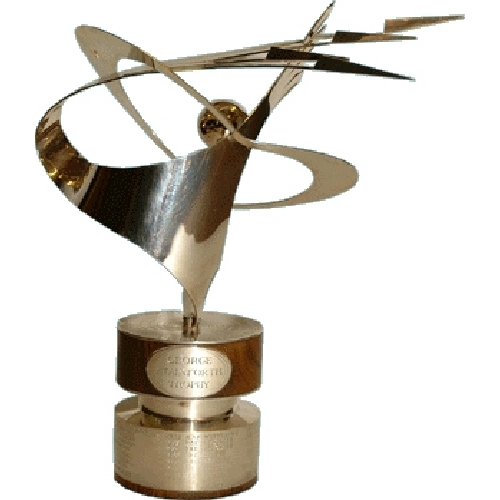
The Stainforth Trophy

The Stainforth Trophy was designed by Robin Beresford. The trophy depicts in silver three supersonic aircraft and spiralling vapour trails soaring into the stratosphere. The artist also tried to display an awareness of the achievements of the Schneider Trophy Team in the design, being aware that these achievements resulted in the improved design and development, by R. J. Mitchell, of the Spitfire, which played such a major role in Britain's victory in the Second World War. In the design of the trophy, the artist has tried to show the Earth as seen by the astronauts, vapour trails ending in arrows to depict high speed altitude flight, and with an outward sweep to infinity, which suggests that the sky is literally the limit of man's achievement in the air. Into his design, he has incorporated a star and its orbit to evoke the achievements of science and the Royal Air Force motto Per ardua ad astra.

== Trivia ==
=== Cigarette cards ===
The image of G H Stainforth appeared in a number of Cigarette Card Sets including:

- Lambert & Butler's Famous British Airmen & Airwomen
- Carreras: Famous Airmen and Airwomen (issue year 1936). 50 Cards. Named as Flight Lieutenant GH Stainforth.
- Carreras: Famous British Fliers (issue year 1956). 50 Cards. Named as GH Stainforth.
- Park Drive cigarettes (Gallaher Ltd): Champions 1st series (issue year 1934). Number 38 – G H Stainforth

=== Stainforth Weather Vane, Greenhill Gardens, Weymouth ===
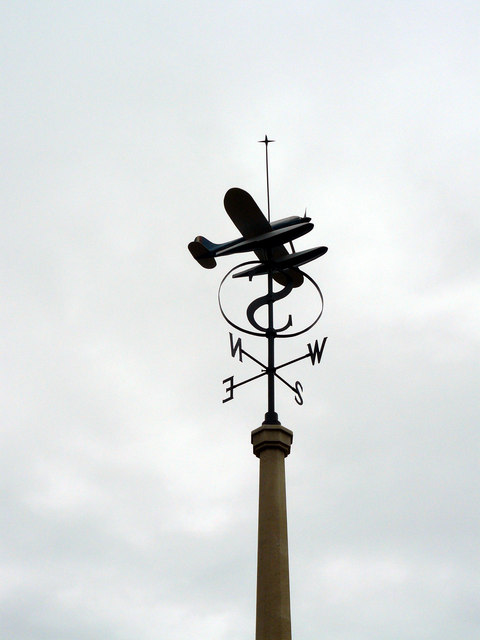
Weather vane in Greenhill Gardens, Weymouth, commemorating Stainforth's world speed record

The weather vane was originally presented to Weymouth College in 1932 (at that point known as Weymouth Grammar School, later renamed Weymouth Secondary School) as a memorial to Stainforth, its former pupil, who had set the world air speed record the previous year. Made of hardwood and covered in a copper sheath, the vane was erected above Weymouth College chapel in 1932, but moved for safety at the start of World War II. It was later presented to the borough council and placed in Greenhill Gardens in May 1952. In 1996, the vane had to be taken down after the effects of years of sea spray and coastal winds had taken their toll, but it has since been restored and is now back in the gardens.
