= Gloster IV =

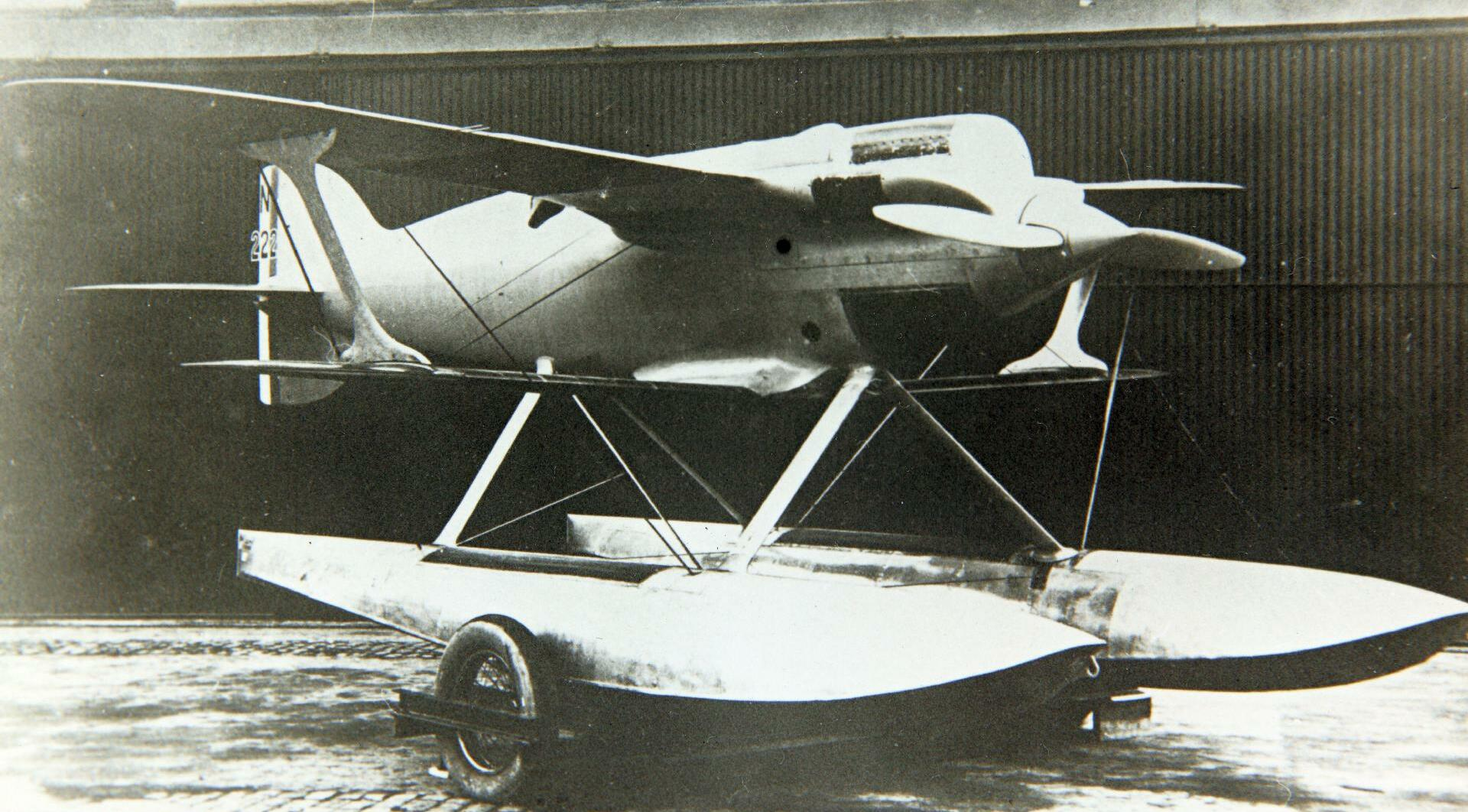

General information
- Type: Racing seaplane
- National origin: United Kingdom
- Manufacturer: Gloster Aircraft Company
- Designer: Henry Folland
- Primary user: Royal Air Force
- Number built: 3

History
- First flight: 1927

The Gloster IV was a single-engined biplane racing floatplane designed and produced by the British aviation manufacturer Gloster Aircraft Company.

In response to an order from the British Air Ministry for a high speed floatplane for the 1927 Schneider Trophy race, Gloster designed the Gloster IV; it was a development of the Gloster III which had finished second in the 1925 race. Henry Folland, Gloster's chief designer, redesigned the aircraft to minimise its drag. Akin to its predecessors, the Gloster IV was of wooden construction, featuring a monocoque fuselage and single bay wings. Both the upper and lower wings were gulled to allow the drag of the wing/fuselage junction to be minimised, while radiators were built into the surfaces of the wings and floats.

In total, three aircraft were built, differing in the surface area of the wings and the arrangement of the tail. All three aircraft made their first flights during the summer of 1927. A single aircraft, the Gloster IVB, competed in the Schneider Trophy 1927 race, however, it was forced to retired part way through due to the imminent failure of the propeller shaft. The three aircraft built continued to be flown as trainers by the High Speed Flight for several years.

== Design and development ==
During the interwar period, numerous nations sought to compete for the prestigious Schneider Trophy. Seeking a competitive entry for the 1927 race, Britain's Air Ministry was determined to put forward aircraft with greater performance that those of the last few competitions, during which the British entries were soundly bested by American Curtiss floatplanes in 1923 and 1925, while no British aircraft even entered the 1926 competition, which was won by the Italian Macchi M.39. To this end, the Air Ministry placed orders for the design and limited production of high speed floatplanes with numerous British aircraft manufacturers, including Gloster, Supermarine (who would produce the S.5) and Shorts (who developed the Crusader).

At the time, there was significant divergence of opinion on if the optimal racing aircraft ought to be a biplane or a monoplane; while the high speed aircraft developed in Germany were almost entirely monoplanes by 1927, France and Britain both opted to pursue development of both biplane and monoplane configurations for their racing aircraft. Gloster's chief designer, Henry Folland, decided to persist with the biplane configuration following an extensive study of the matter, centred around three key areas: speed, wing rigidity, and application to service requirements. Certainly, torsional rigidity, and thus resistance to undesirable wing flutter, was considerably more easily achieved with a biplane configuration than with a monoplane. Gloster also had a long established reputation for building high speed biplanes.

One key performance aspect that was consistently appreciated irrespective of the basic configuration was the need to minimise drag. It was recognised that the majority of the aircraft's head resistance would typically be attributable to two aspects of the aircraft: the fuselage and the floats. Efforts were made to minimise these areas and revise their lines to sharpen their form; this work reportedly yielded a 45 percent reduction in comparison to that of the Gloster III that had participated in the 1925 race. Furthermore, the wings and fuselage were smoothly blended together, not only reducing drag but also boosting lift by 15 percent. These reductions, in combination with other improvements such as increased engine power and propeller efficiency, allegedly boosted the aircraft's maximum speed potential by 70 MPH.

The optimal fuselage section from an aerodynamic did not lend itself to conventional construction approaches, thus a tradeoff was made between aerodynamic shaping and ease of manufacture. The construction technique used was known as the "double-diagonal' system amongst boatbuilders, comprising fairly narrow spruce planks at roughly 45 degree angles from the centre line while the plants of the twin skins crossed over one another at right angles. While most of the fuselage had two skins, areas that were expected to bare high loads had more layers applied. The fins, which were covered in laminated spruce, were integral to the fuselage. The tail plane was composed of wood and was adjustable (on the ground) to any desired incident; it was largely integral with the fuselage.

The wing design of the Gloster IV was somewhat unorthodox, the external covering being a part of the stress-bearing structure. The airfoil sections were constructed using similar lamination practices to that of the fuselage. Specifically, the skin being built up upon the formers and secured to the framework of multiple spars, the leading and trailing edges, and intermediate contour pieces, the latter being used in place of traditional ribs. The wings proved to be particularly strong, being capable of supporting a load equivalent to 13 times the weight of the seaplane before indicators of failure would present; this was considered particularly conducive for undertaking high rates of acceleration.

The aircraft was furnished with a relatively thin-section lower wing that also had a small chord. The wing roots were curved in such a manner that it could be fitted into the fuselage with a minimum of interference. A further interference reduction measure was the positioning if all bracing wires that left the wing surfaces at large angles. Furthermore, these lift wires imposed relatively little compression load upon the upper wing spars. A novel shock absorbing feature, comprising strategically placed rubber discs, was incorporated so that the landing wires would not go slack or vibrate at moments of low loading.

The wings bore large surface-type radiators upon them; specially developed by Gloster, these radiators, consisting of thin corrugated copper sheets, were particularly effective at preventing engine overheating. By positioning them on both wings, a larger proportion of the radiators was kept in the slip stream generated by the propeller. The top wing was faired into the cylinder blocks of the engine. The propeller, which was manufactured by Gloster, was composed of forged duralumin in a manner that achieved minimal blade distortion under load.

The engine mounting was particularly rigid, comprising a pair of box-section engine bearers composed of duralumin and supported by a series of steel tubes. No welding was performed during the fabrication, the main joints relying on stainless steel bolts. Directly beneath the engine bearers was the oil tank and its integral corrugated primary cooler (auxiliary coolers were present on the sides of the fuselage); its shape conformed with the contours of the surrounding fuselage. All seven of the aircraft's fuel tanks were held within the fuselage; their size was restricted so that they could be readily lifted in and out of the aircraft via small openings during maintenance.

The aircraft was equipped with duralumin floats that incorporated a single-step curved desk design. They were relatively slender and tapered to minimise drag, being supported on two pairs of struts that met on the fuselage's centreline. The two floats were connected to one another via a series of horizontal wires instead of struts. The inter-wing struts were designed to minimise their frontal area, being composed of forged duralumin that was lightened out. All control elements were run internally; the ailerons being actuated via torque tubes that ran inside the top wing while the elevator and rudder's controls ran within the fuselage. A custom variable-gearing mechanism was provisioned that permitted the ratios between the control column and the final control surface movement to be adjusted by the pilot, permitted the flight controls to be well suited to both high speed and low speed flight.

== Operational history ==
The three Gloster IVs were first flown in July–August 1927, with the two short-span aircraft (the Gloster IVA and IVB) being shipped to Venice in August 1927. The Gloster IVB was finally chosen to compete with the two S.5s in the race, the Crusader having crashed due to having its control cables crossed on re-assembly.

On 26 September 1927, the day of the race, the Gloster IVB, piloted by Flight Lieutenant Samuel Kinkead was the first aircraft to take off, completing five laps before retiring, with the race being won by Flight Lieutenant Sidney Webster flying the S.5. On inspection, it was found that the Gloster's propeller shaft was seriously cracked and would probably have failed if Kinkead had not retired. Prior to its withdrawal, the Gloster IV had demonstrated promising performance, having achieved faster lap speeds than the directly driven Supermarine S.5, although not the geared model of the same aircraft.

Following the race, the Gloster IVA and IVB were returned to the United Kingdom, where they were modified to improve the pilot's view by raising the upper wing and used as high speed trainers. They were used to train pilots for the 1929 race, with the IVB crashing during a landing accident in December 1930 and the IVA used again as a trainer for the 1931 race. The original Gloster IV was meanwhile sold with the intention of being converted to a landplane and used in attempt on the world air speed record, but these plans came to nothing.

== Variants ==
Gloster IV
Serial number N224. Original larger wings. Powered by 900 hp (671 kW) direct-drive Napier Lion VIIA.
Gloster IVA
Serial number N222. Reduced span wings and modified tail. Powered by direct-drive Lion VIIA
Gloster IVB
Serial number N223. Reduced span wings and powered by geared Napier Lion VIIB engine.

== Operators ==
United Kingdom

- Royal Air Force
  - High Speed Flight

== Specifications (Gloster IVB) ==
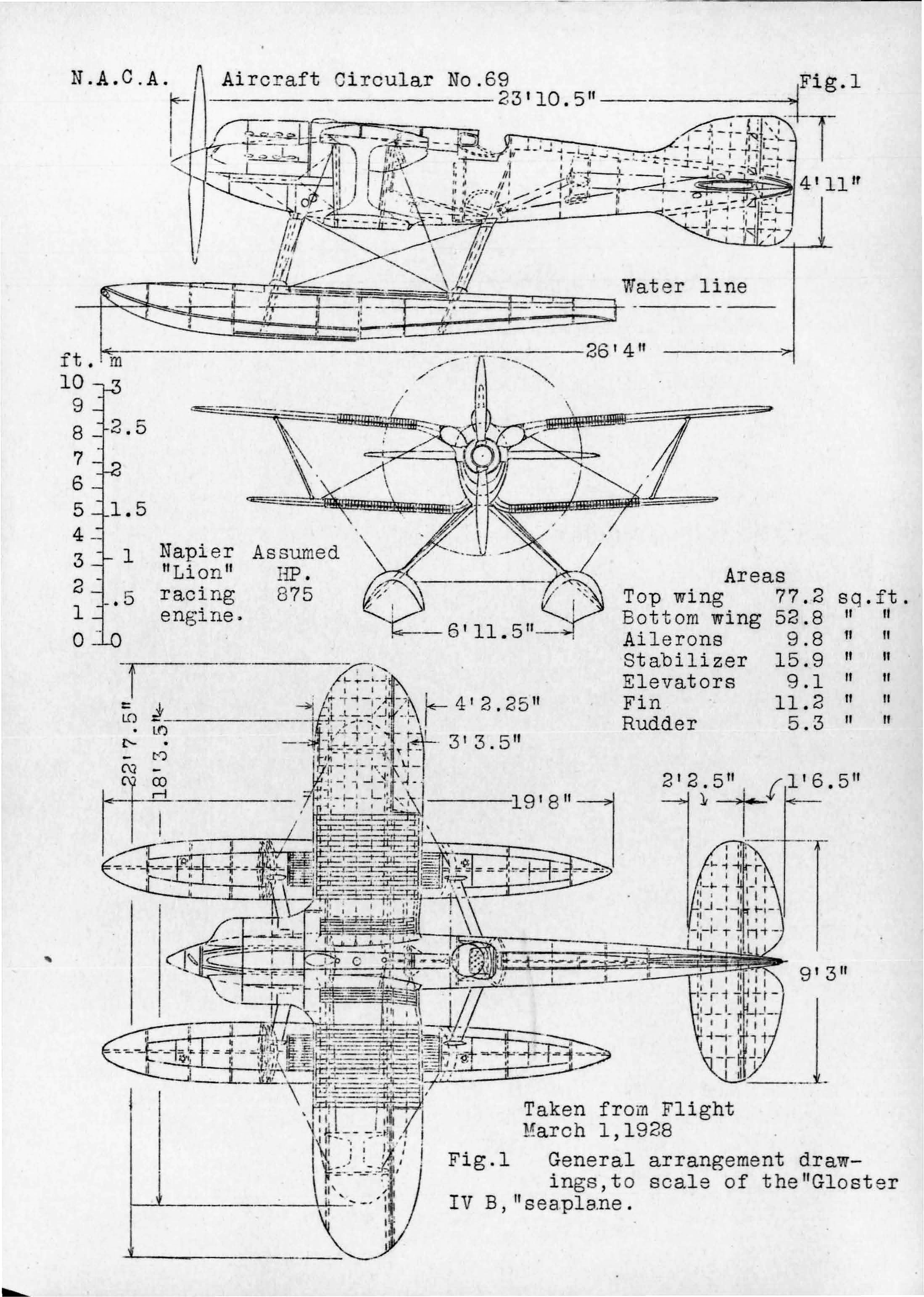
Gloster IV 3-view drawing from NACA Aircraft Circular No.69

Data from Gloster Aircraft since 1917, National Advisory Committee for Aeronautics

General characteristics

- Crew: One
- Length: 26 ft 4 in (8.03 m)
- Wingspan: 22 ft 7.5 in (6.896 m)
- Height: 9 ft 2 in (2.79 m)
- Wing area: 139 sq ft (12.9 m^{2})
- Airfoil: RAF25
- Empty weight: 2,613 lb (1,185 kg)
- Gross weight: 3,305 lb (1,499 kg)
- Powerplant: 1 × Napier Lion VIIB W-12 liquid-cooled piston engine, 885 hp (660 kW)
- Propellers: 2-bladed fixed-pitch propeller

Performance

- Maximum speed: 295 mph (475 km/h, 256 kn)
- Stall speed: 97 mph (156 km/h, 84 kn)
- Endurance: One hour and six minutes

== See also ==
- Gloster II
- Gloster III
- Gloster VI
- Supermarine S.5
- Macchi M.52
