= High Speed Flight RAF =

High Speed Flight
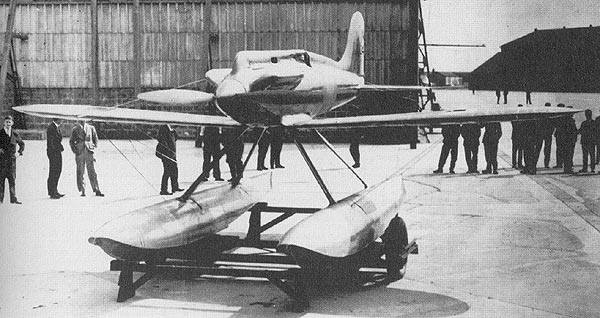
- Gloster VI N249 of the High Speed Flight outside the Calshot hangars
- Active: 1927-1931
- Country: UK
- Branch: Royal Air Force
- Role: Special unit competing for the Schneider Trophy
- Size: Flight
- Base: RAF Calshot; RAF Felixstowe

The RAF High Speed Flight, sometimes known as 'The Flight' , was a small flight of the Royal Air Force (RAF) formed for the purpose of competing in the Schneider Trophy contest for racing seaplanes during the 1920s. The flight was together only until the trophy was won outright, after which it was disbanded.

== Background ==
In the Schneider Trophy race of 1926 both competing countries, Italy and the United States, had used military pilots. There had not been time to arrange a British team to compete. The British defeat of 1925 was held to be the result of technical inferiority and lack of organisation. The Air Ministry therefore agreed to support a British team, with pilots drawn from the RAF, and so the High Speed Flight was formed at the Marine Aircraft Experimental Establishment Felixstowe in preparation for the 1927 race.

== 1927 ==
For the 1927 competition, six aircraft, from three manufacturers, were taken to Venice: a pair of Supermarine S.5s, three Gloster IVs and a single Short Crusader. The Crusader was slower than the others, and was intended for training, but crashed on 11 September 1927. The cause was later identified as a control rigging error, following re-assembly after the journey from the UK to Venice.

The Supermarine S.5s came in first and second, with neither the Gloster nor the three Italian aircraft completing the race. As the winning nation, the UK would host the following event. This was the last annual competition. Subsequently, the race was held on a biannual schedule, to allow more time for development between races.

1927 team
Pilot	Aircraft	Race position
Flight Lieutenant Samuel Kinkead	Gloster IVB N223	did not finish
Flight Lieutenant Sidney Webster	Supermarine S.5 N220	1st place, at 281.65 mph
Flight Lieutenant Worsley	Supermarine S.5 N219	2nd place, at 272.91 mph
Squadron Leader Leonard Slatter	Short Crusader N226	
Flying Officer Harry Methuen Schofield	Short Crusader N226	did not compete, injured in Crusader crash

== 1928 ==
The High Speed Flight was disbanded after the race. The Treasury agreed to fund the aircraft for the next event but the Air Ministry objected initially to the use of serving pilots. This was sorted out and the High Speed Flight reformed. In March 1928, Samuel Kinkead made an attempt on the air speed record using a Supermarine S5. At the approach to the start of the course, however, the aircraft plunged into the water, killing him.

== 1929 ==
The 1929 Trophy race was to be held at Cowes. With little money forthcoming from the Ministry aircraft and engine development had to be private ventures, with government money only being used to purchase the completed product. The costs of the 1927 and 1929 meetings was stated to be £196,000 and £220,000 respectively. Rolls-Royce had now developed the supercharged R engine, giving Supermarine's designer R.J. Mitchell far more power for his new S.6 than the naturally aspirated Napier Lion VIIB of the S.5. Gloster's first racing monoplane, the Gloster VI, had stayed with the Lion, but was also now supercharged as the Lion VIID.

S.6 N247 came first, piloted by Waghorn, with Atcherley and N248 disqualified for cutting inside a turn. The Gloster VI had been withdrawn before the race, but Stainforth used it to set a new speed record the following day. A record which soon fell in turn to one of the S.6s.

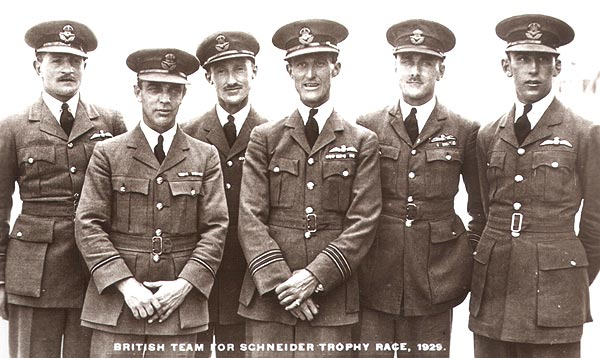
British team for the 1929 Schneider Trophy race. From left to right; Waghorn, Moon, Grieg, Orlebar, Stainforth and Atcherley

1929 team
Pilot	Aircraft	Race position
Flight Lieutenant Samuel Kinkead		killed 12 March 1928 in accident attempting speed record attempt flying Supermarine S.5
Flying Officer Henry Waghorn	Supermarine S.6 N247	1st place, at 328.6 mph
Flying Officer Moon		Engineering Officer
Flight Lieutenant D D'Arcy A. Greig	S.5	
Squadron Leader Augustus Orlebar		Flight Commander; Record 357.7 mph in N247
Flight Lieutenant George Stainforth	Gloster VI N249	
Flying Officer Richard Atcherley	S.6 N248	

== 1931 ==
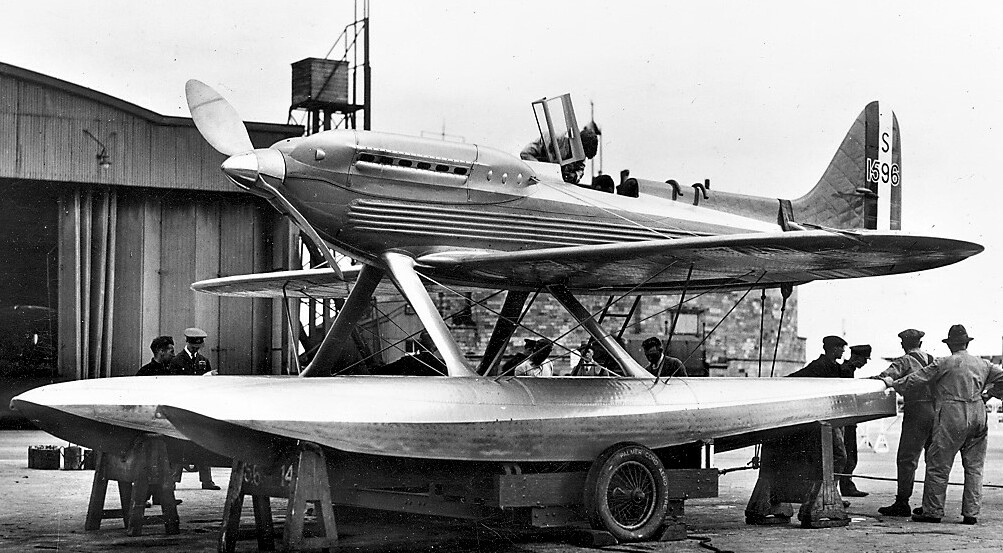
Supermarine S.6B

Under the rules of the Schneider Trophy, a third win would be an outright win in perpetuity. The official attitude after the 1929 victory was summed up by the Prime Minister Ramsay MacDonald, "We are going to do our level best to win again."

However official support was withdrawn because of the need for economies following the Wall Street crash of October 1929. The Cabinet vetoed RAF involvement and Government funding in a sporting event. Trenchard's view that there was no advantage as aircraft development would continue whether or not the UK competed. The public however had other ideas and backed the idea of a national team. A wealthy benefactor, shipping heiress Lady Lucy Houston, offered to pay £100,000 towards its cost. With the financial burden removed, the Government allowed the RAF to compete again.

The delay in funding meant that there was no time to design a new aircraft to compete; instead, the S.6 design was modified: the output of the R engine was increased by 400 hp to 2,300 hp and the airframe was strengthened, producing S.6B. Two new aircraft were built to this specification and the two existing S.6s were upgraded and renamed S.6A.

In the event, the race itself was an anti-climax - no other countries entered a team. All that had to be done was for one of the aircraft from the flight to complete the course. The plan was thus to attempt to beat the previous race time with one of the S6.Bs, then to either go all-out for a new record attempt, or to use the S6.A to secure the Trophy.

The first goal was met according to plan; Flight Lieutenant Boothman, won in S.6B S1595 at 340.08 mph, 12 mph faster than the 1929 time.

Work then began on the record attempt, which suffered a setback when a minor accident led to S1596 sinking. As a result, both the race and the record were flown by S1595 (now in the Science Museum, London). The engines were swapped for this attempt though, from the "reliable" race tune to the ultimate performance "sprint" engine and its special fuel. Flight Lieutenant Stainforth then achieved a record of 407.5 mph, the first person to travel faster than 400 mph; "the mark that matters", in the words of Ernest Hives. In comparison, land speed records didn't achieve this for 15 years, until after the Second World War and John Cobb's Railton Mobil Special.

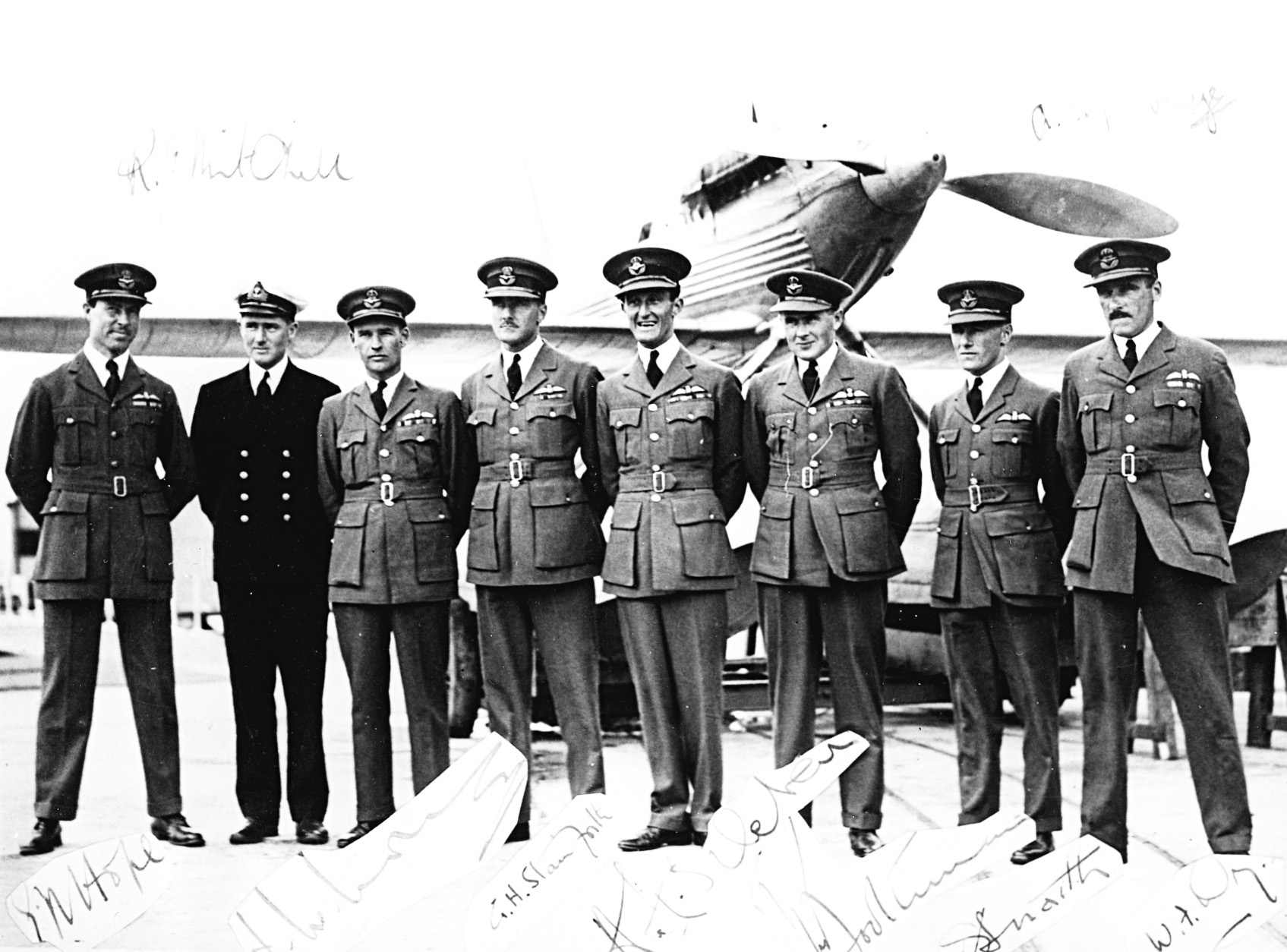
British team for the 1931 Schneider Trophy race. From left to right; Hope, Brinton, Long, Stainforth, Orlebar, Boothman, Snaith and Dry

1931 team
Pilot	Aircraft	Race position
Flight Lieutenant E.J.L. Hope		
Lieutenant R.L. "Jerry" Brinton (Fleet Air Arm)		
Flight Lieutenant Freddy Long	S.6B S1596	
Flight Lieutenant George Stainforth	S.6B	record attempt planned with S1595, actually with S1596 after accident
Squadron Leader A. Orlebar		Flight Commander
Flight Lieutenant John Boothman	S.6B S1595	1st place, at 340.08 mph.
Flying Officer Leonard Snaith	S.6A N248	
Flight Lieutenant W.F. Dry		Engineering Officer

The Flight was wound up within weeks of the 1931 victory, it having served its purpose.

== Aircraft operated ==
- 1927
  - Gloster I (training)
  - Gloster IVB
  - Supermarine S.5
  - Short Crusader
- 1929
  - Gloster VI
  - Supermarine S.6
- 1931
  - Supermarine S.6A
  - Supermarine S.6B

== Post-war reformation ==
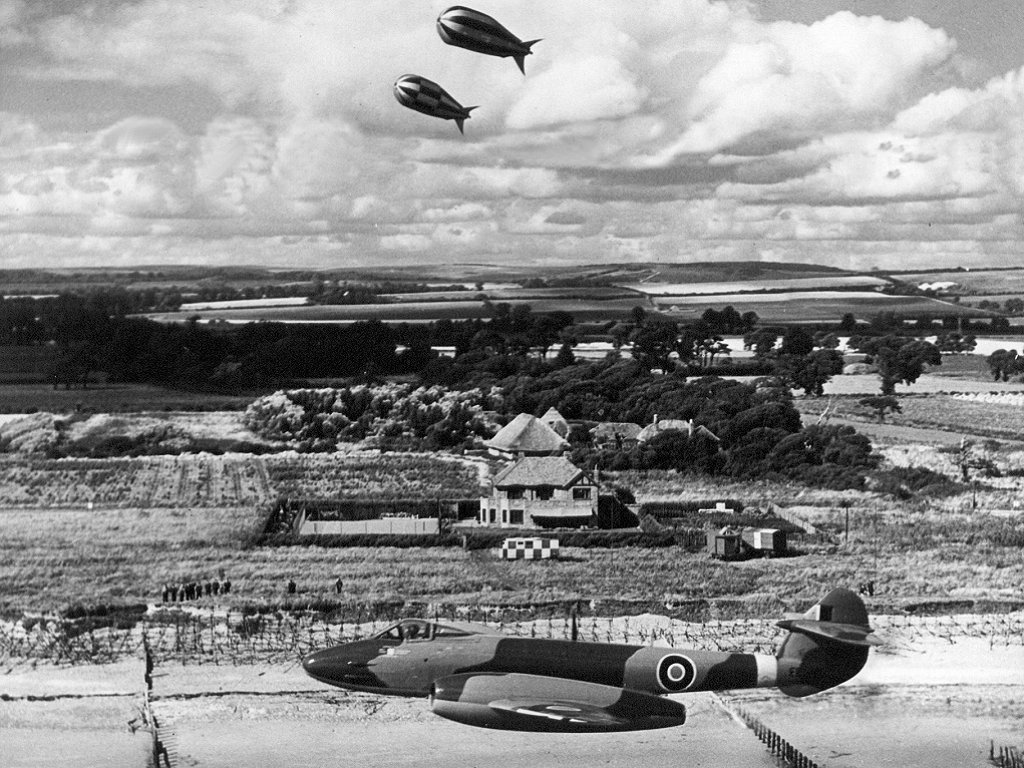
Gp Capt Donaldson passing a timing station on the high speed run course in EE549

In 1946 the High-Speed Flight was re-formed, to attempt the World Air Speed Record. The Flight was under the command of Group Capt. E. M. Donaldson DSO, AFC and would include such notable pilots as Flt. Lt. Neville Duke DSO, DFC, Wing Cdr. Roland Beamont DSO and Squadron Leader W.A. Waterton AFC. Two Meteor IVs, EE549 and EE550, were prepared for the speed record attempts. Their modifications were small, the significant ones being a small uprating to the thrust of the Derwent engines, an aluminium cockpit hood as the normal Perspex hood was softening in the heat at over 600 mph.

The course was set out over 3-km between Littlehampton and Worthing; over five laps Donaldson achieved 616 mph; Waterton 614 mph.
