= Supermarine S.6B =

1930s British racing seaplane

S.6B
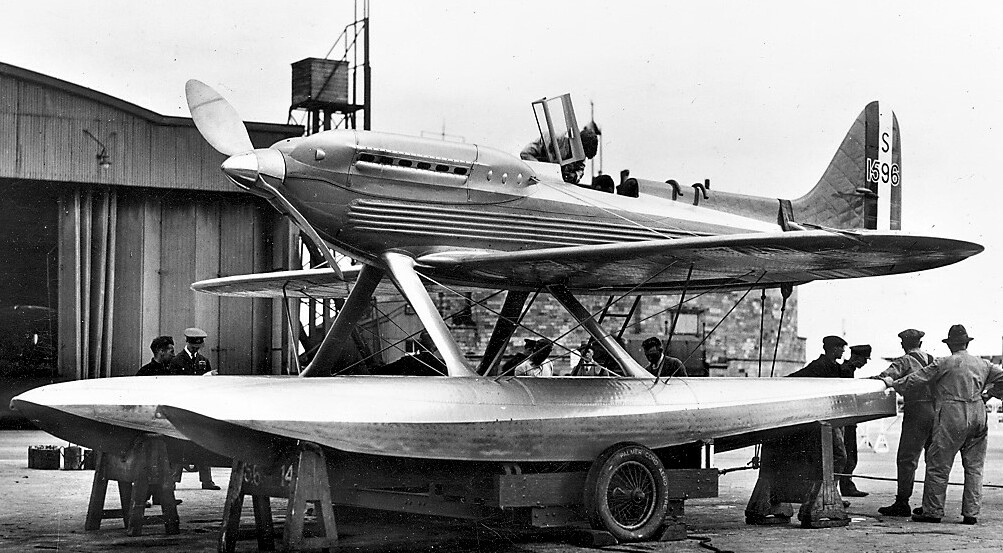

General information
- Type: Racing seaplane
- National origin: United Kingdom
- Manufacturer: Supermarine
- Designer: R.J. Mitchell
- Primary user: Royal Air Force
- Number built: 2

History
- Introduction date: 1931
- First flight: 1931
- Developed from: Supermarine S.6

The Supermarine S.6B is a British racing seaplane developed by R.J. Mitchell for the Supermarine company to take part in the Schneider Trophy competition of 1931. The S.6B marked the culmination of Mitchell's quest to "perfect the design of the racing seaplane" and represented the cutting edge of aerodynamic technology for the era.

The S.6B was last in a line of racing seaplanes to be developed by Supermarine, following the S.4, S.5 and the S.6. Despite these predecessors having previously won the Schneider Trophy competition twice, the development of the S.6B was hampered by wavering government support, which was first promised then withdrawn, and then given once more after a high-profile public campaign encouraged by Lord Rothermere and backed by a substantial donation by Lady Houston. Once government backing had been secured, there were only nine months before the race, so Mitchell's only realistic option was to refine the existing S.6, rather than attempting a new design.

The principal differences between the S.6 and the S.6B were the increased power of the Rolls-Royce R engine and redesigned floats: minor aerodynamic refinements typically aimed at drag reduction were also made. A pair of S.6Bs, serials S1595 and S1596, were built for the competition. Flown by members of RAF High Speed Flight, the type competed successfully, winning the Schneider Trophy for Britain. Shortly after the race, S.6B S1596, flown by Flt Lt. George Stainforth, broke the world air speed record, attaining a peak speed of 407.5 mph (655.67 km/h).

== Development ==
=== Financing ===
Despite the Prime Minister Ramsay MacDonald's pledge that government support would be provided for the next British race entrant immediately after Britain's 1929 victory, official funding was withdrawn less than two months later following the Wall Street crash; the official reason given for the withdrawal that the previous two contests had collected sufficient data on high speed flight, so further expenditure of public money was unwarranted. A further rationale given for the government's revised position was that that original purpose in pioneering high speed seaplanes had been satisfied by this point. A committee established by the Royal Aero Club, responsible for organising the 1931 race, and which included representatives from both the aircraft and aero engine industries, was formed to discuss the feasibility of a privately funded entry, but concluded that not only would this be beyond their financial reach, but that the lack of the highly skilled RAF pilots of the High-Speed Flight would pose a severe problem.

The withdrawal of backing resulted in enormous public disappointment: having won two successive races, a British victory in a third race would secure the trophy outright. As ever active in aviation affairs, Lord Rothermere's Daily Mail group of newspapers launched a public appeal for money to support a British race entrant; in response, several thousand pounds were raised. Lady Houston publicly pledged £100,000. The British government also changed its position and announced its support for an entry in January 1931; however, by this point, there were less than nine months left to design, produce and prepare any race entrant. The RAF High Speed Flight was reformed while Mitchell and Rolls-Royce set to work.

=== Redesign and refinement ===
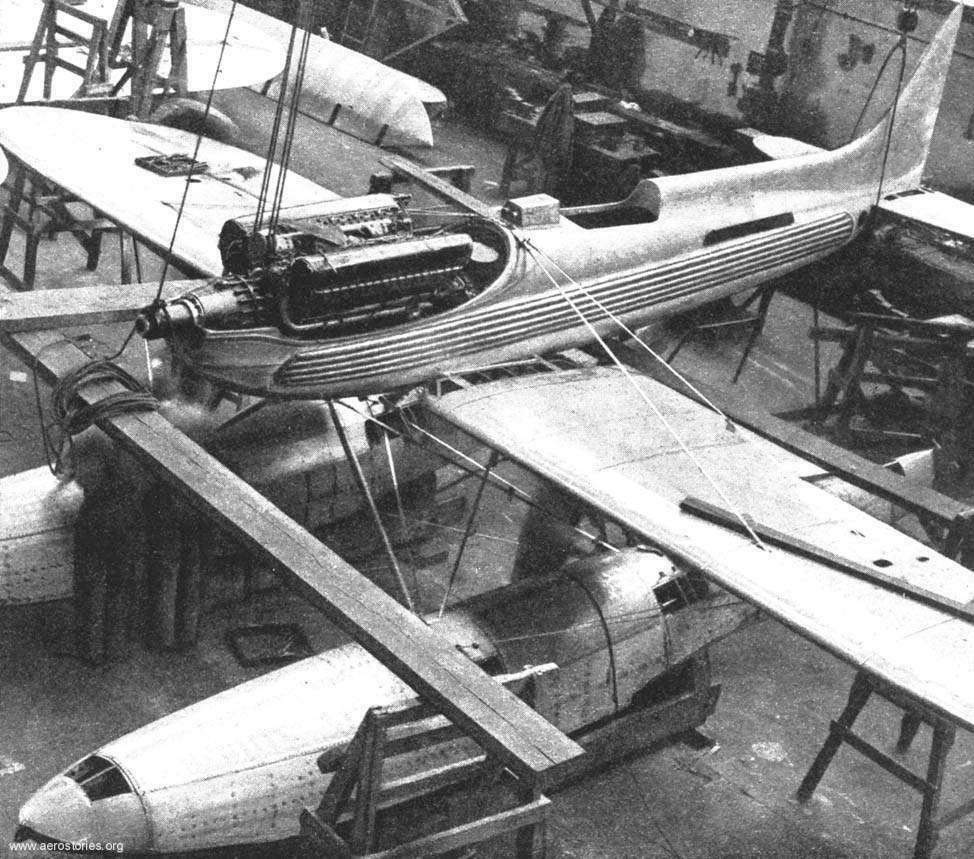
The Supermarine S.6B under construction, showing the Rolls-Royce R engine

Mitchell, with limited time to prepare an entry, knew that there was not enough time left to design a new aircraft from scratch. The obvious means of improving the S.6's performance was by obtaining more power from the R-Type engine. Engineers at Rolls-Royce had managed to increase the available power of the engine by 400 hp (298 kW), enabling it to now provide up to 2,300 hp (1,715 kW); however, this level of performance was only guaranteed for a short time. To improve the engine performance, the use of an exotic fuel mix was necessary, as well as the adoption of sodium-cooled valves. Instead, he refined the design of the existing Supermarine S.6, the new variant being referred to as the Supermarine S.6B. Mitchell retained the majority of the S.6's design, his efforts being principally focused on improving the prospective aircraft's heat dissipation; speaking on a radio broadcast, he later referred to the S.6B as a "flying radiator". Mitchell decided to use the aircraft's floats as an additional radiator area; these were longer than those of the S.6, their design being supported by a series of wind tunnel tests performed at the National Physical Laboratory, which was also an area in which government support was helpful to the project. The floats were extended forward by some three feet (0.9 m); while longer than their predecessors, they were streamlined and had a smaller frontal area.

Other modifications to the airframe design were mostly limited to minor improvements and some strengthening in order to cope with the increased weight of the aircraft.

== Operational history ==
=== Competition and records ===
Although the British team faced no competitors, due to misfortunes and delays suffered by other intending participants, the RAF High Speed Flight brought a total of six Supermarine Schneider racers to Calshot Spit on Southampton Water for training and practice. These aircraft were: S.5 serial number N219, second at Venice in 1927, S.5 N220, winner at Venice in 1927, two S.6s with new engines and redesignated as S.6As (N247 that won at Calshot in 1929 and S.6A N248, disqualified at Calshot in 1929), and the newly built S.6Bs, S1595 and S1596.

For the competition itself, only the S.6Bs and S.6As were intended to participate. The British plan for the Schneider contest was to have S1595 fly the course alone and, if its speed was not high enough, or the aircraft encountered mechanical failure, then the more-proven S.6A N248 would fly the course. If both S1595 and N248 failed in their attempts, then N247, which was planned to be held in reserve, would be used. The S.6B S1596 was then to attempt the world air speed record. During practice, N247 was destroyed in a takeoff accident, resulting in the death of the pilot, Lieut. G. L. Brinton, R.N., precluding any other plans with only the two S.6Bs and the sole surviving S.6A prepared to conduct the final Schneider run.

On 13 September 1931, the Schneider flight was performed by S.6B S1595, piloted by Flt. Lt. John Boothman, attaining a recorded top speed of 340.08 mph (547.19 km/h) and flying seven perfect laps of the triangular course over the Solent, the strait between the Isle of Wight and the British mainland. As the only contender it necessarily won, and the British record of wins entitled them to retain the Schneider trophy permanently. Seventeen days later, another historic flight was performed by S.6B S1596, flown by Flt Lt. George Stainforth, having broken the world air speed record by reaching a peak speed of 407.5 mph (655.67 km/h).

=== Legacy ===
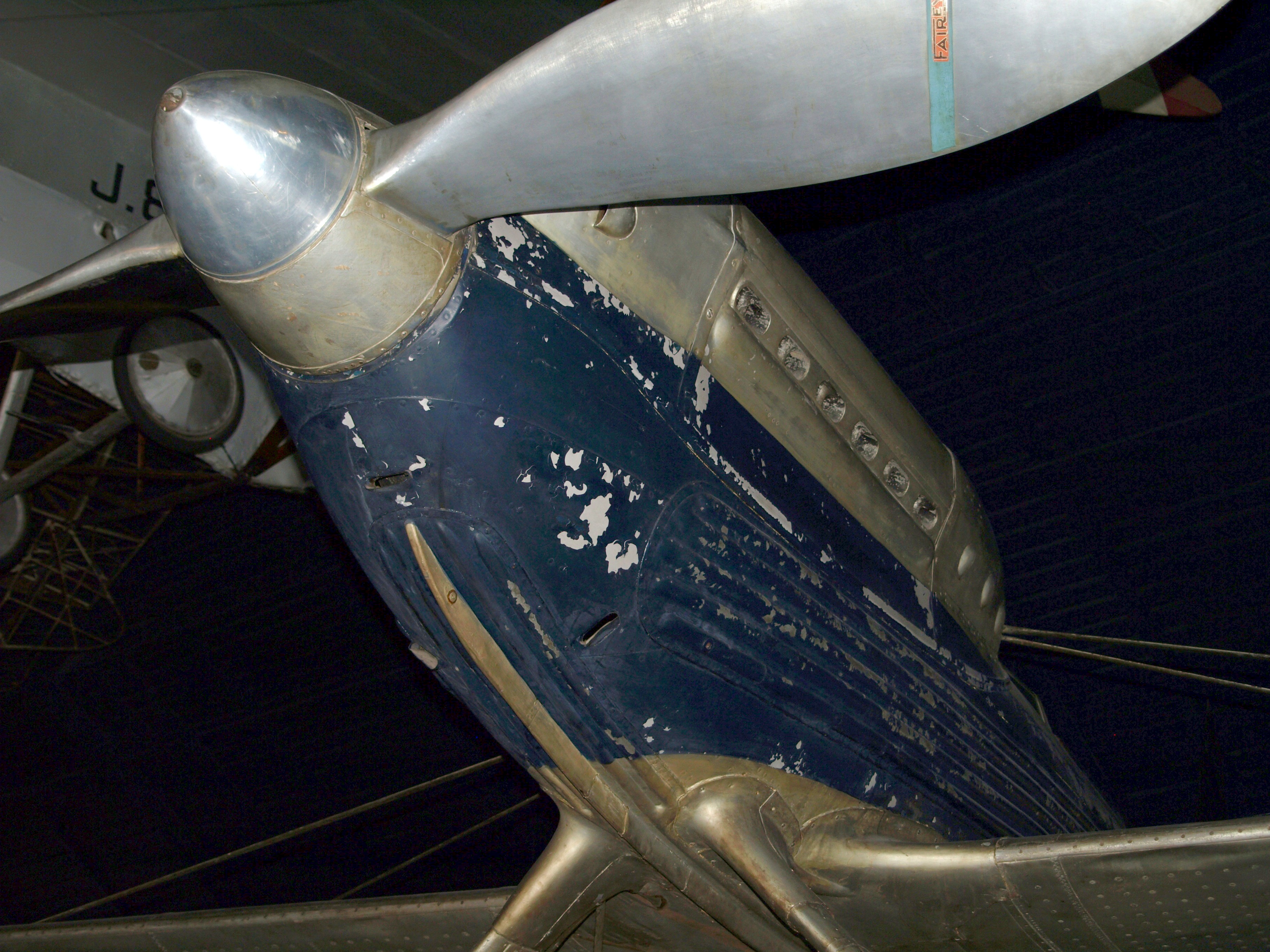
Forward fuselage and propeller detail of Supermarine S.6B, S1595 on display at the London Science Museum

The performance of the S.6B and its forerunners caused Mitchell to be recognised as a great designer of performance aircraft. The S.6B has been hailed as giving the impetus to the development of both the Supermarine Spitfire fighter aircraft and the Rolls-Royce Merlin engine that powered it. Neither Mitchell nor Supermarine would produce further racing aircraft for successive competitions as work on the development of a new fighter aircraft at the British government's behest had taken precedence.

Only 18 days after the S.6B's Schneider triumph the British Air Ministry issued Specification F7/30, which called for an all-metal land-based fighter aircraft and sought innovative solutions aiming at a major improvement in British fighter aircraft. The Ministry specifically invited Supermarine to participate. Accordingly, Mitchell's next endeavour after the S.6B was the design of the company's submission to meet this specification, designated the Type 224. While the Type 224 was a disappointment and was not selected for production, Supermarine's next project led to the development of the legendary Spitfire.

The outstanding performance of the S.6B had drawn the attention of not only British military officials and aircraft designers, but internationally as well, influencing new fighter projects in, amongst other nations, both Nazi Germany and the United States.

== Aircraft on display ==
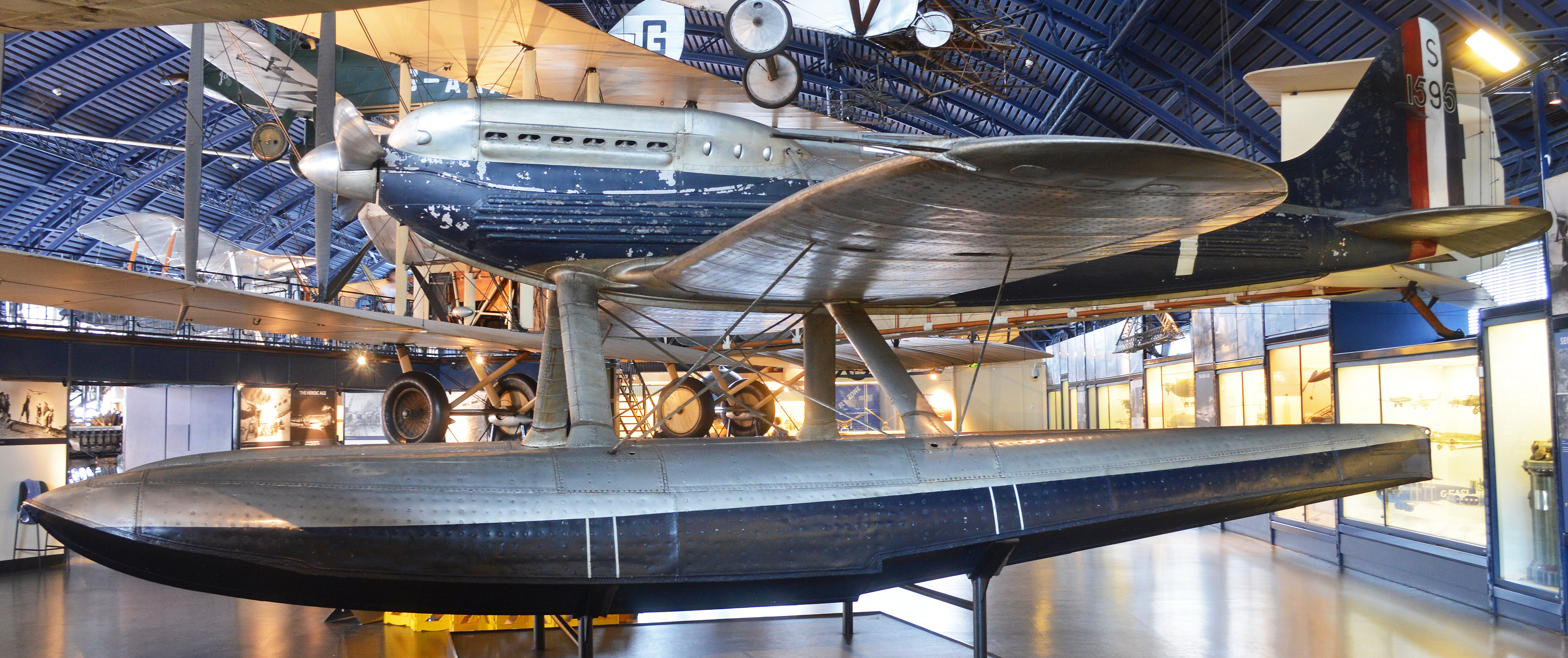
The S.6B on display at the London Science Museum

After the completion of the record-breaking flights, both S.6Bs were retired. The Schneider Trophy winning S.6B S1595 was donated to the Science Museum in London, where it is displayed in an unrestored state. For a short period of time, S1596 was tested at the Marine Aircraft Experimental Establishment (MAEE) at Felixstowe. but was unfortunately written off after a non-fatal crash in 1931.

Having been repainted in WW2 to represent S1596 in the film First of the Few, S.6A N248 remained in this guise postwar and was displayed as S1596 at various events and locations including the Southampton Royal Pier as a visitor attraction. Its true identity was finally revealed by the Southampton Hall of Aviation in the early 1980s and it was then repainted as N248.

== Operators ==
United Kingdom

- Royal Air Force
  - High Speed Flight

== Specifications (S.6B) ==
Supermarine S.6B

Data from Supermarine Aircraft since 1914.

General characteristics

- Crew: 1
- Length: 28 ft 10 in (8.79 m) including floats

25 ft 3 in (8 m) fuselage only

- Wingspan: 30 ft 0 in (9.14 m)
- Height: 12 ft 3 in (3.73 m)
- Wing area: 145 sq ft (13.5 m^{2})
- Airfoil: RAF 27
- Empty weight: 4,590 lb (2,082 kg)
- Gross weight: 6,086 lb (2,761 kg)
- Powerplant: 1 × Rolls-Royce R V-12 liquid-cooled piston engine, 2,350 hp (1,750 kW) at 3,200 rpm
- Propellers: 2-bladed fixed-pitch metal propeller

Performance

- Maximum speed: 407.5 mph (655.8 km/h, 354.1 kn) (World speed record)

390 mph (340 kn; 630 km/h) normal, in level flight

- Alighting speed: 95 mph (83 kn; 153 km/h)
- Wing loading: 42 lb/sq ft (210 kg/m^{2})
- Power/mass: 0.386 hp/lb (0.635 kW/kg)

== See also ==
Related development

- Supermarine S.4
- Supermarine S.5
- Supermarine S.6

Aircraft of comparable role, configuration, and era

- Macchi M.C.72

Related lists

- List of Schneider Trophy aircraft
