= Gloster VI =

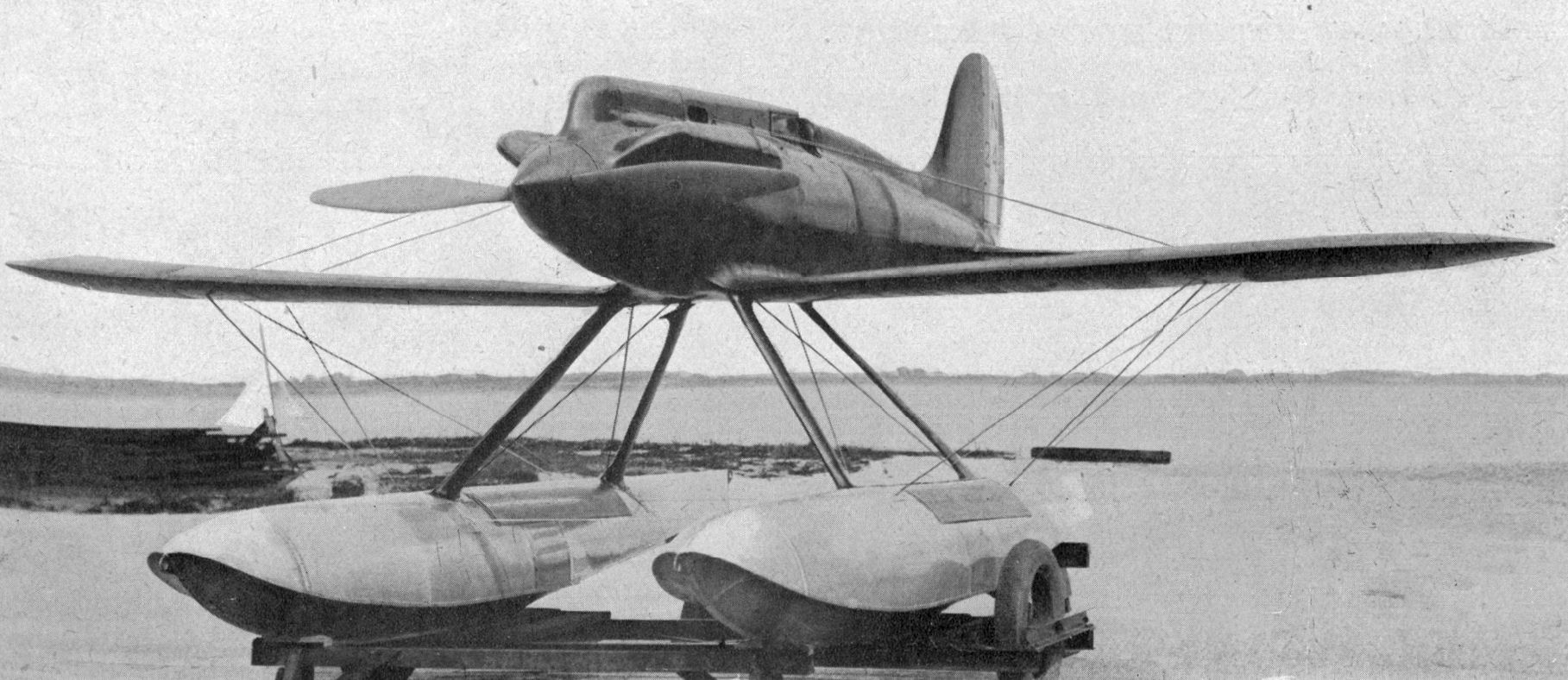

General information
- Type: Racing seaplane
- Manufacturer: Gloster
- Primary user: Royal Air Force, High Speed Flight
- Number built: 2

History
- Introduction date: 1929

The Gloster VI was a racing seaplane developed as a contestant for the 1929 Schneider Trophy by the Gloster Aircraft Company.

The aircraft was known as the Golden Arrow, partly in reference to its colour, the distinctive three-lobed cowling of the 'broad-arrow' Napier Lion engine, but also to another contemporary Lion-powered record-breaker, Henry Segrave's Golden Arrow land speed record car.

== Design and development ==
The Gloster VI was Gloster's final evolution of a series of racing floatplanes, designed specifically for the Schneider Trophy. It progressed from the Gloster II, through the successful Gloster III (placed 2nd in 1925), and Gloster IV biplanes. While Henry Folland, Gloster's chief designer commenced work on a further revised biplane, the Gloster V, to enter the 1929 competition, centre of gravity problems led to the design being discarded and this meant a monoplane configuration was chosen for the new design.

The Gloster VI was a low-winged braced monoplane. An obvious feature in photographs is the way that the wing roots tapered so as to reduce in thickness, designed to increase lateral control at low speeds. It retained the Napier Lion engine that had powered the previous Gloster racers, but with power boosted to 1,320 hp (985 kW) by supercharging. Engine cooling was via thin surface radiators on each wing.

== Operational history ==
Two aircraft, with serial numbers N249 & N250 were built, the first flying on 25 August 1929 and the second on 31 August. The aircraft showed promise and high speed but had problems with fuel supply when banking, which led to engine cut-outs. For such a risky business as low-altitude air-racing, this was an unacceptable risk and the aircraft were withdrawn from competition in the 1929 Schneider Trophy, leaving the way clear for the Supermarine S.6 to win. An alternative theory for the withdrawal is rumoured to have been an accident to the lorry delivering the engines from Napier and insufficient time to repair the damage until the day after.

On 10 September 1929, the day after the Supermarine S.6 had won the Trophy, N249 returned to flight. Flight Lieutenant George Stainforth flew it over a measured mile course for a top speed of 351.3 mph and a ratified world absolute speed record, averaged over four runs of 336.3 mph. This record was held only briefly, as a later run by Squadron Leader Augustus Orlebar in the S.6 managed to raise it over 350 mph. During the final Schneider Trophy in 1931, the Gloster VI was still in service with the High Speed Flight as a trainer.

== Operators ==
United Kingdom

- Royal Air Force, High Speed Flight

== Specifications ==
Data from

General characteristics

- Crew: 1
- Length: 27 ft 0 in (8.23 m) overall
- Wingspan: 26 ft 0 in (7.92 m)
- Height: 10 ft 9.5 in (3.289 m)
- Wing area: 106 sq ft (9.8 m^{2})
- Empty weight: 2,284 lb (1,036 kg)
- Gross weight: 3,680 lb (1,669 kg)
- Powerplant: 1 × Napier Lion VIID W-12 water-cooled supercharged piston engine, 1,320 hp (980 kW)
- Propellers: 2-bladed Gloster fixed-pitch propeller

Performance

- Maximum speed: 351.3 mph (565.4 km/h, 305.3 kn) the fastest speed run recorded on the world record course

336.3 mph (292.2 kn; 541.2 km/h) World speed record over four runs on a measured mile course

- Stall speed: 92 mph (148 km/h, 80 kn)
- Wing loading: 34.7 lb/sq ft (169 kg/m^{2})
- Power/mass: 0.36 hp/lb (0.59 kW/kg)

== See also ==
Aircraft of comparable role, configuration, and era

- Macchi M.52
- Supermarine S.6
