= Orlebar =

Orlebar is an English surname.

It may refer to:

- Augustus Orlebar (1897–1943), Royal Air Force officer
- Augustus Orlebar (cricketer) (1824–1912), English cricketer
- Christopher Orlebar (1945–2018), British Concorde pilot
- Diana Astry Orlebar (1671–1716), British diarist and compiler of recipes
- Eleanor E. Orlebar (1841–1906), English writer
- John Orlebar (1697–1765), British politician, MP for Bedford 1727–1734
