= Augustus Orlebar =

Royal Air Force Air Vice-Marshal (1897–1943)

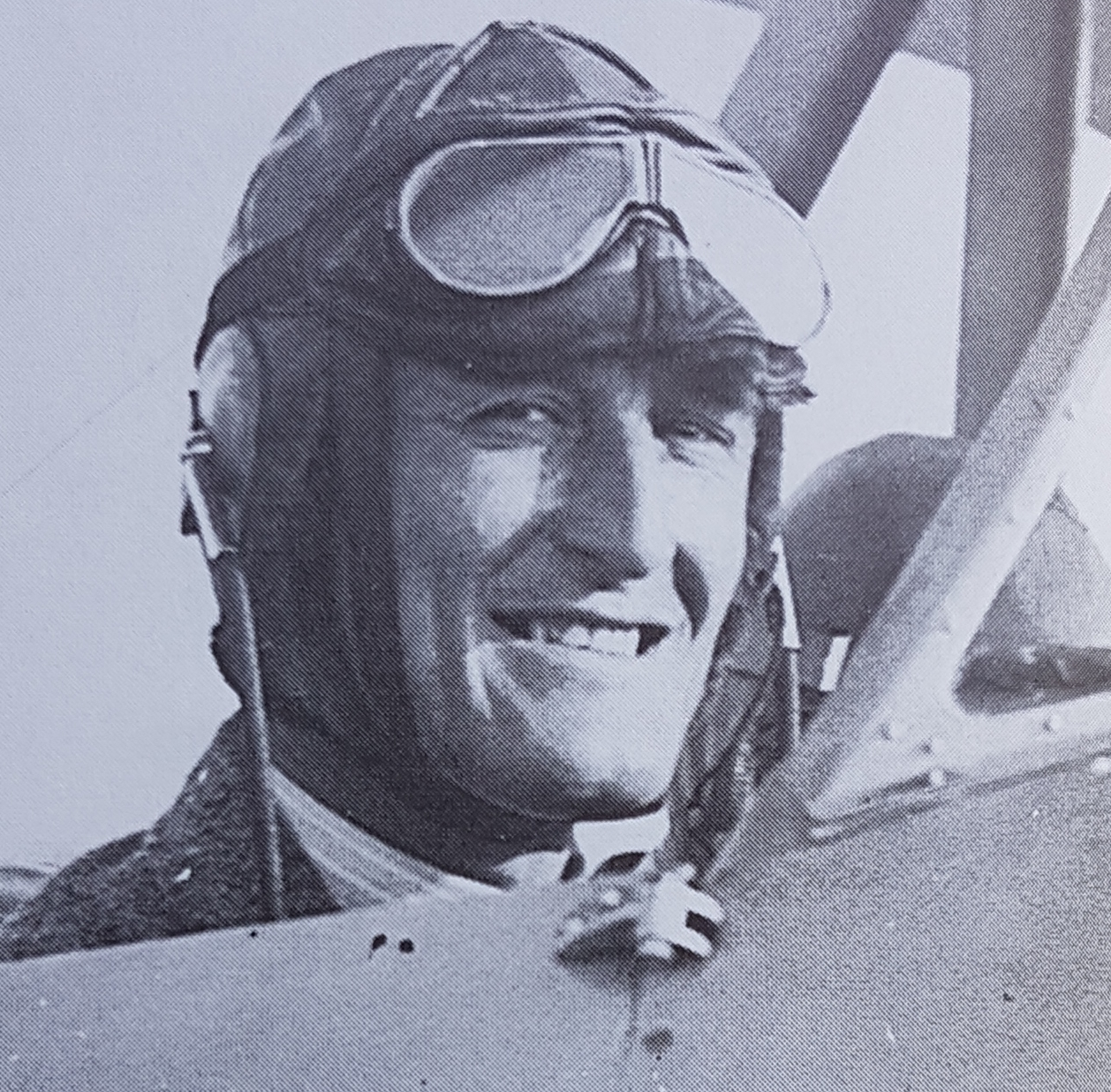
- Augustus H. Orlebar
- Born: 17 February 1897; Hinwick House, Podington, Bedfordshire
- Died: 4 August 1943 (aged 46)
- Burial place: St Mary's Church, Podington
- Military career
- Allegiance: United Kingdom
- Branch: British Army (1915–1918); Royal Air Force (1918–1943)
- Service years: 1915–1943
- Rank: Air Vice Marshal
- Units: Bedfordshire Regiment; Royal Flying Corps
- Commands: No. 10 (Fighter) Group; RAF Northolt; High Speed Flight RAF
- Conflicts: First World War: Gallipoli campaign; Western Front; Second World War
- Awards: Commander of the Order of the British Empire; Air Force Cross & Bar; Mentioned in Despatches

Air Vice Marshal Augustus Henry Orlebar, CBE, AFC & Bar (17 February 1897 – 4 August 1943) was a British Army and Royal Air Force officer who served in both world wars.

After being wounded during the Gallipoli campaign, Orlebar was seconded to the Royal Flying Corps and subsequently the Royal Air Force (RAF). He formally transferred to the RAF after the First World War and between the wars was involved in high speed flying, commanding the High Speed Flight RAF, competing in the Schneider Trophy, and holding the world air speed record.

By the outbreak of the Second World War Orlebar was in command of RAF Northolt. He briefly became Director of Flying Training in 1940 before going to HQ RAF Fighter Command. In July 1941 he became Air Officer Commanding, No. 10 (Fighter) Group, and in March 1943 Deputy Chief of Combined Operations. He fell ill, and died in hospital on 4 August 1943.

== Early life ==
Orlebar was the son of Augustus Scobell Orlebar and Hester Mary Orlebar, of Podington, Bedfordshire. The Orlebars were an old established family, having built Hinwick House almost 200 years earlier, after holding the manor since the mid-17th century. He was educated at Rugby School.

== First World War ==
Orlebar was commissioned as a second lieutenant in 1/5th Battalion, Bedfordshire Regiment (Territorial Force) on 15 January 1915. His battalion landed at Suvla Bay on 11 August 1915, pitching him into the Gallipoli campaign, He was promoted to temporary lieutenant on 21 September 1915, but was subsequently wounded in action by a sniper's bullet. He was then invalided to the United Kingdom and seconded to the Royal Flying Corps (RFC) on recovery.

Orlebar trained as a pilot in 1916 and was appointed a flying officer in the military wing of the RFC on 17 September 1916 when he was formally seconded from his regimental duties to the RFC. His rank of lieutenant was confirmed on 21 October. He was posted to No. 19 Squadron RFC on the Western Front. On 13 March 1918, he shot down and severely wounded Ltn. Lothar von Richthofen (brother of Manfred von Richthofen), near Cambrai. He was wounded in turn himself by Albatros scouts over Ham on 23 March 1918. Before his return to combat, he also served as an instructor in Essex.

Orlebar was credited with two enemy aircraft destroyed whilst serving with No 19 and a further four as a flight commander in No 73 Squadron, before being wounded. He gained his final victory with No. 43 Squadron on 29 September, bringing his total to seven.

== Inter-war service ==
Orlebar served as a test pilot at the Aeroplane and Armament Experimental Establishment (A&AEE), Martlesham Heath, between 1919 and 1925, being awarded the Air Force Cross in 1921 and the bar in 1929.

== Air racing ==
Orlebar was Officer Commanding and pilot with the High Speed Flight, the RAF's team for the Schneider Trophy seaplane races of 1927–1931. Britain, having won the 1927 race, became the subsequent host for the contests, which were based at RAF Calshot on the eastern entrance to Southampton Water.

In 1929 Orlebar set an air speed record of 357.7 mph in Supermarine S.6 N247.

The final contest was held in 1931, for a 3rd win gave the title to Britain in perpetuity. His report on the contest describes Flight Lieutenant George Stainforth's achievement of a new speed record at over 400 mph.

== Second World War ==
At the outbreak of the Second World War Orlebar was the Director of Flying Training before joining the Air Staff, HQ Fighter Command in October 1940. On 22 July 1941 he became Air Officer Commanding of No. 10 Group then the position of Deputy Chief of Combined Operations, at RAF Northolt from 2 March 1943. He died in hospital from natural causes after a short illness and is buried at his family church of Saint Mary's, Podington, Bedfordshire. He is commemorated on the War Memorial of the Church.

== Service career ==
=== Decorations ===
Air Force Cross – 2 Jan 1922, Bar – 3 Jun 1930, Mentioned in Despatches – 24 Sep 1941.

=== Ranks held ===
Army
Second Lieutenant	15 Jan 1915
Lieutenant Temporary	21 Sep 1915
Lieutenant	21 Oct 1916 [1 Jun 1916]
Captain Temporary	20 Dec 1917
RAF
Lieutenant	1 Apr 1918
Flight Lieutenant	1 Aug 1919 [1 Apr 1918]
Squadron Leader	1 Jul 1928
Wing Commander	1 Jan 1932
Group Captain	1 Jul 1937
Air Commodore Temporary	1 Feb 1940
Acting Air Vice Marshal	22 Jul 1941 – 1 Jan 1943
Air Commodore War substantive	22 Jul 1942
Air Commodore	1 Oct 1942 [22 Jul 1942]
Acting Air Vice Marshal	1 Mar 1943 – 21 Jun 1943

=== Service record ===
==== Army ====
15 Jan 1915	2nd Lt, 1/5th Territorial Btn. Bedfordshire Regiment (Gallipoli)

==== Royal Flying Corps ====
17 Sep 1916	Flying Officer, RFC
1916	Pilot, No. 19 Sqn. RFC	(BE12, Spad VII – Western Front)
1917	Pilot, No. 44 (Home Defence) Sqn. RFC	(Camel – Hainault farm)
19 Aug 1917	precedence backdated to 1 Jun 1916.
20 Dec 1917	Flight Commander, No. 73 Sqn. RFC	(Camel – Western Front)

==== RAF ====
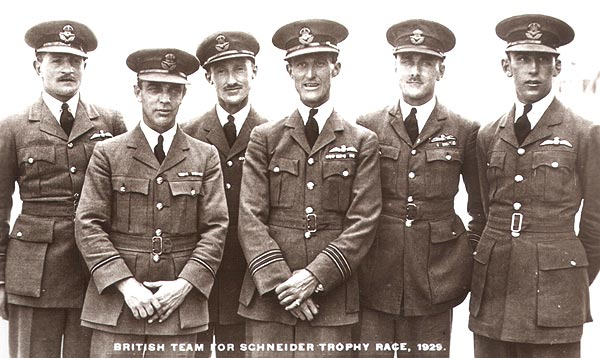
British team for 1929 Schneider Trophy Left to right: Fg Off HRD Waghorn Fg Off Moon (Engineering Officer) Flt Lt D D'Arcy A Greig Sqn Ldr AH Orlebar (Flight Commander) Flt Lt GH Stainforth Fg Off RLR Atcherley

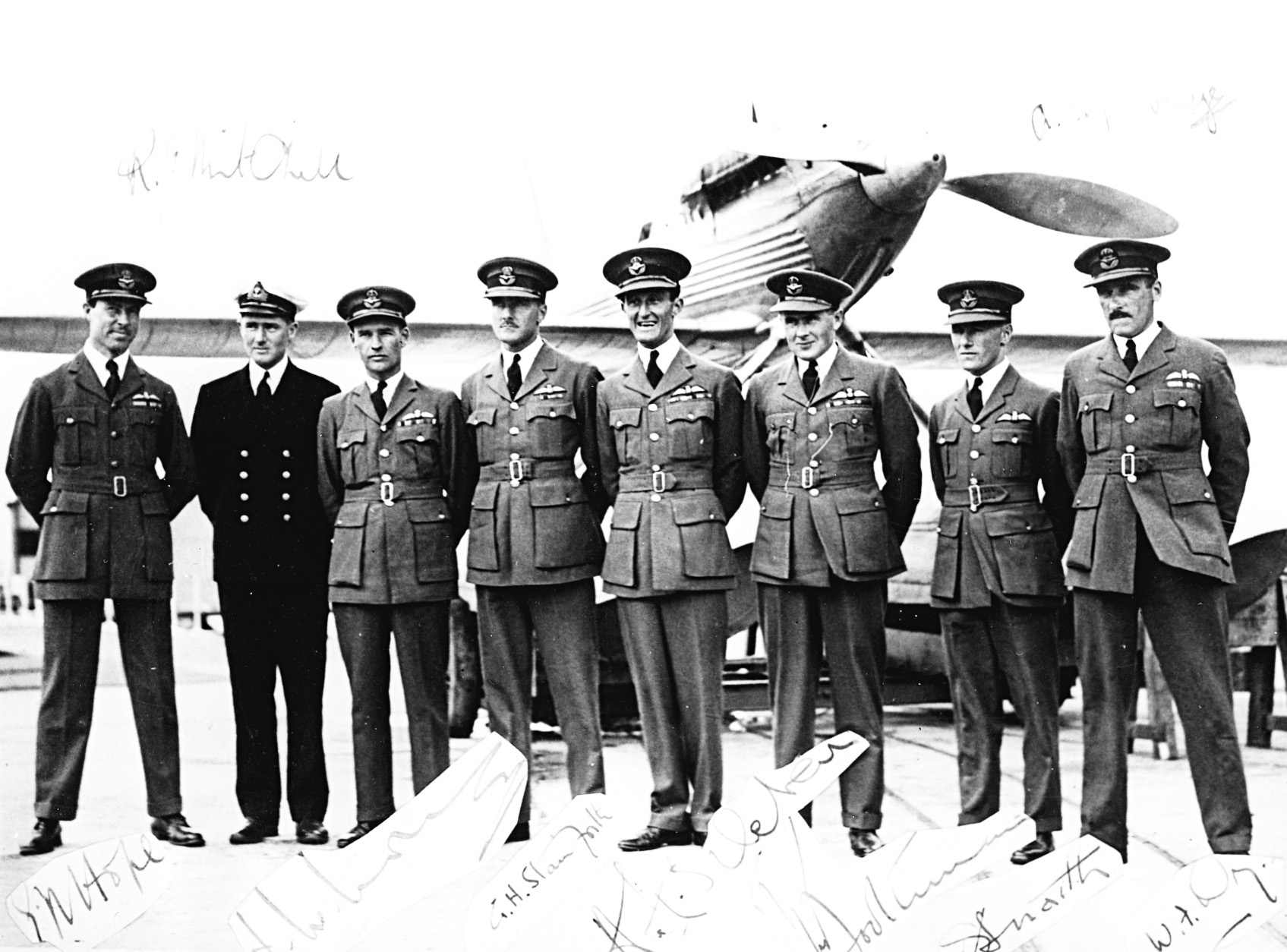
British team for 1931 Schneider Trophy Left to right: Flt Lt E.J.L. Hope Lt RL "Jerry" Brinton (Fleet Air Arm) Flt Lt Freddy Long Flt Lt George Stainforth Sqn Ldr AH Orlebar (Flight Commander) Flt Lt John Boothman Fg Off Leonard Snaith Flt Lt W.F. Dry (Engineering Officer) In the background is a Supermarine S.6B, or possibly a S.6A

1918	Instructor
Aug 1918	Flight Commander, No. 43 Squadron RAF	(Camel, Snipe – Western Front)
1 Jul 1919	Pilot, Aeroplane Experimental Station, Martlesham Heath.
1 Aug 1919	Relinquishes his commission in the Bedfordshire Regiment (retaining rank of Lieutenant)
28 Oct 1919	Granted a Permanent Commission in the rank of Flight Lieutenant (effective from 1 Aug)
16 Mar 1920	Pilot, at the renamed Aeroplane and Armament Experimental Establishment
24 Jul 1923	Flight Commander, No. 22 Sqn. Trials aircraft – Martlesham Heath
4 May 1925	Attended RAF Staff College
12 Apr 1926	Staff, HQ No. 22 Group
21 Sep 1926	supernumerary – awaiting disposal, HQ Iraq Command
3 Sep 1927	Staff, Deputy Directorate of Staff Duties.
9 Jan 1929	Test Pilot, Marine Aircraft Experimental Establishment
2 Dec 1929	Officer Commanding, Flying Boat Development Flight.
11 May 1931	Officer Commanding, RAF High Speed Flight.
2 Jan 1932	Staff, HQ No. 1 Air Defence Group
22 Sep 1933	Senior Air Staff Officer (SASO), HQ Aden Command
1 May 1936	Staff, Directorate of Staff Duties
12 Jan 1937	Attended Imperial Defence College
20 Dec 1937	Officer Commanding, RAF Northolt
15 Oct 1939	Duty Air Commodore, HQ RAF Fighter Command
29 Jul 1940	Director of Flying Training
15 Oct 1940	Air Staff, HQ RAF Fighter Command
22 Jul 1941	AOC, No. 10 (Fighter) Group
4 Nov 1942
2 Mar 1943	Deputy Chief of Combined Operations
