= Supermarine S.5 =

1920s British racing seaplane

S.5
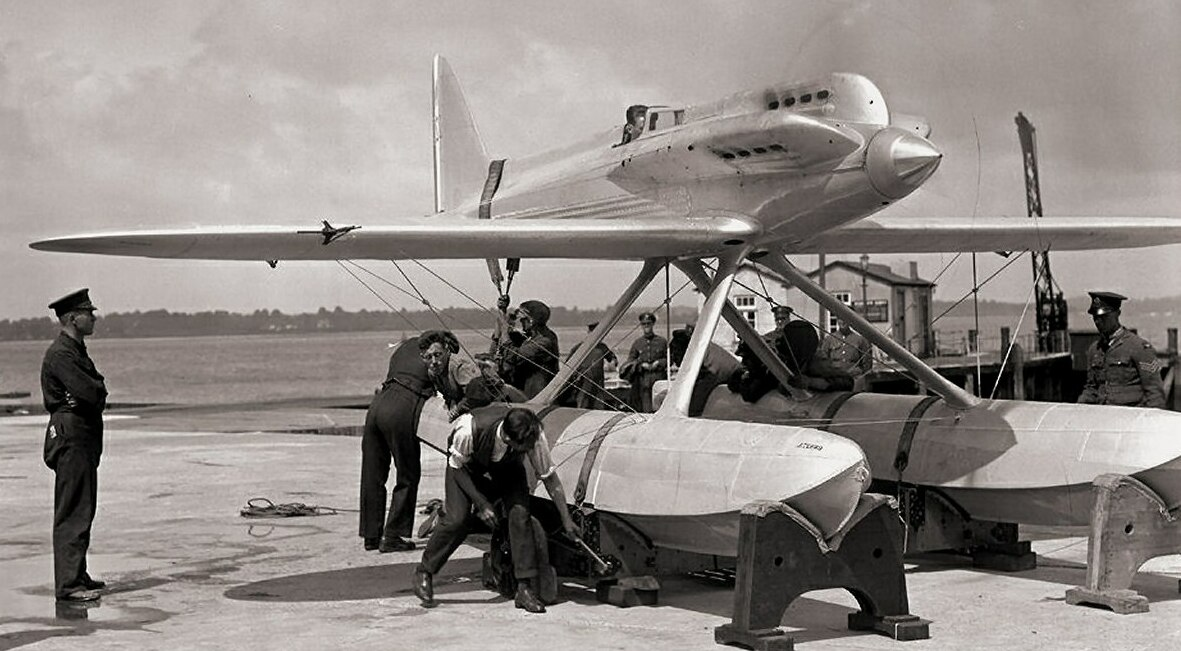
- The first S.5 (N219) at Calshot during preparations for the 1929 Schneider Trophy Contest

General information
- Type: Racing seaplane
- National origin: United Kingdom
- Manufacturer: Supermarine
- Designer: Reginald Mitchell
- Primary user: Royal Air Force High Speed Flight
- Number built: 3

History
- Introduction date: 1927
- First flight: 7 June 1927
- Developed from: Supermarine S.4

The Supermarine S.5 was a 1920s British single-engined single-seat racing seaplane built by Supermarine. Designed specifically for the Schneider Trophy competition, the S.5 was the progenitor of a line of racing aircraft that ultimately led to the iconic Supermarine Spitfire fighter of the Second World War

The S.5 was designed by Reginald Mitchell after the loss of the S.4 before it ever raced. It featured extensive changes from the S.4, possessing numerous unconventional features and making greater use of metal; many of these decisions were made to optimise its racing performance. Due to the short development window, a wooden wing was used rather than an all-metal one. In particular, it possessed a relatively low level of drag for the era.

On 7 June 1927, the first S.5 performed its maiden flight; a total of three aircraft were built. Two S.5s came in 1st and 2nd places at the 1927 Schneider Trophy contest; the type would also participate in the event during subsequent years. On 12 March 1928, one S.5 fatally crashed during an attempt on the world air speed record, killing the pilot Flight Lieutenant Samuel Kinkead. During the 1970s, a full-scale flight-worthy S.5 replica was constructed.

== Design and development ==
The Supermarine S.5 was designed by Reginald Mitchell for the 1927 Schneider Trophy. Following the earlier loss of the S.4 before the 1925 Schneider Trophy was held, Mitchell designed a new monoplane racer. Extensive changes were made between the S.4 and S.5, the principal goal of which was to achieve greater speeds. The design process was heavily influenced by wind tunnel testing, the resulting information from which was kept confidential for some time. The S.5 possessed a particularly low level of drag for a floatplane of the era. Furthermore, the resulting aircraft possessed numerous unorthodox features, some of which were developed to meet specific conditions encountered during high speed air races.

The fuselage of the S.5 was entirely composed of metal, primarily duralumin; the strength of this material enabled the use of semi-monocoque construction, an arrangement that substantially reduced the amount of space taken up by the fuselage. In turn, the cross section of the fuselage could be minimised, to the extent that the pilot was seated on the floor of the fuselage while their shoulders were in contact with the metal skin of the fuselage. Structural elements within the fuselage included loosely-spaced flat U-section formers throughout its length that worked in conjunction with the skin, which functioned as longerons within the stress-resisting structure; in key areas, it was reinforced using fore-and-aft stringers. The forward section of the fuselage had particularly strong frames in order to appropriately support the wing roots, undercarriage struts and function as the attachment point for the anti-lift wire bracing. The latter feature was particularly crucial to the stability of the bracing of both the wings and the sizable floats fitted.

The aircraft was fitted with single-step floats; their structure comprised central longitudinal bulkheads that directly attached to the transverse frames. Several of the longitudinal members were placed between the frames. They were almost entirely composed of duralumin, the centre section of the starboard float was made of steel to permit it to support the primary fuel tank. As there was no room for a fuel tank within the fuselage, all of the aircraft's fuel was carried within the starboard float, which was 8 inches (20 cm) closer to the aircraft's centreline than the port float; this arrangement gave the aircraft a lower centre of gravity as well as helping to offset engine torque.

Largely due to a lack of available experimentation time during the aircraft's short development window, the use of an all-metal wing was discounted. Instead, proven wooden construction was used for the wire-braced wings, which possessed spruce spars, spruce-ply ribs and a smooth plywood covering. They were built in two halves along a conventional twin-spar arrangement, albeit with a diagonal member between the wing tips and the fittings for the streamlined bracing wires which stiffened the wing against torsion and reduced the likelihood of encountering aeroelastic flutter. Large radiators were present on the wings; positioned tightly against the wings, they were of a relatively low weight as to avoid incurring excessive wing loading.

The engine was cooled via a somewhat unusual arrangement, using radiators located on the wings in place of the Lamblin type radiators of the S.4; these radiators were made up of corrugated copper sheets and covered a large proportion of the wing surface. Particular attention was paid to the oil system with the aim of minimising fractional losses in the propeller gearing and maximising the aircraft's speed potential. As traditional arrangements were deemed to be insufficient, the oil was cooled via a series of corrugated steel radiators positioned on either side of the fuselage; further cooling of the gears themselves was achieved via several opening in the cowlings of the cylinder block.

The forward bottom portion of the fuselage was reinforced using laminated duralumin to function as the engine bearer, comprising two primary box section bearers that were secured to cradles. One advantage of the scoop-formed engine mounting was a relatively high level of accessibility to the engine. The engine itself was cleanly faired into the fuselage to maximise aerodynamic efficiency.

The flight controls were of a conventional nature, lacking any implementation of variable gearing except for in the actuation of the ailerons. The aircraft was considered to be relatively easy to handle considering its relatively high top speed for the era. The horizontal tail surfaces, which were made of wood, had their control cranks housed within the stern portion of the fuselage; the cranks for the elevator were intentionally offset so they would sufficiently clear the rudder post.

A total of three aircraft were built, one with a direct drive 900 hp (670 kW) Napier Lion VIIA engine, and the other two with a geared 875 hp (652 kW) Napier Lion VIIB engine.

== Operational history ==
The first aircraft performed its maiden flight on 7 June 1927. The S.5s came 1st and 2nd in the 1927 Schneider Trophy race held at Venice; the winning aircraft (Serial number N220) was flown by Flight Lieutenant Sidney Webster at an average speed of 281.66 mph (453.29 km/h).

One S.5, N221, crashed on 12 March 1928 during an attempt on the world air speed record, killing the pilot Flight Lieutenant Samuel Kinkead, who had flown the Gloster IV in the 1927 Schneider Trophy Race.

Concern over the unreliability of the supercharged Lion powering the Gloster VI led to the High Speed Flight entering one S.5 (N219, fitted with a geared Lion engine for the event) along with the two S.6s for the 1929 Schneider contest. The S.5, flown by Flight Lieutenant D'Arcy Greig, finished third in 46 minutes and 15 seconds at a speed of 282.11 mph (454.01 km/h), behind the winning S.6 flown by Flying Officer H. Richard Waghorn and a Macchi M.52.

== Replica ==
Ray Hilborne of Leisure Sports designed and built a full-scale S.5 replica which flew for the first time on 28 August 1975. The replica, powered by a Continental IO-360, used an all-wood construction and incorporated modifications to the wing to lower the stalling speed, water rudders, a slightly wider cockpit and overall weight reduction to an all-up weight of just 1,500 lb (680 kg), less than half that of the S.5.

== Popular culture ==
In the song "Bill Hosie" by Archie Fisher, the protagonist rebuilds a Supermarine S.5 that survived the 1927 Schneider Trophy contest. The aircraft, race, and trophy are referred to throughout the song.

== Operators ==
United Kingdom

- Royal Air Force
  - High Speed Flight

== Specifications (N220) ==
Data from Supermarine Aircraft since 1914, National Advisory Committee for Aeronautics

General characteristics

- Crew: 1
- Length: 24 ft 3.5 in (7.404 m)
- Wingspan: 26 ft 9 in (8.15 m)
- Height: 11 ft 1 in (3.38 m)
- Wing area: 115 sq ft (10.7 m^{2})
- Airfoil: RAF 30
- Empty weight: 2,680 lb (1,216 kg)
- Gross weight: 3,242 lb (1,471 kg)
- Powerplant: 1 × Napier Lion VIIA W-12 liquid-cooled piston engine, 900 hp (670 kW)
- Propellers: 2-bladed fixed-pitch propeller

Performance

- Maximum speed: 319.57 mph (514.30 km/h, 277.70 kn)

== See also ==
- Schneider Trophy

Related development

- Supermarine S.4 • S.6/S.6A • S.6B

Related lists

- RAF aircraft
