= Sidney Webster =

- Born: 19 March 1900; Walsall, England
- Died: 5 April 1984 (aged 84)
- Military career
- Allegiance: United Kingdom
- Branch: Royal Air Force
- Service years: 1918–1950
- Rank: Air Vice Marshal
- Nickname: Webbie
- Unit: High Speed Flight RAF
- Commands: RAF Hong Kong
- Conflicts: Second World War
- Awards: Commander of the Order of the British Empire; Air Force Cross & Bar

Air Vice Marshal Sidney Norman Webster, CBE, AFC & Bar (19 March 1900 – 5 April 1984) was a senior officer in the Royal Air Force and an aviator who flew the winning aircraft in the 1927 Schneider Trophy seaplane race.

== Early life ==
Sidney Norman Webster was born in Walsall on 9 March 1900. He joined the Royal Air Force in September 1918 and trained as a pilot. He was awarded the Air Force Cross in 1921. In 1927 he was selected as part of the British team to contest the 1929 Schneider Trophy.

From 1925 to 1930, Webster was posted to RAF Martlesham in Suffolk. An accomplished soccer player, who represented Walsall schools, Webster was picked up by Ipswich Town – then in the southern amateur League – and went on to play 69 times for them, mostly at left-back, including as club captain for one season.

== Schneider Trophy ==
After training Webster and the British team moved to Venice, Italy to prepare for the race against Italy, and the United States. The race was held on 26 September 1927 and was won by Webster flying his Supermarine S.5 single-engined seaplane at an average speed of 281.66 mph (453 km/h). After winning the trophy Webster was awarded a Bar to his Air Force Cross. The citation for the award read:

The King has been graciously pleased to approve the award of a Bar to the Air Force Cross held by Flight Lieutenant Sidney Norman Webster, AFC, in recognition of his achievement winning the recent "Schneider Cup" Air Race.

— London Gazette

Webster left the High Speed Flight and after a tour as a flight commander in 1933 he was seconded to the Egyptian Government until 1939.

== Second World War ==
Webster used his experience of high speed flight as he acted as a liaison officer between the Air Ministry and various aircraft manufacturers in the United Kingdom. In 1944 he moved to the Marine Aircraft Experimental Establishment as commanding officer. He was appointed a Commander of the Order of the British Empire in the 1946 New Year Honours.

== Post-war ==
After the war Webster had two tours of duty with Coastal Command in between he was Air Officer Commanding RAF Hong Kong, he retired in 1950.
