= Gloster II =

1920s British sport floatplane

General information
- Type: Racing seaplane
- National origin: United Kingdom
- Manufacturer: Gloster Aircraft Company
- Designer: Henry Folland
- Number built: 2

History
- First flight: 19 September 1924
- Developed from: Gloster I

The Gloster II was a British racing floatplane of the 1920s. A single-engined biplane, two were built to compete in the 1924 Schneider Trophy air race. However the crash of the first prototype during testing meant that it could not be made ready for the race, which was postponed. The second aircraft was also lost in a crash.

== Design and development ==
The 1923 Schneider Trophy race for seaplanes had been won by the United States Navy with the Curtiss CR-3, a floatplane which outclassed Britain's entry, the Supermarine Sea Lion III flying boat. In a change from previous years, where Britain's entries had been privately funded, the British Air Ministry ordered two racing seaplanes from the Gloster Aircraft Company to compete for the 1924 race.

The resulting aircraft, designated the Gloster II, was a floatplane development of Gloster's earlier Gloster I racing aircraft, which had won the annual Aerial Derby air race three years running between 1921 and 1923, and had attempted unsuccessfully to break the World airspeed record in 1922. It was a small single-seat biplane of fabric covered wooden construction, powered by a closely faired Napier Lion engine. It had short-span single bay wings and a twin float undercarriage, with radiators mounted on the struts supporting the floats.

The first aircraft, with the serial number J7504, was ready for flight testing in September 1924. However, when attempting to land after its first test flight, on 19 September 1924, the undercarriage collapsed and the aircraft sank, with pilot Hubert Broad escaping unhurt. There was insufficient time to prepare the second aircraft for the race, scheduled for October, but as no other European nation had an entry ready to compete, the Americans postponed the race until 1925.

The second aircraft was converted to a landplane and used for flight testing equipment to be used for the Gloster III racer being designed for the 1925 competition. It was lost in a high-speed crash landing at RAF Cranwell following elevator flutter in June 1925, the pilot, Larry Carter, being seriously injured, fracturing his skull.

== Specifications (Gloster II seaplane) ==
Data from Gloster Aircraft since 1917

General characteristics

- Crew: 1
- Length: 26 ft 10 in (8.18 m)
- Wingspan: 20 ft 0 in (6.10 m)
- Height: 11 ft 0 in (3.35 m)
- Wing area: 165 sq ft (15.3 m^{2})
- Empty weight: 2,500 lb (1,134 kg)
- Gross weight: 3,100 lb (1,406 kg)
- Powerplant: 1 × Napier Lion VA W-12 water-cooled piston engine, 585 hp (436 kW)
- Propellers: 2-bladed fixed-pitch propeller

Performance

- Maximum speed: 225 mph (362 km/h, 196 kn)
- Wing loading: 18.8 lb/sq ft (92 kg/m^{2})
- Power/mass: 0.19 hp/lb (0.31 kW/kg)

== See also ==
- Schneider Trophy

Related development

- Gloster I
- Gloster III
- Gloster IV

Aircraft of comparable role, configuration, and era

- Curtiss CR
