= Supermarine S.6 =

1920s British racing seaplane

S.6
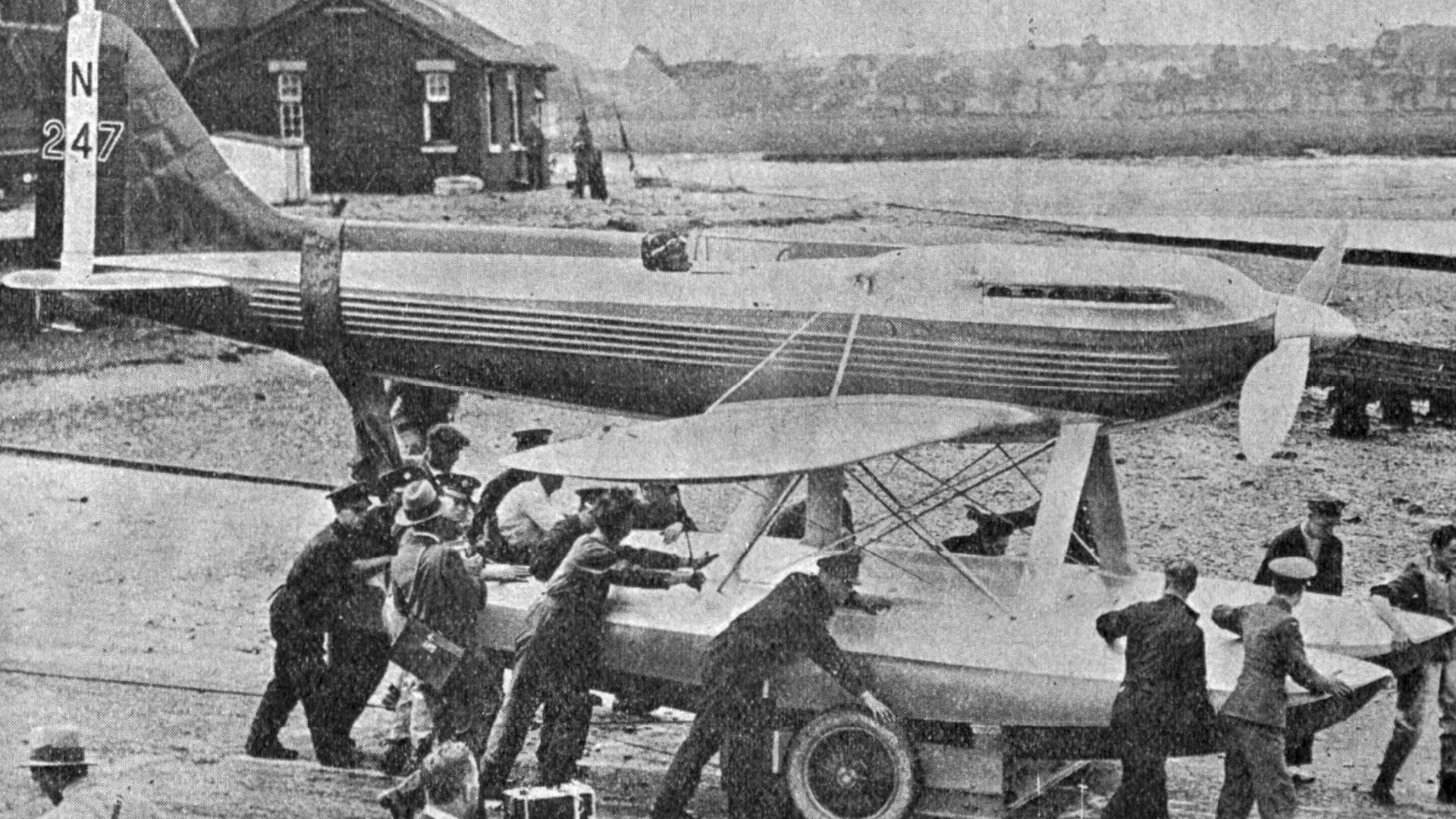
- N247 in September 1929

General information
- Other name: S.6A
- Type: Racing seaplane
- National origin: United Kingdom
- Manufacturer: Supermarine
- Designer: Team led by R.J. Mitchell
- Service: Royal Air Force High Speed Flight
- Number built: 2

History
- First flight: 1929
- Retired: 1931
- Successors: Supermarine S.6B

The Supermarine S.6 (later designated the S.6A) is a 1920s British single-engined single-seat racing seaplane built by Supermarine and designed by its chief designer, R.J. Mitchell, who refined the earlier Supermarine S.5 to produce a larger, more powerful aircraft. Two aircraft, N247 and N248, were built to participate in the 1929 Schneider Trophy contest. Rolls-Royce produced the R engine for the new all-metal aircraft. The engine's initial issues—such as the short time between overhauls and the heat generated when the engine power was increased to 1,900 hp (1,400 kW)—were resolved within a few months before the aircraft were completed at Supermarine’s works at Woolston, Southampton.

The day before the 1929 race, one of N247's pistons was discovered to be faulty; the piston was replaced during the night. The race on the following day was won by the British team, with N247 coming first at a speed of 328.63 miles per hour (528.88 km/h), whilst N248 set World closed-circuit records for 50 and 100 kilometres (31 and 62 mi). For the 1931 race, the S.6 was redesigned as the Supermarine S.6B, to take a more powerful version of the R engine. The two existing S.6s were brought up to a similar standard as the S.6Bs, but N247 was destroyed prior to the contest during a fatal accident. The S.Bs were retired after the 1931 contest. The surviving S.6A is on display at the Solent Sky museum in Southampton.

== Design and development ==
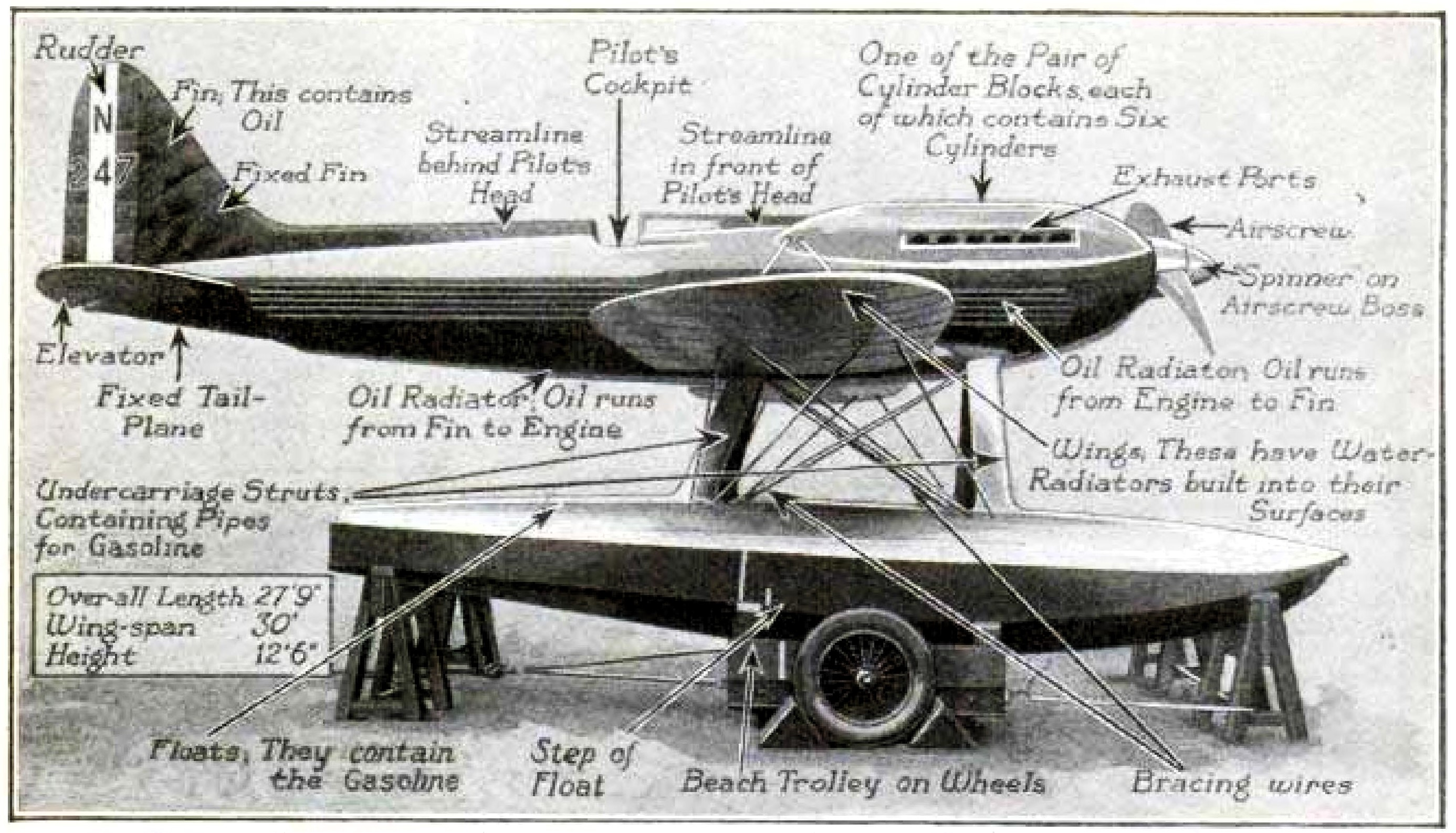
An illustration of the S.6 from Popular Mechanics (December, 1929)

Following the success of the Supermarine S.5 in the 1927 Schneider Trophy contest. Supermarine's chief designer R.J. Mitchell designed its successor, the Supermarine S.6, to Specification 8/28. (Note: The order for the aircraft was placed on 3 May, 1929, under contract S27042/28.) Refining the design of the earlier S.5, Mitchell designed a larger all-metal aircraft. The metal-framed wings of the S.6 were designed to be made using aluminium, so as to assist in reducing the overall weight of the aircraft. To achieve the required lift, the wings were made to be 3 feet (0.91 m) longer than those of the lighter S.5.

The aircraft industry during the First World War had used up nearly all the world supply of seasoned spruce, a requirement for wooden aeroplanes at that time, and so the ability to produce metal-built aircraft for any future conflict was deemed by the British government to be essential.

An innovation by Mitchell was the use of duralumin radiators on the surface of the wings. Made both to withstand forces that tended to cause the wings to twist, and to minimise air resistance, they were made of two thicknesses of metal that allowed water to pass between them.

=== Rolls-Royce R engine ===
As the 875 horsepower (650 kW) Napier Lion VIIB engine was judged by Supermarine to be incapable of further development, in February 1929, the British Government signalled to Rolls-Royce that they could proceed with producing the R engine for Supermarine. The engine, an adaptation of the Rolls-Royce Buzzard, (Note: The changes made to the Buzzard involved the inclusion of a new supercharger, the strengthening of the engine to deal with greater mechanical stresses, and modifications to enable the engine to fit the streamlined shape of the S.6.) was designed and manufactured by 4 May, but this machine was found to overheat after 15 minutes. By the middle of July, many of the engine's initial problems had been resolved, but the valves were still causing problems. The time between overhauls was able to be lengthened to five hours when the fuel was diluted, and the engine power was able to be increased to 1,900 hp (1,400 kW) at a frequency of 3,000 rpm. The engine needed 160 imperial gallons (730 L; 190 US gal) of petrol to complete a race, as it consumed fuel at a rate of 3.6 imp gal/min (0.27 litres per second). By July 1928, Mitchell had been given drawings of the engine from Rolls-Royce, which he used to work on improving the aerodynamic qualities of the aircraft.

To help alleviate problems of engine cooling caused by the high rate of heat generation, the S.6 had surface radiators built into the floats as well as on the wings. Additional cooling was provided by means of air flowing through the internal structure of the wings. The new engine weighed 1,530 pounds (690 kg), a weight that meant that it had to be better supported by moving the float struts forward by a slight amount. The increase in fuel consumption meant that both floats had to incorporate steel fuel tanks.

In February 1929, Supermarine was authorised to build two machines for the 1929 contest. The aircraft (with designated serial numbers N247 and N248) were built together at their works at Woolston, Southampton.

== Operational history ==
The 1929 Schneider Trophy course

The two S.6s were delivered to Calshot in August 1929 for operation by the RAF High Speed Flight. N247 first flew on 10 August, and N248 a fortnight later. Soon after N247 arrived at Calshot, it was found that one of the floats was so low in the water on take-off that it made the aircraft rotate on the surface. Ripples were sufficient to enable N247 to become airborne. An issue with overheating was sorted by installing extra radiators.

When a British entrant, a Gloster VI was forced by engine trouble to be withdrawn, the only two British entrants that remained were the S.6s, and so the S.5 (N219) was prepared for the contest. During a final check of N247, a speck of metal was discovered on a spark plug, which revealed a faulty piston. It was forbidden for the entire engine to be replaced once it was installed, but components could be changed prior to the race. The engine block was changed during the night—by specialist Rolls-Royce engineers from a party who happened to have come down to Southampton from Derby to watch the race—so that the engine was running smoothly by the start of the next day.

The 1929 Schneider Trophy race took place off the English coast north of the Isle of Wight, under ideal weather conditions, and with at least a million people assembled along the beaches to witness the event. N247, piloted by Flying Officer H.R.D. Waghorn, came first at a speed of 328.63 miles per hour (528.88 km/h). N248 was disqualified when it turned inside one of the marker poles, but nonetheless, set World closed-circuit records for 50 and 100 kilometres (31 and 62 mi) during its run. Following the victory, the British Prime Minister Ramsay MacDonald publicly pledged official support for the 1931 contest, a decision that was later reversed by the government.

For the 1931 Schneider Trophy race, also to be held at Calshot, the S.6 was adapted to take a more powerful 2,350 horsepower (1,750 kW) version of the R engine. Two new aircraft, designated the Supermarine S.6B, were built. The two existing S.6s, now designated as S.6As, were provided with new floats, additional cooling areas and statically-balanced control surfaces. All four aircraft were brought up to a similar standard. During the initial flight of the improved N247 on 2 June, the pilot experience dangerous levels of tail flutter (a form of resonance), which was only alleviated when masses were fixed to the rudder.

The British plan for the 1931 contest was to fly one of the S.6Bs, S1595, around the course alone, with N248 in reserve. If both S1595 and N248 failed in their attempts, N247 would be used. However, N247, flown by Navy Lieutenant G.N. Brinton, was destroyed in a fatal takeoff accident during a pre-contest training exercise. N248 remained as part of the team but did not fly in the race. S1595 went on to win a race in which only British aircraft participated.

== Aircraft on display ==
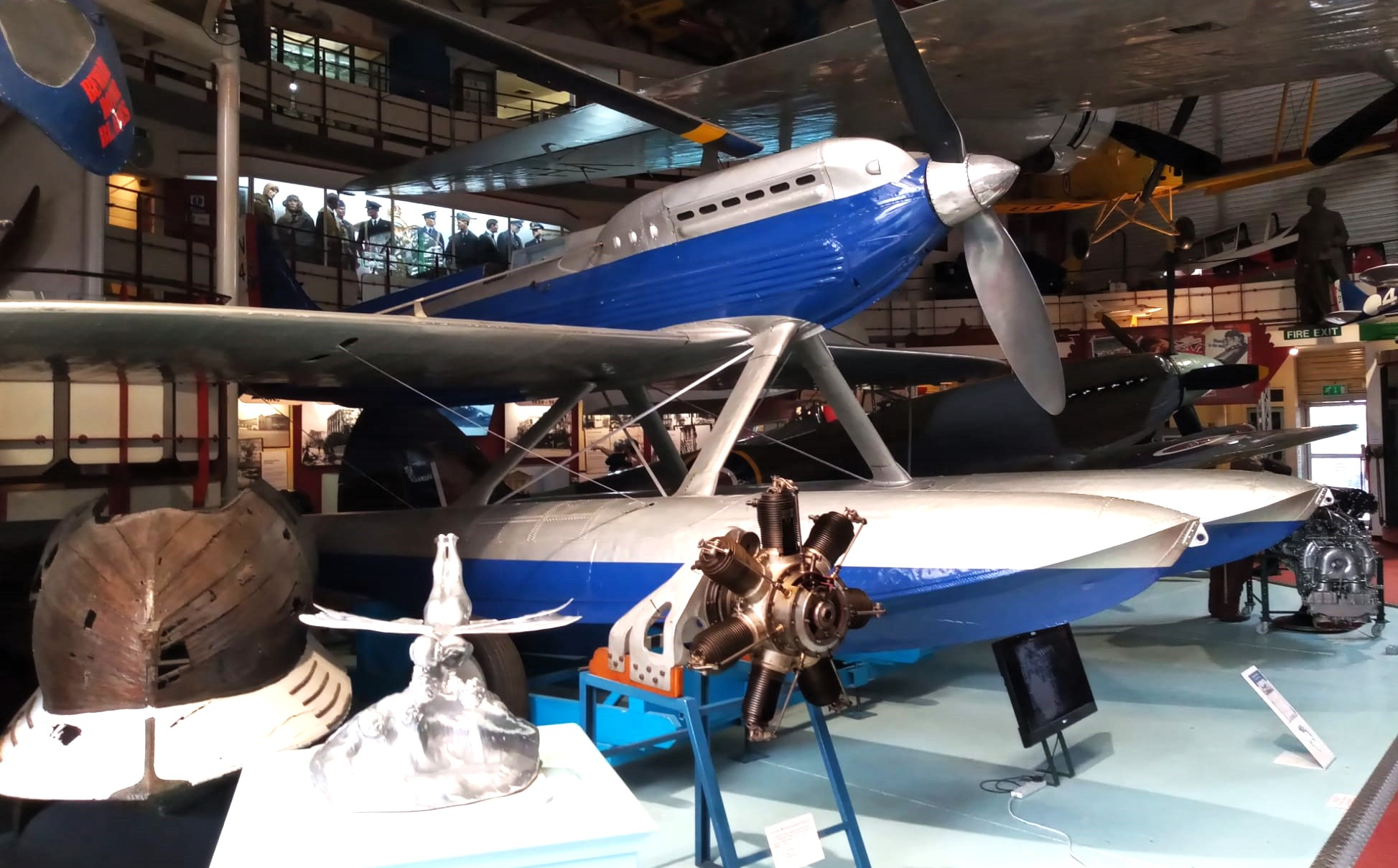
The surviving Supermarine S.6 (N248) at the Solent Sky museum in Southampton

N248 was used in the 1942 British biographical film about Mitchell, The First of the Few. Until the 1960s, the aircraft was displayed incorrectly as S.6B S1596 as a visitor attraction in a building adjacent to the Royal Pier, Southampton. The S.6A was restored from 1983 onwards, and repainted in its original 1931 scheme. It can be seen on display at the Solent Sky museum in Southampton.

== Operators ==
United Kingdom

- Royal Air Force
  - High Speed Flight

== Specifications (N247) ==
Data from Supermarine Aircraft since 1914 (1981)

General characteristics

- Crew: 1
- Length: 25 ft 10 in (7.87 m) overall; 25 ft 3 in (7.70 m) fuselage only
- Wingspan: 30 ft 0 in (9.14 m)
- Height: 12 ft 3 in (3.73 m)
- Wing area: 145 sq ft (13.5 m^{2})
- Airfoil: RAF 27
- Empty weight: 4,471 lb (2,028 kg)
- Gross weight: 5,771 lb (2,618 kg)
- Powerplant: 1 × Rolls-Royce R V-12 liquid-cooled piston engine, 1,900 hp (1,400 kW) at 2,900 rpm for one hour
- Propellers: 2-bladed fixed-pitch propeller

Performance

- Maximum speed: 357.7 mph (575.7 km/h, 310.8 kn) (World speed record at the time)
- Alighting speed: 95 mph (83 kn; 153 km/h)

== See also ==
Related development

- Supermarine S.5
- Supermarine S.6B

Related lists

- List of aircraft of the Royal Air Force
- List of Schneider Trophy aircraft

== Sources ==
- Andrews, Charles Ferdinand; Morgan, Eric B. (1981). Supermarine Aircraft since 1914. London: Putnam. ISBN 978-03701-0-018-0.
- Eves, Edward; Coombs, L. F. E (2001). The Schneider Trophy Story. St. Paul, Minnesota: MBI. ISBN 978-07603-1-118-9.
- Glancey, Jonathan (2020). Wings Over Water: The Story of the World's Greatest Air Race and the Birth of the Spitfire. Atlantic Books. ISBN 978-17864-9-420-7.
- Green, William, ed. (1967). "Supermarine's Schneider Seaplanes". Flying Review International. Vol. 10, no. 11.
- National Advisory Committee for Aeronautics (1931). "NASA Technical Reports Server (NTRS) 19930090264: The Supermarine S.6.B. Racing Seaplane (British) : A Low-Wing Twin-Float Monoplane". Washington, D.C.: NASA.
- James, Derek N. (1981). Schneider Trophy Aircraft 1913–1931. London: Putnam. ISBN 978-0-370-30328-4.
- Mitchell, Gordon (2002). R.J. Mitchell: Schooldays to Spitfire. Tempus. ISBN 978-07524-2-322-7.
- Shelton, John K. (2008). Schneider Trophy to Spitfire: The Design Career of R.J. Mitchell (Hardback). Sparkford: Hayes Publishing. ISBN 978-1-84425-530-6.
- Shelton, John K. (2015). From Nighthawk to Spitfire: The Aircraft of R.J. Mitchell. Stroud, UK: History Press. ISBN 978-07509-6-550-7.
