= Supermarine Sea Lion III =

1920s British racing flying boat

Sea Lion III
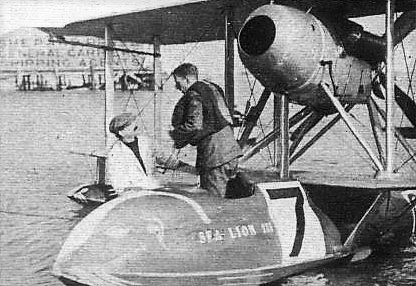
- Henry Biard aboard the Sea Lion III in October 1923

General information
- Type: Racing flying-boat
- National origin: UK
- Manufacturer: Supermarine Aviation Works
- Designer: R.J. Mitchell
- Number built: 1

History
- First flight: 1923
- Retired: 1923

The Supermarine Sea Lion III was a British racing flying boat built by the Supermarine Aviation Works. Designed by Reginald Mitchell, it was a modification of Supermarine's Supermarine Sea Lion II. It was powered by a 550 hp (410 kW) Napier Lion engine.

Sea Lion III was entered for the 1923 Schneider Trophy contest at Cowes. Supermarine's test pilot Henry Biard flew the aircraft and managed third place, reaching a speed of 151.16 mph (243.27 km/h). The performance of the Sea Lion III led to Supermarine designing seaplanes instead of flying boats as racers.

== Development ==
The British aircraft company Supermarine Aviation Works competed in the 1922 Schneider Trophy race for seaplanes and flying boats with a self-funded entry, in contrast to the Italian and French entries, which were sponsored by their respective governments. The entry was a modification of their Sea King II fighter, a single-seat biplane amphibian powered by a 300 hp (220 kW) Hispano Suiza engine in pusher configuration that had first flown in 1921. The aircraft was designed at the company's works at Woolston, Southampton by Supermarine's chief designer and chief engineer, Reginald Mitchell, who incorporated a 450 hp (340 kW) Napier Lion engine loaned by Napier.

== 1923 Schneider Trophy race ==
The course of the 1923 Schneider Trophy race

The Sea Lion II was flown by Henry Biard, who won the race at an average speed of 145.7 mph (234.5 km/h), The victory was the first post-World War I success by a British aircraft in an international competition

For the 1923 Schneider Race, which was held at Cowes on the Isle of Wight, the Sea Lion II was re-engined with a 550 hp (410 kW) Napier Lion and renamed as the Sea Lion III. Mitchell modified the hull so as to reduce drag forces, and he gave the aircraft two bay wings and a larger rudder area. He expected the Sea Lion III to attain speeds in excess of 160 miles per hour (260 km/h); the aircraft managed third place behind the American Curtiss CR-3 seaplanes, reaching a speed of 151.16 mph (243.27 km/h). Supermarine's managing director Hubert Scott-Paine said after the trophy was won by the Americans:

Our drawing office people got all the speed they possibly could out of the machine. We did the best we could and have no regrets. Sea Lion III was 11 mph faster than Sea Lion II, and the credit for this fine performance was due to several people, one of whom is Mr. R.J. Mitchell, who designed both machines.

The British defeat caused Supermarine to abandon using outclassed flying boats as racers, in favour of seaplanes. The Sea Lion III was transferred to the Royal Air Force in 1923.

== Operators ==
United Kingdom

- Royal Air Force
- Supermarine Aviation Works

== Specifications (Sea Lion II) ==
Data from Supermarine Aircraft since 1914

General characteristics

- Crew: 1
- Length: 24 ft 9 in (7.54 m)
- Wingspan: 32 ft 0 in (9.75 m)
- Wing area: 384 sq ft (35.7 m^{2})
- Empty weight: 2,115 lb (959 kg)
- Gross weight: 2,850 lb (1,293 kg)
- Powerplant: 1 × Napier Lion II W-12 water-cooled piston engine, 450 hp (340 kW)
- Propellers: 4-bladed fixed-pitch wooden pusher propeller

Performance

- Maximum speed: 160 mph (260 km/h, 140 kn)
- Endurance: 3 hours

== Sources ==
- Andrews, C. F.; Morgan, E. B. (1987). Supermarine Aircraft since 1914. London: Putnam. ISBN 978-0-85177-800-6.
- Baker, David (1994). Flight and Flying: a chronology. New York: Facts on File. ISBN 978-08160-1-854-3.
- Jackson, A. J. (1988). British Civil Aircraft 1919–1972: Volume III. London: Putnam. ISBN 978-0-85177-818-1.
- Mitchell, Gordon (2006). R.J. Mitchell: Schooldays to Spitfire. Stroud: Tempus. ISBN 978-07524-3-727-9.
- Pegram, Ralph (2016). Beyond the Spitfire: The Unseen Designs of R.J. Mitchell. Pegram: The History Press. ISBN 978-0-7509-6515-6.
