= Sea King =

Sea-King (translation of the Old Norse term Sǣkonungr), refers to a Viking, pirate chieftain of the early Middle Ages.

Sea King may also refer to:

== Aviation ==
- Sikorsky CH-124 Sea King, a Canadian version of the SH-3
- Sikorsky SH-3 Sea King, an American naval helicopter
- Westland Sea King, a British licensed version of the SH-3
- Supermarine Sea King, a 1920s British flying-boat fighter aircraft

== Fiction ==
- Sea King (comics), a villainous counterpart of DC Comics' Aquaman, who exists on Earth-Three
- Seaking (Pokémon), an orange and white, fishlike, water-type Pokémon
- Sea King (One Piece), a "One Piece" animal

== Other uses ==
- Poseidon, the god of the sea in Greek mythology
- Sea King, the original name of CSS Shenandoah
- "The Sea King", a song by Hawkwind from their 1985 album The Chronicle of the Black Sword
- Indonesian coelacanth, also known as the king of the sea
