= Supermarine Sheldrake =

1920s British flying boat

Sheldrake
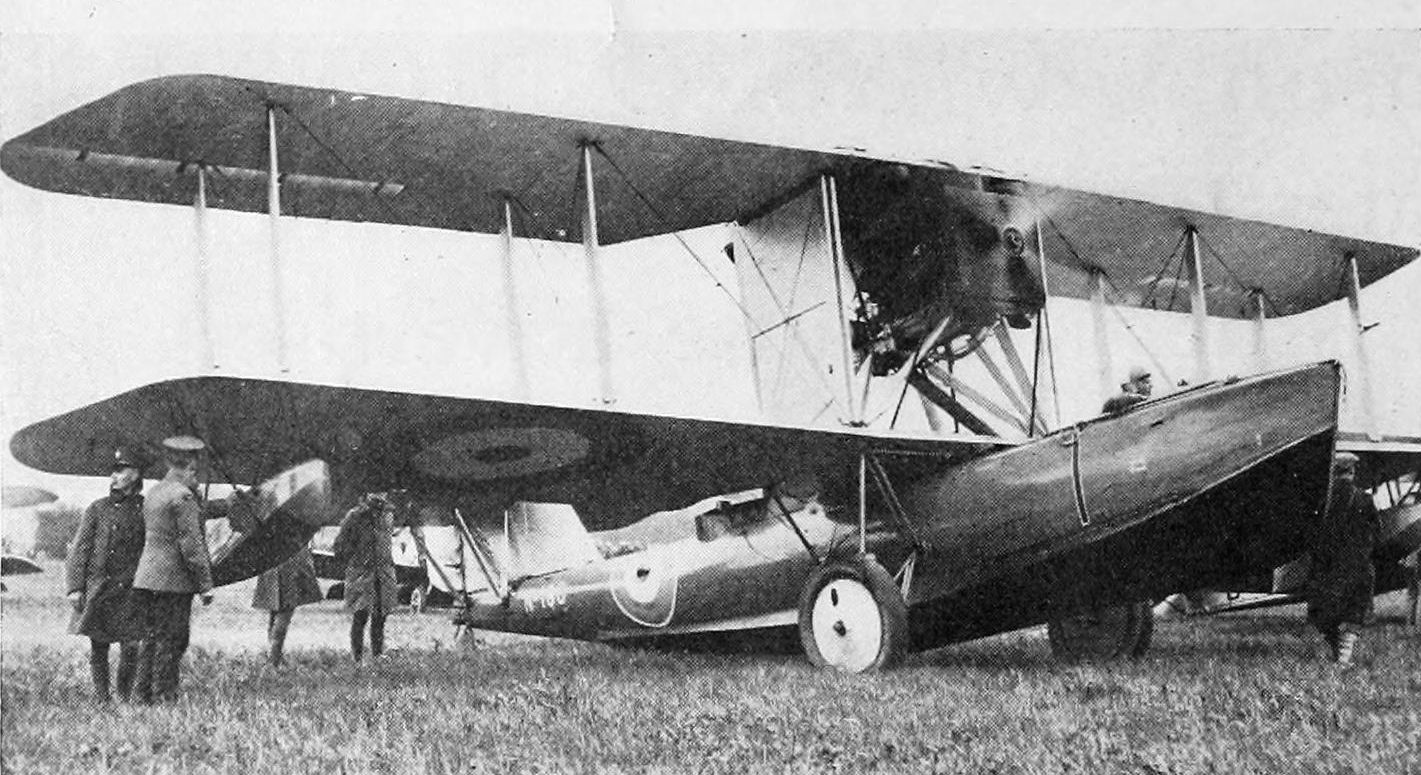

General information
- Type: Amphibian biplane flying boat
- National origin: United Kingdom
- Manufacturer: Supermarine
- Designer: R.J. Mitchell
- Number built: 1

History
- Manufactured: 1923
- First flight: 1927
- Developed from: Supermarine Seagull

The Supermarine Sheldrake was a British amphibian biplane flying boat developed by Supermarine from the Supermarine Seagull with a revised hull based on that of the Supermarine Sea Eagle. It was powered by a Napier Lion engine mounted between the wings driving a four-bladed propeller. Only one Sheldrake, serial number N180, was built.

== Specifications (Sheldrake N180) ==
Data from Supermarine Aircraft Since 1914.

General characteristics

- Crew: 3
- Length: 37 ft 4.5 in (11.392 m)
- Wingspan: 46 ft (14 m)
- Height: 16 ft 2.5 in (4.940 m)
- Wing area: 593 sq ft (55.1 m^{2})
- Empty weight: 4,125 lb (1,871 kg)
- Gross weight: 6,100 lb (2,767 kg)
- Powerplant: 1 × Napier Lion V W-12 water-cooled piston engine, 450 hp (340 kW)
- Propellers: 4-bladed fixed pitch pusher propeller

Performance

- Maximum speed: 103 mph (166 km/h, 90 kn) at sea level
- Landing speed: 55 mph (48 kn; 89 km/h)
- Cruise speed: 85 mph (137 km/h, 74 kn)
- Range: 250 mi (400 km, 220 nmi)

Armament

- Guns: * 1x fixed forward-firing 0.303 in (7.70 mm) Vickers machine-gun
- 1x flexibly mounted 0.303 in (7.70 mm) Lewis machine-gun in the rear cockpit aft of the mainplanes
- Bombs: Up to 1,000 lb (450 kg) of bombs

== See also ==
Related development

- Supermarine Seagull
- Supermarine Scarab

Related lists

- Seaplanes and flying boats
