= Supermarine Sea Lion II =

1920s British racing flying boat

Sea Lion II
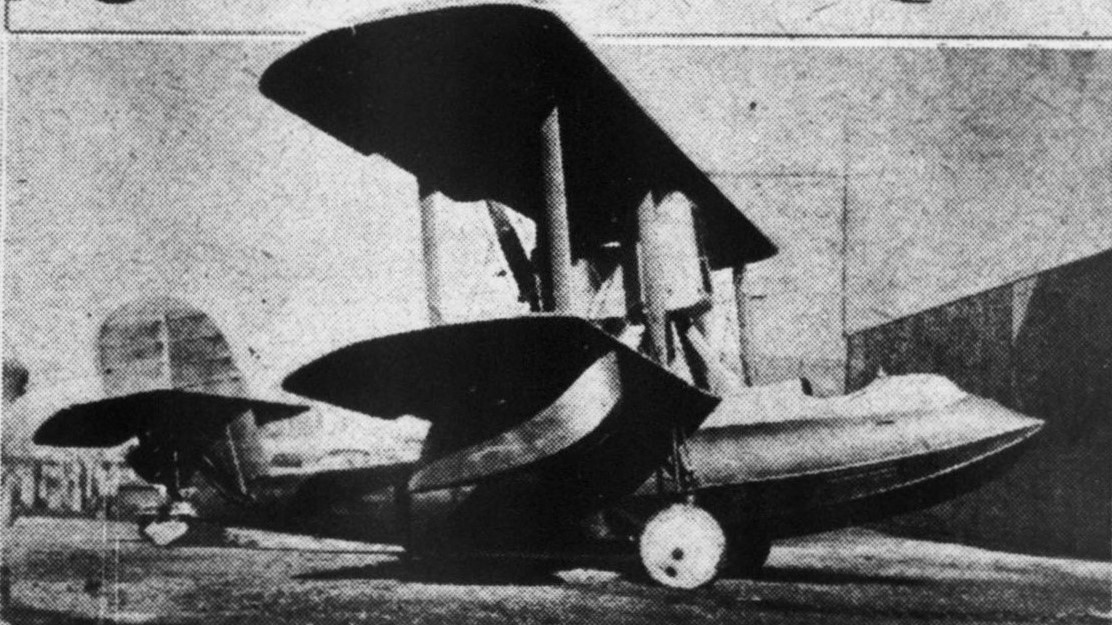

General information
- Type: Racing flying-boat
- National origin: UK
- Manufacturer: Supermarine Aviation Works
- Designer: R.J. Mitchell
- Number built: 1

History
- First flight: 1922
- Variant: Supermarine Sea Lion III

The Supermarine Sea Lion II was a British racing flying boat built by the Supermarine Aviation Works. Designed by Reginald Mitchell, the Sea Lion II was a modification of Supermarine's Sea King II. It was powered by a 450 hp (340 kW) Napier Lion engine.

Entered for the 1922 Schneider Trophy contest at Naples, Sea Lion II was planned to be able to attain a speed of 160 miles per hour (260 km/h). It competed against two Italian aircraft. Supermarine's test pilot Henry Biard flew the aircraft to victory at an average speed of 145.7 mph (234.5 km/h)—the first post-World War I success by a British aeroplane in an international competition.

The Sea Lion II was renamed the Sea Lion III for the 1923 contest, after Mitchell modified the design, and it was re-engined. .

== Development ==
The Schneider Trophy race for seaplanes and flying boats had been won by Italy in 1920 (by a Savoia S.19 flying boat, the only aircraft to take part in the meeting) and again in 1921 by a Macchi M.7, in another uncontested race. A third consecutive Italian victory would result in the trophy being permanently retained by Italy. The British aircraft company Supermarine Aviation Works competed in the 1922 contest with a self-funded entry, in contrast to the Italian and French entries, which were sponsored by their respective governments. The British entry was financed privately by Supermarine's managing director, Hubert Scott-Paine, with the assistance of Napier (who provided the aircraft's engine), Shell (who donated the fuel free of charge), and the Castrol (who gave Supermarine the required lubricants).

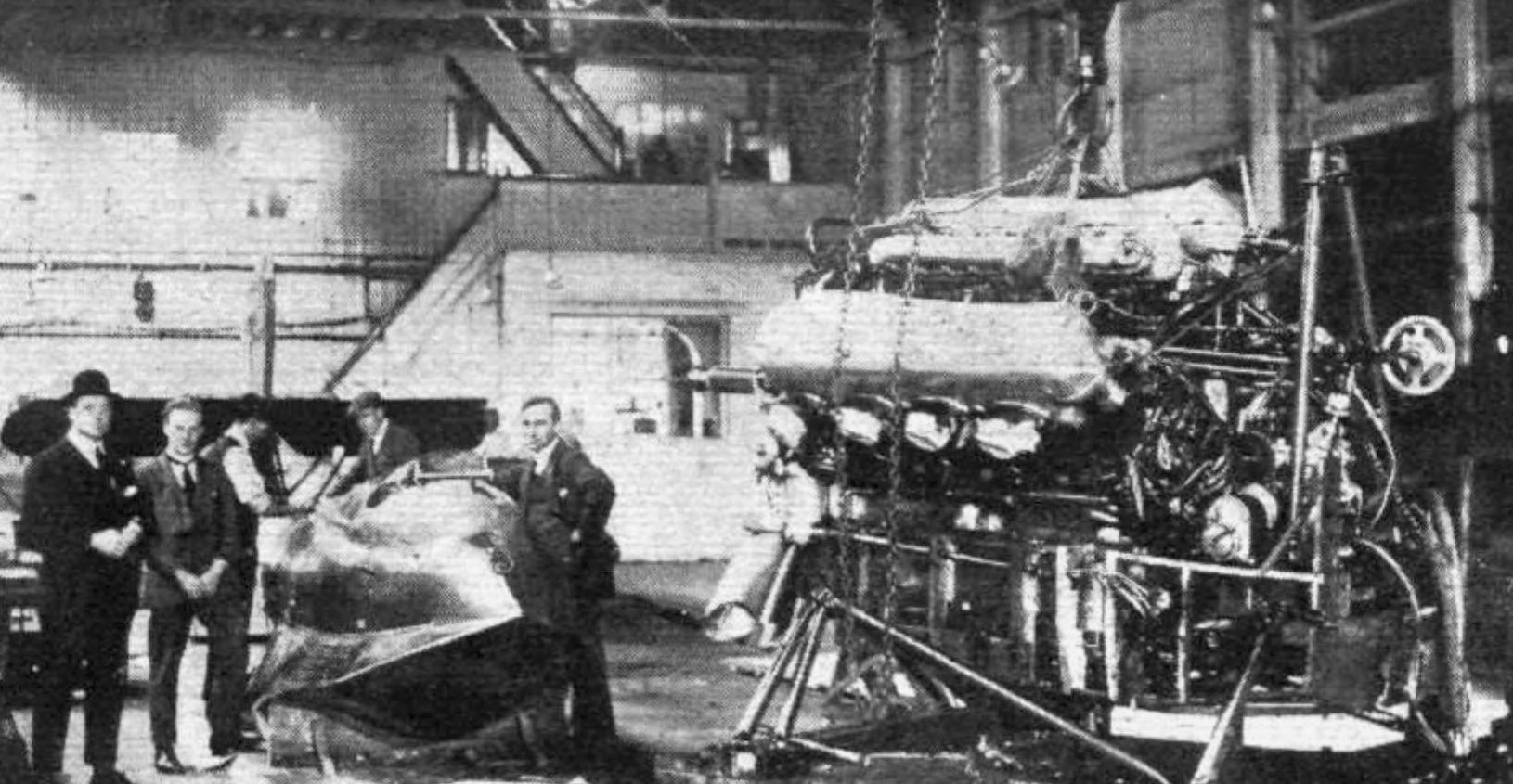
The hull and the Napier Lion engine of the Sea Lion II during its construction

Supermarine developed a racing flying boat as a modification of their Sea King II fighter, a single-seat biplane amphibian powered by a 300 hp (220 kW) Hispano Suiza engine in pusher configuration that had first flown in 1921. The Sea King II was of similar layout to the Supermarine Sea Lion I that had competed in the 1919 Schneider Trophy race, with the Sea Lion I a modified version of the earlier Supermarine Baby, a flying boat fighter aircraft of the First World War. Compared with the Sea Lion I, the new aircraft had a more refined hull shape, a differently-designed tail, and a propeller that had four blades, instead of two.

The Sea King II was modified at the company's works at Woolston, Southampton by Supermarine's chief designer and chief engineer, Reginald Mitchell, who incorporated a 450 hp (340 kW) Napier Lion engine loaned by Napier. The new engine resulted in an increase in power of 50 per cent; Mitchell hoped the new aircraft would be able to reach a speed of 160 miles per hour (260 km/h), which if attained would make it the fastest Britain aircraft to date. His modifications to the rudder and the fin caused the hull to have to be strengthened by adding an extra layer of varnished fabric stretched around the structure. The Sea Lion II was registered as G-EBAH.

== 1922 Schneider Trophy contest ==
The Sea Lion II was entered into the 1922 Schneider Trophy race, which took place at Naples on 12 August 1922 after the Italians brought the initial date for the race forward by two weeks. High winds restricted the time available for the plane to be flight tested in England. The aircraft was dismantled before being put into crates and transported to Naples on board SS Philomel, free of charge. The Sea Lion II competed against two Italian aircraft, a Macchi S.7 and a Savioa S.19, with two French entrants failing to start the race. The course consisted of 13 laps, each of length 17.7 miles (28.5 km); during practice runs, none of the teams showed their true capabilities. The race, which took place on an unusually hot day, was uneventful. Sea Lion II was flown by Henry Biard, who won the race at an average speed of 145.7 mph (234.5 km/h), and took over one and a half minutes less time to complete the course than the second-placed aircraft, flown by Alessandro Passaleva. The victory was the first post-World War I success by a British aircraft in an international competition—it generated publicity for Supermarine, and demonstrated Mitchell's "magic touch" when modifying the airframe to improve the performance of an aircraft that originated from an old design.

For the 1923 Schneider Race, which was held at Cowes on the Isle of Wight, the Sea Lion II was redesigned and re-engined with a 550 hp (410 kW) Napier Lion engine. It was renamed as the Supermarine Sea Lion III.

== Operators ==
United Kingdom

- Royal Air Force
- Supermarine Aviation Works

== Specifications ==
Data from Supermarine Aircraft since 1914

General characteristics

- Crew: 1
- Length: 24 ft 9 in (7.54 m)
- Wingspan: 32 ft 0 in (9.75 m)
- Wing area: 384 sq ft (35.7 m^{2})
- Empty weight: 2,115 lb (959 kg)
- Gross weight: 2,850 lb (1,293 kg)
- Powerplant: 1 × Napier Lion II W-12 water-cooled piston engine, 450 hp (340 kW)
- Propellers: 4-bladed fixed-pitch wooden pusher propeller

Performance

- Maximum speed: 160 mph (260 km/h, 140 kn)
- Endurance: 3 hours

== See also ==
Related lists

- List of flying boats and floatplanes

== Sources ==
- Andrews, C. F.; Morgan, E. B. (1987). Supermarine Aircraft since 1914. London: Putnam. ISBN 978-0-85177-800-6.
- Baker, David (1994). Flight and Flying: a chronology. New York: Facts on File. ISBN 978-08160-1-854-3.
- "The British Victory at Naples: Supermarine Wins the Schneider Cup Race". Flight. Vol. 14, no. 712. 17 August 1922. pp. 465–644.
- Jackson, A. J. (1988). British Civil Aircraft 1919–1972: Volume III. London: Putnam. ISBN 978-0-85177-818-1.
- James, Derek N. (1981). Schneider Trophy Aircraft 1913–1931. London: Putnam. ISBN 978-0-370-30328-4.
- Lewis, Peter (1970). British Racing and Record-Breaking Aircraft. London: Putnam. ISBN 978-0-370-00067-1.
- Mitchell, Gordon (2006). R.J. Mitchell: Schooldays to Spitfire. Stroud: Tempus. ISBN 978-07524-3-727-9.
- Pegram, Ralph (2016). Beyond the Spitfire: The Unseen Designs of R.J. Mitchell. Pegram: The History Press. ISBN 978-0-7509-6515-6.
