= Mitchell Arts Centre =

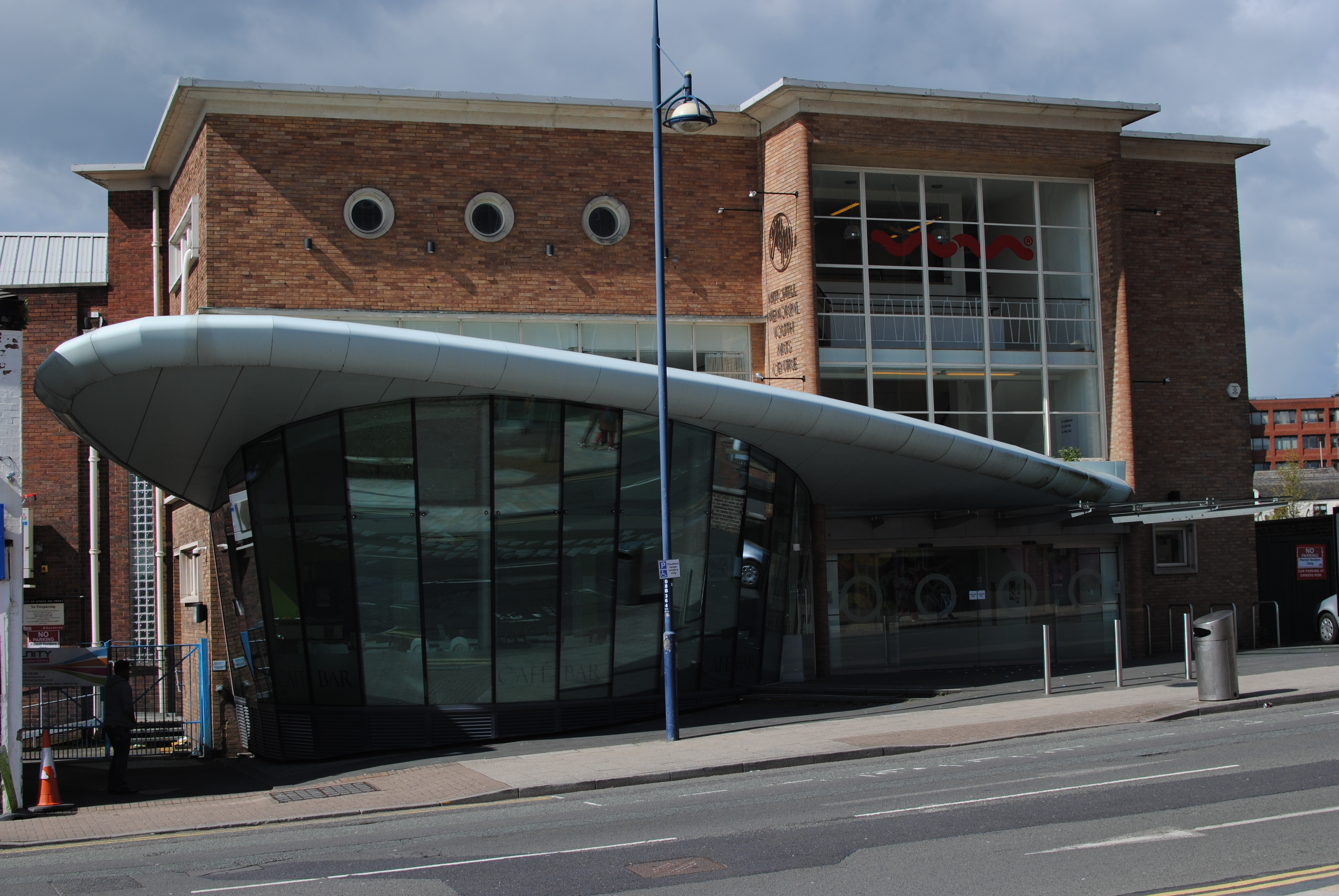
- The building in April 2016, with the canopy added during refurbishment.
- Interactive map of the Mitchell Arts Centre area
- Former names: Mitchell Memorial Youth Arts Centre
- Alternative names: The Mitch
- Etymology: Reginald Mitchell

General information
- Type: Arts Centre
- Architectural style: Modern
- Location: Broad Street, Hanley, Stoke-on-Trent, England
- Coordinates: 53.023025°N 2.1796774°W
- Opened: 28 October 1957
- Renovated: 2009–2011

Website
- mitchellartscentre.co.uk

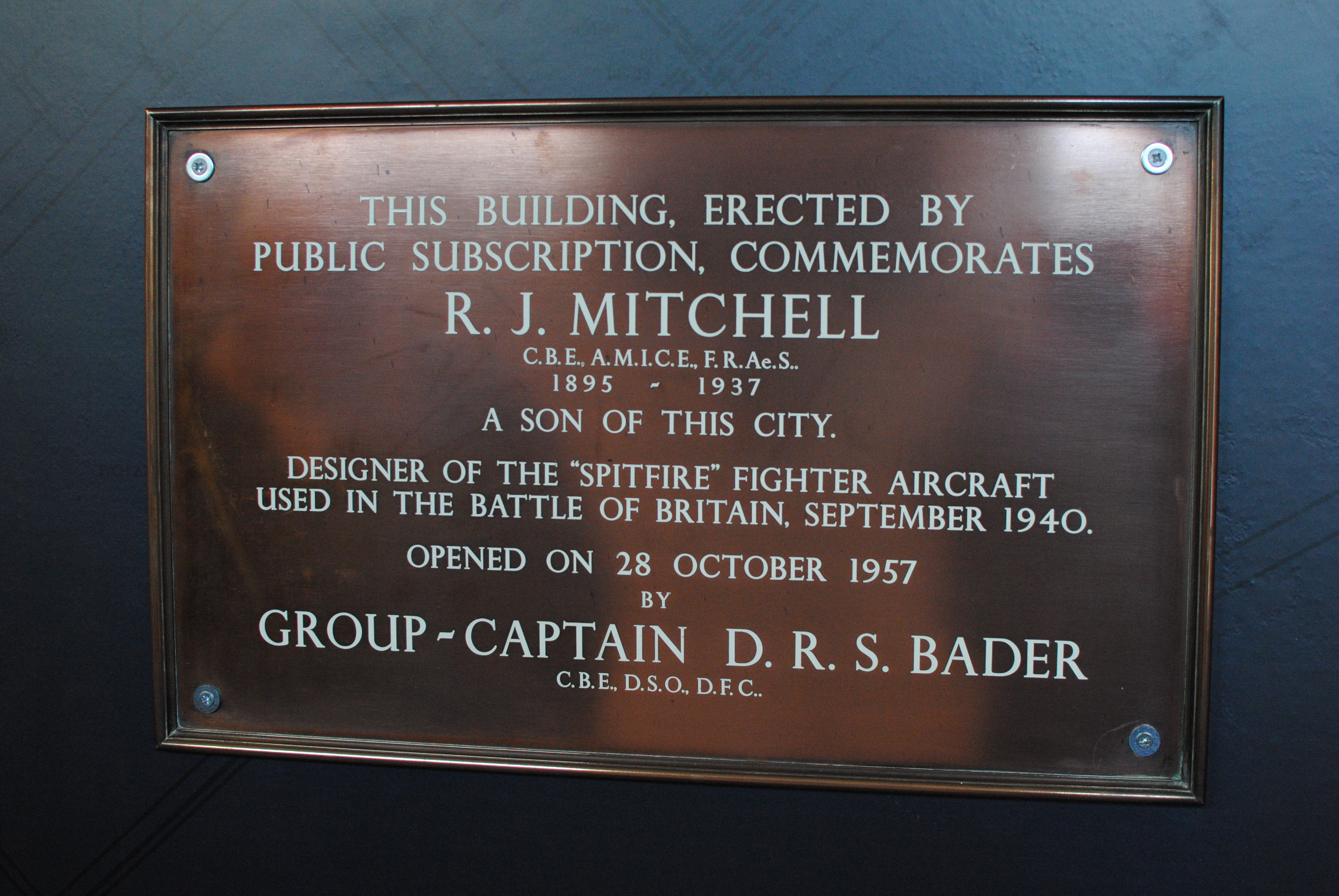
Plaque marking the centre's opening by Douglas Bader.

Mitchell Arts Centre is in Stoke-on-Trent, England. Formerly known as the Mitchell Memorial Youth Theatre and Mitchell Memorial Youth Arts Centre and referred to locally as The Mitch. It was opened by Group-Captain Douglas Bader on 28 October 1957, 14 years after Lord Mayor Councillor Charles Austin Brook launched a public appeal in February 1943 with the support of Florence Mitchell, Reginald Mitchell's widow.

== History ==
Charles Austin Brook was the lord mayor of Stoke-on-Trent between 1942 and 1943. He had, along with the whole of the country witnessed the Battle of Britain, the fight that took place in the skies against the German Luftwaffe in the summer of 1940. It was here that the Spitfire came into its own and on 12 October 1940 Hitler halted his invasion of Britain

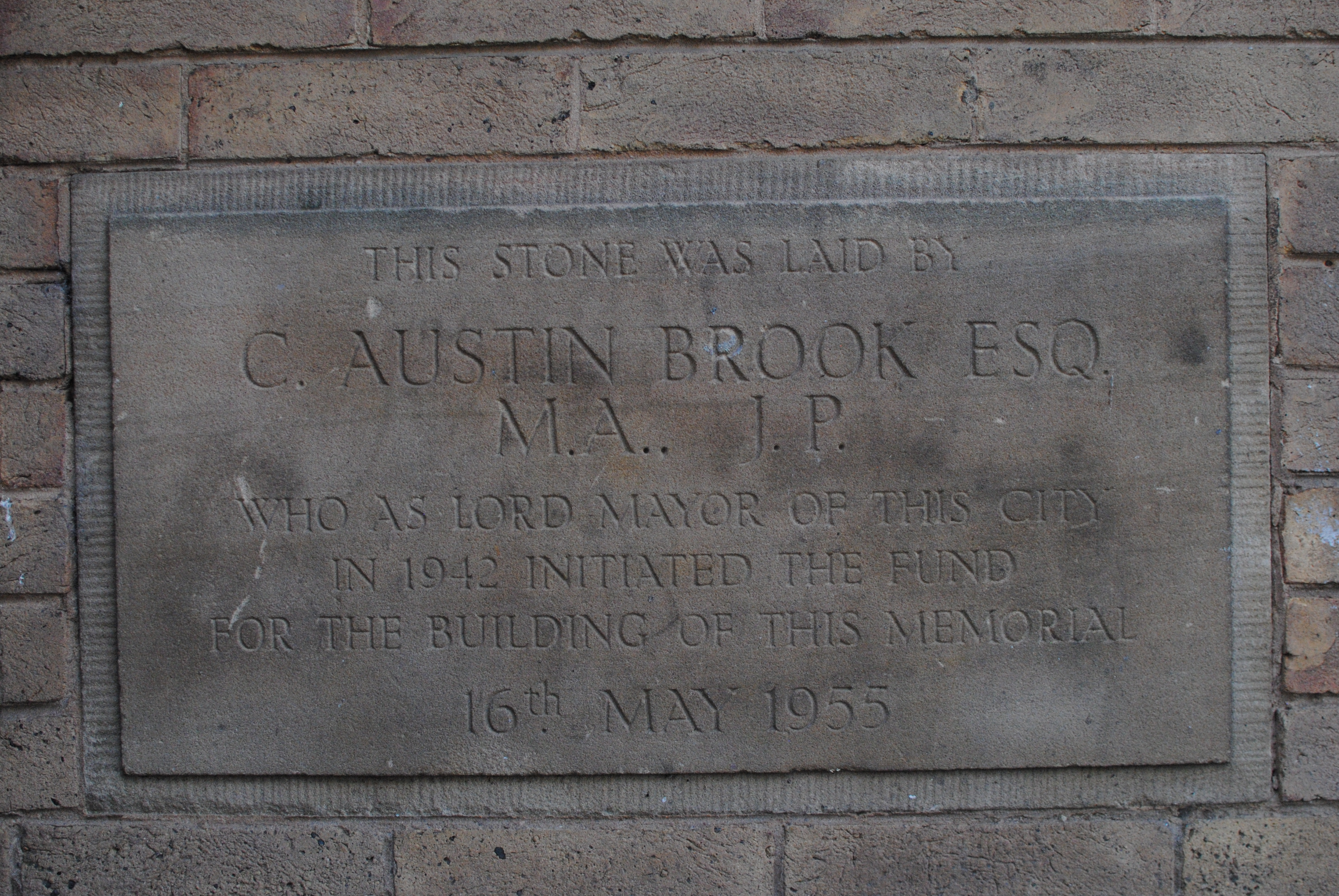
Foundation stone.

It was while Brook was mayor of Stoke-on-Trent he suggested that the city should construct a building that would be a lasting memorial to Reginald Mitchell, the Stoke-on-Trent born designer of the Spitfire. The suggestion was greeted with great enthusiasm. Many suggestions were made, the most impressive from Mr J.F. Carr, the director of education, being to build a Youth Centre. Charles Austin Brook said of the appeal:

Britain and the world owe Reginald Mitchell a debt that cannot be repaid. We can, however, honour his memory by erecting a temple a temple wherein youth may gaze with confidence towards the future; where physical fitness goes hand in hand with learning and reaches the goal of true citizenship.

Initially the vision for the Youth Arts Centre was huge, the City wanted to raise £100,000 and building work was to commence immediately after the war. The plan was for the Youth Centre to have a games room, gym with full-sized boxing ring, photographic studios, and theatre as well as art and music rooms.

The Spitfire Mitchell Memorial Fund was launched nationwide in June 1944 in London. The fund had already raised £40,000 locally. In 1957 the Evening Sentinel Supplement stated that the fund's Executive Committee wanted to raise £250,000, £100,000 of this would be to build the Youth Centre and the rest of the money would be to enable the University of Southampton to endow scholarships to students studying at the School of Engineering. Despite the nationwide appeal, by 1953 the fund had reached £67,431. This was however viewed as a commendable amount considering the hardships of war time and the post-war years. £20,000 was put into the RJ Mitchell Endowment fund for the University of Southampton, this funding ceased but in 2006 scholarships in Mitchell's name have been funded from tuition fees.

== Cartwright House ==
Adjoining the main theatre building is Cartwright House, which was for many years the home to the Hanley branch of the Workers Educational Association providing access to education for adults across the city.

== Refurbishment ==
In April 2009 the Mitchell Memorial Youth Arts Centre closed to undergo a major £4.3 million refurbishment of the theatre facilities. The building re-opened in 2011.
