= Supermarine Sea Eagle =

1920s British flying boat

Sea Eagle
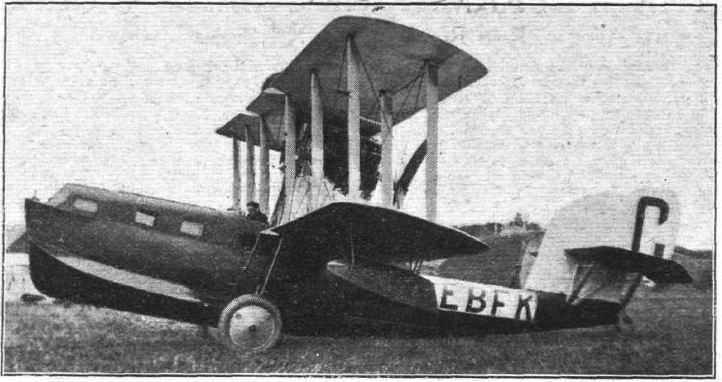
- Sea Eagle G-EBFK

General information
- Type: Biplane, airliner flying boat
- Manufacturer: Supermarine
- Designer: R. J. Mitchell
- Primary user: British Marine Air Navigation Co Ltd
- Number built: 3

History
- Manufactured: 1923
- Introduction date: 25 September 1923
- First flight: June 1923
- Retired: 1928

The Supermarine Sea Eagle was a British, passenger–carrying, amphibious flying boat. It was designed and built by the Supermarine Aviation Works for its subsidiary, the British Marine Air Navigation Co Ltd, to be used on their cross-channel route between Southampton, the Channel Islands and France.

== Service ==
Three civilian aircraft were constructed, G-EBFK, G-EBGR and G-EBGS and the regular service between Southampton and Guernsey began on 25 September 1923 (the planned service to France was never implemented). This was Britain's first scheduled passenger air service by flying boat. However, G-EBFK crashed on 21 May 1924; in January 1927, G-EBGS was lost when it was rammed by a ship in the harbor of St Peter Port, Guernsey. The third aircraft continued on the route until 1928 when it was replaced by a Short S.8 Calcutta.

The wooden hull of the surviving Sea Eagle, G-EBGR, was retained by Vickers until 1949, when they presented it to the British Overseas Airways Corporation; BOAC burnt it in 1954 because of a lack of storage space.

== Variants ==
The Supermarine Sheldrake used the hull of the Sea Eagle and the wings of the Seagull with a tractor engine installation. A single example was built.

The Supermarine Scarab was a military flying-boat, based on the Sea Eagle and Sheldrake but with a pusher engine, specially designed for the Spanish Navy. Twelve were eventually built and delivery to the Spanish Naval Air Service for use in the bomber/reconnaissance role during the Rif War. It was fitted with a .303 in (7.7 mm) Lewis gun and a bomb load of 1,000 lb 454 kg.

== Operators ==
Spain

- Spanish Navy
  - Spanish seaplane carrier Dédalo

United Kingdom

- British Marine Air Navigation Co Ltd
- Imperial Airways

== Specifications ==
Data from Supermarine Aircraft since 1914.

General characteristics

- Crew: 2 (pilot and mechanic)
- Capacity: 6 passengers
- Length: 37 ft 4 in (11.38 m)
- Wingspan: 46 ft (14 m)
- Width: 21 ft 1 in (6.43 m) folded
- Height: 15 ft 11 in (4.85 m)
- Wing area: 620 sq ft (58 m^{2})
- Empty weight: 3,950 lb (1,792 kg)
- Gross weight: 6,050 lb (2,744 kg)
- Max takeoff weight: 6,500 lb (2,948 kg) (overload)
- Powerplant: 1 × Rolls-Royce Eagle IX V-12 Water-cooled piston engine, 360 hp (270 kW)
- Propellers: 4-bladed fixed-pitch wooden pusher propeller

Performance

- Maximum speed: 93 mph (150 km/h, 81 kn)
- Range: 230 mi (370 km, 200 nmi)
- Time to altitude: 5,000 ft (1,524 m) in 19 minutes

== See also ==
- List of flying boats and floatplanes
