= Supermarine Baby =

British WWI fighter aircraft

Baby
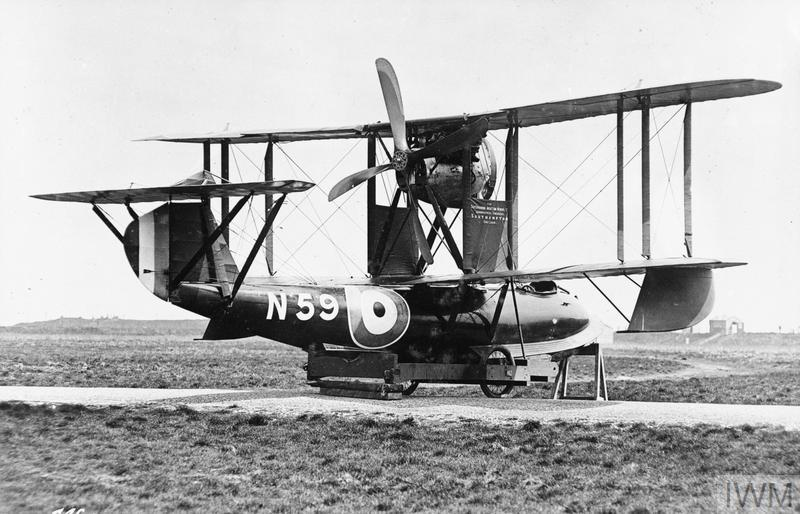
- N59, Isle of Grain Test Depot.

General information
- Type: Flying boat fighter
- Manufacturer: Supermarine
- Designer: William Hargreaves
- Status: Prototype
- Number built: 2

History
- Introduction date: February 1918
- Developed from: AD Flying Boat
- Developed into: Supermarine Sea King; Supermarine Sea Lion I Supermarine Walrus

The Supermarine Baby (also called the Supermarine N.1B Baby) was a First World War fighter aircraft that was the earliest example of a single-seat flying boat fighter to be built in the United Kingdom. It was designed by Supermarine to meet a 1917 Navy Board specification which stipulated the aircraft have a speed of 95 knots (176 km/h; 109 mph) and a ceiling of 20,000 feet (6,100 m), and be capable of being launched from ships at sea. When it first flew in February 1918 it was one of the smallest and fastest flying boats then in existence.

Supermarine's chief designer William Hargreaves based his design on the AD Flying Boat. The Baby was given folding wings, a streamlined hull and a 150 horsepower (110 kW) Hispano-Suiza engine. A single aircraft was built by the company which performed well during trials, and the aircraft was fitted with a more powerful engine in August 1918. A production contract was not awarded, as the Admiralty decided to operate the Sopwith Pup and Sopwith Camel fighters from aboard ships. One of the designs for the Baby formed the basis for other aircraft, including the Supermarine Sea Lion I which participated in the 1919 Schneider Trophy race. Supermarine's future chief designer Reginald Mitchell was probably involved in the Sea Lion's design and preparation for the contest.

== Commission ==
The Baby was designed and built under the direction of the owner of Supermarine, Hubert Scott-Paine, who had joined Pemberton-Billing Limited in 1911. Scott-Paine bought out its original owner, Noel Pemberton Billing, in June 1916, after which the company was renamed Supermarine Aviation Works Limited. During the First World War, the company continued to specialise in producing and maintaining marine aircraft, as testified by its location at Woolston on the banks of the River Itchen, its lack of an aerodrome and its maintenance of a workforce skilled in constructing boats. Scott-Paine forged good links with the Air Department (AD), which took over jurisdiction of the company during the war.

The Baby was notable for being the first single-seat flying boat fighter aircraft to be designed and built in the United Kingdom. It was designed to meet Navy Board specification N.1B. (Note: Three companies planned fighters designed to meet the N.1B specification: Supermarine, Blackburn and Westland.) The specification was for a single seat floatplane or flying boat fighter to counter the German Brandenburg aircraft patrolling the North Sea. It had to be capable of operating from the Royal Navy's seaplane carriers and reach a speed of 95 knots (176 km/h; 109 mph) at 10,000 feet (3,000 m), and a ceiling of 20,000 feet (6,100 m). The Baby was produced under Air Department contract A.S. 3929.

Supermarine received an order for three aircraft. On awarding the contract, the AD established its presence at Supermarine by sending one of its lead designers, Harold Bolas, and his deputies to oversee the production of the Baby.

== Design and development ==
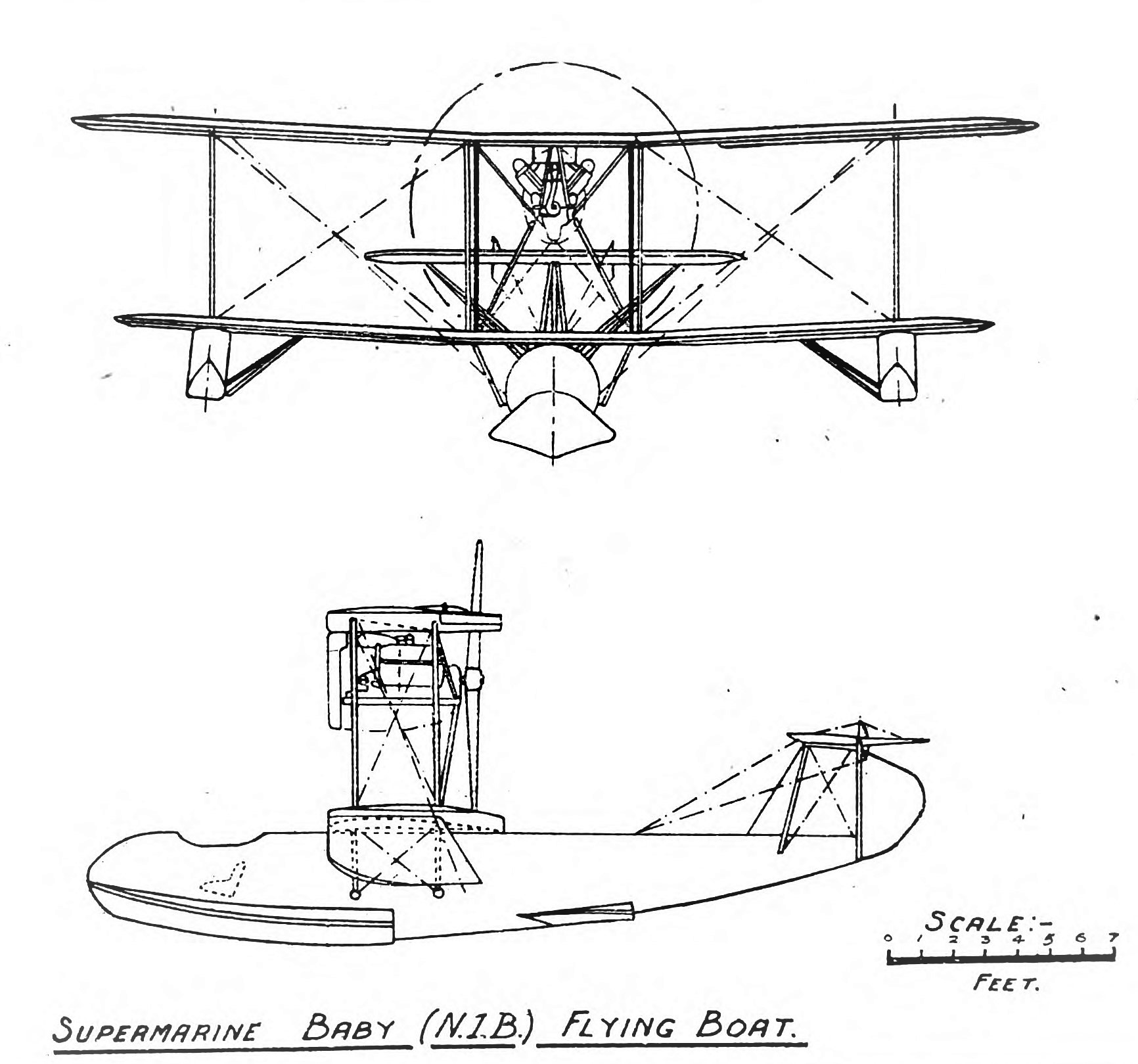
The Supermarine Baby (general arrangement drawings from a 1920 issue of Aerial Age Weekly)

The Baby was designed by Supermarine's chief designer William Hargreaves, who had joined the company in 1916. (Note: Hargreaves is given the initials F.J. in at least two sources.) Hargreaves based his design on the AD Flying Boat, a two-seater sea patrol and reconnaissance biplane with a poor performance record that had a flexible, tubular body and wings separated by four vertical struts that folded forwards.

Hargreaves produced a design for a pusher biplane with a small single engine, folding single-bay wings and a T-tail. The streamlined wooden hull for the Baby, which was based on the design used in the AD Flying Boat produced by the British designer Linton Hope, had the pilot's cockpit located in the nose. The engine and propeller were positioned so as to minimise the effect of spray during take-off. It was initially designed with a 150 horsepower (110 kW) Hispano-Suiza engine that drove a propeller with four blades.

The Baby reached a speed of 102 knots (189 km/h; 117 mph) at sea level and 97 knots (180 km/h; 112 mph) at 10,000 feet (3,000 m). It landed with a maximum speed that varied from 87 to 178 kilometres per hour (54 to 111 mph). It had a maximum wing load equal to 36.5 kg/m^{2} (7.48 lb/ft^{2}).

== Operational history ==
The prototype was given the serial number N59 and first flew after its completion in February 1918. During trials, it handled well and proved to be fast and manoeuvrable, but showed a tendency to ship water into the cockpit when it accelerated. Hargreaves responded to this problem by producing at least six alternative designs for the hull. According to a 1920 issue of Flight magazine, the aircraft looped twice that February. (Note: Looping was next to be accomplished by a Supermarine flying boat in 1933, when the feat was repeated by a Seagull V.)

In August 1918, the aircraft was fitted with a more powerful Sunbeam Arab 200 horsepower (150 kW) engine. The smallest and fastest flying boat then in existence, its evaluation was completed just prior to the Armistice of 11 November 1918. The performance of the Baby was good enough for a production contract to be awarded, which was close to completion that November.

The Baby never saw action during the war. By November 1918, the Royal Naval Air Service had already been using Sopwith Pup landplanes to fly off platforms aboard ships, and the success of the Pup (and later the Sopwith Camel) was a factor—along with the end of the war—that caused the British government to cancel the N.1B programme. By this time, a second aircraft (named N60) had been built, which never flew. N60 was delivered as spare parts to support testing of N59. A third machine (N61) had yet to be assembled—although the construction of the hull had begun—at the time the programme was abandoned.

== Legacy ==
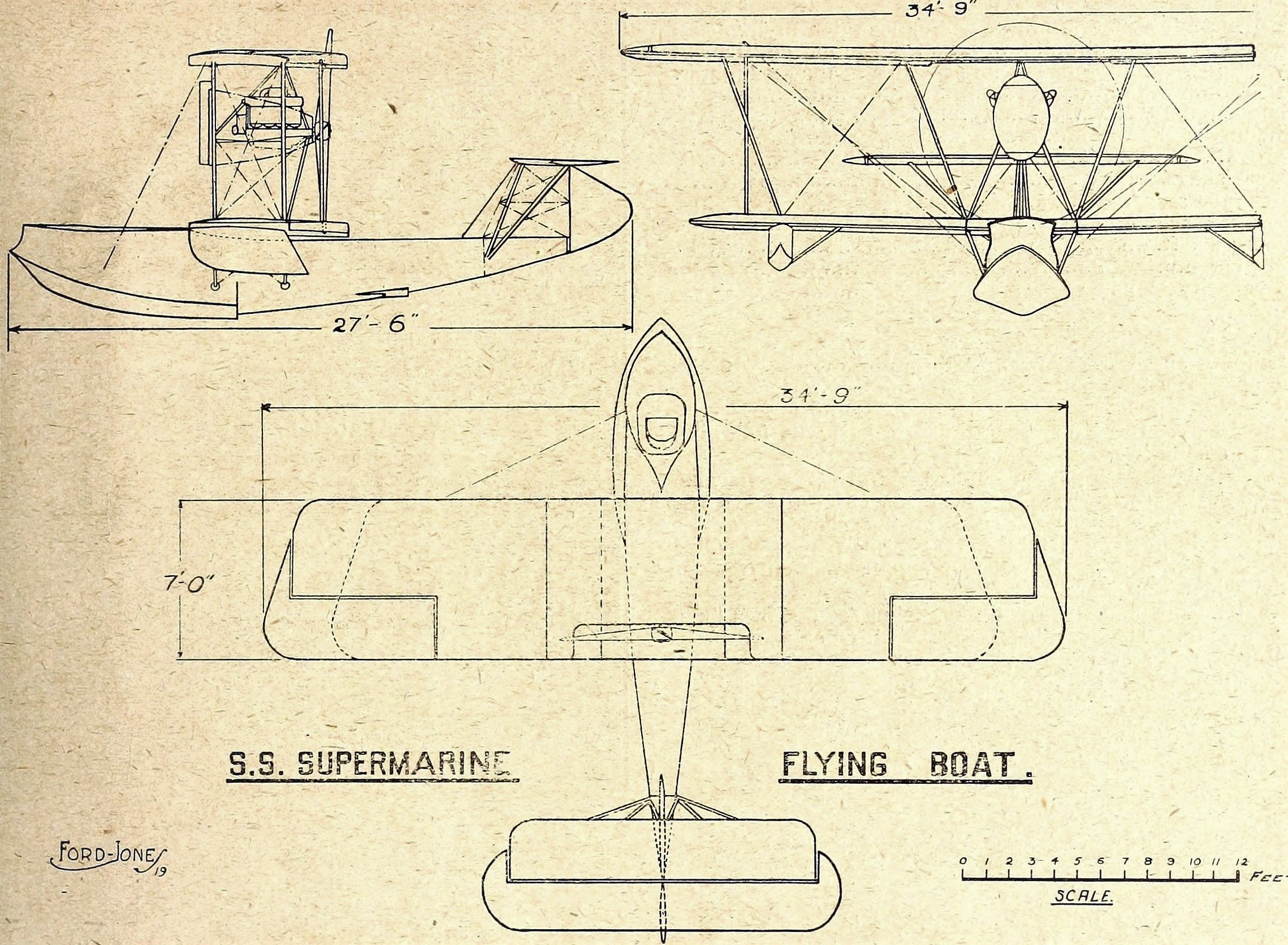
General arrangement drawings for the 'A' Single Seater Flying Boat (The Aeroplane, October 1919)

The Baby was probably Supermarine's most successful design produced during the First World War. The design for N61, which featured one of Hargreaves' revised hull designs, formed the basis for Supermarine's 'A' Single Seater Flying Boat, later named the Sea Lion I when it participated in the 1919 Schneider Trophy. The Baby was also used as the basis for the Supermarine Sea King and the Supermarine Walrus (1933), which later became the standard "spotter" aircraft used to direct gunfire from the Royal Navy's catapult-equipped warships.

The Baby was used to develop the flying boats of the Schneider Trophy. The Sea King evolved to become the Supermarine Sea Lion II, which became the first post-First World War British aircraft to win an international competition when it won the contest in 1922.

It is likely that Reginald Mitchell, who joined Supermarine in 1916, would have been involved in the design changes and preparation of the Sea Lion.

== Specifications (N.1B Baby) ==
Data from Supermarine Aircraft since 1914.

General characteristics

- Crew: 1
- Length: 26 ft 4 in (8.03 m)
- Wingspan: 30 ft 6 in (9.30 m)
- Height: 10 ft 7 in (3.23 m)
- Wing area: 309 sq ft (28.7 m^{2})
- Empty weight: 1,699 lb (771 kg)
- Gross weight: 2,326 lb (1,055 kg)
- Powerplant: 1 × Hispano-Suiza 8B V-8 water-cooled piston engine, 150 hp (110 kW)
- Propellers: 4-bladed wooden fixed-pitch pusher propeller
  (the aircraft was subsequently powered with a 200 horsepower (150 kW) engine)

Performance

- Maximum speed: 116 mph (187 km/h, 101 kn)
- Alighting speed: 57 mph (50 kn; 92 km/h)
- Endurance: 3 hours
- Service ceiling: 10,700 ft (3,300 m)
- Time to altitude: 10,000 ft (3,050 m) in 25 minutes 10 seconds

== See also ==
Related development

- Supermarine Sea Lion I
- Supermarine Sea King
- Supermarine Walrus

Aircraft of comparable role, configuration, and era

- Westland N.1B

Related lists

- List of flying boats and floatplanes

== Sources ==
- Allward, Maurice F. (1988). An Illustrated History of Seaplanes and Flying Boats. New York: Noble & Barnes. ISBN 978-08802-9-286-3.
- Andrews, Charles Ferdinand; Morgan, Eric B. (1981). Supermarine Aircraft since 1914. London: Putnam. ISBN 978-03701-0-018-0 – via Google Books.
- Baldit, M. Albert (1923). "Technical Memorandum No. 194: Atmospheric waves and their Utilization in Soaring Flight". Comptes Rendus (2). National Advisory Committee for Aeronautics – via Google Books.
- Bruce, J. M. (1957). British Aeroplanes 1914–18. London: Putnam. ISBN 978-03700-0-038-1.
- Lewis, Peter M. H. (1979). The British Fighter since 1912: sixty-seven years of design and development. London: Putnam. ISBN 9780370302508. OCLC 164626682.
- London, Peter (2003). British Flying Boats. Stroud, UK: Sutton Publishing. ISBN 978-0-7509-2695-9 – via Google Books.
- Pegram, Ralph (2016). Beyond the Spitfire: The Unseen Designs of R.J. Mitchell. Pegram: The History Press. ISBN 978-0-7509-6515-6.
- Roussel, Mike (2013). Spitfire's Forgotten Designer: the career of Supermarine's Joe Smith. Brimscombe Port: The History Press. ISBN 978-0-7524-8759-5.
