= R. J. Mitchell =

British aircraft designer (1895–1937)

R. J. Mitchell CBE FRAeS
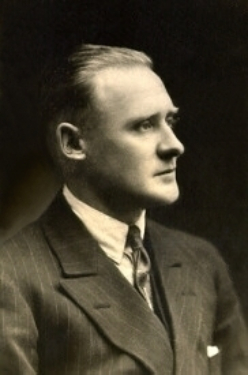
- Born: Reginald Joseph Mitchell; 20 May 1895; Butt Lane, Staffordshire, England
- Died: 11 June 1937 (aged 42); Southampton, Hampshire, England
- Occupation: Aircraft designer
- Years active: 1916–1936
- Employer: Supermarine
- Known for: Designer of the Supermarine S.6B and the Supermarine Spitfire
- Spouse: Florence Dayson (m.1918)
- Children: 1
- Awards: Order of the British Empire (Commander) (CBE)

Signature
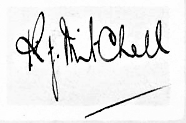

Reginald Joseph Mitchell (20 May 1895 – 11 June 1937) was a British aircraft designer who worked for the Southampton aviation company Supermarine from 1916 until 1936. He is best known for designing racing seaplanes, such as the Supermarine S.6B, and for leading the team that designed the Supermarine Spitfire.

Born in the village of Butt Lane, Staffordshire, Mitchell attended Hanley High School and afterwards worked as an apprentice at a locomotive engineering works, whilst also studying engineering and mathematics at night. In 1916 he moved to Southampton to join Supermarine. He was appointed Chief Engineer in 1920 and Technical Director in 1927. Between 1920 and 1936 he designed 24 aircraft, including flying boats and racing seaplanes, light aircraft, fighters and bombers. From 1925 to 1929 he worked on a series of racing seaplanes, built by Supermarine to compete in the Schneider Trophy competition, the final entry in the series being the Supermarine S.6B. The S.6B won the trophy in 1931. Mitchell was authorised by Supermarine to proceed with a new design, the Type 300, which became the Spitfire.

In 1933, Mitchell underwent surgery to treat rectal cancer. He continued to work and earned his pilot's licence in 1934, but in early 1937, he was forced, by a recurrence of the cancer, to give up work. After his death that year, he was succeeded as chief designer at Supermarine by Joseph Smith.

== Early Life and education ==
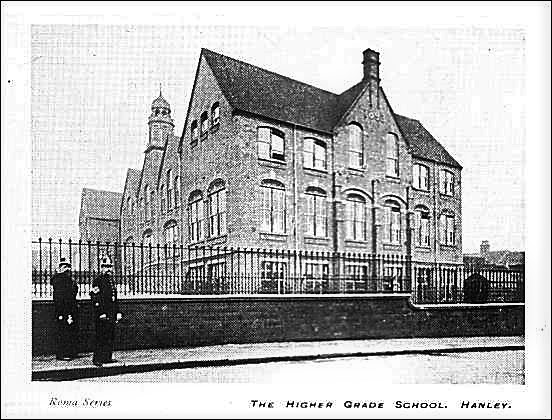
Hanley High School, c.1900

Reginald Joseph Mitchell was born on 20 May 1895 at 115 Congleton Road, in the village of Butt Lane, in Staffordshire, England. He was the second eldest of five children, and the eldest of three brothers. His father Herbert Mitchell was a Yorkshireman who became headmaster of three Staffordshire schools in the Stoke-on-Trent area, before he retired from teaching. He then helped to establish a printing business, Wood, Mitchell and C. Ltd, in Hanley. Herbert Mitchell's wife Eliza Jane Brain was the daughter of a cooper. When Reginald was a child, the family lived in Normacot, now a suburb of Stoke-on-Trent.

Reginald (known to his family as "Reg") attended Queensberry Road Higher Elementary School from the age of eight, before moving on to Hanley High School. There he developed an interest in making and flying model aircraft. In 1911, after leaving school at the age of 16, he worked as an apprentice for Kerr Stuart & Co. of Fenton, a railway engineering works. After completing his apprenticeship he worked in the drawing office at Kerr Stuart, whilst studying engineering and mathematics at a local technical college, where he displayed a talent for mathematics.

After leaving Kerr Stuart in 1916, Mitchell worked for a period as a part-time teacher. He applied to join the armed forces on two occasions, but was on each occasion rejected because of his training as an engineer.

Reginald had a nephew; J. W. Mitchell, an artist who painted several scenes involving his uncle's Spitfires; profits from his sales of his work were donated to the RAF Benevolent Fund.

== Family ==
Mitchell married Florence Dayton in 1918 in Caverswall, Staffordshire, England. They had one son, Kenneth Gordon Brent Mitchell, born in 1920.

== Career at Supermarine ==
=== Early career and promotion ===
In 1916, Mitchell joined the Supermarine Aviation Works at Southampton, possibly for a probationary period. Since its formation in 1912, the company had specialised in building flying boats, producing its first aircraft, the Pemberton-Billing P.B.1, in 1914. During the First World War, Supermarine was taken over by the British Government, and during this period the company produced the first British single-seat flying boat fighter, the Supermarine Baby.

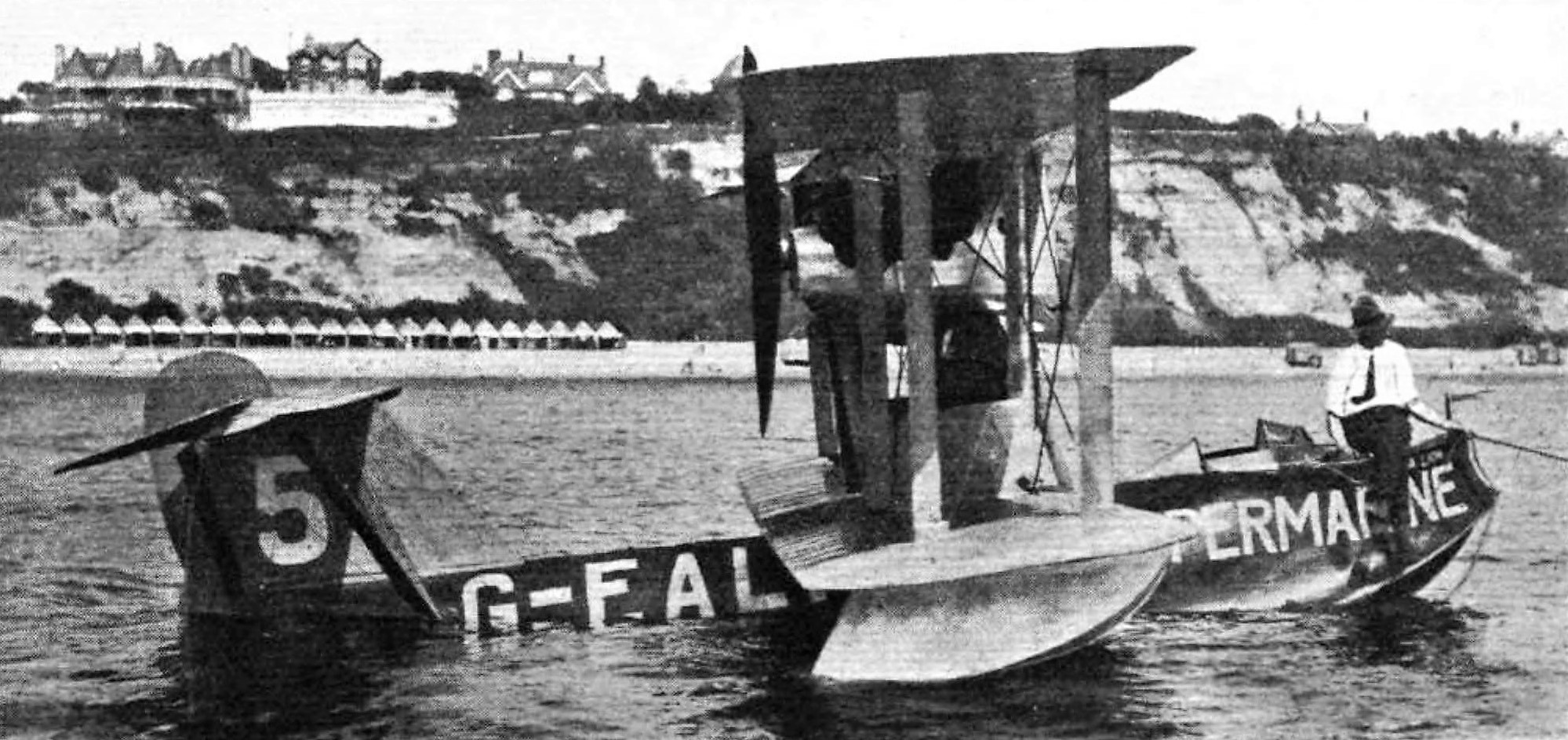
The Supermarine Sea Lion I moored at the start of the 1919 Schneider Trophy race. The 25-year-old Mitchell is likely to have played a role in the development of the aircraft.

On joining the company, Mitchell was given the opportunity to develop skills in a number of roles, so as to gain experience of the aircraft industry. His basic engineering training would have helped him to become established, as he adjusted from working with locomotives to understanding aeroplanes. A competent mathematician, Mitchell's ability to think creatively and use his intuition when looking at a design was soon recognised. The earliest record of his work at Supermarine is as a draughtsman, and dates from 1916. By 1917, he had become assistant to the company's owner and designer, Hubert Scott-Paine. He is likely to have played a role in the development of the Baby when in 1919 it was adapted for racing for the Schneider Trophy, and was renamed the Supermarine Sea Lion.

In 1918, Mitchell was promoted to become the works manager's assistant. When Supermarine's chief designer William Hargreaves left the company in the summer of 1919, he was replaced by Mitchell, who took up his new duties later that year, leading a team that had in 1918 consisted of six draughtsmen and a secretary. Following his promotion, the 19-year-old returned to Staffordshire and married his fiancée Florence Dayson, an infant school headmistress, who was 11 years his senior. (Note: Reginald Mitchell and Florence Dayson were married at the church in Meir, Staffordshire. Their son Gordon was born in November 1920. Florence Mitchell died in Southampton in 1946.) By 1921 he had become Supermarine's chief engineer. Following the departure of Scott-Paine in November 1923, Mitchell was able to negotiate a new contract, which led to greater influence in the company. The 10-year contract was a sign of his indispensability to Supermarine.

It is unclear how it was that Mitchell was so quickly promoted when he was still a young man, as few documents relating to his early career have survived. However, his early promotion was not unusual at that time; other men of Mitchell's age held similar positions in other aircraft companies. Decades after his death, when approached for information about him, those surviving Supermarine colleagues who had known Mitchell were reluctant to divluge their personal memories.

=== 1920s civilian and military aircraft designs ===
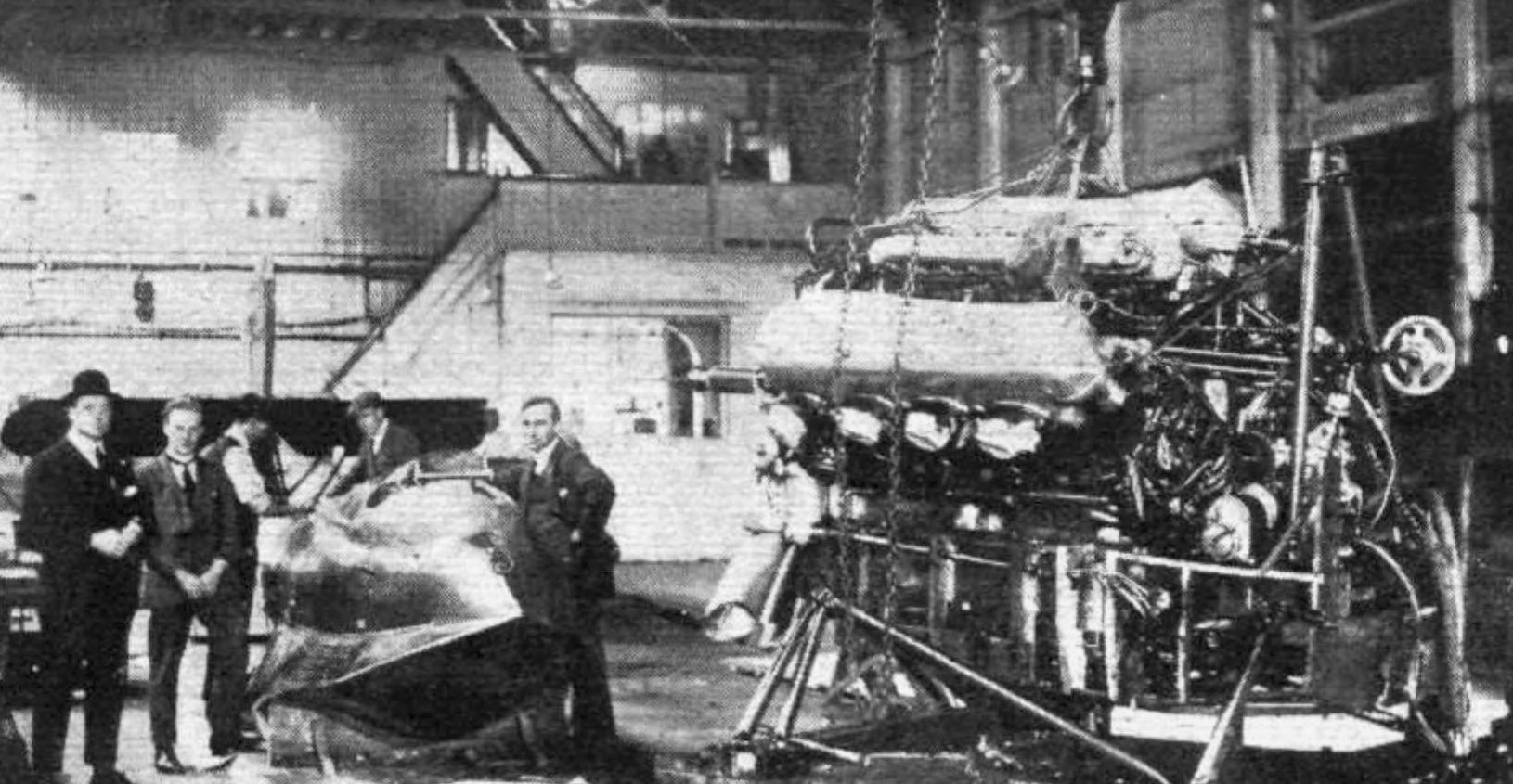
The Supermarine Sea Lion II hull and Napier Lion engine prior to be installed. Mitchell is standing second-to-left.

Between 1920 and 1936, Mitchell designed 24 aeroplanes. His early projects often involved adapting Supermarine's earlier aircraft; in June 1920 the Air Ministry announced a civilian aircraft competition, and Supermarine's entry for the competition was the Commercial Amphibian, an adaptation by Mitchell of the company's Supermarine Channel. The Amphibian finished second, but was judged the best of the three entrants in terms of design and reliability. His redesigned Supermarine Baby, renamed the Supermarine Sea King, was exhibited the Olympia International Aero Exhibition in 1920, the first international exhibition to be held in the UK since the end of World War I. In 1922, the Chilean government bought a Channel, modified by Mitchell. That year he redesigned a version of the Commercial Amphibian, the Supermarine Sea Eagle.

Mitchell produced new designs for aircraft early in his career; he designed the Supermarine Seal II in 1920, and the triplane Flying Boat Torpedo Carrier the following year. The historian Ralph Pegram notes that the unbuilt Torpedo Carrier reveals the "first true indication of Mitchell's thoughts as a designer". In 1921 work began on the Supermarine Swan, a commercial carrier, but only the prototype was built. The Supermarine Seagull II—later used as the basis for future designs—began to receive production orders in 1922. The Amphibian Service Bomber was designed by Mitchell in 1924. Renamed the Supermarine Scarab, 12 aircraft were bought by the Spanish Navy; they remained in service until 1928.

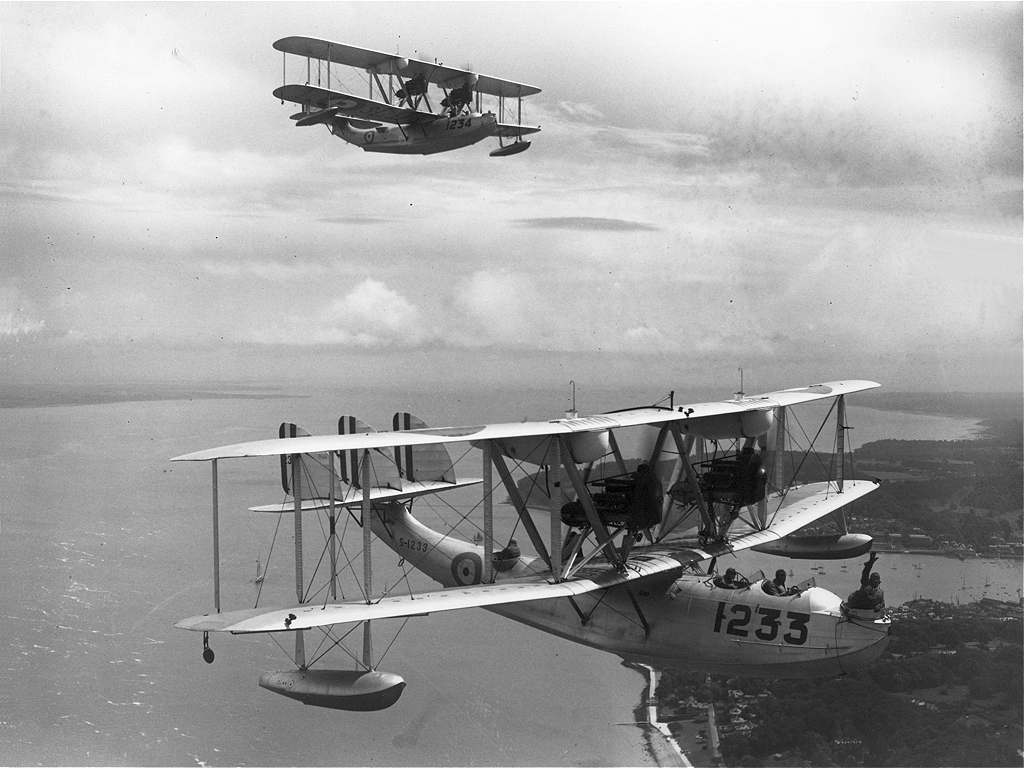
The Supermarine Southampton, one of the most successful flying boats of the between-war period

Supermarine's first design for a land aircraft, the Supermarine Sparrow, competed unsuccessfully during the Air Ministry's Light Air Competition of 1924, and subsequently failed to gain orders. A variant, the Supermarine Sparrow II, was used by Mitchell to test his different airfoil designs.

Work on the Supermarine Southampton started in March 1924. It flew for the first time the following March, and entered service in July 1925. By the end of 1925, Mitchell's team had designed the Southampton II—the Southampton but with a metal hull. The plane, more powerful, lighter, and more durable than its predecessor, flew for the first time in 1927. A paper by Mitchell on the use of the Southampton appeared in the March 1926 edition of Flight magazine. In 1928, a flight of Supermarine Southampton IIs left Felixstowe on 14 October for Australia, and returned to the UK on 11 December. The expedition provided Mitchell's design team with valuable information about operating aircraft in the tropics. The Southampton was one of the most successful flying boats of the between-war period, and established Britain as a leading developer of maritime aircraft. It was used to equip six RAF squadrons up to 1936.

In 1926, the Air Ministry issued specification 21/26 as a way to address the need for new fighter aircraft, and Mitchell's design team, which he had re-organised that year into separate drawing and technical offices, responded with a number of designs, including the Single Seat Fighter. By this time, Supermarine was moving away from wooden amphibious aircraft. The company concentrated instead on designing larger metal flying boats, such as the 3-Engined Biplane Flying Boat, designed in November 1927. The Supermarine Air Yacht, and a new design, the Southampton X (not related to other planes with the same name), was ordered in June 1928. Mitchell dispensed with the complicated curved surfaces for the wings and the hulls of the Air Yacht and the Southampton X, and as a result these aircraft appeared "boxy".

Specification R.6/28, issued in 1928, resulted in a series of designs by Supermarine for a six-engined flying boat, with one of designs being a radical departure for Mitchell—it had a newly designed 140 feet (43 m) cantilever wing with a large surface area and cross section. The aircraft was never built. From 1929 to 1931, he continued to design aircraft based on the Southampton and the Southampton X, such as the Supermarine Sea Hawk and its variant the Sea Hawk II, the Type 179, the Nanok and the Seamew.

=== New designs, production orders and patents (1929–1934) ===
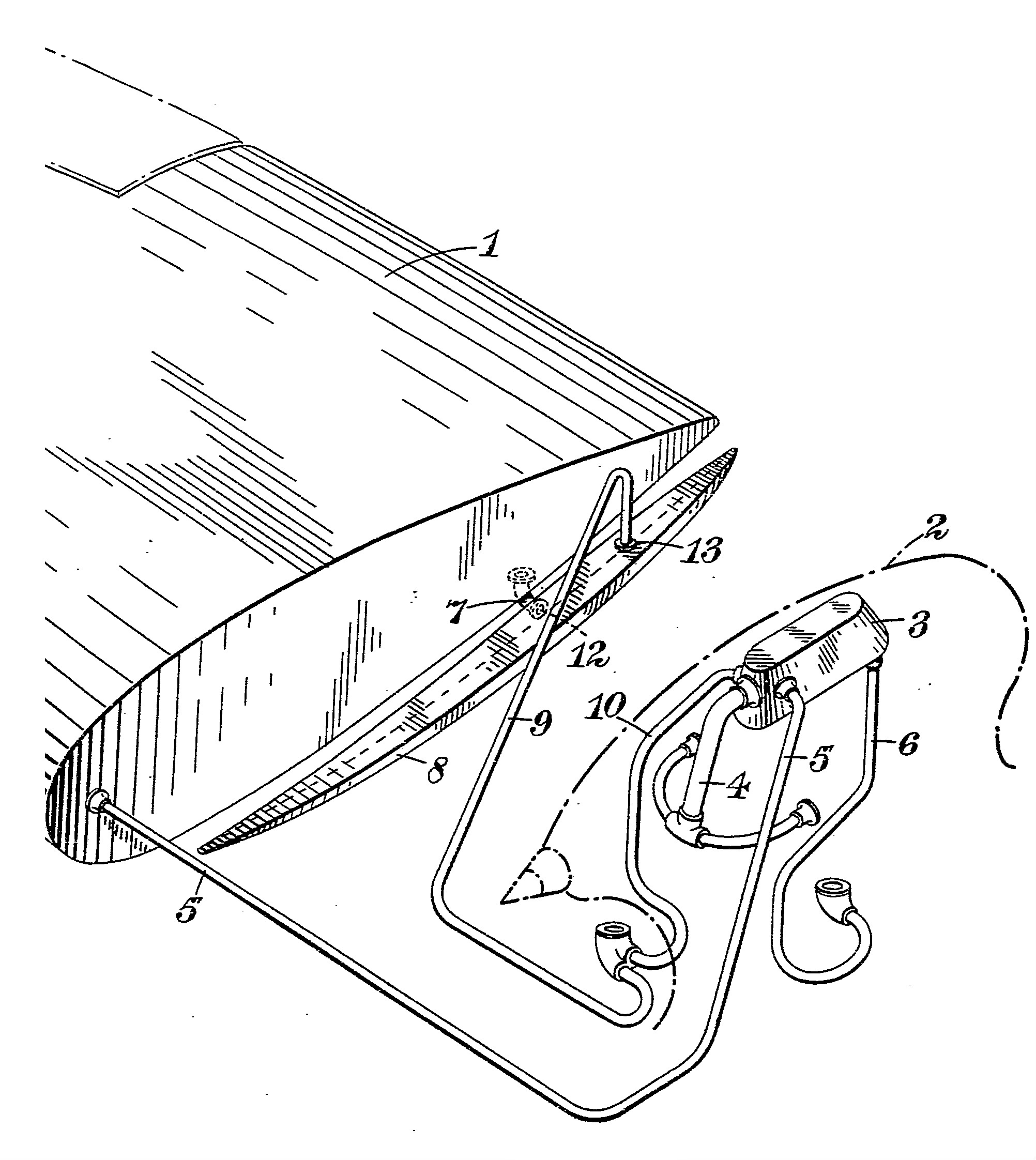
Mitchell's patent GB 329411 A

In February 1929, Mitchell submitted patent GB 329411 A, "Improvements in the Cooling System of Engines for Automotive Vehicles", a condenser to be placed within the wings of an aircraft. The Air Ministry rejected Supermarine's proposal for such a wing-cooled aircraft, but, in May 1929 a new specification allowed Mitchell to use his ideas again. A similar patent was submitted in 1931. The condenser was used in the Type 232, produced in April 1934, which was never put up for tender.

During the early 1930s, many of Mitchell's ideas never went past the early design stages. Attempts by the company to sell a 5-engined flying boat failed when a contract was cancelled in early 1932, leading to job losses and wage cuts at Supermarine. However, in 1933, the company's fortunes were revived when it received an order for 12 Scapas (previously the Southampton IV) under the specification R.19/33, the first contract for a new design by Mitchell since 1924. This order was followed by orders for the Supermarine Stranraer, which went into production in 1937.

After the first Seagull V flew in June 1933, the Royal Australian Air Force showed an interest, and 24 planes were ordered. The same year, the RAF placed an initial order of 12 aircraft, now renamed the Supermarine Walrus. Following the issuance of Air Ministry specification 5/36, Mitchell worked on a redesigned version of the Walrus, which was given the name Sea Otter. Work on the Sea Otter was completed after Mitchell's death in 1937, and it first flew in September 1938.

In October 1934, Mitchell published an article in the Daily Mirror, 'What is happening now in Air Transport?', in which he predicted that air transport would prove to be the safest form of transport.

=== Schneider trophy races (1922–1931) ===
Mitchell and his design team worked on a series of racing seaplanes, built to compete in the Schneider Trophy competition. His team included Alan Clifton (later head of the Technical Office), Arthur Shirvall, and Joseph Smith. These men were fundamental to Supermarine's success, as was the National Physical Laboratory (NPL), which provided invaluable support, guidance and scientific expertise in the form of detailed reports. The competition helped to place Mitchell at the forefront of aviation design.

==== Sea Lion series (early 1920s) ====
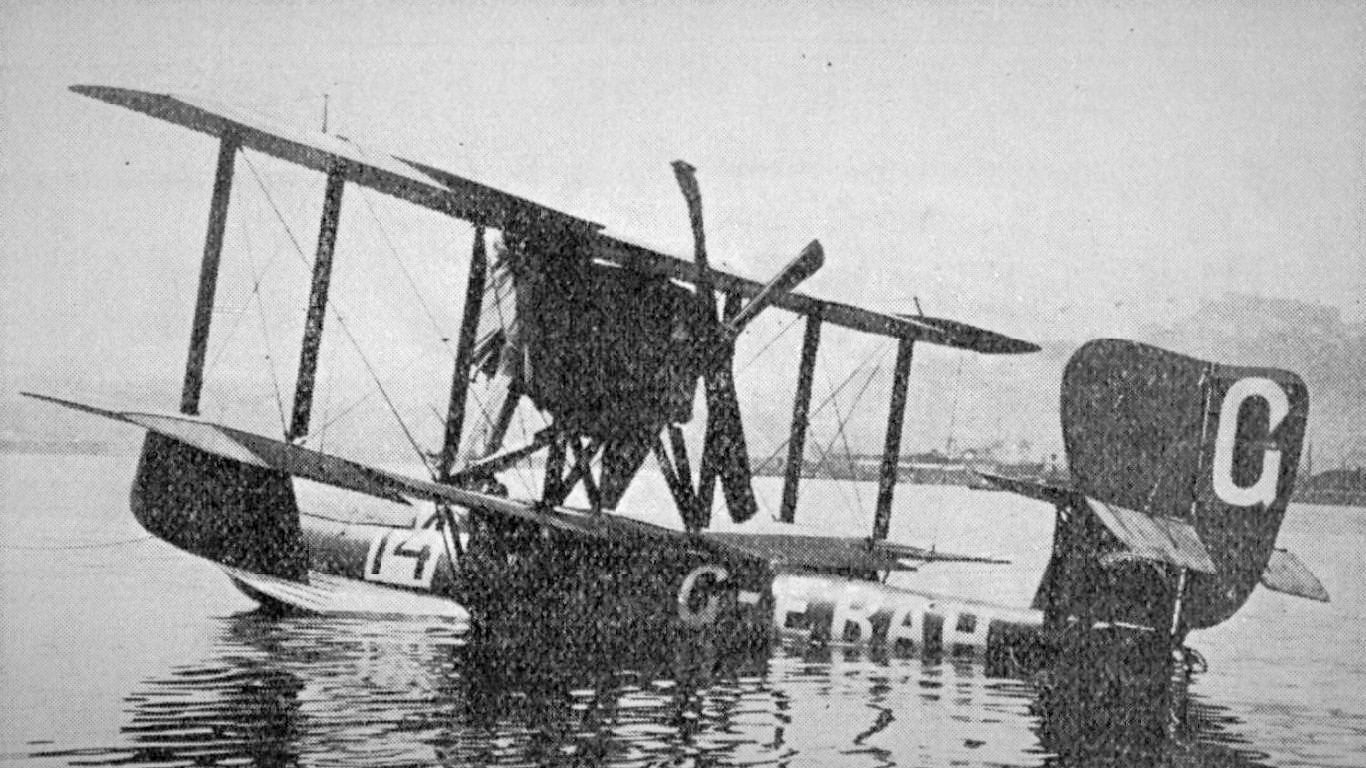
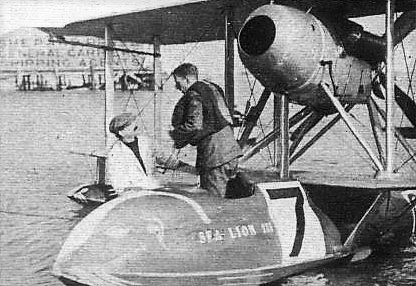
Mitchell's Supermarine Sea Lion II, which won the Schneider Trophy in 1922, and the Sea Lion III, the UK entry for the following year

Mitchell developed the Supermarine Sea King II to become the Sea Lion II, which competed for the 1922 Schneider Trophy in Naples. The Sea Lion II won the race, flying at an average speed of 145.7 miles per hour (234.5 km/h).

There was not enough time for Supermarine to design a new flying boat for the 1923 competition, so the Sea Lion II was borrowed back from the Air Ministry to allow Mitchell to adapt it. He increased its maximum speed by 10 knots (19 km/h; 12 mph), achieved with the assistance of D. Napier & Son, who supplied the 525 horsepower (391 kW) Lion III engine. To reduce the effects of drag forces, Mitchell reduced the wingspan from 32 to 28 feet (9.8 to 8.5 m), modified the struts, floats and hull, and changed the way the engines were fitted.

For the 1923 contest, two of the three British entrants were irreparably damaged before the race, leaving the Sea Lion III to compete alone. The United States team, flying Curtiss seaplanes, dominated the competition, with the winning pilot, David Rittenhouse, managing to reach a top speed of 177.27 miles per hour (285.29 km/h).

==== Supermarine S.4 (1925) ====
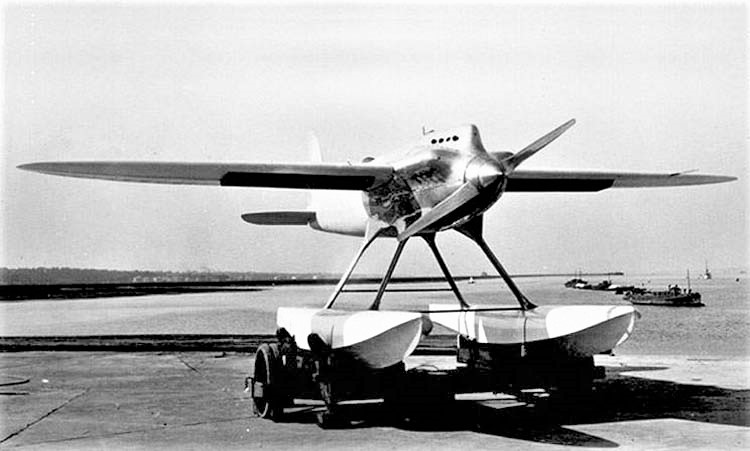
The Supermarine S.4, which crashed and sank during navigation trials in 1925

Even whilst the Sea Lion II was being modified at the Woolston works, Mitchell was working on a new plane, as Supermarine knew the American monoplane was the best design then available. The Supermarine S.4—the name was designated by Mitchell, with "S" standing for Schneider—was a joint Napier/Supermarine venture. The Supermarine team was backed by the Air Ministry, and had greater freedom than was given by the US government to their designers. The S.4 was described after Mitchell's death as "his first outstanding success". He used the practical experience gained when he designed its successor, the Supermarine S.5.

Mitchell was fully aware of the need to reduce drag to increase speed. His new design for was a mid-wing, cantilever floatplane. It was comparable to a French monoplane, the Bernard SIMB V.2, which broke the flight airspeed record in December 1924. The S.4 lacked the newly designed surface radiators, at that time still unavailable, but it was aerodynamic and aesthetically pleasing. Trial speeds reached 226.742 miles per hour (364.906 km/h) and created a sensation in the press.

The S.4 crashed before the 1925 race, for reasons that were never clearly established. On the day of the navigation trials it stalled before falling flat into the sea from 100 feet (30 m). When the pilot Henri Biard was rescued by a launch, Mitchell, who was on board the rescue launch, jokingly asked the injured man: "Is the water warm?"

==== 1926 and 1927 competitions ====
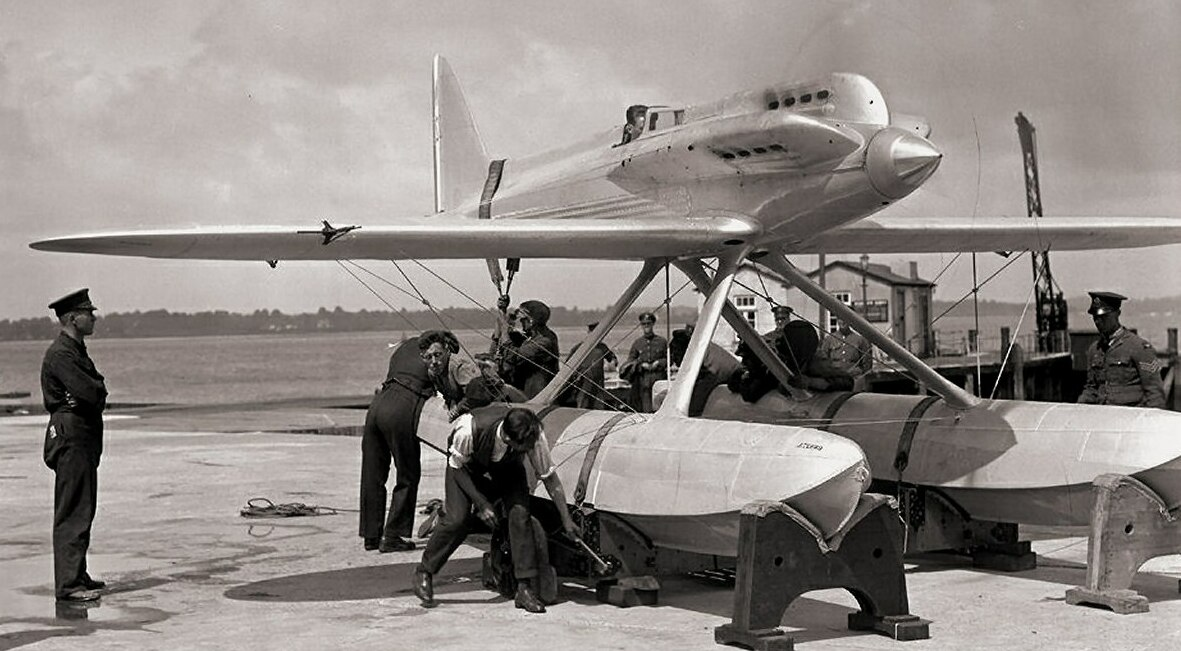
The Supermarine S.5, winner of the Schneider Trophy at Venice in 1927

The Air Ministry, the Society of British Aircraft Constructors and the Royal Aeronautical Society (RAeS) decided against challenging for the Schneider Trophy in 1926, but Mitchell was able to confirm that Supermarine would be ready for the race. His work at the NPL started in November that year. From wind tunnel tests at the NPL he learned that the S.4's radiators had created a third of the aircraft's total drag, and without this it would have been the most streamlined aircraft in the world. British aircraft companies intended to produce entries for the 1926 race, but the nature of the specifications issued by the Air Ministry meant that no aircraft could be completed and tested in time to be entered.

Two Supermarine S.5 seaplanes were entered for the 1927 contest, which was held in Venice. Mitchell understood that a monoplane on twin floats produced lower drag than any other aircraft type of its day, and was convinced by wind tunnel tests at the NPL that the cantilever wing design was too heavy and should be abandoned. The NPL had demonstrated that flat-surfaced skin radiators reduced drag better than the corrugated variety preferred by American designers, so Mitchell used them to improve the S.5. He reduced the fuselage cross section area so that it was 35 per cent less than the area of the S.4—and complained about the RAF's pilots being too large to fit into the resulting S.5's cockpit. The fuselage skin thickness was decreased by using duralumin.

Witnessed by the Italian dictator Benito Mussolini, along with a huge crowd gathered on the Venice Lido, the two Supermarine S.5s were the only seaplanes to finish the race, coming first and second. The third British entrant, a Gloster IV, along with the three Italian competitors flying Macchi M.52s, were forced to drop out of the race.

Mitchell had been elected to the RAeS in 1918. In 1927 he was awarded the society's silver medal. (Note: In January 1929, Mitchell was made a Fellow of the RAeS.) At the end of the year, he became the Technical Director at Supermarine. When the company was taken over by Vickers Ltd in 1928, he remained as Supermarine's chief designer—one of the conditions of the takeover was that he stay as a designer for the next five years.

==== Supermarine S.6 (1929) ====
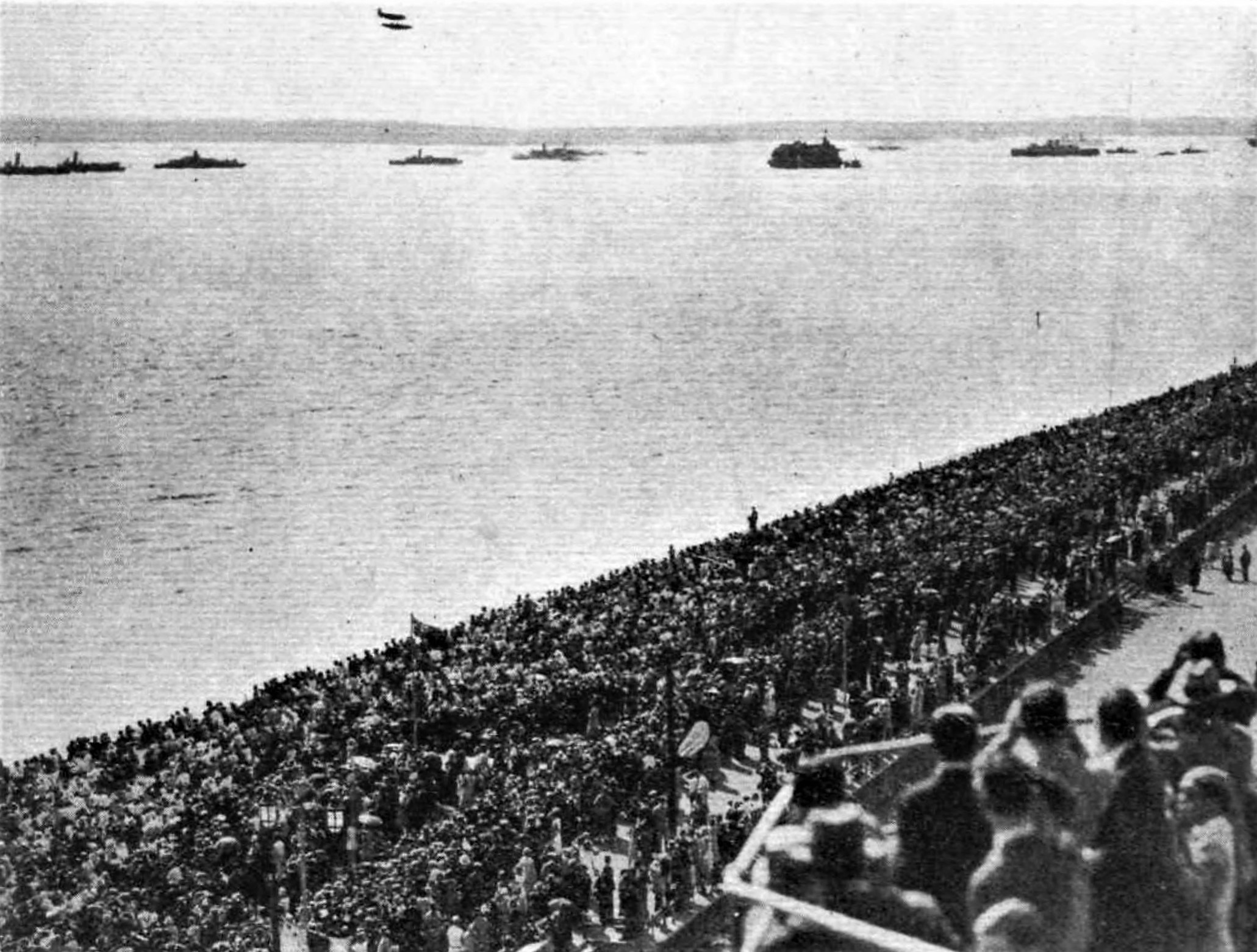
Spectators at Southsea on the day of the 1929 race watch as the winning Supermarine S.6 passes over

Interest in the competition waned after the 1927 race. There was no competition the following year, as the Fédération Aéronautique Internationale was persuaded by the Royal Aero Club to hold races every two years in the future.

Mitchell was among those who could see a more powerful engine than the Napier Lion was required for any aircraft that competed in future contests. The Air Ministry invited Rolls-Royce Ltd to design a new engine specifically for Supermarine's new seaplane, now designated the S.6. Rolls-Royce, under pressure to produce an engine in time and that matched S.6's streamlined shape, adopted the partially-developed 825 horsepower (615 kW) Buzzard. Mitchell in turn had to amend some of his design to accommodate the increase in total weight caused by introducing a larger engine, for instance by repositioning the forward float struts, and redesigning the engine cowling. The Air Ministry ordered two S.6 seaplanes, both of which were built by August 1929. Modifications to the seaplanes were made by Mitchell so the engines could be used at maximum power, as issues were discovered: the radiators were found to be inadequate; high engine torque made the S.6 move in a circle; and the centre of gravity was incorrectly positioned.

The 1929 race at Calshot was won by Supermarine with the S.6 attaining an average speed of 528.89 km/h (328.64 mph). Three of the four new aircraft were entered by the UK. The older Italian Macchi M.52R came second and Supermarine's backup, an S.5, took third place.

==== Supermarine S.6B (1931) ====
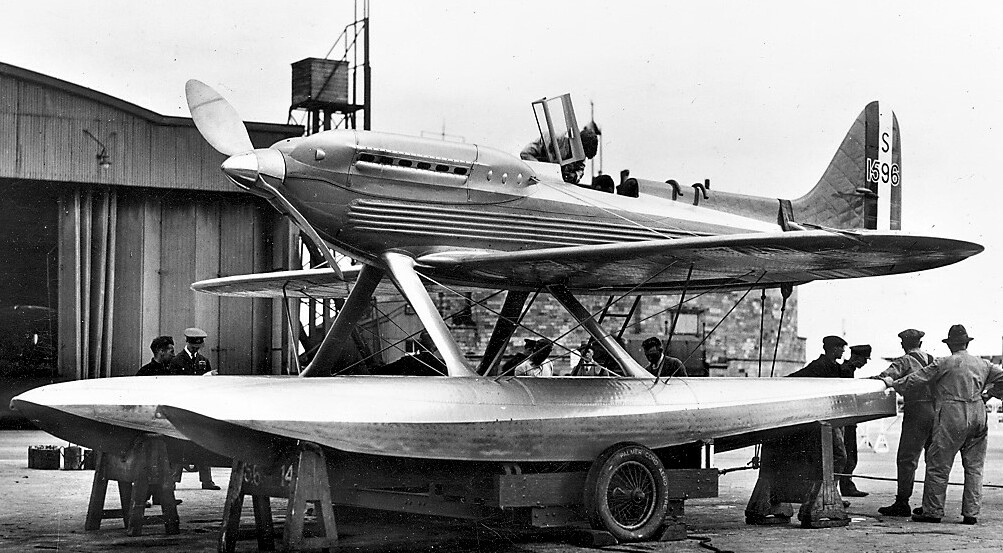
The Supermarine S.6B

Britain's final entry in the series, the Supermarine S.6B, marked the culmination of Mitchell's quest to "perfect the design of the racing seaplane". It was sponsored by a wealthy philanthropist, Lady Houston, who donated £100,000 (equivalent to £10 million in 2024) after the British Government decided not to enter an RAF team for the 1931 contest.

Mitchell opted to design an improved version of the S.6, whilst making as few changes as possible. The improvements that were made included a more powerful engine, and provision was made for such effects as the increase in engine-produced heat and extra torque, and the greater quantities of cooling oil and fuel required. The S.6B was a larger seaplane than the S.6, and had to be given a more efficient cooling system, and a stronger frame.

The S.6B competed the course successfully, and won the 1931 race. As the Schneider Trophy rules included the stipulation that the contest would end when any one country managed to win the trophy three times in five years, the S.6B's victory won the contest outright for Britain. The aircraft went on to break the world air speed record when it reached a speed of 407.5 miles per hour (655.8 km/h) that year. Mitchell was awarded the Commander of the Most Excellent Order of the British Empire (CBE) on 29 December 1931 for services in connection with the Schneider Trophy contest.

=== Type 224 ===
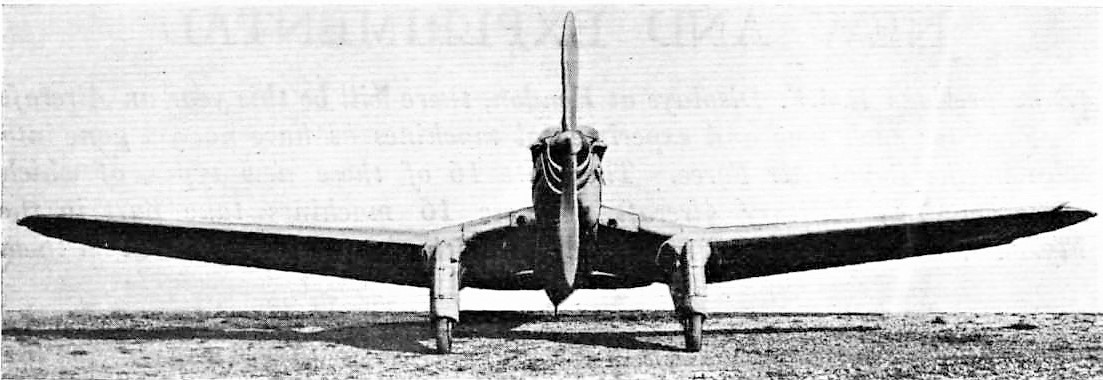
Supermarine Type 224

In 1930, specification F7/30 was issued for a fighter aircraft able to be used by both day and night squadrons. Mitchell's proposed design, the Type 224, was one of three monoplane designs made into prototypes for the Air Ministry. The final design incorporated an open cockpit, four Vickers machine guns, and a 660 horsepower (490 kW) Rolls-Royce Goshawk engine, along with a fixed undercarriage. Also included was an inverted gull wing, needed due to the demands of the engine's cooling system. The wing lacked flaps, a requirement for the aircraft to land at safe speeds.

Unofficially named the Spitfire, the Type 224 first flew in February 1934. The aircraft looked clumsy, and was inefficient, in part because the cooling system failed to prevent the engine from overheating. The RAF decided that the Type 224's performance was unsatisfactory, and selected the Gloster Gladiator in preference.

=== Supermarine Spitfire ===
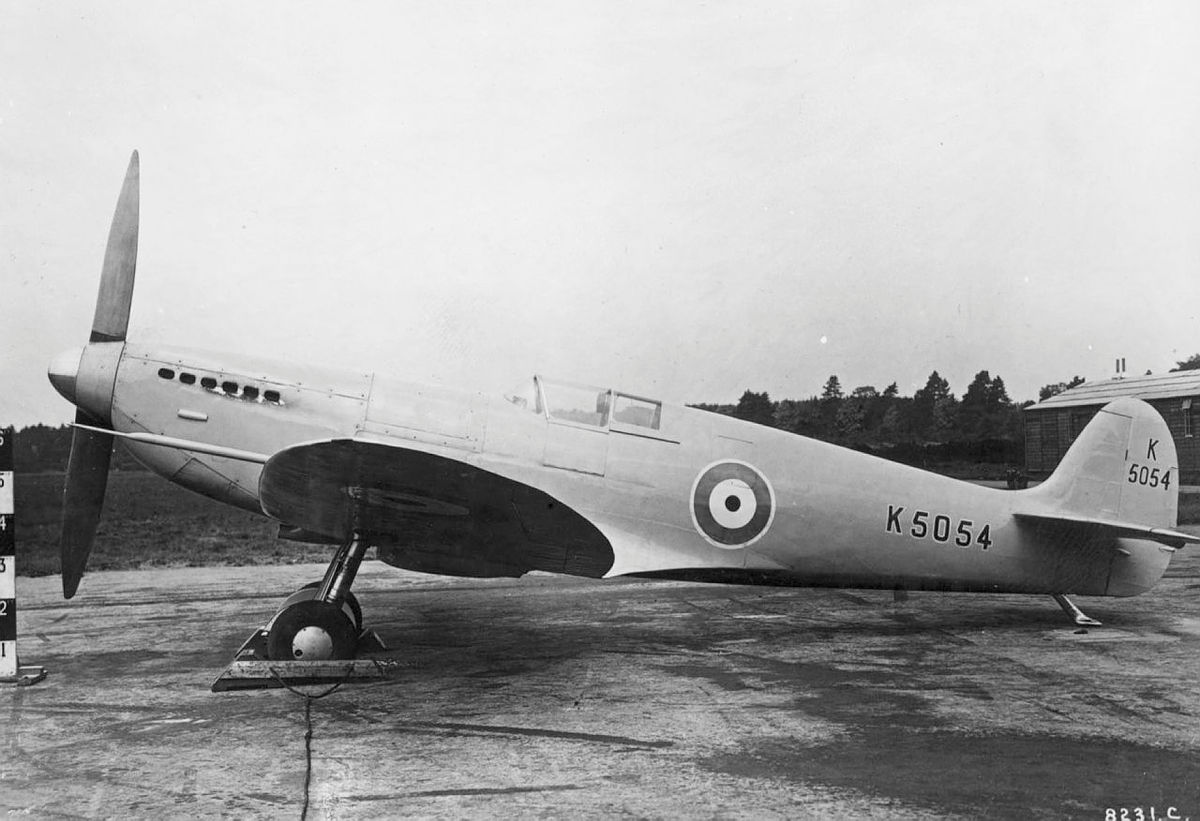
The Supermarine Spitfire prototype K5054 in 1936

Whilst the Type 224 was still being built in 1933, Mitchell was proceeding with the design of the Type 300. This was to become his masterpiece, the Supermarine Spitfire. (Note: Mitchell had no say in the name suggested for the new fighter. He is reported to have said: "It's the sort of bloody silly name they would choose.") He cleaned up the design of the Type 224, using the same engine but incorporating a shorter wing and a retractable undercarriage. The Air Ministry rejected Mitchell's design, but he modified it by making the wing thinner and shorter, by including the newly designed Rolls-Royce Merlin engine, and by making use of an innovative new cooling system—the latter being an example of his willingness to accept ideas from other people.

For a short period, design work continued using private funding, but in December 1934 the Air Ministry contracted Supermarine to construct a prototype that was based on Mitchell's design. Mitchell objected to the Air Ministry's insistence that the Spitfire be modified to have a tail wheel. At the time he was not told that, in preparation for a future war, the government had decided to build hard surface runways for the RAF, a decision that meant the modification to the Spitfire was necessary.

"I don't give a bugger whether [the wing shape] is elliptical or not, so long as it covers the guns!"

— R.J. Mitchell, quoted in Alfred Price, The Spitfire Story

The prototype, given the serial K5054, first flew on 6 March 1936, at Eastleigh, Hampshire. Mitchell witnessed the flight. Despite being ill, he travelled to Eastleigh during the flight tests for K5054. (Note: The aviation historian Alfred Price asserts that the date of K5054s maiden flight often given—5 March—is incorrect.) In June 1936, before the prototype had completed being trialled, the Air Ministry placed an order for 310 Spitfires.

Many of the technical advances in the Spitfire were made by people other than Mitchell: the thin elliptical wings were designed by the Canadian aerodynamicist Beverley Shenstone, and the Spitfire shared similarities with the Heinkel He 70 Blitz. The under-wing radiators had been designed by the Royal Aircraft Establishment, and monocoque construction had been first developed in the United States. Mitchell's achievement lay in the merger of these different influences into a single design, originating from his "unparalleled expertise in high-speed flight... and a brilliant practical engineering ability, exemplified in this instance by the incorporation of vital lessons learned from Supermarine's unsuccessful type 224 fighter". The quality of the design enabled the Spitfire to be continually improved throughout World War II.

== Illness and final years ==
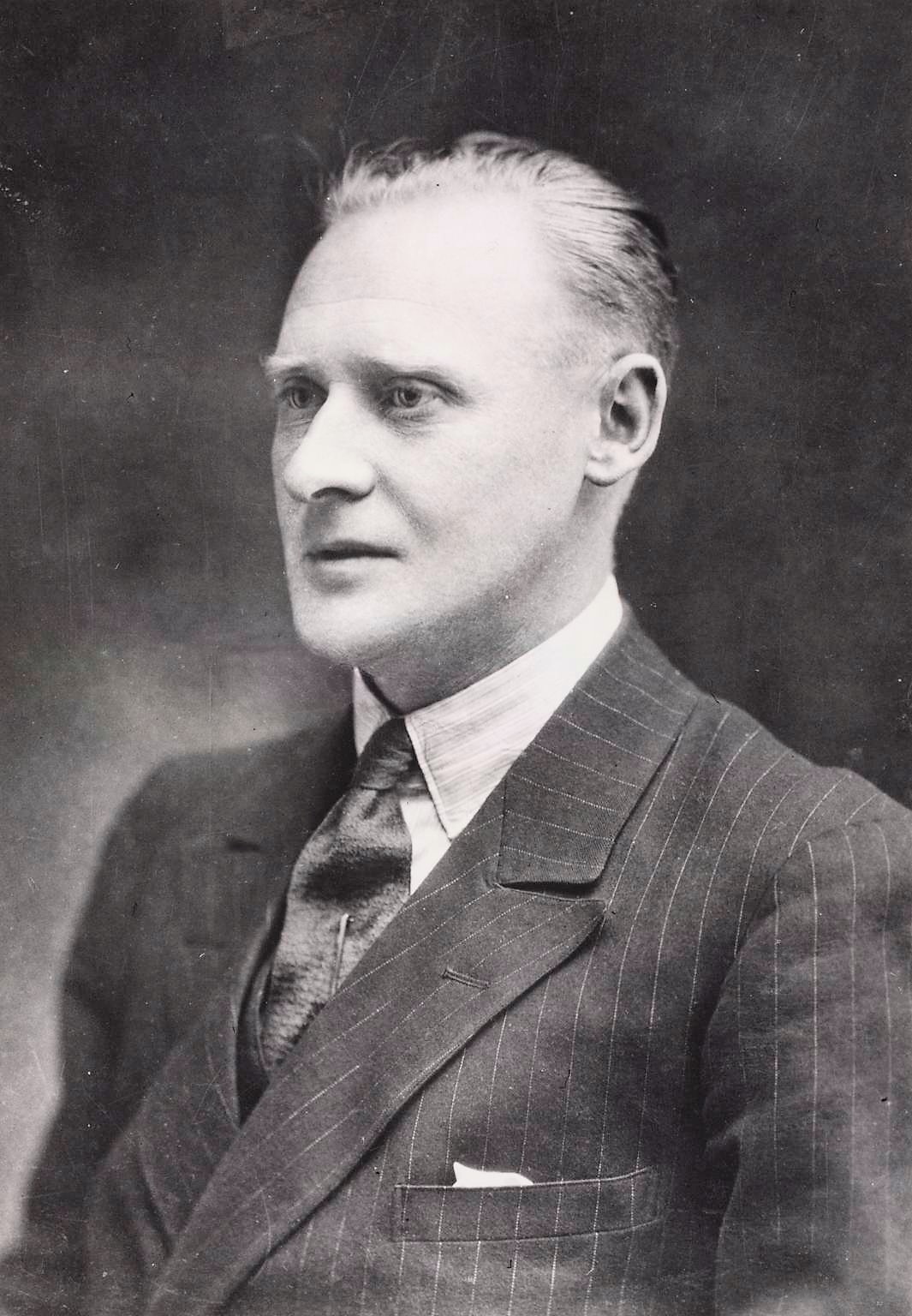
Mitchell in a portrait from 1933

In 1933, Mitchell underwent a permanent colostomy to treat rectal cancer, which left him permanently disabled. Despite this, he continued to work on the Spitfire and a four-engined bomber, the Type 317. Unusually for an aircraft designer in those days, he took flying lessons. He obtained his pilot's licence and made his first solo flight in July 1934.

In 1936, Mitchell was diagnosed again with cancer, and early, the following year, was forced by his illness to give up work. In his absence, his assistant Harold Payn led the design team at Supermarine. Mitchell flew to Vienna for specialist treatment, and remained there for a month, but returned home after the treatment proved to be ineffective. He died at home in Highfield, Southampton, on 11 June 1937 at the age of 42. He was cremated and his ashes were buried at South Stoneham Cemetery, Southampton.

The quality of the flying boats designed by Mitchell for the RAF established him as the foremost aircraft designer in Britain. His obituary published in The Journal of the Royal Aeronautical Society in 1937 described him as "brilliant" and "one of the leading designers in the world". The Society paid tribute to their colleague, describing him as being "a quiet, subtle, not obvious genius" who had "an intuitive capacity for grasping the essentials, getting to the point and staying there". Smith, who became Chief Designer at Supermarine after Mitchell's death, said of him that "He was an inveterate drawer on drawings, particularly general arrangements,... [which were] usually accepted when the thing was redrawn."

== Posthumous recognition ==
Mitchell's career was dramatised in the British 1942 film The First of the Few. He was portrayed by Leslie Howard, who also produced and directed the film. (Note: The First of the Few was released in the United States as Spitfire.)

The Mitchell Memorial Youth Theatre, now known as Mitchell Arts Centre, was opened in Stoke-on-Trent in 1957 after £50,000 (equivalent to £1.426 million in 2024) was raised by public subscription. Butt Lane Junior School, was renamed as the Reginald Mitchell County Primary School in 1959, and Hanley High School was renamed Mitchell High School in 1989. The R J Mitchell Primary School at Hornchurch, originally named the Mitchell Junior School when it opened on 2 December 1968, is also named in his honour. Supermarine Spitfires piloted by Commonwealth and European airmen flew from RAF Hornchurch.

In 1986, Mitchell was inducted into the International Air & Space Hall of Fame at the San Diego Air & Space Museum. The American philanthropist Sidney Frank unveiled a statue of Mitchell at the Science Museum, London, in 2005. The slate drawing board's surface depicts the drawing of the prototype Spitfire from June 1936. The stone sculpture was created by Stephen Kettle and given to the museum by the Sidney E. Frank Foundation.

There are plaques dedicated to Mitchell at his Southampton home, and his birthplace in Butt Lane. Papers relating to his work at Supermarine are preserved at the archives of the Royal Air Force Museum London. Southampton Solent University's tallest building is also named after Mitchell.

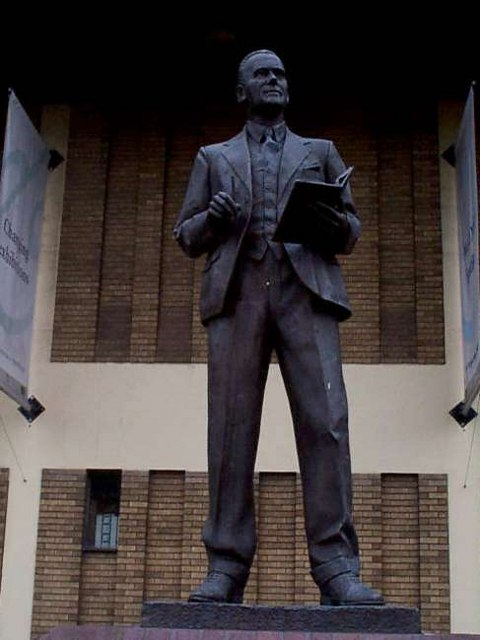
The bronze statue of Reginald Mitchell, by Colin Melbourne, Hanley, Stoke-on-Trent, unveiled in 1995.

A bronze statue of Mitchell was unveiled in Hanley, Stoke-on-Trent, on 21 May 1995. The statue, by Colin Melbourne, was commissioned by Stoke-on-Trent City Council, and stands outside The Potteries Museum & Art Gallery. The statue depicts Mitchell wearing a suit, holding a pen in his right hand and a book in his left.

The Potteries Museum & Art Gallery, in Hanley, Stoke-on-Trent, is home to a Mark XVI Spitfire (RW388), which was donated to Stoke-on-Trent in 1972 by the RAF, to honour the city's connection to Reginald Mitchell.

Southampton City Art Gallery holds an oil painting of Mitchell, painted in 1942 by Frank Ernest Beresford.

== Personality ==
Mitchell was by nature a reserved and modest man. He was a reticent public speaker who disliked presenting papers. According to one member of his department, "he said nothing unless there was something worth saying". He avoided publicity, and was not widely known to the general public until after his death.

According to his son Gordon, Mitchell was resentful of authority being imposed on him or of the routines of the workplace, and was short-tempered and "a difficult man to live with sometimes". Often given full scope at Supermarine, he was a strict taskmaster who nevertheless struggled with the level of organisation needed for a company such as Supermarine. When the engineer Barnes Wallis was employed to improve the efficiency of Mitchell's department in 1930, Wallis had to be recalled after their personalities clashed. The ODNB describes Mitchell as being highly gifted and intelligent, but someone who was "often stern and irascible towards those less gifted than himself". He was devoted to his staff at Supermarine, to whom he showed kindness and humanity, and they in turn repaid him with loyalty and affection.

== Sources ==
- Andrews, Charles F.; Morgan, Eric B. (2003). Supermarine Aircraft Since 1914 (2nd revised ed.). London: Putnam Aeronautical.
- Eves, Edward; Coombs, L. F. E (2001). The Schneider Trophy Story. St. Paul, Minnesota: MBI. ISBN 978-07603-1-118-9.
- Glancey, Jonathan (2008). Spitfire: The Illustrated Biography. London: Atlantic Books. ISBN 978-18435-4-799-0.
- Hillman, Jo; Higgs, Colin (2020). Supermarine Southampton: The Flying Boat That Made R.J. Mitchell. Barnsley, UK: Pen & Sword Books Limited. ISBN 978-15267-8-497-1.
- McKinstry, Leo (2007). Spitfire: Portrait of a Legend. London: John Murray. ISBN 978-0-7195-6874-9. (registration required)
- Mason, Francis K. (1964). The Gloster Gladiator. London: Profile Publications. OCLC 752719524.
- Mitchell, Gordon (2002). R.J. Mitchell: Schooldays to Spitfire. London: Tempus Publishing. ISBN 978-0-7524-3727-9.
- Pegram, Ralph (2016). Beyond the Spitfire: The Unseen Designs of R.J. Mitchell. Brimscombe Port: The History Press. ISBN 978-0-7509-6515-6.
- Price, Alfred (1977). Spitfire: A Documentary History. New York: Macdonald and Jane's. ISBN 978-0-684-16060-3.
- Price, Alfred (2002). The Spitfire Story. London: Silverdale Books. ISBN 978-1-85605-702-8.
- Quill, Jeffrey (2011). Spitfire: A Test Pilot's Story. Oxford: Isis. ISBN 978-07531-9-548-2.
- Richie, Sebastian (2004). "Mitchell, Reginald Joseph". Oxford Dictionary of National Biography (online ed.). Oxford University Press. doi:10.1093/ref:odnb/35046. OCLC 56568095. (Subscription, Wikipedia Library access or UK public library membership required.) (subscription may be required or content may be available in libraries that are in the UK)
- Smith, Richard C. (2008). Hornchurch Offensive: The Definitive Account of the RAF Fighter Airfield, its Pilots, Groundcrew and Staff, 1941 to the Airfield's Final Closure. Grub Street Publishing. ISBN 978-19091-6-673-8.

=== Further reading ===
- Shelton, John (2008). Schneider Trophy to Spitfire: The Design Career of R.J. Mitchell (Hardback). Sparkford: Hayes Publishing. ISBN 978-1-84425-530-6.
- Shelton, John (2015). From Nighthawk to Spitfire: The Aircraft of R.J. Mitchell. History Press. ISBN 978-07509-6-550-7.
