= David Baker (author) =

British writer (born 1944)

David Baker (born 3 June 1944) is a prolific British space author and self-described space scientist. His description of his career is that he first visited the United States in 1962 and returned to work for NASA on the Gemini, Apollo, and Space Shuttle programs between 1965 and 1984 as a Mission Planning and Analysis Department.

He returned to the United Kingdom in 1984 and set up an independent consultancy helping countries around the world including India to develop and integrate commercial space technologies for their national space programmes.

He now works as a journalist, writer, and an author. He has published thousands of articles, more than 100 books and contributed to many radio and TV documentaries about space missions in the United States and Europe. In the past, he has edited the Aerospace Review, Jane's Aircraft Upgrades and Jane's Space Directory. He is a fellow of the British Interplanetary Society (BIS) and from 2011 until his resignation in 2021 he was the editor of the BIS's monthly journal, Spaceflight.

== Allegations of fraud ==
On 18 March 2021, David Whitehouse, a science journalist and former BBC News science editor, raised allegations on Twitter that Baker's reported professional credentials and Apollo career history were fraudulent. The BIS issued a statement on 21 March that it was aware of these allegations, and that the Society would "re-consider any impact of these allegations on the Society". On 25 March 2021, Baker resigned as editor of Spaceflight.

== Bibliography ==
- The Race for Space – The Story of the space race in six volumes written with co-author Anatoly Zak (2018)
- The Apollo Missions: The Incredible Story of the Race to the Moon (from 29 June 2019)
- Baker, David, ed. (1999). Jane’s Space Directory 1999–2000 (15th ed.). Surrey: Jane's Information Group. ISBN 0-7106-1919-7.
- Baker, David, ed. (2001). Jane’s Space Directory 2001–2002 (17th ed.). Surrey: Jane's Information Group. ISBN 0-7106-2330-5.
- Baker, David, ed. (2002). Jane’s Space Directory 2002–2003 (18th ed.). Surrey: Jane's Information Group. ISBN 0-7106-2448-4.
- Baker, David, ed. (2004). Jane’s Space Directory 2004–2005 (20th ed.). Surrey: Jane's Information Group. ISBN 0-7106-2638-X.
- Baker, David, ed. (2004). Jane’s Space Directory 2005–2006 (21st ed.). Surrey: Jane's Information Group. ISBN 0-7106-2706-8.
