= Supermarine Sea King =

1920s British amphibious fighter aircraft

Sea King
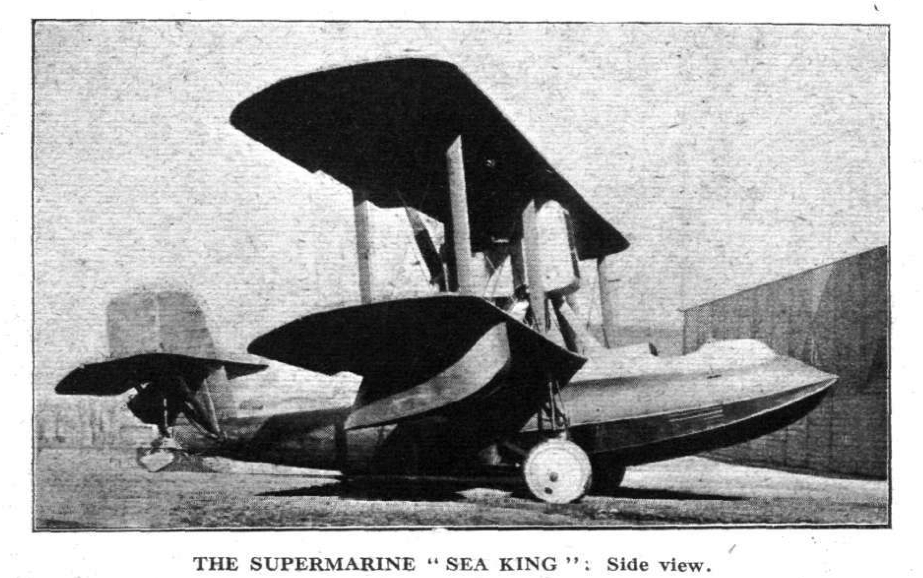
- Supermarine Sea King II

General information
- Type: fighter aircraft
- National origin: United Kingdom
- Manufacturer: Supermarine
- Designer: R. J. Mitchell
- Number built: 2

History
- First flight: Early 1920

The Supermarine Sea King was a British single-seat amphibious biplane fighter designed by Supermarine in 1919. Developed from the Supermarine Baby and the Supermarine Sea Lion I, the Sea King was a single seater biplane powered by a pusher 160 horsepower (120 kW) Beardmore engine. It first flew in early 1920 and was exhibited by Supermarine at the 1920 Olympia Show in London. The company released drawings of the aircraft's design prior to the show; what it exhibited was probably a modified Supermarine Baby.

The Sea King was redesigned by Supermarine's new chief designer Reginald Mitchell in 1921, perhaps in order to meet the Air Ministry's specifications for a fighter aircraft capable of operating both from an aircraft carrier and from the water. Designated as the Sea King II, it was powered by a 300 horsepower (220 kW) Hispano-Suiza 8 engine. It first flew in December 1921 and demonstrated excellent manoeuvrability and stability, but was not selected for production. It was rebuilt by Mitchell and fitted with a Napier Lion engine; renamed as the Sea Lion II, it went on to win the Schneider Trophy race in 1922.

== Design and development ==
=== Sea King I ===
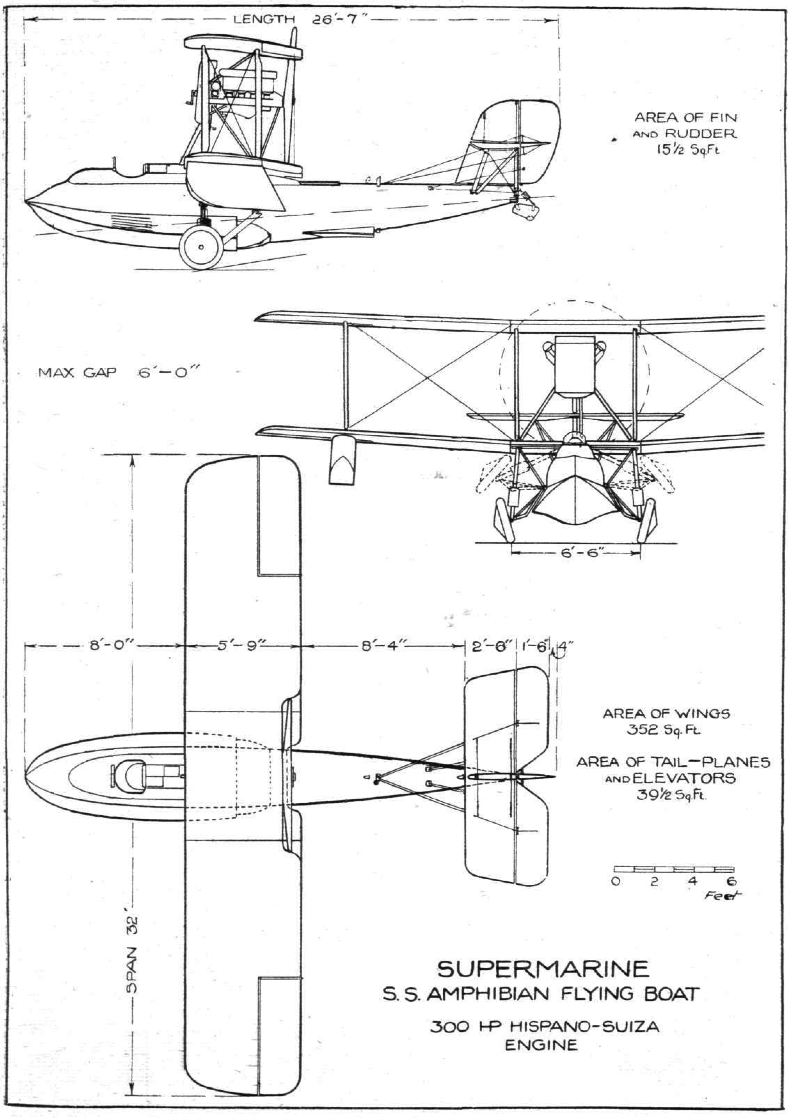
The general arrangement drawings for the Supermarine Sea King I

On 29 October 1919, Supermarine commenced design of a single seat flying boat fighter. It was developed from the Supermarine Baby and an aircraft developed from it, the Supermarine Sea Lion I. The prototype of the Baby had first flown upon its completion in February 1918, but never saw action during World War I. and was no longer used after the end of the war. The Sea Lion I had participated in the 1919 Schneider Trophy race, the results of which were annulled when the race ended in chaos due to the fog.

The resulting aircraft, known as the Sea King, was a single seater biplane powered by a pusher 160 horsepower (120 kW) Beardmore engine. Few details about the design in its original form are known. The aircraft's machine gun mounting was positioned low enough for the pilot to have an unobstructed view ahead of him.

=== Sea King II ===
In 1921, Reginald Mitchell, by now chief designer of Supermarine, produced a revised design of the Sea King. This was perhaps done to meet the requirements of Specification N6/22, which required the design of a fighter aircraft capable of operating both from the deck of an aircraft carrier and from water. In December 1921, six months after the completion of the design, the aircraft was built and ready for tests.

The resulting Sea King II was a single seat biplane, with a wooden hull, a retractable main landing gear and a fixed tail skid. The tail—now greatly modified—was of monoplane type mounted halfway up the single fin with a single rudder; both fin and rudder were larger than those of the Sea King I. The aircraft was powered by a single 300 horsepower (220 kW) Hispano-Suiza 8 engine. The Sea King II's starting handle and the petrol cap were accessed from behind the pilot's seat. The undercarriage struts were designed to ensure shocks to the hull were reduced when the machine landed. A unique feature of the Sea King II was a tube that ran through the hull to supply air to the rear step. (Note: A step is a break in the bottom of a flying boat.)

The Sea King II was the first aircraft designed by Mitchell after having become Chief Designer at Supermarine in 1919. He designed it with ease of maintenance in mind—the engine was mounted independently of the wings, and only 18 bolts needed to be removed to take off the wing structure, the power unit and the undercarriage.

== Operational history ==
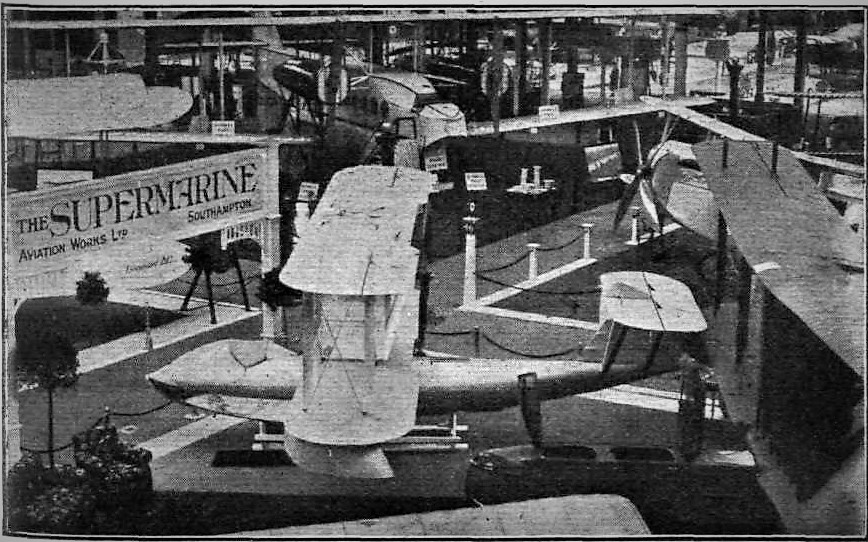
The Supermarine Sea King I at the Olympia Show in 1920

The Sea King I is thought to have first flown in early 1920 following its construction, although it may not ever have flown, as it was never registered. the exact date and the name of the test pilot are unknown. The aircraft was exhibited by Supermarine at the 1920 Olympia Show in London, where it was the sole example of a single-seat seaplane fighter at the show. Supermarine released drawings of the Sea King's design prior to the show; the aircraft exhibited was probably a modified N60 Baby. There is evidence that modifications to the wing structure had been undertaken before the aircraft appeared at Olympia, and that its performance improved when it was flown using a Siddeley Puma engine.

The Sea King II was registered as E-BAH in December 1921—when it was named as the Supermarine Amphibian Scout—and first flew that month. During trials it demonstrated excellent manoeuvrability and stability, without 'porpoising' or bouncing when coming into contact with water. It was not selected for production, and the Fairey Flycatcher and the Parnall Plover, both biplanes that could be converted between having conventional tailwheel undercarriage and floats, were ordered in small numbers for further evaluation. The Flycatcher succeeded in being selected to equip the Royal Navy's aircraft carriers.

== Legacy ==
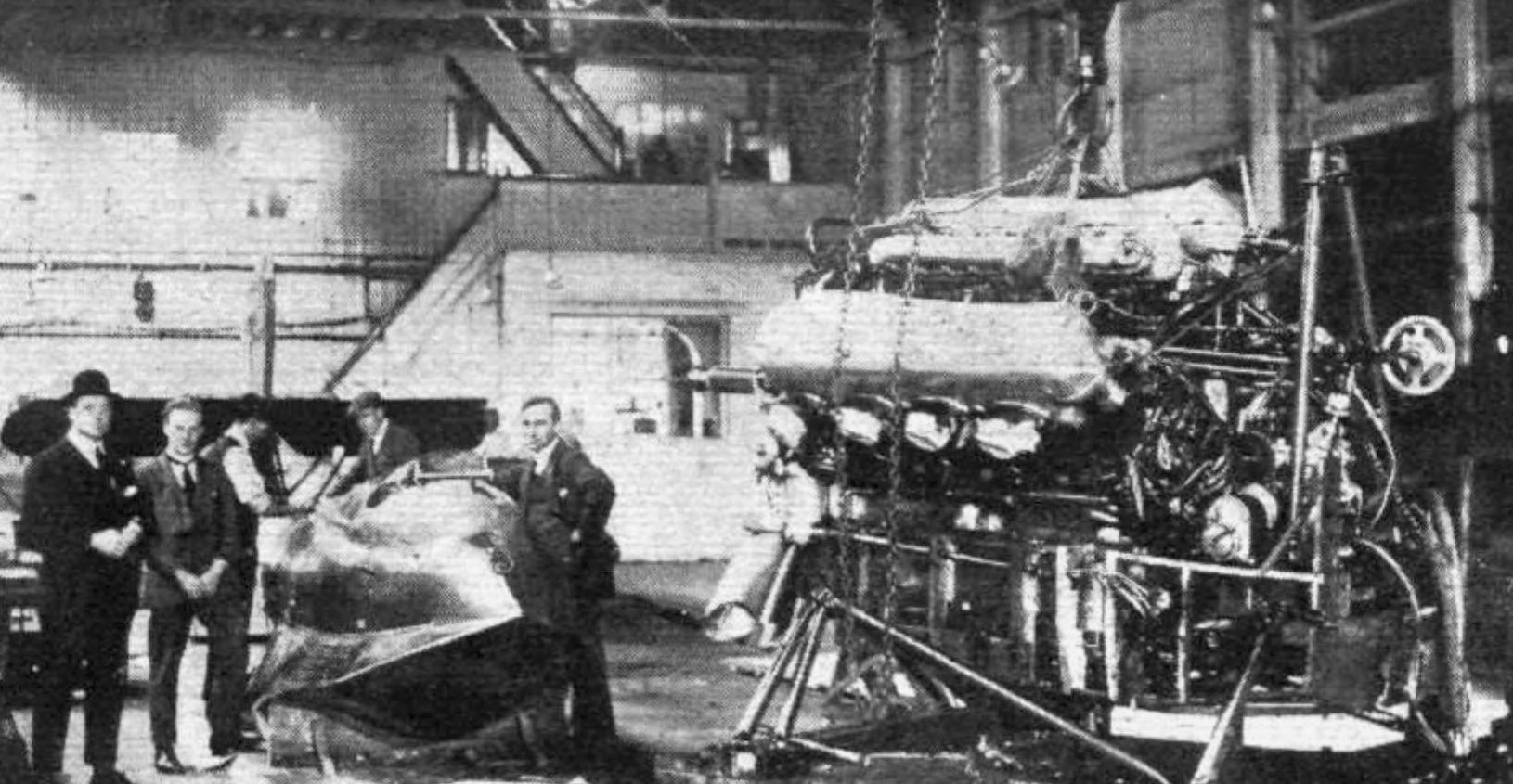
The Sea Lion II's hull and Napier Lion engine on display. R.J. Mitchell is standing second from the left.

The Sea King II was rebuilt by Mitchell as a racing flying boat and fitted with a Napier Lion engine to become the Supermarine Sea Lion II, which won the 1922 Schneider Trophy contest. The Sea Lion II was powered with a 450 hp (340 kW) Napier Lion engine, loaned by Napier. The new engine resulted in an increase in power of 50 per cent. The aircraft won the race at an average speed of 145.7 mph (234.5 km/h). The victory was the first post-World War I success by a British aircraft in an international competition, and generated a large amount of publicity for Supermarine.

== Variants ==
Sea King I
Flying boat fighter. Powered by 160 horsepower (120 kW) Beardmore or 240 horsepower (180 kW) Siddeley Puma engine. One aircraft was built.
Sea King II
A revised Sea King I, converted in 1922. Powered by 300 horsepower (220 kW) Hispano engine.

== Specifications (Sea King I) ==
Data from Supermarine Aircraft since 1914

General characteristics

- Crew: 1
- Length: 27 ft 4 in (8.33 m)
- Wingspan: 35 ft 6 in (10.82 m) - 5 feet 1 inch (1.55 m) more than the lower span.
- Height: 11 ft 7 in (3.53 m)
- Wing area: 339 sq ft (31.5 m^{2})
- Empty weight: 2,115 lb (959 kg)
- Gross weight: 2,500 lb (1,134 kg) when fitted with the Beardmore engine
- Fuel capacity: 50 gallons
- Powerplant: 1 × Beardmore air-cooled piston engine, 160 hp (120 kW)
- Propellers: fixed-pitch pusher propeller

Performance

- Maximum speed: 110.5 mph (177.8 km/h, 96.0 kn) at sea level

== Specifications (Sea King II) ==
Data from Supermarine Aircraft since 1914

General characteristics

- Crew: 1
- Length: 26 ft 9 in (8.15 m)
- Wingspan: 32 ft 0 in (9.75 m)
- Height: 11 ft 7 in (3.53 m)
- Wing area: 352 sq ft (32.7 m^{2})
- Empty weight: 2,115 lb (959 kg)
- Gross weight: 2,850 lb (1,293 kg)
- Fuel capacity: 50 gallons
- Powerplant: 1 × Hispano-Suiza 8F V-8 water-cooled piston engine, 300 hp (220 kW)
- Propellers: 4-bladed fixed-pitch pusher propeller

Performance

- Maximum speed: 125 mph (201 km/h, 109 kn) at sea level
- Endurance: 2 hours
- Time to altitude: 10,000 ft (3,048 m) in 12 minutes
- Wing loading: 8.1 lb/sq ft (40 kg/m^{2})
- Power/mass: 8.4 lb/hp

Armament

- Guns: 1 × fixed forward-firing 0.303 in (7.7 mm) Lewis Gun

== See also ==
- List of flying boats and floatplanes

== Sources ==
- Andrews, Charles Ferdinand; Morgan, Eric B. (1981). Supermarine Aircraft since 1914. London: Putnam. ISBN 978-03701-0-018-0.
- Bruce, J. M. (1957). British Aeroplanes 1914–18. London: Putnam. ISBN 978-03700-0-038-1.
- Jackson, A. J. (1988). British Civil Aircraft 1919–1972: Volume III. London: Putnam. ISBN 978-0-85177-818-1.
- Lewis, Peter. (1979). The British Fighter since 1912: sixty-seven years of design and development. London: Putnam. ISBN 978-03701-0-049-4.
- Pegram, Ralph (2016). Beyond the Spitfire: The Unseen Designs of R.J. Mitchell. Pegram: The History Press. ISBN 978-0-7509-6515-6.
- Price, Alfred (2002). The Spitfire Story. London: Silverdale Books. ISBN 978-1-85605-702-8.
- Rathbun, John B. (1918). Aeroplane Construction and Operation: including notes on aeroplane design and aerodynamic calculation, materials, etc. Chicago: Stanton and Van Vliet Co. OCLC 931771672.
