= Henry Biard =

British pilot (1892–1966)

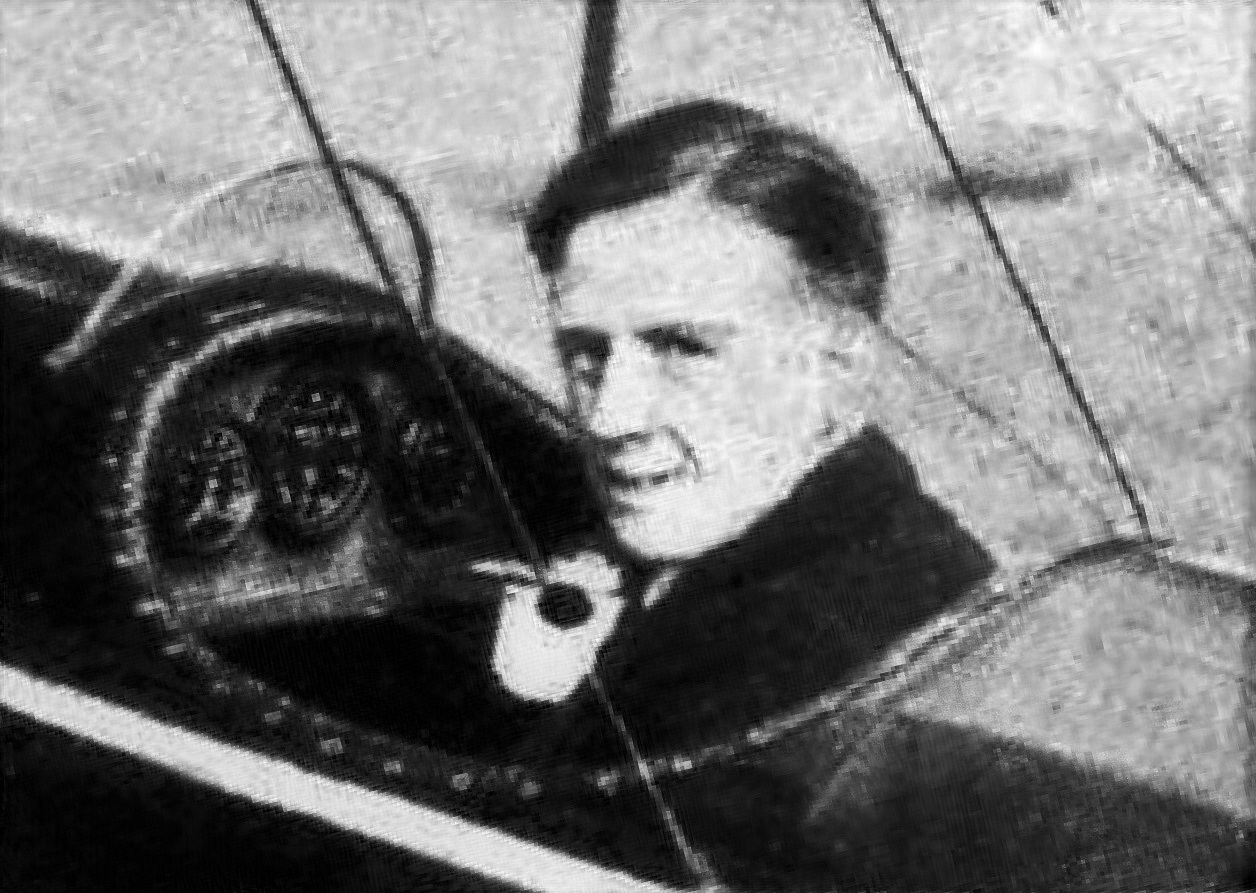
- Biard at the controls of a Supermarine Sparrow in 1924
- Born: Henri Charles Amédée de La Faye Biard; 1 January 1892; Godalming
- Died: 18 January 1966 (aged 74); Charminster
- Education: Victoria College, Jersey
- Military career
- Allegiance: United Kingdom
- Branch: Royal Flying Corps (1913‍–‍1914); Royal Naval Air Service (1917‍–‍1918); Royal Air Force (1918‍–‍1919; 1939‍–‍1944)
- Rank: Flying officer (Note: Biard is often referred to as "Captain Biard" in contemporary and later sources, but never held this military rank.)
- Service number: 70062
- Known for: 1922 Schneider Trophy victory
- Wars: First World War; Second World War
- Other work: Chief test pilot for Supermarine (1919‍–‍1933)

Henry Biard (also known as Henri) (Note: Biard described himself as Anglo-French, and used both names.) was a British pilot and aircraft racer. As chief test pilot for the British aircraft manufacturer Supermarine, he won the 1922 Schneider Trophy air race and briefly held the world record for the fastest speed in a seaplane.

Biard was born in Surrey, where his father worked as a public school teacher, and spent time as a child on his mother's native island of Jersey, where he was educated at Victoria College. He first learned to fly in 1910 at the school of Claude Grahame-White in Hendon, and gained his aviator's certificate in 1912. He joined and resigned from the Royal Flying Corps shortly before the outbreak of the First World War, then worked as a flying instructor at the Grahame-White school. In 1917, he joined the Royal Naval Air Service, where he instructed pilots, flew anti-submarine patrols and saw aerial combat over the Western Front.

Biard joined Supermarine after being demobilised from the Royal Air Force, the successor to the RNAS, in 1919, and became a close colleague of R. J. Mitchell, the company's chief designer. He tested many Mitchell-designed aircraft, including the Swan, the Southampton, the Seagull and the Scarab. He was also the pilot for three of Supermarine's entries into the Schneider Trophy, winning the race in 1922, placing third in 1923 and being forced to withdraw after crashing his aircraft, the experimental Supermarine S4, the day before the 1925 race. Shortly beforehand, on 13 September 1925, he had set a world speed record of 226.75 mph (364.92 km/h) for a seaplane over 3 miles (4.8 km).

After Supermarine's acquisition by Vickers (Aviation) Ltd in 1928, Biard lost his position as chief test pilot. He continued to work for the company until 1933, and released his autobiography, Wings, in 1934. During the Second World War, he re-joined the RAF, but resigned his commission in 1944 on the grounds of ill health. He settled with his wife in Guernsey, and died in Charminster on 18 January 1966.

== Early life (1892–1919) ==
Henri Charles Amédée de La Faye Biard was born in Godalming, Surrey, on 1 January 1892. He was the second of three sons of Raymond Biard, (Note: Also reported as Auguste Raymond Biard.) a Frenchman working as an assistant French master at Charterhouse School, and Lucy Constance Delmaine, a native of St Helier, Jersey. Henry Biard learned to swim at the age of four, and was described as a "water baby" in a 1958 article in The Liverpool Echo; he remained a keen swimmer and fisherman throughout his life.

Biard attended Victoria College, a public school in Jersey, between 1906 and 1907. The family lived at 2 Claremont Terrace in St Helier. They left the island in 1908: the Jersey historian Barrie Bertram has suggested that this was a consequence of a criminal charge made against Lucy Delmaine in May, by which she was accused of taking an eighteen-year-old woman, Elizabeth Mary Price, into her home "for the purposes of debauchery" with her eldest son, Raymond, who was nineteen.

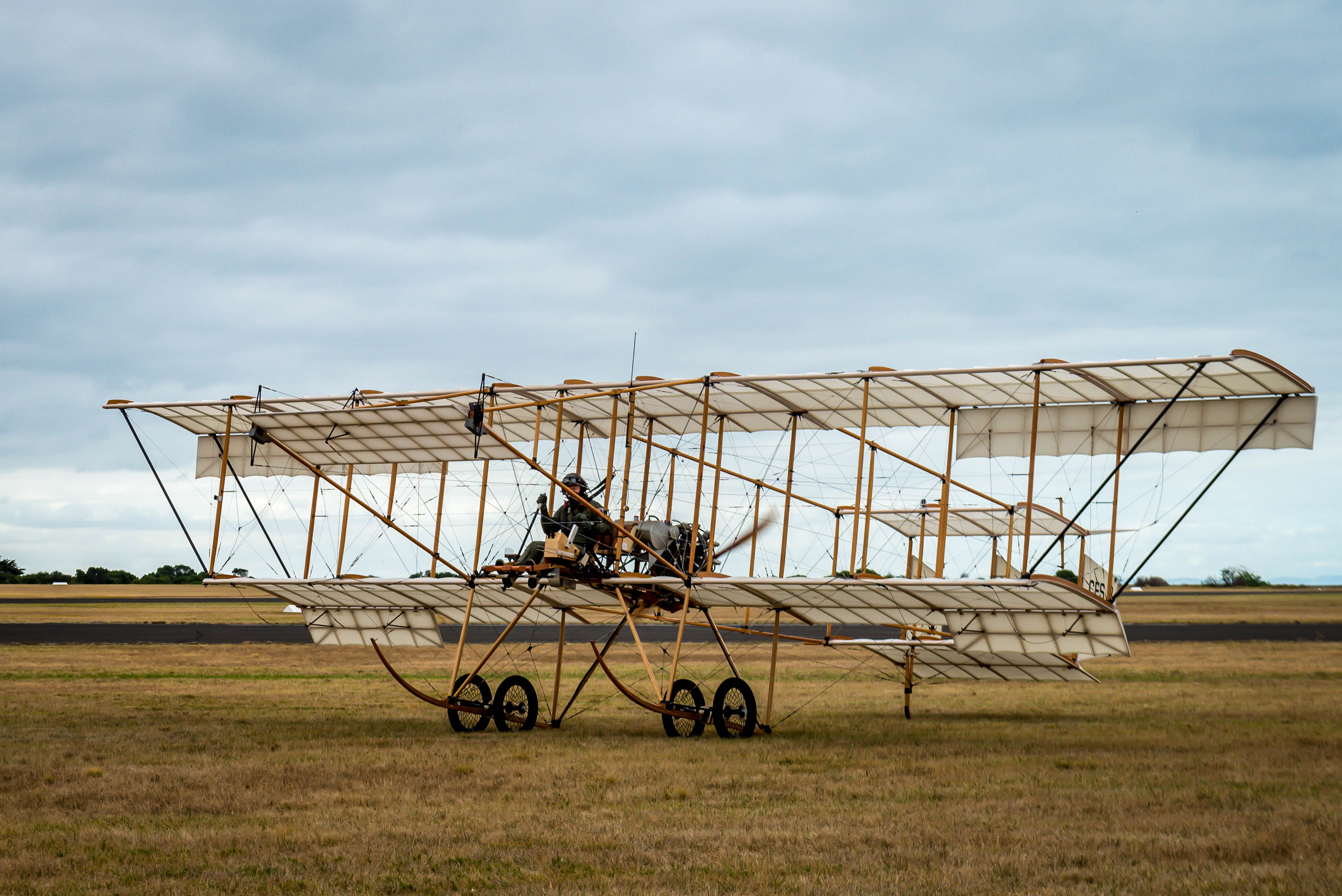
A replica Bristol Boxkite, photographed in 2014

In 1910, Biard went to the flying school run by the aviation pioneer Claude Grahame-White in Hendon, northwest London, to take lessons. According to the Liverpool Echo, his parents considered flying "a crazy, dangerous business". On his first day in Hendon, Biard bought a chequered cap in the same style as that worn by Grahame-White, and spent the remainder of the day waiting for a pilot to take him up. The following day, he tricked his way onto a Bristol Boxkite that had been warmed up for flight, took off, piloted the aircraft for a mile across the aerodrome, picked up a mechanic, and flew back safely. He later wrote that he had made the flight "more or less by French leave". Biard subsequently received formal instruction at the school, during which the instructor sat astride his aircraft's fuel tank. He gained his aviator's certificate, numbered 218, on 4 June 1912, and became an instructor at the Grahame-White school.

On 16 April 1913, Biard was commissioned as a probationary second lieutenant in the Royal Flying Corps, and was posted to its Central Flying School at Upavon on Salisbury Plain. He recounted in 1934 that, during his time at Upavon, the school's assistant commandant – the future head of the Royal Air Force, Hugh Trenchard – took him as a passenger in a test-flight of an experimental aircraft: the flight ended in a crash, from which both escaped unhurt. He resigned his commission in the RFC; this was reported in the London Gazette of 2 June 1914 as effective the following day.

I don't care to write much about the war. It was a dirty business, from the angle I remember it, sending other men's sons to death when they should have been at school. They were gallant lads, the fliers of those days. The lucky ones died with their illusions intact. The rest of us lived on. Let's leave it at that.

— Biard, writing in 1934

Biard was staying at his paternal grandfather's farm in northern France when the First World War broke out in August 1914. The farm was on a route used by refugees fleeing the fighting, and was burned by advancing German cavalry. He returned to England and to work at Grahame-White's school, where in May 1916 he piloted the Irish writer George Bernard Shaw on an acrobatic flight. (Note: Gibbs 1990, p. 211, with quotation from Biard 1934, pp. 56–57.) On 2 December 1917, Biard was commissioned into the Royal Naval Air Service; he is named in the Navy List as holding the rank of probationary flight officer, which usually denoted a newly recruited officer under training, in March 1918. (Note: Murland 2021, p. 95; Navy List April 1918. For the rank of probationary flight officer, see Abbatiello 2006, p. 43.) He is believed to have undergone training at the RNAS's flight school in Vendôme, France. He served as a flying instructor and took part in anti-submarine patrols, flying a Wright seaplane. He later described dropping bombs against a U-boat and seeing oil in the water, usually a sign of a sinking. He also fought over the Western Front, where he shot down a German Albatros aircraft. On 1 April 1918, the RNAS was merged with the RFC to form the Royal Air Force. The London Gazette reported that Biard had been entered onto the RAF's unemployed list on 22 May 1919, with the rank of second lieutenant.

== Test pilot for Supermarine ==
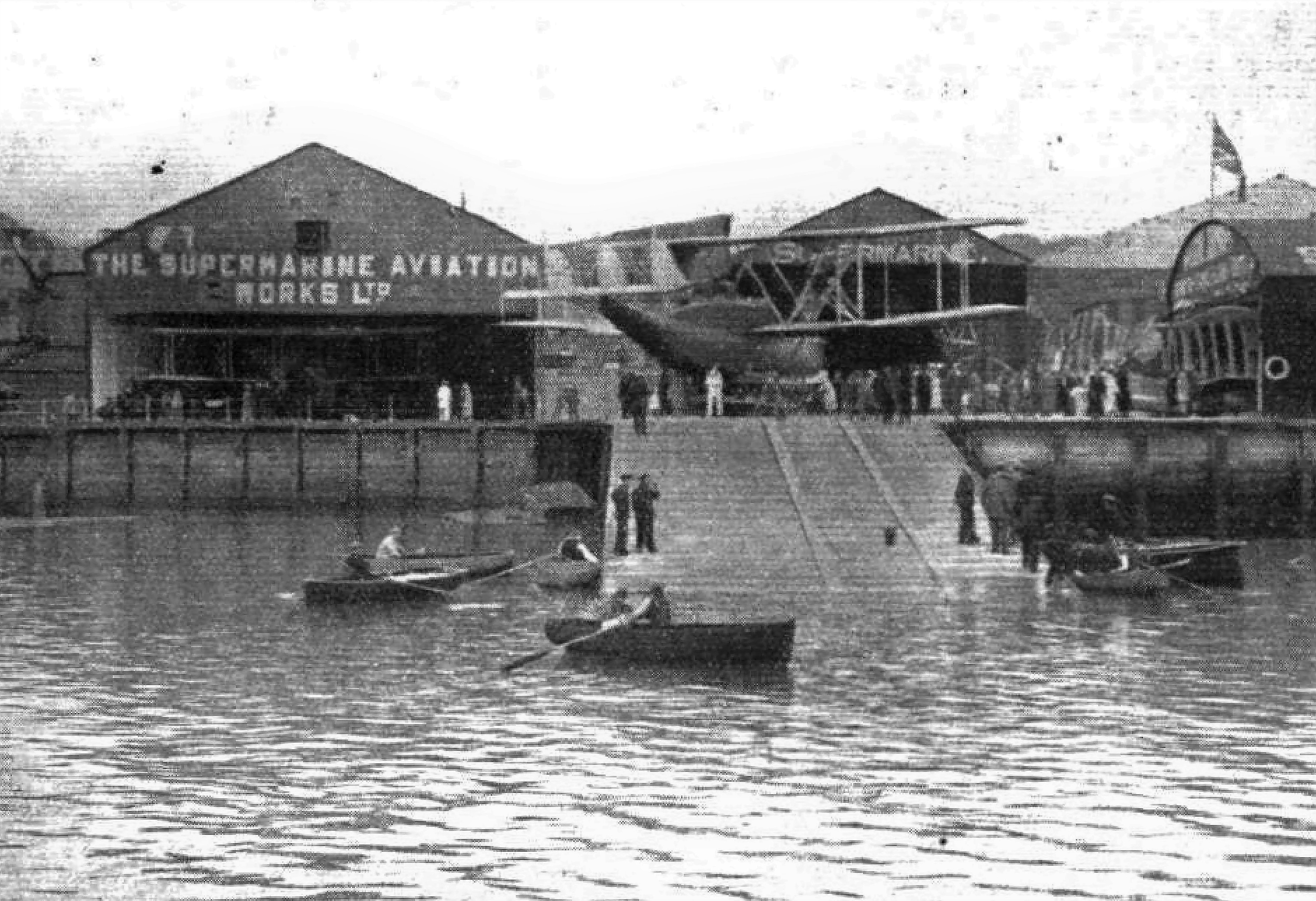
The Supermarine aviation works at Woolston, near Southampton, photographed in 1924

Upon leaving the RAF, Biard became the chief test pilot for the British aircraft manufacturer Supermarine. He was the most experienced of six pilots, all former RNAS aviators, hired by the firm's owner Hubert Scott-Paine: the others included F. J. Bailey and Basil Deacon Hobbs. Hobbs, later a decorated member of the Royal Canadian Air Force, piloted the Supermarine Sea Lion I for the 1919 Schneider Trophy, an annual speed trial for seaplanes. Biard accompanied Hobbs's team and flew spectators around the bay in one of Supermarine's flying boats for a price of three guineas (£3.3s, equivalent to £108 in 2018), described by the historian Ralph Pegram as "a huge sum at the time". The race was ultimately declared void amidst poor visibility due to fog and confusion among organisers and pilots. In March 1921, Biard flew a delegation of Japanese military and civil officials out above the English Channel in a Channel II aircraft, despite poor weather: the aircraft's good performance in these conditions led Japan to purchase three. When there was no flying to be done, Biard was tasked with other jobs around the Supermarine works: he was once introduced to a set of prospective customers while shovelling coal from a lorry.

During the railway strike of 27 September–5 October 1919, Scott-Paine tasked Biard with flying a daily route in a Channel II from Supermarine's headquarters at Woolston in Hampshire to Le Havre in Normandy, replacing the steam-powered ships that normally sailed from Southampton and whose crews had struck in solidarity with the railway workers. Biard was to fly each day in all weathers, usually alongside another Supermarine pilot. On the return journey from his first crossing, Biard ran out of fuel, having waited in the air around half an hour for his colleague, Hobbs, to take off, and was forced to land at Bembridge on the Isle of Wight: Hobbs did not notice Biard's absence until he himself landed at Woolston. An aerial search was launched to find Biard, who managed to find petrol and return safely. The flights carried passengers for a fare of £12.10s (equivalent to £496 in 2021), (Note: A flight on a land-based aircraft from London to Berlin in May 1922 cost, by contrast, £8 (equivalent to £317 in 2021).) and occasionally mail. During an impromptu race against Biard on a return flight from Le Havre, for which neither pilot had any passengers, his colleague Bailey crashed near the Isle of Wight: Biard located the wreckage, where he was met by another aircraft carrying Bailey as a passenger. Having been picked up by a fishing boat and taken to Southampton, Bailey had undertaken to be flown back to the crash site to prove that he had survived.

While at Supermarine, Biard became close friends with R. J. Mitchell, who became its chief designer in the same year as Biard joined. (Note: Cross 2021, chapter 8. For Mitchell's early career at Supermarine, see Shelton 2023, chapter 3.) Biard's reports on the performance of Mitchell's designs were an important influence on the development of several of them. Biard flew passenger services to the Channel Islands, which may have included the first commercial flight to them. He was certainly the pilot of the first commercial flights to Guernsey, which commenced in August 1923 under the auspices of British Marine Air Navigation Co Ltd, a short-lived collaboration between Supermarine and Southern Railway from August until November 1923. (Note: Marr 1982, p. 242. For British Marine Air Navigation Co Ltd, see Higham 2017, chapter 2.) Biard made these flights in a Supermarine Sea Eagle, initially landing in L'Ancresse Bay; later services would fly to the island's capital, Saint Peter Port.

Biard's colleague at Supermarine, Harry Griffiths, described him in 2006 as "what would now be termed a 'character'"; Hubert Broad, alongside whom Biard was due to fly the 1925 Schneider Trophy, called him "fey". Biard made a practice of shooting cormorants with a shotgun on the water around Supermarine's Hythe factory, often while riding as a passenger in a seaplane. In an anecdote related by Griffiths, Biard brought a snake hidden in a box to a dinner of the Supermarine design staff, and released the animal partway through the proceedings: the snake bit Biard, and caused a commotion in which a visiting director of the Aeronautical Inspection Directorate cracked his prosthetic leg.

=== 1922 Schneider Trophy victory ===
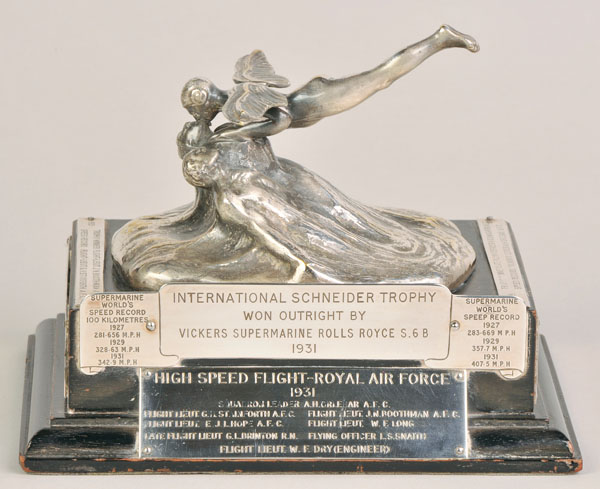
The Schneider Trophy

By 1920, the Schneider Trophy was considered, in the words of the historian Terry Gwynn-Jones, "the world's most fabled air race". (Note: Quoted in Kinney 2017, p. 157.) It had also become the only remaining international aviation race in 1920, after the French pilot Joseph Sadi-Lecointe had secured his country's third consecutive victory in the Gordon Bennett race, allowing France to retain the trophy and ending the competition. The Schneider Trophy was won by Italy in both 1920 and 1921; three consecutive wins would have allowed them to retain the trophy in perpetuity in the same fashion.

In previous iterations of the event, competing aircraft had been required to carry a payload to simulate the armament of a military aircraft; this rule was removed in 1922, allowing the construction of more specialised racing machines. Supermarine decided to construct a racing aircraft, the Sea Lion II, specifically for the event. This project was initiated towards the middle of 1921 by R. J. Mitchell at the behest of James Bird, a former naval aviator turned Supermarine director. The prototype aircraft was constructed secretly through the winter of 1921–22 in a hangar at the back of Supermarine's works; Biard, who was to fly the aircraft, was not told of its existence until early July 1922, when he agreed to be the pilot for the race. (Note: Eves 2001, pp. 81, 83. For Bird's earlier career, see Quill 2022, p. 144; for Biard's agreement to fly, see Andrews & Morgan 1981, pp. 60–61.) The race had originally been scheduled for 26 August, but in mid-July the Italian Aero Club d'Italia – who were hosting the race as the winners of the previous year – announced, possibly under governmental pressure, that it would be moved forward to 12 August.

In contrast to its later stature after 1927, when the British entry to the race was co-ordinated by the Air Ministry and the event became one of the most popular sporting events in the country, British participation in the Schneider Trophy in the early 1920s received no government funding and was entirely organised by aircraft manufacturers. A substantial entry fee was charged to ensure that only serious contenders put themselves forward. In order to raise the necessary funds, Supermarine entered a partnership with D. Napier and Son, who made the Sea Lion II's engine. This contrasted with their French and Italian rivals, whose teams were sponsored by the state; the Italian team was organised by Italo Balbo, the Blackshirt leader and future marshal of the Italian Air Force. Scott-Paine intended his company's entry into the competition to generate publicity and additional orders for its aircraft, and to reverse the trend by which Supermarine – which specialised in flying boats – had gained few government orders compared with its British rivals.

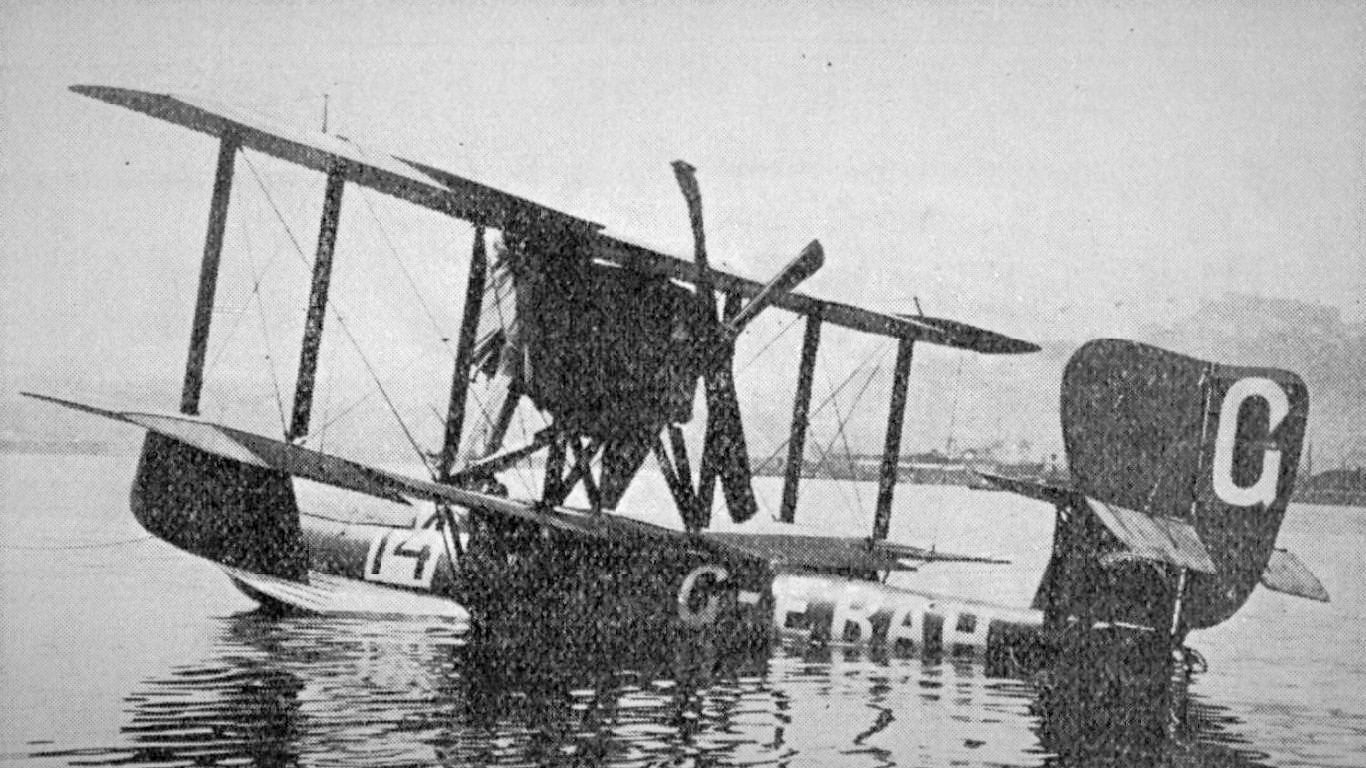
The Sea Lion II, photographed on the Bay of Naples in 1922

At the time of the Italian announcement, the Sea Lion II – which was given the number N.157 – had not yet been air-tested: in its first test flight, Biard's engine cut out due to an air lock, and he was forced to make an emergency landing. Modifications to the fuel system were made, followed by further test flights over the succeeding days and further modifications to improve the aircraft's speed and handling. On his second flight, Biard reported reaching almost 150 mph (240 km/h), then the fastest speed ever recorded in a flying boat. While the French entry was forced to withdraw, citing their inability to bring their aircraft to Naples in time for the revised date, the Supermarine team were delivered by what the competition's historian Edward Eves calls a "patriotic" coming-together of various British firms: the General Steam Navigation Company, whose management included friends of Scott-Paine, redirected their SS Philomel to transport the crew and aircraft, while Castrol, directed by its founder Charles Cheers Wakefield, donated the team's oil and provided additional money towards its undertakings.

The course consisted of thirteen laps, each of 28.521 km (17.722 mi), of a course around the Bay of Naples. Turning points were marked by balloons. In his practice flights, which were widely advertised to the Italian aviators, Biard flew slowly and with what the aviation historian Jonathan Glancey describes as a "deliberate insouciance", aiming to create a false sense of security in his rivals. During one test flight, over Mount Vesuvius, Biard was unexpectedly lifted 2,000 ft (610 m) on a thermal, but the aircraft's unusually good manoeuvrability allowed him to escape without incident. The Savoia S.51, which was to be flown by the Italian pilot Alessandro Passaleva, failed the mandatory flotation test held on 10 August (by which all aircraft were required to remain afloat at anchor for six hours, without needing to be bailed out): under the rules, it should have been disqualified from the race, but Scott-Paine considered it unsporting to lodge a protest to that effect, and so Passaleva was allowed to compete. During the navigability trials of 11 August, which all aircraft passed, Biard continued his strategy of disguising his aircraft's capabilities by flying slowly and making unnecessarily wide turns. Passaleva suffered from vibration caused by his propeller, which was beginning to delaminate after being immersed in water the previous day. The competition rules, however, forbade him from changing it.

Map of the course of the 1922 Schneider Trophy air race around the Gulf of Naples

The event, like most major sporting competitions in Italy, was held in the afternoon, starting at 4pm. Conditions were calm and warm; Biard flew in a shirt and flannel trousers, following his usual habit of eschewing a flight suit. Pilots drew lots to determine the order in which they would fly. Biard was allocated the first lap, which he completed in a time of 7 minutes and 10 seconds – the fastest lap time of any competitor in the race, representing an average speed of 149 mph (240 km/h) and reaching a maximum of over 160 mph (260 km/h). (Note: Some accounts of the race hold that the aircraft took off across the line; however, Eves considers that Biard could not have made the first lap his fastest if this were so, and so that the aircraft must already have been airborne when the timing began.) The second to depart was Piero Corgnolino, flying a Macchi M.7bis; Arturo Zanetti departed third, flying relatively slowly with a first lap time of 7 minutes 31.7 seconds owing to concerns as to his machine's airworthiness. Biard flew fastest for the first seven laps, gradually dropping to a lap time of 7 minutes 29.3 seconds for the final lap. He won in a total time of 1 hour, 34 minutes and 51.6 seconds, flying at an average speed of 145.7 mph (234.5 km/h) and beating Passaleva by two minutes and 2.5 mph (4.0 km/h). Biard flew two additional laps of the course, as he had previously arranged with the race's timekeepers, to take his total distance to 400 km (250 mi) and so to set speed records for all of the 100 km (62 mi), 200 km and 400 km distances. (Note: In January 1923, the Fédération Aéronautique Internationale, the world governing body for aerial sports, recognised his records as 200 km in 57 minutes 37.4 seconds at 129.4 mph (208.2 km/h), and 100 km in 28 minutes 41.4 seconds at 130 mph (210 km/h).)

Eves suggests that Biard's faster flying over the first seven laps, which represented a distance of 200 km, was similarly intended to ensure that he broke the record for that distance. Biard's own account of the race, in his autobiography, has been described by Pegram as "a work of pure fiction". According to Biard's account, the three Italian pilots had worked together to require him to gain height in order to overtake them. This version of events is inconsistent with the distances between the aircraft during the race: owing to his earlier start, Biard remained several miles behind Passaleva throughout the race and overtook the other pilots only once; Zanetti on Biard's fourth lap and Corgnolino on his sixth.

The aviation historians David Coles and Peter Sherrard credit Biard's victory to his "superb flying skills", and his success with driving the expansion of Supermarine and Mitchell's design team; in the aftermath of the victory, Mitchell hired Joseph Smith, who would eventually succeed him as chief designer after Mitchell's death in June 1937, as well as Alan Clifton, who became the firm's chief designer in the 1950s, and Arthur Shirvall, who specialised in designing floats for seaplanes, including those used on variants of the Spitfire. (Note: Coles & Sherrard 2012, p. 115. For Smith's later career at Supermarine, see Anderson 2018, p. 150; for Clifton's, see Walpole 2004, p. 25; for Shervall's, see Shelton 2023.) On 28 December 1922, Passaleva set a new seaplane world speed record, flying an S.51 at 174.08 mph (280.15 km/h). On his return from Naples, Biard was due to fly in the King's Cup, a round-Britain race, which was flown between 8–9 September, as the favourite: however, he was unable to make it back to Britain in time, and the race was won by Frank L. Barnard. Biard eventually returned to Britain to a hero's welcome.

=== Schneider Trophy 1923: Cowes ===
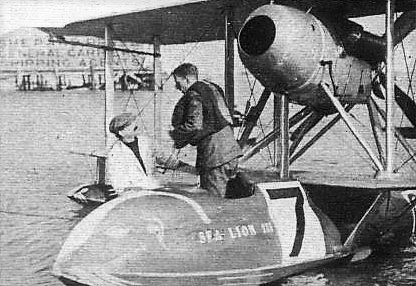
Biard aboard the Sea Lion III, photographed in Flight magazine, October 1923

Supermarine's entry was submitted only shortly before the 1923 competition, at Cowes on the Isle of Wight, was held on 28 September. The company had sold the Sea Lion II to the Air Ministry following Biard's victory the previous year, but borrowed it back and tasked Mitchell with increasing its speed by 10 kn (12 mph). Mitchell made aerodynamic improvements including shortening its wingspan from 32 to 28 ft (9.8 to 8.5 m), redesigning its floats, moving its outer struts within the structure of the aircraft and enclosing the engine in a compact, aerodynamic cowling. The new aircraft, designated the Sea Lion III, used a 550 hp (410,000 W) Napier Lion engine, 50 hp (37,000 W) more powerful than that used for the Sea Lion II, and had its nose cone painted with the face and whiskers of a sea lion. On first seeing the aircraft, Biard predicted that it was "going to be a bit playful to get off the water": (Note: Quoted in Andrews & Morgan 1981, p. 65) indeed, the aircraft tended to jump off the water before it had reached its full flying speed, possibly due to its higher take-off speed than its predecessor.

Biard was the only British competitor in the race. Initially, Sopwith had entered the Sopwith Schneider, an aircraft originally intended to compete in the cancelled 1919 edition of the race, subsequently rebuilt (as the Sopwith Rainbow) into a landplane, and re-modified in 1922 into a seaplane. However, the Schneider's propeller spinner fell off during a test flight, forcing the pilot, Walter Longton, to land it on a golf course, where it overturned and was too badly damaged to enter the race. (Note: Eves 2001, p. 95. For the Sopwith Schneider/Rainbow, see Jackson & Jackson 1988, p. 310.) The other British entry was from Reginald Kenworthy, the chief test pilot for the Leeds-based Blackburn Aeroplane and Motor Company: Kenworthy was forced to withdraw after three aborted test flights: the aircraft capsized in the first, and overheated its engine in the second. On his third test flight, during navigability trials on 27 September, Kenworthy crashed into the water, spent almost a minute underwater and lost consciousness when pulled onto a rescue boat; his life was saved by his wife, who gave him artificial respiration. His aircraft – the Blackburn Pellet – was subsequently nicknamed the "Plummet".

The course, around the Solent, was five laps each of 42.8 miles (68.9 km). The race began at 11am in calm conditions, with a slight breeze from the west. By agreement, the two American pilots – lieutenants David Rittenhouse and Rutledge Irvine of the United States Navy, flying Curtiss CR-3 aircraft – took off first. Biard followed, and was almost disqualified as his aircraft bounced on chop on the sea surface, crossing the start line in the air, against the rule that aircraft could take off only after crossing it. The race committee initially announced his disqualification, but Supermarine's director James Bird lodged a protest and Sefton Brancker, the chair of the Royal Aero Club's racing committee, had the decision overturned. (Note: Eves 2001, p. 100; Shelton 2023. For Brancker's position with the Royal Aero Club, see Blake 2023.) Biard completed his first lap in 17 minutes 11.2 seconds, representing an average speed of 149.5 mph (240.6 km/h), against 15 minutes 27.6 seconds from Irvine. On the fifth and final lap, Rittenhouse flew at an average of 181.1 mph (291.5 km/h) to finish in 14 minutes and 11 seconds, his fastest time of the race; Biard similarly flew his fastest lap at 160.8 mph (258.8 km/h) in 15 minutes 59 seconds. Overall, he flew at an average of 157.17 mph (252.94 km/h), 12 mph (19 km/h) faster than his winning speed the previous year, and finished third, twenty minutes behind the two Americans. Rittenhouse won the race at a speed of 177 mph (285 km/h), followed by Irvine at an average speed of 173.46 mph (279.16 km/h).

Biard flew the Sea Lion III to the Isle of Grain air station at RAF Kingsnorth, probably in 1924, to return it to the Air Ministry. It was then taken to the Marine Aircraft Experimental Establishment at Felixstowe. The aircraft was destroyed on 5 July of that year, when its pilot, Flying Officer E. E. Paull-Smith, attempted to take off without applying full throttle; this caused the aircraft to make one of its characteristic "bounces", rising 40 ft (12 m) into the air before crashing into the sea, killing Paull-Smith.

=== Schneider Trophy 1925: Baltimore ===
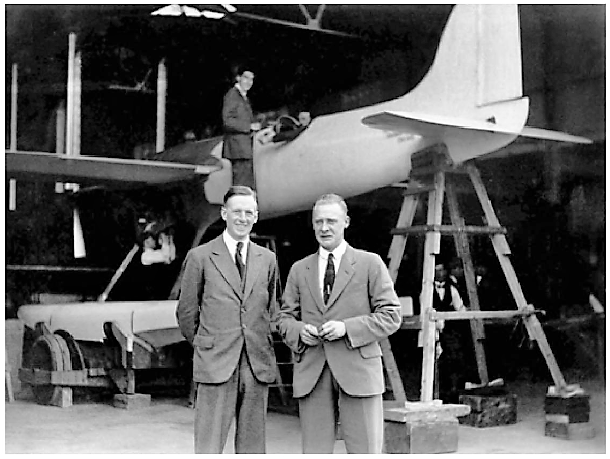
Biard (left) and R. J. Mitchell (right) in front of the Supermarine S4

The 1925 Schneider Trophy race was held on 24 October in Baltimore, (Note: The 1924 event, due to be held in the United States, was cancelled.) with a course over Chesapeake Bay. Biard was due to fly the Supermarine S4, an aircraft designed by Mitchell and built in collaboration with Napier Lion and the Air Ministry. Biard had been the pilot for the S4's first flight, which took place on 24 August. The S4 used a monoplane design against the biplane configuration most common in contemporary seaplanes: no major international race had been won in a monoplane since the French aviator Maurice Prévost had won the Gordon Bennett Trophy in a Deperdussin Monocoque in 1913. (Note: Glancey 2020, p. 57. For Prévost's victory, see Murland 2021, p. 33 and Edwards 2009, pp. 85–86) According to the historian Constance Babington Smith, Biard was "frankly awestruck" by the elegance of the Supermarine S4, and its contrast with what she calls "the galumphing flying-boats of the era, with their clutter of struts and wires". Eves, by contrast, writes that Biard "heartily disliked" the limited visibility afforded by the aircraft and was, like most pilots of his era, unfamiliar with flying monoplanes. On 13 September, on a three-mile course at Calshot in Hampshire, Biard set a world seaplane speed record, flying at 226.75 mph (364.92 km/h).

During the crossing from England, aboard SS Minnewaska, Biard broke his wrist playing tennis on the deck; after arriving in the United States, he caught influenza for the first time in his life. Facilities to store the visiting aircraft had yet to be completed, which delayed the unloading of the S4 from the Minnewaska: eventually, a large tent was erected to serve as a makeshift hangar, and the aircraft was damaged when one of the tent-poles fell on its tail in bad weather. The captain of the British team, Charles B. Wilson, suggested to Biard that he withdraw in favour of the reserve pilot, Bert Hinkler, but Biard refused.

On 25 October, the day before the race was due to be held, Biard stalled at approximately 800 ft (240 m) during a navigability trial. Observers saw him make a steep right-hand bank at high speed, which suddenly changed into a steep left-hand bank; the aircraft then began to stall and yaw, eventually entering a deep stall and making a precipitous fall from approximately 100 ft (30 m). Biard was able to bring the aircraft to a landing on the water, narrowly missing the nearby RMS Majestic, but its undercarriage collapsed from the impact. Mitchell had positioned himself on a speedboat – owned by Louis Mountbatten, the future Viceroy of India – and put on his swimming trunks underneath his suit in preparation for a possible rescue, but the boat broke down. Broad, who had taken off for his own trial before Biard, landed and taxied over to Biard, finding him conscious and floating on the water, and held onto him until the rescue boat arrived, almost an hour after the crash. Various accounts report that Mitchell's first words to Biard were to sardonically ask whether the water was warm enough for him. Biard withdrew to the team's base at the Southern Hotel, with concussion and having broken two ribs and rebroken his wrist: he played no part in the following day's race. The United States Army's James H. "Jimmy" Doolittle, who would later be awarded the Medal of Honor for his 1942 raid on Japan, won the race, maintaining an average speed of 232 mph (373 km/h). The following day, Doolittle set a new world record on a straight course, flying at 245 mph (394 km/h).

Biard blamed the crash on wing flutter, with which Broad concurred; this assessment was factored into Mitchell's design of the later S6, which was fitted with wing stiffeners. Later experiments using a scale model in a wind tunnel were generally inconclusive, but suggested that airflow over the wings may have interfered with the aircraft's elevators and tailplanes, causing aileron flutter. The historian Derek James has suggested that the accident may have been caused by aileron reversal, which can itself be caused by flutter, or by the failure of a wing flap and aileron interconnection system. (Note: Cited in Matthews 2001, p. 171, note 9) Glancey has also suggested that poor visibility – the aircraft's engine obscured much of its pilot's field of view – may have contributed to the crash; it has also been suggested that the flutter may have been caused by the aircraft's ailerons being too large, or that Biard might have stalled by misjudging a turn.

Britain made no entry into the 1926 Schneider Trophy, after a meeting of the Air Ministry, the Royal Aero Club and the Society of British Aircraft Constructors took the view that Britain would not be able to produce a race-winning aircraft in time. From the 1927 competition onwards, the training and selection of pilots was conducted by the RAF, which formed its High Speed Flight on 1 October 1926 for the purpose. (Note: "Flight", in this context, refers to a small unit, typically of around four to six aircraft.) Britain retained the trophy and ended the competition after its third consecutive win – by John Boothman, who flew with no foreign opponents – in 1931. Had he flown in 1925, Biard would have been the only pilot ever to appear three times in the race.

=== Other work for Supermarine ===
Biard tested the Supermarine Swan on its first flight on 25 March 1924. On 10 March 1925, he made the first flight of the Supermarine Southampton, in an aircraft numbered N9896, at Woolston. The aircraft's wing-tip float was damaged during the flight, leading to the adjustment of its angle of incidence and subsequent total redevelopment. The Southampton was subsequently adopted by the RAF, as well as by Argentina, Turkey and Australia, and was credited as "a new standard for marine aircraft" by the aviation historians C. F. Andrews and E. B. Morgan. Other aircraft he tested included the Seamew, the Seagull and the Scarab, a militarised version of the Sea Eagle designed for the Spanish Navy. He met the future Edward VIII, then Prince of Wales, on 27 July, during the prince's tour of the Supermarine works. On 12 August 1924, Biard flew in the King's Cup, in a Seagull, with F. J. Bailey as his navigator. Biard and Bailey were forced to withdraw from the race when, flying over Newcastle at around 3,000 ft (910 m), a blade of the propeller broke off, striking Biard and briefly rendering him unconscious.

Biard made the first flight of the Sparrow, Supermarine's first attempt at designing a landplane, on 11 September 1924. During his early test flights, Ernest Mansbridge, a designer for Supermarine, sat in the aircraft's second seat with an alarm clock to measure the aircraft's rate of climb, as well as bags of sand to be thrown out in order to adjust its weight. Biard characterised the Sparrow as being "as impudent as its name implied". During a demonstration flight, watched by Mitchell and Supermarine's directors, the aircraft's engine failed in mid-air; Biard made an emergency landing, crashing through a hedge, from which he escaped unhurt. The aircraft had been designed for the Royal Aero Club's Two-Seater Light Aeroplane Competition, held at Lympne in Kent during late September and early October 1924, which carried a prize of £2,000 (equivalent to £105,127 in 2025). The Air Ministry criticised the Sparrow's design, particularly that of its landing gear and controls, as lacking attention to detail and as limiting the pilot's view from the cockpit; the aircraft was subsequently eliminated from the Lympne trial when a connecting rod in its engine failed: the engine which was fitted to replace it initially failed to start, then seized in mid-air, forcing Biard to make another emergency landing. Biard did, however, race the aircraft on 14 October at Lympne for the Grosvenor Cup; he placed fourth with an average speed of 62.08 mph (99.91 km/h).

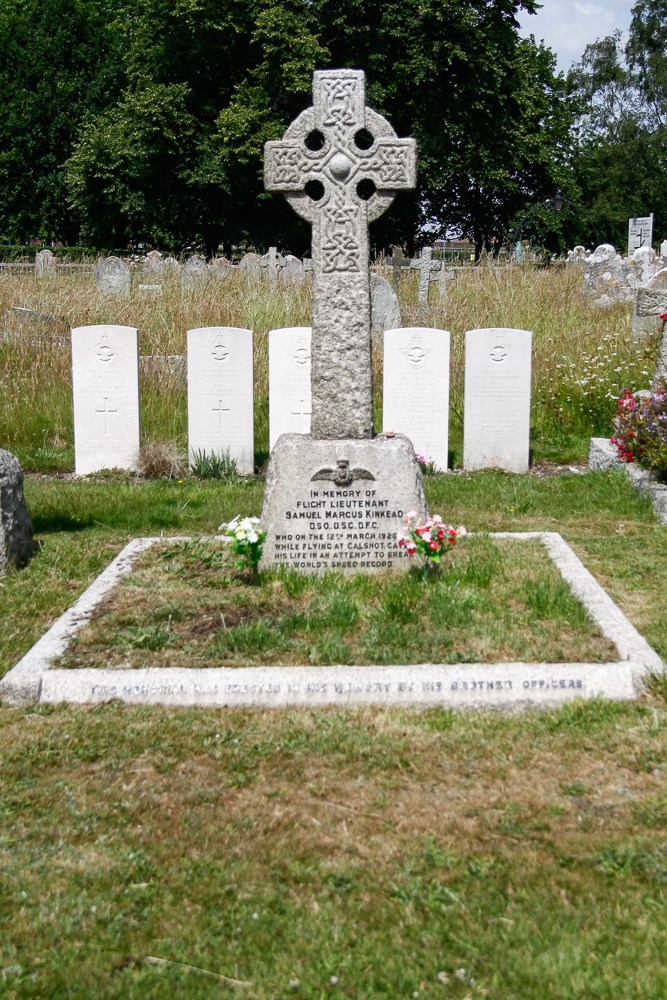
Grave of Samuel Kinkead at All Saints' Church, Fawley

Supermarine rebuilt the Sparrow, now designated the Sparrow II, with a 32 hp (24,000 W) Bristol Cherub III engine for the 1926 competition. (Note: The 1926 competition was for aircraft with an engine weight under 176 pounds (80 kg) that could fly with the greatest load-to-fuel ratio carried over courses that totalled 2,000 miles (3,200 km).) The aircraft, 130 pounds (59 kg) heavier and 7 miles per hour (11 km/h) slower than the Sparrow I, was forced to land in poor weather before passing the start line for the race on 12 September: Biard had noticed that its rivets were becoming loose and that the wings were in danger of falling off. On 12 March 1928, he witnessed, along with Mitchell, the death of his close friend Samuel Kinkead, an ace and former RNAS pilot, while attempting to set a speed record in the Supermarine S5. Biard was subsequently quoted as blaming the crash on structural failure of the aircraft.

In November 1928, Supermarine was acquired by its rival firm Vickers (Aviation) Ltd. In mid-1930, Biard was demoted, and it was decided that future Supermarine aircraft would be test-flown by Vickers pilots only. Pegram has suggested that Biard's demotion may have been a result of the new management's hostility to his well-known irreverent attitude and propensity for practical jokes. Biard later attributed his disfavour to his increasing age; he turned thirty-eight in 1930. The last prototype he flew was the Supermarine Air Yacht, in February 1930: his colleague Harry Griffiths reported a story that Biard refused to fully fuel the aircraft, believing that it would not be able to take off fully loaded, but rather pretended to do so by "pumping" fuel from empty barrels. The Air Yacht was purchased in 1932 by an American client, June Jewell James: she contracted Biard to fly it for her on a cruise of the Mediterranean, though he was forced to withdraw halfway through the voyage for an operation on his stomach injury from the 1925 Schneider Trophy crash. The aircraft would later crash on 25 January 1933; James broke her leg and the aircraft was scrapped. (Note: Pegram 2016, p. 111, which gives the circumstances as an engine failure on takeoff; Andrews and Morgan give it as a stall during flight and note that "accounts of the event differ considerably". For James's middle name, see Frimston 2006, p. 25.)

Biard continued to test Vickers aircraft that used Supermarine floats, and flew the Vickers Vildebeest on a tour of the Baltic in 1931. He remained a public figure; when he was hospitalised in Southampton for a sudden illness over a weekend in 1932, the story was reported in The Scotsman. He left Supermarine in 1933. (Note: Marr 1984, p. 10. In an interview with the Daily Mirror, he stated that his "services were no longer required" in 1932.)

== Later and personal life ==
Biard moved to Titchfield in Hampshire, where he ran a small shop. Unusually among test pilots in the era, he wrote an autobiography for the popular market, which he titled Wings and released in 1934. He wrote for various British newspapers, including a series of five columns, titled Learn to Fly Now, for a local Hampshire newspaper in 1934 and another series on the history of flight for London's Sunday Dispatch in the same year. In September 1936, he wrote a newspaper article arguing that it would be impossible to stop a bomber offensive in the event of a major war, and consequently that British defence spending on air defence – particularly from the Royal Navy – was misguided.

Biard moved to Guernsey and worked for the Guernsey Meteorological Service, but returned to Hendon after the outbreak of the Second World War in 1939, as a communications pilot for the RAF with the service number 70062. He spent most of his Second World War service in the RAF's Administrative and Special Duties Branch, except for a transfer to the General Duties Branch between 1 August 1940 and 17 March 1941. (Note: The London Gazette 34982, p. 6257; The London Gazette 35127, p. 1962) On 2 July 1944, he relinquished his commission on the grounds of ill health, leaving at the rank of flying officer. He co-wrote a book on aviation, Modern Air Transport, with F. S. Stuart, which was published in 1946.

In 1933, the Daily Mirror reported that Biard had two sons: Claude, then aged thirteen, and Michael, then aged six. By 1958, Biard and his wife had returned to Guernsey; he lived in later life in a bungalow near Rocquaine Bay. He died on 18 January 1966 in the village of Charminster, in Dorset. The Guernsey historian James Marr gave him the sobriquet "Rocquiane's dare-devil of the skies".

== Works cited ==
=== Period newspapers and reports ===
- "Air Ace Is Seeking His 1912 Licence". Portsmouth Evening News. 6 March 1958. p. 1 – via British Newspaper Archive.
- Alan, J.D.S. (20 March 1958). "Ordeal Under the Ocean". The Liverpool Echo. p. 12 – via British Newspaper Archive.
- "Alleged Serious Offence". Jersey Independent and Daily Telegraph. 16 May 1908 – via British Newspaper Archive.
- Biard, Henry (4 February 1934). "Taking G.B.S. for a Ride!". Sunday Dispatch. p. 5 – via British Newspaper Archive.
- Biard, Henry (11 February 1934). "England Wins the 'Flying Flirt'". Sunday Dispatch. p. 9 – via British Newspaper Archive.
- Biard, Henry (13 October 1934). "Learn to Fly Now". The Hampshire Advertiser and Southampton Times. p. 5 – via British Newspaper Archive.
- Biard, Henry (23 September 1936). "Aircraft Are No Defence". The Bradford Observer. p. 8 – via British Newspaper Archive.
- "Captain H. C. Biard". The Scotsman. 21 March 1932. p. 15 – via British Newspaper Archive.
- "The King's Cup". Portsmouth Evening News. 12 August 1924. p. 12 – via British Newspaper Archive.
- "Lieut. Kinkead Dives to His Death". The Yorkshire Post. 13 March 1928. p. 11 – via British Newspaper Archive.
- The London Gazette (PDF), vol. 28710, 15 April 1913
- The London Gazette (PDF), vol. 28836, 2 June 1914
- The London Gazette (PDF), vol. 31416, 24 June 1919
- The London Gazette (PDF), vol. 34982, 29 October 1940
- The London Gazette (PDF), vol. 35127, 4 April 1941
- The London Gazette Supplement (PDF), vol. 36612, 18 July 1944
- "Race for the King's Cup". Dundee Evening Telegraph. 7 September 1922. p. 4 – via British Newspaper Archive.
- "Schneider Pilot's Desperate Plight". The Daily Mirror. 30 November 1933. p. 3 – via British Newspaper Archive.
- The Navy List (PDF), London: HM Stationery Office, April 1918 – via National Library of Scotland

=== Printed and web sources ===
- Abbatiello, John (2006). Anti-Submarine Warfare in World War I: British Naval Aviation and the Defeat of the U-Boats. Abingdon: Routledge. ISBN 978-1-135-98954-5.
- Anderson, John D. (2018). The Grand Designers: The Evolution of the Airplane in the 20th Century. Cambridge: Cambridge University Press. doi:10.1017/9780511977565. ISBN 9780511977565.
- Andrews, C.F; Morgan, E.B. (1981). Supermarine Aircraft Since 1914. London: Putnam. ISBN 0-370-10018-2.
- Babington Smith, Constance (1961). Testing Time: A Study of Man and Machine in the Test Flying Era. London: Cassell. OCLC 4239288.
- Bertram, Barrie (2007a). "Henry (or Henri) Charles Biard: Page 1". The Channel Islands and the Great War.
- Bertram, Barrie (2007b). "Henry (or Henri) Charles Biard: Page 2". The Channel Islands and the Great War.
- Bertram, Barrie (2007c). "Henry (or Henri) Charles Biard: Page 3". The Channel Islands and the Great War.
- Bertram, Barrie (June 2008). "Temps Passé 2" (PDF). Channel Islands Great War Study Group Journal. 20: 35.
- Bertram, Barrie (12 September 2011). "Old Victorians Who Were Pioneers of the Sky". Jersey Evening Post.
- Biard, Henry (1934). Wings. London: Hurst and Blackett. OCLC 3338843.
- Blake, John (8 August 2023). "History & Origins". The Royal Aero Club of the United Kingdom.
- Bluffield, Robert (2014). Over Empires and Oceans: Pioneers, Aviators and Adventurers – Forging the International Air Routes 1918–1939. Ticehurst: Tattered Flag. ISBN 978-0-9576892-6-8.
- Coles, David; Sherrard, Peter (2012). The Four Geniuses of the Battle of Britain: Watson-Watt, Henry Royce, Sydney Camm & R.J. Mitchell. Barnsley: Pen and Sword Books. ISBN 978-1-78303-384-3 – via Google Books.
- Cross, Alasdair (2021). The Spitfire Kids: The Generation Who Built, Supported and Flew Britain's Most Beloved Fighter. London: Headline. ISBN 978-1-4722-8197-5 – via Google Books.
- Dancey, Peter G. (2017). British Aircraft Manufacturers Since 1909. Brimscombe: Fonthill Media. ISBN 978-1-78155-229-2 – via Google Books.
- Edwards, John Carver (2009). Orville's Aviators: Outstanding Alumni of the Wright Flying School, 1910–1916. Jefferson: McFarland. ISBN 978-0-7864-5303-0.
- Eves, Edward (2001). Coombs, L.F.E. (ed.). The Schneider Trophy Story. St. Paul: MBI Publishing. ISBN 978-0-7603-1118-9 – via Internet Archive.
- Frimston, Ian (April 2006). "Birth of the Spitfire". Aeroplane. Vol. 34, no. 4. No. 396. pp. 22–29. EAN 9770143724187.
- Gibbs, Anthony Matthews, ed. (1990). "Up in the Air: II". Shaw. London: Palgrave Macmillan. p. 211. doi:10.1007/978-1-349-05402-2_119. ISBN 978-1-349-05402-2.
- Glancey, Jonathan (2020). Wings Over Water: The Story of the World's Greatest Air Race and the Birth of the Spitfire. London: Atlantic Books. ISBN 978-1-7864-9420-7 – via Google Books.
- Gough, Michael (2013). The Pulitzer Air Races: American Aviation and Speed Supremacy, 1920–1925. Jefferson: McFarland. ISBN 978-0-7864-7100-3.
- Higham, Robin (2017). Britain's Imperial Air Routes 1918–1939. Brimscombe: Fonthill Media. ISBN 978-1-78155-370-1 – via Google Books.
- Hillman, Jo; Higgs, Colin (2020). Supermarine Southampton: The Flying Boat that Made R.J. Mitchell. Barnsley: Pen and Sword Books. ISBN 978-1-5267-8495-7 – via Google Books.
- Jackson, Aubrey Joseph; Jackson, Roger T. (1988). British Civil Aircraft, 1919–1972. Vol. 3. New York: Putnam. ISBN 978-0-85177-818-1.
- Jackson, Aubrey Joseph (1987). British Civil Aircraft, 1919–1972. Vol. 1. New York: Putnam. ISBN 978-0-85177-808-2.
- Kinney, J.R. (2017). Reinventing the Propeller: Aeronautical Specialty and the Triumph of the Modern Airplane. Cambridge: Cambridge University Press. ISBN 978-1-107-14286-2.
- Kinney, J.R. (2020). "Airminded Nationalism: Great Britain and the Schneider Trophy Competition". In McCluskey, Michael; Seaber, Luke (eds.). Aviation in the Literature and Culture of Interwar Britain. Cham: Palgrave MacMillan. pp. 251–272. doi:10.1007/978-3-030-60555-1_12. ISBN 978-3-030-60555-1. S2CID 229618741.
- Longyard, William H. (1994). Who's Who in Aviation History. Novato: Presidio. ISBN 978-1-85310-272-1 – via Internet Archive.
- Marr, L. James (1982). A History of the Bailiwick of Guernsey: The Islanders' Story. London and Chichester: Phillimore. ISBN 0-850-33-459-4.
- Marr, L. James (1984). Guernsey People. Bognor Regis: Phillimore. ISBN 978-0-85033-529-3.
- Matthews, Birch (2001). Race with the Wind: How Air Racing Advanced Aviation. St. Paul: MBI Publishing. ISBN 978-0-7603-0729-8.
- McKinstry, Leo (2010). Spitfire: Portrait of a Legend. London: John Murray. ISBN 978-1-84854-503-8 – via Google Books.
- Metcalf, Peter (1989). Bulldog: The Bristol Bulldog Fighter. Washington DC: Smithsonian Institution Press. ISBN 978-0-87474-648-8.
- Mitchell, Gordon (2011). R.J. Mitchell: Schooldays to Spitfire. Brimscombe: The History Press. ISBN 978-0-7524-7448-9 – via Google Books.
- Murland, Jerry (2021). The Schneider Trophy Air Races: The Development of Flight from 1909 to the Spitfire. Barnsley: Pen and Sword Books. ISBN 978-1-5267-7002-8 – via Google Books.
- Nicolaou, Stéphane (1998). Flying Boats & Seaplanes: A History from 1905. St. Paul: MBI Publishing. ISBN 978-0-7603-0621-5.
- Owen, David (2015). Dogfight: The Supermarine Spitfire and the Messerschmitt BF 109. Barnsley: Pen and Sword Books. ISBN 978-1-4738-3068-4.
- Pegram, Ralph (2016). Beyond the Spitfire: The Unseen Designs of R.J. Mitchell. Brimscombe: The History Press. ISBN 978-0-7509-6515-6.
- Philpott, Ian M. (2005). The Royal Air Force: The Trenchard Years, 1918–1929. Barnsley: Pen and Sword Books. ISBN 978-1-78340-968-6 – via Google Books.
- Quill, Jeffrey (2022) [1983]. Spitfire: A Test Pilot's Story. Manchester: Crecy. ISBN 978-1-80035-162-2.
- Roussel, Mike; Brown, Eric (2013). Spitfire's Forgotten Designer: The Career of Supermarine's Joe Smith. Cheltenham: History Press. ISBN 978-0-7524-9240-7 – via Google Books.
- Scott, James M. (2015). Target Tokyo: Jimmy Doolittle and the Raid That Avenged Pearl Harbor. New York: W.W. Norton. ISBN 978-0-393-24676-6 – via Google Books.
- Shelton, John (2023). R. J. Mitchell: To the Spitfire. Brimscombe: Fonthill Media. ISBN 978-1-78155-885-0 – via Google Books.
- Simpson, Andrew R.B. (2011). Another Life: Lawrence After Arabia. Brimscombe: The History Press. ISBN 978-0-7524-6644-6.
- Stuart, F.S.; Biard, Henry (1946). Modern Air Transport. London: J. Long Limited. OCLC 1947801.
- Walpole, Nigel (2004). Swift Justice: The Supermarine Low Level Reconnaissance Fighter. Barsley: Pen and Sword. ISBN 978-1-84415-070-0 – via Google Books.
- Winterton, Melanie (2022). The Archaeology of the Royal Flying Corps: Trench Art, Souvenirs and Lucky Mascots. Barnsley: Pen and Sword Books. ISBN 978-1-3990-9729-1 – via Google Books.
