= Supermarine Seamew =

British twin-engine amphibious aircraft

Seamew
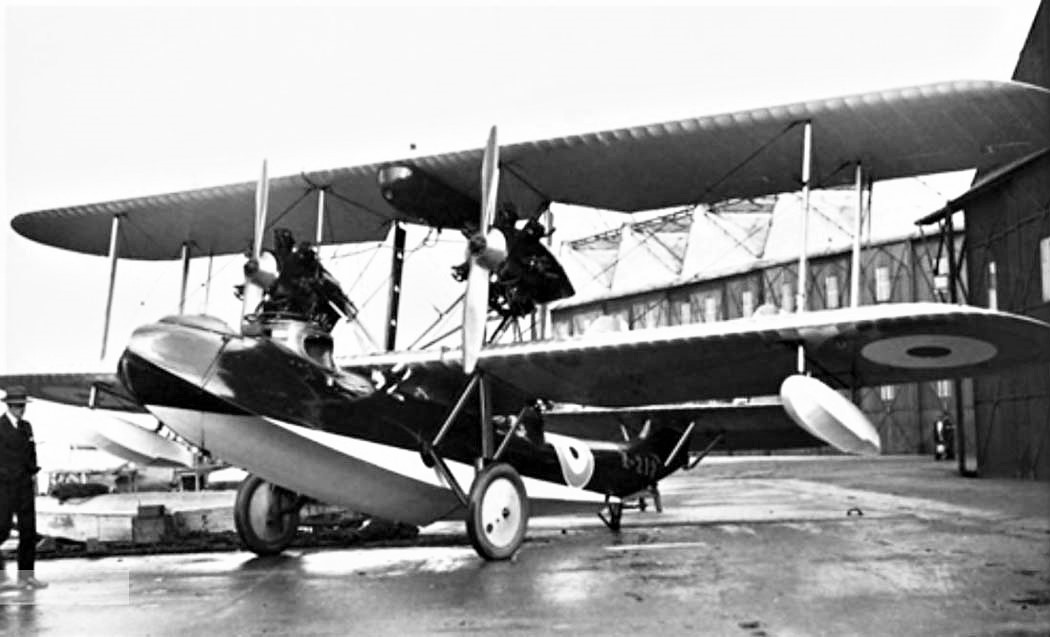

General information
- Type: Shipboard amphibious aircraft
- National origin: United Kingdom
- Manufacturer: Supermarine
- Designer: R. J. Mitchell
- Status: scrapped (in 1930)
- Number built: 2

History
- First flight: 9 January 1928

The Supermarine Seamew was a British twin engined amphibious aircraft built by Supermarine at their works in Woolston, Southampton. It was intended as a small, shipborne reconnaissance aircraft. It was designed in 1925–1927 by R. J. Mitchell to meet the Air Ministry's specification 29/24. It was the first aeroplane built by Supermarine to incorporate metal in the construction; two machines were built. Mitchell planned a civilian version of the aircraft, to accommodate up to six passengers.

Higher priority projects meant that little was done on developing the Seamew until October 1926. It first flew on 9 January 1928. Tests showed that the aircraft was nose-heavy and its hand-starter gear was faulty. The propellers were poorly positioned, so that in time they sustained damage from sea spray. Further testing revealed that fittings had been made with an unsuitable material. Both aircraft were scrapped in 1930.

== Design and development ==
In October 1924, Supermarine’s R.J. Mitchell prepared his initial drawing for a new amphibious aircraft designed for reconnaissance purposes. Mitchell designed the aircraft to have a crew of three; the pilot was located in the nose cockpit, a forward gunner was positioned behind the pilot but forward of the lower wing, and the rear gunner was aft of the lower wing. A second design, dated 5 January 1925, moved the rear gunner closer to the mainplanes and repositioned the tailskid. On the basis of Mitchell's drawings, the Air Ministry placed a contract for two aircraft to meet specification 29/24; these were given serial numbers N212 and N213, and the aircraft was given the name Seamew. In February 1926, Mitchell started to produce his final detailed drawings, during which time he redesigned the fin and rudder. He also proposed a new version of the aircraft, to accommodate up to six civilian passengers.

The design incorporated two 238 horsepower (177 kW) geared Armstrong Siddeley Lynx IV radial engines driving wooden tractor propellers. The fuel, stored in a tank mounted on the top plane, was fed by gravity to the engines. According to a 1929 article in Flight, the fuel load of 135 imperial gallons (610 L; 162 US gal) of petrol was estimated as providing the aircraft with a range of around 300 miles (480 km).

The Seamew's wings, which had a span of 46 feet (14 m), were designed to fold backwards along the hull. Mitchell designed them to have a thick high-lift aerofoil section—he selected the Göttingen 387 design—so as to enable the fully loaded Seamew to fly at low speeds without stalling. It was the first aeroplane built by Supermarine in which metal was included in the construction, as the spars were made of Duralumin, an aluminium–copper alloy. The wooden hull was effectively a scaled-down version of the Southampton, having a length of 35 feet (11 m) and a height of 13 feet 1 inch (3.99 m). The mainplanes were fabric-covered.

During 1925, Supermarine focussed on the development and construction of the Southampton, the Seagull V, and the S.4, and little was done on developing the Seamew. The following year, the Supermarine S.5, Nanok, and Sparrow II projects, as well as the need to make modifications to the Southampton, all caused further delays, so that work on the Seamew only began in October 1926. The first machine was eventually flown by Supermarine’s test pilot Henri Biard on 9 January 1928, by which time it was close to becoming obsolete.

== Testing and operational history ==
The Seamew was sent to be tested by the Marine Aircraft Experimental Establishment, the Air Ministry's facility at RAF Felixstowe. It emerged that the hand-starter gear was prone to failure, and when the aircraft was full loaded, the propellers sustained damage when they hit sea spray during take-off. As the aircraft proved to be nose-heavy, which prevented it from gaining altitude at its best climbing speed, Supermarine modified the tailplane by fitting balanced rudders. After flying for 66 hours, N212's mainplane fitting failed, a fault later discovered to have been caused by the stainless steel used for the fittings. In March 1930, Supermarine considered replacing the Seamew's engine type to increase its power, but the idea was abandoned.

On 12 April 1930, N212 crashed when taxiing on the slipway at Felixstowe. This incident, as well as the potential expense involved in making new mainplane fittings and rebuilding the airframe, led to both aircraft being scrapped that year.

The Seamew provided Mitchell with new information about aerofoil design, which was later used in the design of the Spitfire wing. N213 had been fitted with smaller propellers, but this had resulted in a loss in rate of climb. To alleviate this problem, Supermarine consequently designed the Seagull V and the Sea Otter with a single engine.

== Specifications ==
Data from Supermarine Aircraft since 1914

General characteristics

- Crew: 2–3 (pilot and 1 or 2 gunners)
- Length: 36 ft 5 5/8 in (11.116 m)
- Wingspan: 45 ft 11 1/2 in (14.008 m)
- Height: 15 ft 1 in (4.60 m)
- Wing area: 610 sq ft (57 m^{2})
- Airfoil: Goettingen 387
- Empty weight: 4,675 lb (2,121 kg)
- Gross weight: 5,800 lb (2,631 kg)
- Powerplant: 1 × Armstrong Siddeley Lynx IV 7-cylinder air-cooled radial piston engine, 238 hp (177 kW)
- Propellers: 2-bladed fixed-pitch wooden propellers, 10 ft 0 in (3.05 m) diameter

(N213, the 2nd Seamew, was fitted with 4-bladed 8 ft (2 m) diameter propellers to reduce damage by water striking the propellers).

Performance

- Maximum speed: 95 mph (153 km/h, 83 kn)
- Service ceiling: 10,950 ft (3,340 m)
- Rate of climb: 523 ft/min (2.66 m/s)

Armament

- Guns: 2 × .303 in (7.70 mm) Lewis Guns

== Sources ==
- Andrews, C. F.; Morgan, Eric B. (1981). Supermarine Aircraft since 1914. London: Putnam. ISBN 978-03701-0-018-0.
- Duval, G.R. (1966). British Flying-Boats and Amphibians 1909-1952. London: Putnam. OCLC 1463594.
- London, Peter M. (2003). British Flying Boats. Stroud, UK: Sutton Publishing. ISBN 978-0-7509-2695-9.
- Pegram, Ralph (2016). Beyond the Spitfire: The Unseen Designs of R.J. Mitchell. Pegram: The History Press. ISBN 978-0-7509-6515-6.
