= Supermarine S.4 =

British floatplane (1925)

S.4
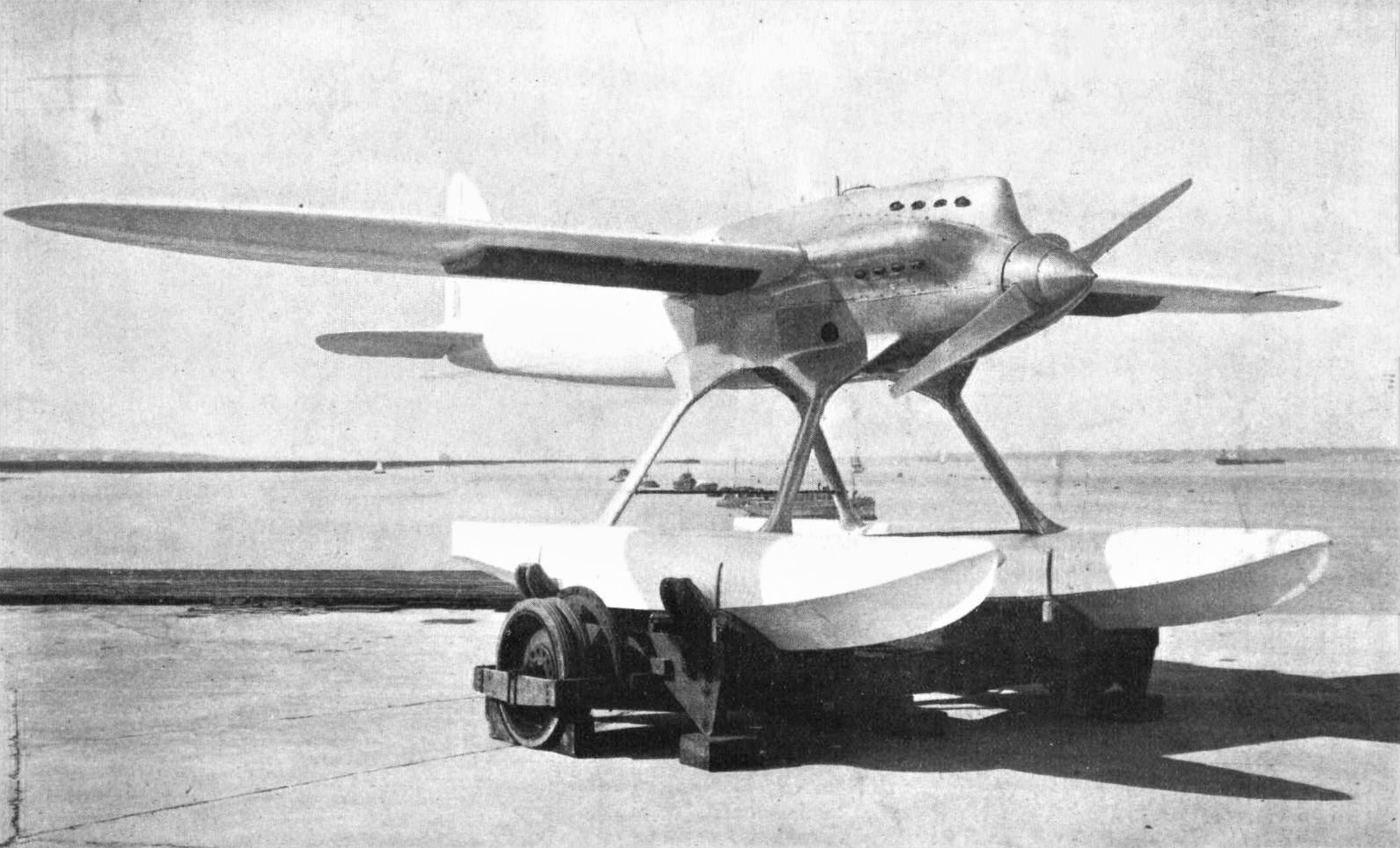
- Official photograph of the S.4, from the magazine Flight in October 1925

General information
- Type: Racing floatplane
- National origin: United Kingdom
- Manufacturer: Supermarine
- Designer: R. J. Mitchell
- Status: Destroyed 23 October 1925
- Number built: 1

History
- First flight: 24 August 1925

The Supermarine S.4 was a 1920s British single-engined monoplane built by the company Supermarine. Designed by a team led by the company's chief designer, R. J. Mitchell, it was designed to compete in the 1925 Schneider Trophy contest.

Mitchell's design is considered by aviation historians as revolutionary. Built of wood with an unbraced cantilever wing, the S.4 was powered by a Napier Lion engine developed to produce 700 horsepower (520 kW) over a short period. Less than a month after its maiden flight on 24 August 1925, it raised the world's seaplane speed record to 226.752 miles per hour (364.922 km/h).

At Bay Shore Park in Baltimore in the US, the venue of the 1925 contest and prior to the event, the S.4's rear end was damaged by a falling pole during a gale. During navigation trials on 23 October the repaired aircraft was observed to be performing well, but then, for reasons that have not been fully explained, it went out of control, and was destroyed when it dived into the sea from 100 feet (30 m), injuring the pilot, Henry Biard. Mitchell went on to use the experience he had gained working on the S.4 to design its successor, the Supermarine S.5.

== Design and development ==
During 1925, R. J. Mitchell was working on a new aircraft to compete in that year's Schneider Trophy competition. The decision to begin the design process was made jointly by Napier and Supermarine on 18 March 1925. Following the success of the Americans during the previous contest, Mitchell was fully aware of the need to reduce drag to increase speed. Supermarine's new design was for a mid-wing cantilever floatplane which resembled a French monoplane, the Bernard SIMB V.2, which had broken the flight airspeed record in December 1924. The new design was in marked contrast to the flying boats Mitchell had designed for previous Schneider Trophy races, which had won in 1922 and come third behind the American Curtiss CR seaplanes in 1923.

The designation S.4 was given by Mitchell, "S" standing for Schneider. He regarded the three previous Schneider Trophy entrants (the Supermarine Sea Lion series) as S.1, S.2, and S.3. The S.4 was the first Schneider Trophy entrant to be supported by the British government, who agreed to buy the aircraft if Supermarine and Napier covered the initial costs of development and construction. The Air Ministry provided the British teams with greater freedom than was given by the U.S. government to their designers.

The S.4 was a monoplane seaplane with an unbraced cantilever wing and semi-monocoque fuselage, powered by a specially developed version of the Napier Lion, developed to produce 700 horsepower (520 kW) over a short period. The aircraft was primarily constructed from wood: the single-piece unbraced wing had two spars with spruce flanges and plywood webs, and was covered with plywood braced by stringers. The fuselage had a covering of diagonally laid spruce planking over plywood formers constructed around a pair of steel A-frames, to which the engine bearers and wing spars were attached and which carried the floats. The single-step floats were metal. The S.4 lacked the newly designed surface radiators, at that time still unavailable, but it was aerodynamic and also judged to be aesthetically pleasing.

In September 1925, the magazine Flight reported:

Perhaps one may describe the Supermarine-Napier S.4 as having the appearance of having been designed in an inspired moment, but having all that is considered best in British construction incorporated in its details. That the design is bold, no one will deny, and we think the greatest credit is due to Mr. R. J. Mitchell, chief designer of the Supermarine Aviation Works, for his courage in breaking away from stereotyped methods and striking out on entirely novel lines.

== Operational history ==
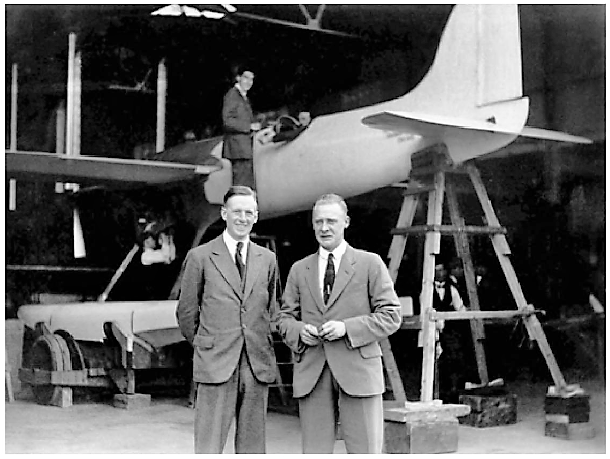
Henry Biard and R. J. Mitchell in front of the S.4

Allocated the civil registration G-EBLP and the Air Ministry serial number N197, the S.4 first flew on 24 August 1925, witnessed by Mitchell, who went out in a motorboat with Lord Mountbatten. Testing took place at Calshot, because of the long take-off runs that were required.

Supermarine's chief test pilot Henry Biard was reportedly unhappy with the S.4, disliking the unbraced wings and the cockpit position, which was well back behind the wings. The location of the cockpit was potentially hazardous, as it restricted the pilot's view ahead, particularly during take-off and landing. During its maiden flight, this issue caused the S.4 to come close to colliding with an ocean liner. (Note: The liner involved was White Star Line's Majestic, which was at the time at the entrance to Southampton Water.)

On 13 September 1925, on a 1.864-mile (3.0 km) straight course over Southampton Water, the S.4 raised the world's seaplane speed record (and the British speed record) to 226.752 miles per hour (364.922 km/h). This created a sensation in the press when it was announced a month later.

=== Schneider Trophy competition of 1925 ===
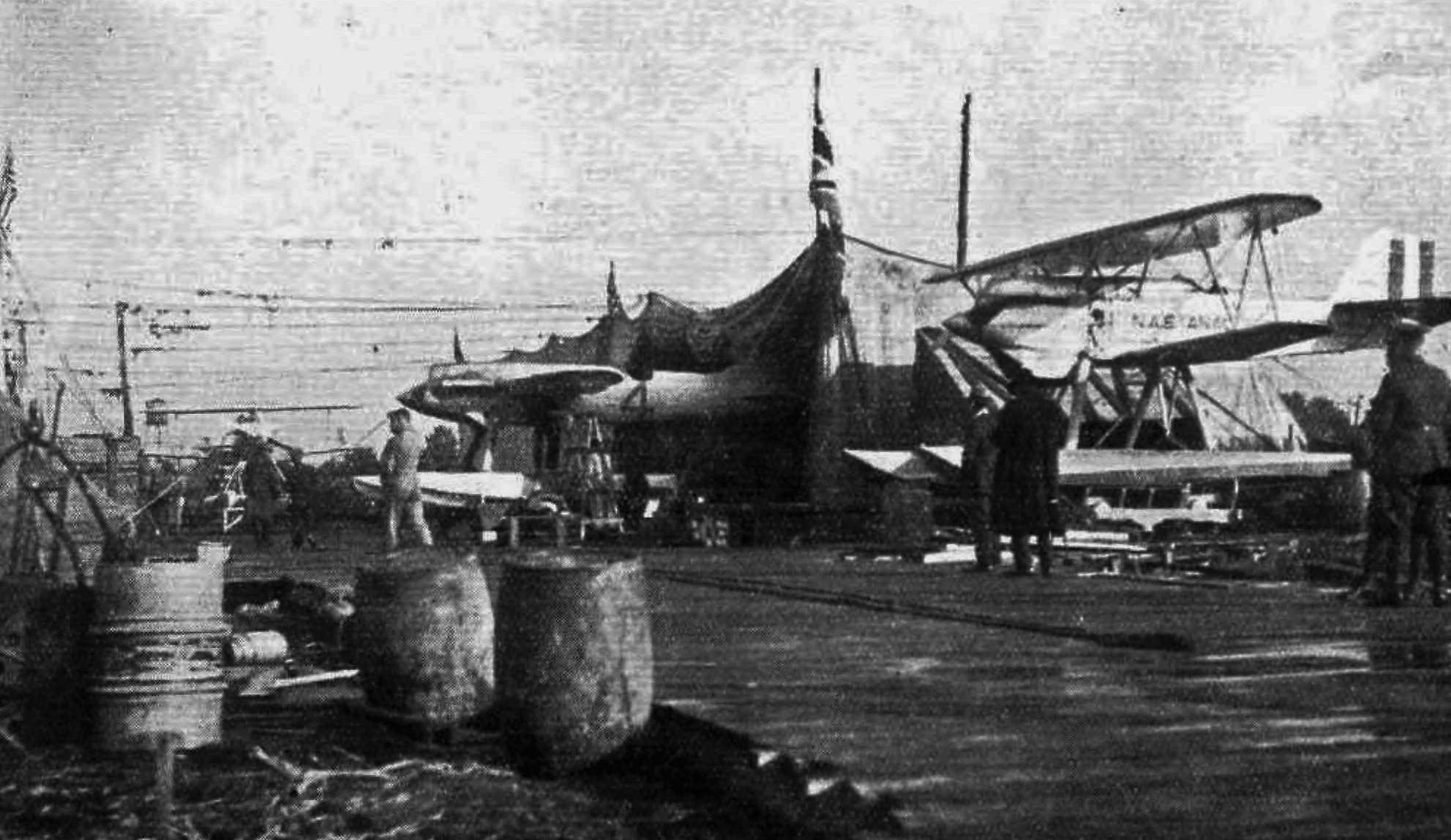
The Supermarine S.4 (left of centre) prior to the start of the 1925 Schneider Trophy competition

With high hopes of a British victory in the forthcoming Schneider Trophy competition at Bay Shore Park, Baltimore, the S.4, together with two Gloster III biplanes, was shipped to the U.S. aboard the SS Minnewaska, free of charge. During the voyage, Supermarine's pilot Biard slipped playing tennis, and injured his wrist.

Bad weather meant that those Schneider Trophy competitors that had already arrived for the competition had little opportunity to practise the course. The aircraft were forced to remain in their crates while canvas hangars were being erected on the beach to accommodate them. Biard caught influenza, but recovered sufficiently to participate in the competition. The windy conditions had, however, blown down the hangar where the S.4 was being kept, and the rear end of the aircraft had been damaged by a falling pole. The S.4 was repaired in time to take part in navigation trials on 23 October 1925.

During the trials, the S.4 initially performed well but, upon its return to shore, the control column began to oscillate violently and Biard lost control of the machine at high speed. The S.4 was seen to stall, before falling flat into the sea from 100 feet (30 m). Biard, who initially had lost consciousness when he was still strapped into the aeroplane, was able to resurface from the sea bed, and cling to some floating wreckage. The first launch sent out to him broke down with engine trouble, and he had to be rescued by a second launch. Mitchell, who was on board the boat that rescued Biard, jokingly asked the injured man: "Is the water warm?" Biard was later found to have broken two ribs.

Parts of the wrecked aircraft were salvaged by the sloop HMS Valerian, which had been dispatched to Baltimore from the Bermuda to support the British team. Most sources have suggested the accident was due to flutter, but although an enquiry was later held, the reasons for the crash were never clearly established.

=== Aftermath of the crash ===
The race was won two days later by the Americans, with Lieutenant James Doolittle, flying a Curtiss R3C at an average speed of 232.573 mph (374.443 km/h), which was faster than the S.4's world record of a month before. It was evident to the other national teams that the American approach towards the contest—which involved training for the pilots and development testing of the aircraft—was required. Mitchell was to say as much when he gave a lecture to the Royal Aeronautical Society in 1927. From 1925 onwards, the Air Ministry developed a policy of using wind tunnel tests to analyse the performance of the high-speed aircraft they produced.

== Legacy ==
Screencapture from the British film The First of the Few (1942), which included footage of the Supermarine S.4 taking off

The Supermarine S.4 was a revolutionary aircraft that was years ahead of its time, and which "set the pattern in specific aircraft design that persisted through the [1930s and 1940s]". It was designed with new technology, with floats that were the most advanced of their time, and a wing, with its lack of external bracing wires, that had never before been incorporated into a Supermarine aircraft. The aviation historian John D. Anderson notes that the aircraft "represented Mitchell's willingness to incorporate new technology within the framework of a tried and tested intellectual methodology for conceptual design", and was "a revolution in airplane design" that "influenced all subsequent Schneider racers". The winning aircraft of the 1926 Schneider contest, the Italian Macchi M.39, was distinctly similar to the S.4. Mitchell used the practical experience gained when he designed its successor, the Supermarine S.5. The S.4 has been described as "his first outstanding success".

Drawings and archival footage of the plane's construction, and five minutes of film that show the aircraft's first takeoff and flight, are preserved in Leslie Howard's biographical film about Mitchell, The First of the Few (1942).

The S.5's design included features intended to reduce the wing flutter considered at the time to have contributed to the loss of the S.4; the monoplane wings were braced with wires. The S.5 was given a smaller fuselage cross section and more streamlined floats, modifications designed to produce increases in speed over its predecessor. The greatest speed increase—considered to be approximately 24 miles per hour (39 km/h)—was produced by the introduction of surface radiators to cool the engine, as they significantly reduced the drag forces acting on the aircraft. Tests made on a model of the S.4 at the National Physics Laboratory which were done after the crash revealed that the Lamblin radiators accounted for a third of the aircraft's drag and that without them the S.4 would have been the "cleanest" monoplane in the world.

== Specifications ==
Data from Supermarine Aircraft since 1914

General characteristics

- Crew: 1
- Length: 26 ft 7 3/4 in (8.122 m)
- Wingspan: 30 ft 7.5 in (9.335 m)
- Height: 11 ft 8.75 in (3.5751 m)
- Wing area: 139 sq ft (12.9 m^{2})
- Empty weight: 2,600 lb (1,179 kg)
- Gross weight: 3,191 lb (1,447 kg)
- Powerplant: 1 × Napier Lion VII W-12 liquid-cooled piston engine, 680 hp (510 kW) at 2,000 rpm
- Propellers: 2-bladed fixed-pitch propeller

Performance

- Maximum speed: 239 mph (385 km/h, 208 kn)
- Wing loading: 23 lb/sq ft (110 kg/m^{2})
- Power/mass: 0.21 hp/lb (0.35 kW/kg)

== Sources ==
- Aldgate, Anthony & Richards, Jeffrey (1994). Britain Can Take it: British Cinema in the Second World War (2nd ed.). Edinburgh: Edinburgh University Press. ISBN 978-0-7486-0508-8.
- Anderson, John D. (2018). "Design for Speed: R. J. Mitchell and the Spitfire". The Grand Designers: The Evolution of the Airplane in the 20th Century. Cambridge Centennial of Flight. Cambridge: Cambridge University Press. pp. 116–155. doi:10.1017/9780511977565.006. ISBN 978-1-108-34056-4.
- Andrews, C. F. & Morgan, Eric B. (1981). Supermarine Aircraft since 1914. London: Putnam. ISBN 978-0-370-10018-0.
- Eves, Edward & Coombs, L. F. E (2001). The Schneider Trophy Story. St. Paul, Minnesota: MBI. ISBN 978-0-7603-1118-9.
- Glancey, Jonathan (2008). Spitfire: The Illustrated Biography. London: Atlantic Books. ISBN 978-1-84354-799-0.
- Jackson, A. J. (1973). British Civil Aircraft, 1919–1972. Vol. 3. London: Putnam. ISBN 978-0-85177-818-1.
- James, Derek N. (1981). Schneider Trophy Aircraft 1913–1931. London: Putnam. ISBN 978-0-370-30328-4.
- Lewis, Peter (1970). British Racing and Record-Breaking Aircraft. London: Putnam. ISBN 978-0-370-00067-1.
- Loftin, Laurence K. (1985). Quest for Performance: The Evolution of Modern Aircraft. Washington, DC: Scientific and Technical Information Branch, National Aeronautics and Space Administration. ISBN 978-0-16-002221-0.
- Mitchell, Gordon (2002). R.J. Mitchell: Schooldays to Spitfire. London: Tempus Publishing. ISBN 978-0-7524-3727-9.
- Ritchie, Sebastian (2004). "Mitchell, Reginald Joseph". Oxford Dictionary of National Biography (online ed.). Oxford University Press. doi:10.1093/ref:odnb/35046. OCLC 56568095. (Subscription, Wikipedia Library access or UK public library membership required.) (subscription may be required or content may be available in libraries that are in the UK)
