= All Saints' Church, Fawley =

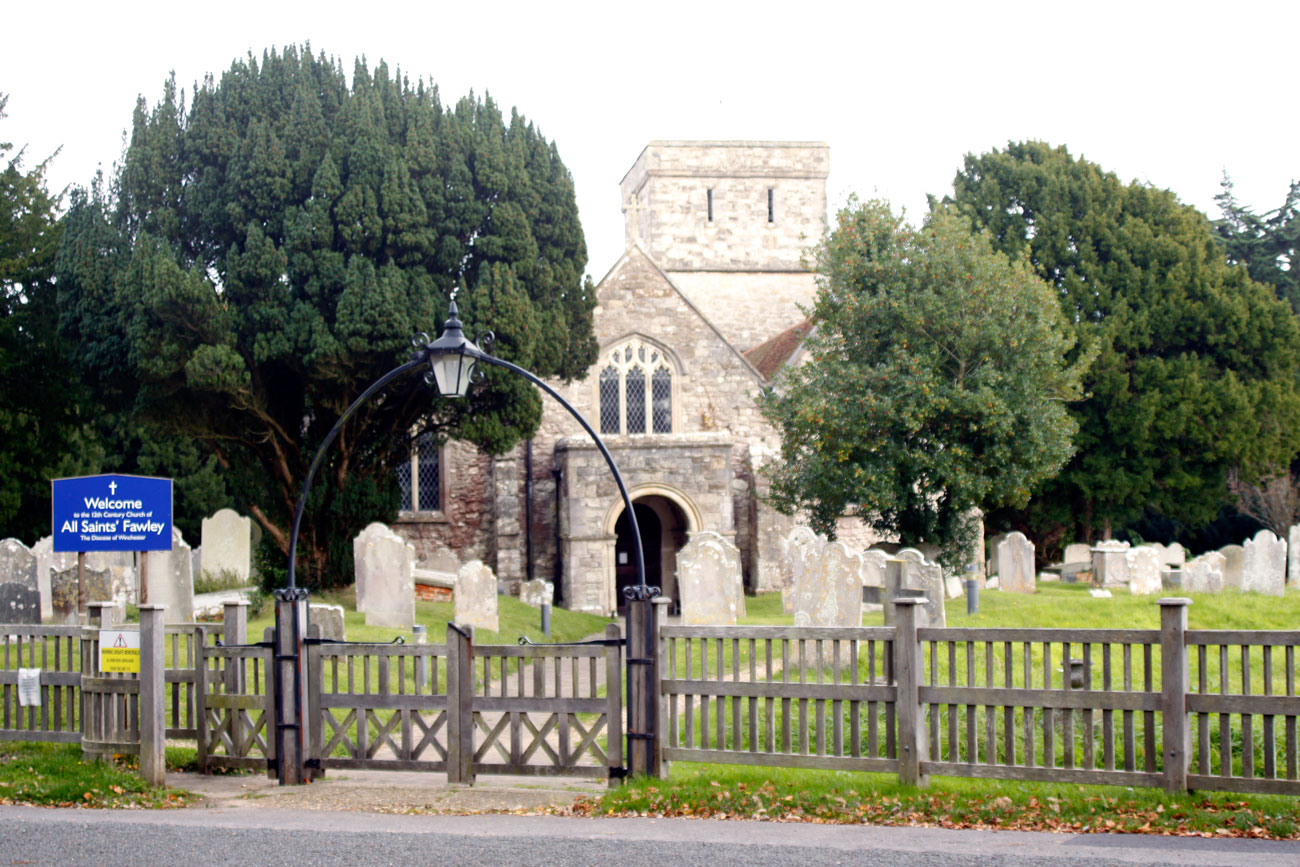
- The Parish Church of All Saints', Fawley

- Shown within Hampshire
- 50.8296986°N 1.3538568°W
- OS grid reference: SU 45754 03553
- Location: Fawley, Hampshire
- Country: England
- Denomination: Anglican
- Website: Parish of Fawley (Hampshire)

History
- Status: Parish church
- Founded: 12th century
- Dedication: All Saints

Architecture
- Functional status: Active
- Heritage designation: Listed building – Grade I
- Architectural type: Church
- Style: Norman

Specifications
- Materials: Stone with tiled roof

Administration
- Province: Canterbury
- Diocese: Winchester
- Archdeaconry: Bournemouth
- Deanery: Lyndhurst
- Parish: Fawley (Hampshire)

Clergy
- Bishop: Bishop of Southampton
- Vicar(s): Rev, Alison Bennett

All Saints' Church is the parish church for Fawley in the county of Hampshire. It is one of the three original medieval parish churches along the area to the west of Southampton Water know locally as the Waterside.

== History ==
The current building dates from the twelfth century and appears to have been built over two periods, 1170–1210 and 1300–1340. There is reference to an earlier church, likely to be on this site, dating from 971 and possibly some parts were reused in the current building

The oldest part of the church is St Nicholas's Chapel, and there is conjecture this was also the original dedication of the church. A porch was added to the west entrance in 1840.

=== Bombing in World War 2 ===
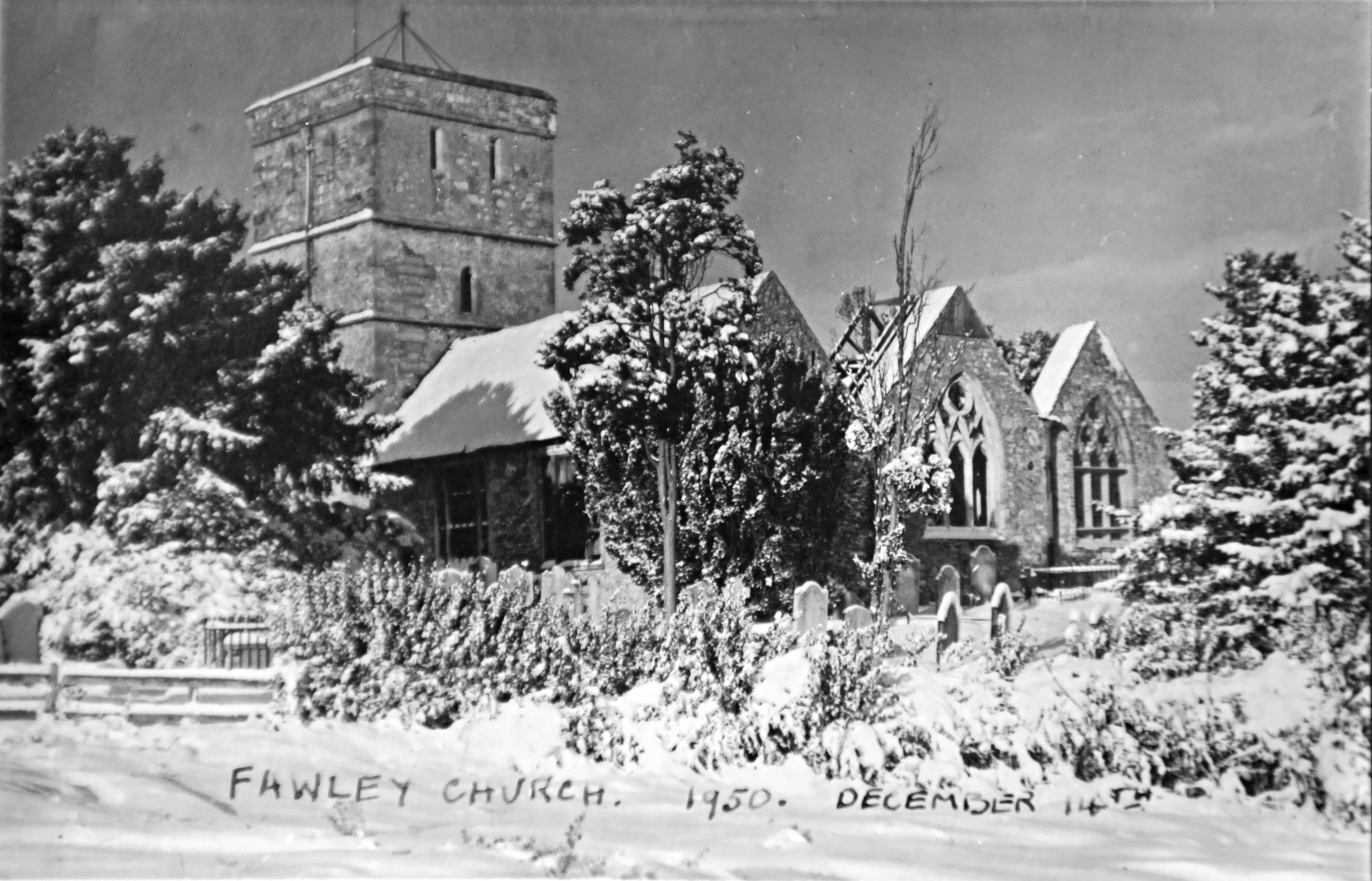
Fawley church showing bomb damage in the winter of 1950

The church was bombed in 1940 and was badly damaged losing all of its medieval stained glass. It wasn't until 1954 before the church was repaired and reconsecrated.

There is a plaque in the church dedicated to the rector who helped in the restoration and re-dedication of the church.

The plaque reads:

In memory of The Revd. John Mearing rector 1947-1960 by whose inspiration this church was restored and re-dedicated 12. September 1954 after severe damage by enemy action 23. November 1940

In the west window of St Nicholas's chapel there is a collage made from recovered stained glass.

== Tombs & Memorials ==
=== Flight Lieutenant Samuel Kinkead ===
Samuel Kinkead was a South African fighter ace from the First World War and Schneider Trophy pilot who died whilst attempting to break the airspeed record in 1928.

== Bells ==
The church now has six bells dating from 1603. The four earlier bells were rehung and augmented in 1909 with two extra trebles

Bells of All Saints' Fawley
Bell	Weight	Note	Date	Inscription	Bell Founder
Treble	4cwt. 0qtr. 26lbs.	F	1909		John Warner & Sons
2	4cwt. 2qtr. 6lbs.	E♭	1909		John Warner & Sons
3	4cwt. 3qtr. 26lbs	D♭	1867		John Warner & Sons
4	5cwt. 3qtr. 16lbs	C	1603	Give God the glory	R B (of Hants)
5	7cwt. 3qtr. 8lbs	B♭	1677		Robert (?Richard?) Florey
6	6cwt. 3qtr. 16lbs.	A♭	1737		Joshua Kipling

All weights provided by Robert Parker (Bellhanger) in August 2007, when the bells were rehung.
