= Samuel Kinkead =

South African World War I ace (1897–1928)

Samuel Kinkead DSO DSC* DFC*
- Born: 25 February 1897; Johannesburg, South African Republic
- Died: 12 March 1928 (aged 31); Calshot, England
- Alma mater: Sacred Heart College, Marist Observatory
- Military career
- Allegiance: United Kingdom
- Branch: Royal Naval Air Service; Royal Air Force
- Service years: 1915–1928
- Rank: Flight Lieutenant
- Nickname: Kink
- Conflicts: First World War; Russian Civil War
- Awards: Distinguished Service Order; Distinguished Service Cross & Bar; Distinguished Flying Cross & Bar; Mentioned in Despatches

Samuel Marcus Kinkead DSO, DSC & Bar, DFC & Bar (25 February 1897 – 12 March 1928) was a South African fighter ace with 33 victories during the First World War. He went on to serve in southern Russia and the Middle East postwar.

== Early life ==
Kinkead was born in Johannesburg, South African Republic, to an Irish father and Scottish mother who had recently emigrated there. He was the second son, with an elder brother named Thompson Calder Kinkead, born circa 1893.

Samuel Kinkead joined the Royal Naval Air Service in September 1915. He took pilot training at Eastbourne in South Africa. He earned his wings by the end of 1915.

== First World War ==
Samuel Kinkead served in 2 Wing RNAS during the Gallipoli Campaign. While flying a Bristol Scout, he shot down a Fokker on 11 August 1916. He also scored on 28 August 1916 while flying a Nieuport, and was credited with a third victory while also flying a Nieuport.

He fell ill with a serious case of malaria and was shipped home to convalesce. Upon recovery, he was forwarded to England, where his older brother Thompson was training as a pilot in the Royal Flying Corps. While on his second solo flight on 3 September 1917, Thompson died in a crash at Shoreham. Samuel signed for his deceased brother's personal effects.

Samuel Kinkead was assigned to 1 Naval Squadron to fly Nieuports on the Western Front. Exactly two weeks after his brother's death, on 17 September 1917, he drove down a DFW two-seater out of control. A month later, he repeated the feat to become an ace. He went on to claim three more triumphs in October.

In November and December 1917, he downed three planes each. In mid November, he switched 'birds' to fly a Sopwith Camel, the type of plane he would fly through war's end. Then, with his tally at 14, he went on hiatus for three months. During this time, on 22 February, he was awarded the Distinguished Service Cross (DSC).

In March, 1918, he started accumulating victories by ones and twos, finishing up May with his total at 26. Most of the time, he drove enemy craft out of the fight; he reported few destroyed. However, he received a Bar to his DSC on 26 April 1918. Then on 30 May he took another hiatus, this time for two months.

He scored on each of the last three days of July, and four times in August, bringing his total to 33. He had become the leading ace out of the 18 in his squadron, now renumbered 201 Squadron when it was folded into the newly formed Royal Air Force. On 3 August, he received the Distinguished Flying Cross (DFC). On 2 November, he was awarded a Bar to his DFC.

Out of the victories whose details are recorded, Kinkead claimed 23 enemy planes 'out of control' including three shared. He destroyed five, and shared in the destruction of two others. One aircraft was claimed captured.

== Post-war ==
Kinkead volunteered to serve with No. 47 Squadron RAF after war's end, when they were sent into Russia to intercede in the Russian Civil War. He served as B Flight Commander under Raymond Collishaw. The squadron operated from an equipped train. It was while supporting General Denikin's Royalists that, on 12 October 1919, he won the Distinguished Service Order for a crucial ground attack against a Bolshevik cavalry division near Kotluban, thus saving the city of Tsaritsyn from capture. He also shot down three Russian fighters during this campaign: on 30 September 1919, at Chernyi Yar; on 7 October, at Dubovka; and on 18 October at Peskovatka.

He was a member of the British 1927 Schneider Trophy team, retiring in the Gloster IV after five laps. His third lap speed of 277.18 mph was the fastest biplane seaplane flight ever recorded.

== Death ==
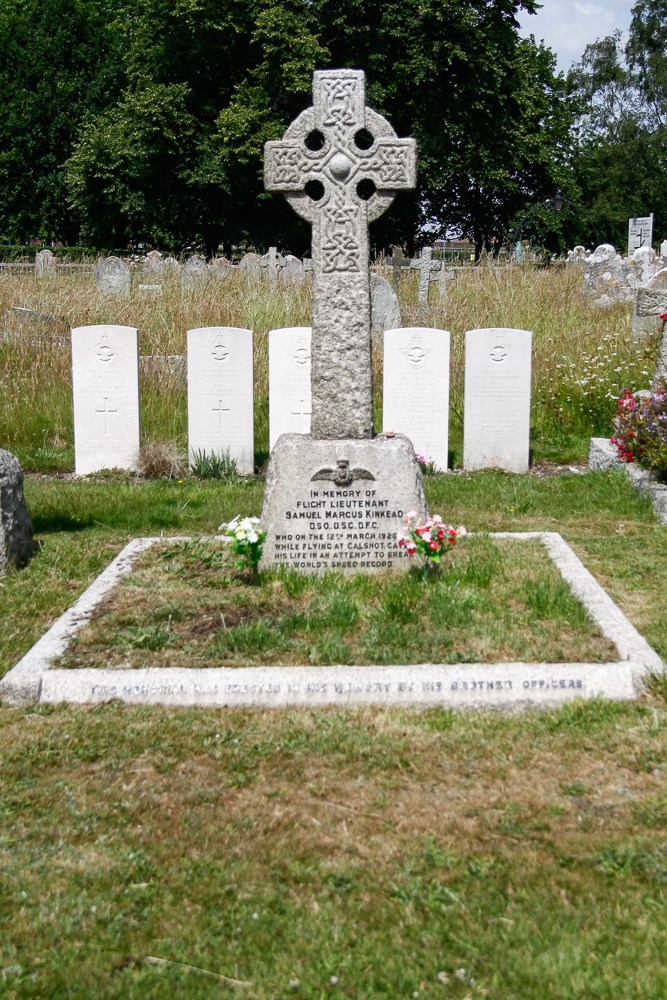
Samuel Kinkead's Gravestone at Fawley Church

In 1928, while in command of the RAF High Speed Flight, Kinkead was killed in a plane crash as he tried to become the first man to travel at more than five miles a minute in a Supermarine S.5 near Calshot England. The circumstances of his death have never been satisfactorily explained although a verdict of death by misadventure was passed at the inquest. The witnesses to the crash thought Kinkead was flying very low and very fast when his S.5 dived into moderately deep water near the Calshot Lightship. Although the RAF Duty Motorboat quickly buoyed the wreck site it took two days for the salvage vessel to find and retrieve the wreckage that had split into two parts. The remains were taken to Calshot and the controls were laid out on the slipway to check for any technical fault but the inspector could find nothing technically wrong with the machine. It was at first thought that Kinkead had been thrown clear of the machine during the crash but his body was found, minus half of his head, compressed into the tail. The tail had to be cut open in order to retrieve the body. It was quite obvious that Sam Kinkead had died instantly.

Although neither the RAF inquiry nor the Coroner's Inquest were able to give a definitive cause for the accident, D'Arcy Grieg (the pilot who took over from Kinkead) had his own theory as to what had happened. He ruled out mechanical failure of the aircraft because they were too well maintained but said Kinkead was killed by a combination of factors including recovering from a bout of malaria that would have him feeling 'a bit below par.' It was March and late in the afternoon. The sea was glass calm and therefore it was impossible to judge height accurately and there was a mist, so he had no horizon when coming in. Grieg also thought the fumes from the engine and the heat from the oil coolers would have turned the cockpit into an extremely hot Turkish bath. The autopsy, however, had found no evidence for carbon monoxide poisoning. Flying at over 300 miles per hour (480 km/h) and at no higher than 150 feet (46 m) Kinkead was never far from disaster.

Kinkead was buried at All Saints' Church, Fawley – the headstone on his grave reads:

In memory of Flight Lieutenant Samuel Marcus Kinkead DSO DSC DFC who, on 12 March 1928 while flying at Calshot, gave his life in an attempt to break the world's speed record.

== 90th Anniversary Memorial Service ==
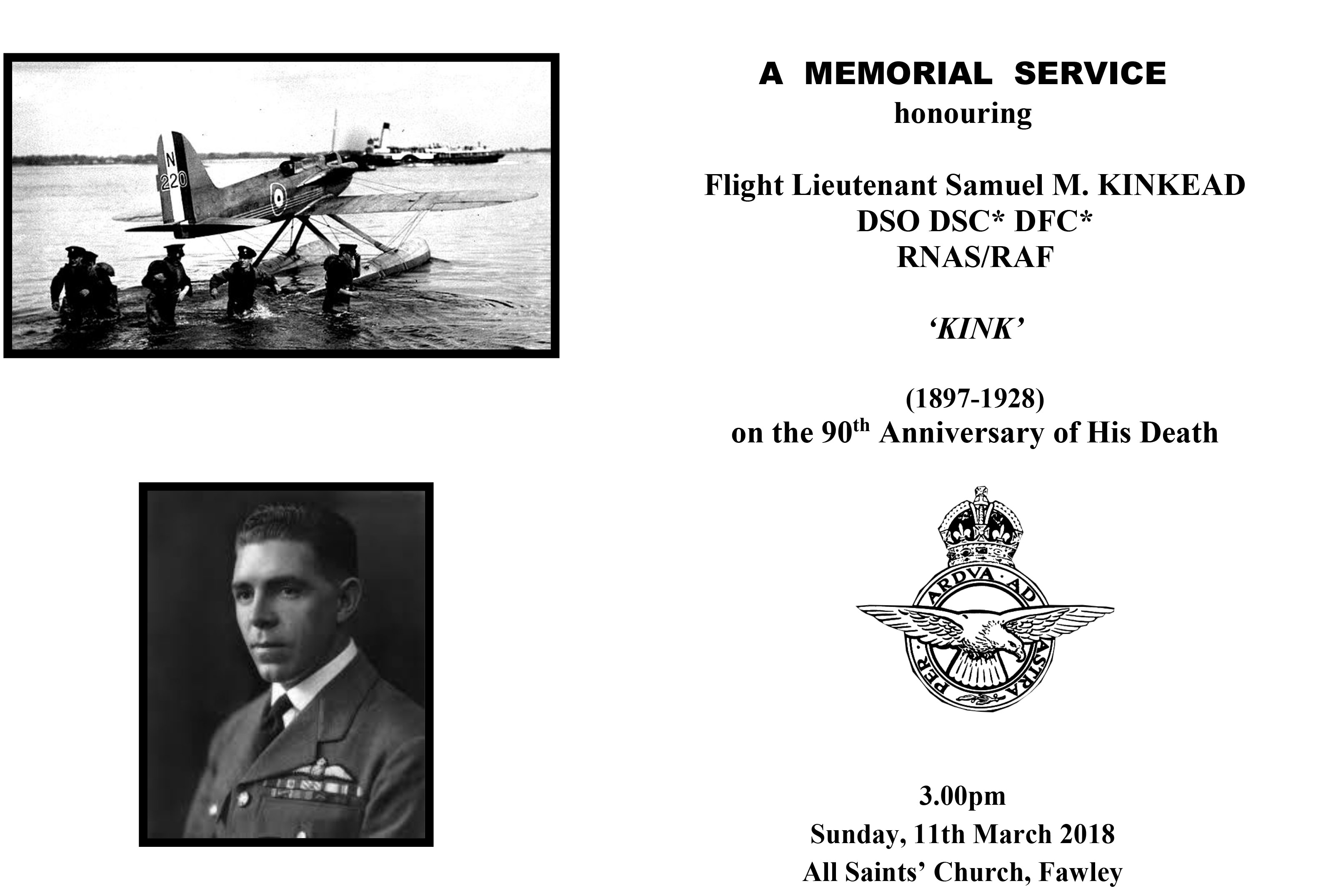
Front Cover of Memorial Service for Samual Kinkead held at All Saints' Church Fawley.

In 2018, the 90th anniversary of his death, a special memorial service was held at All Saints' Church, Fawley on 11 March. The service was conducted by Padre Glyn Williams, a retired RAF padre, with a tribute by Julian Lewis MP.

== Awards ==
=== Distinguished Service Cross ===
Flt.-Lieut. Samuel Marcus Kinkead, R.N.A.S.

In recognition with the skill that he displayed fighting in combat, notably on the following occasions: On 24 October 1917, he brought down an enemy, and immediately afterwards encountered and drove off a group of seven hostile aeroplanes. On 4 December 1917, he brought down an two-seater machine completely out of control. By his skill and determination in attacking enemy machines he has always shown a fine example to other pilots.

=== Distinguished Service Cross Bar ===
Flt. Lieut. Samuel Marcus Kinkead, D.S.C., R.N.A.S.

On 22 March 1918, he attacked an Albatros scout which was attacking a French aircraft. He has brought down many other enemy machines. He was a capable pilot, and participated in offensive patrols and low flying missions.

=== Distinguished Flying Cross (DFC) ===
Lt. (T./Capt.) Samuel Marcus Kinkead, D.S.C.

As a temporary Captain during this period, Samuel Marcus Kinkead was known for his tactical leadership while fighting superior enemy formations. During one specific aerial fight, Kinkead led his patrol to stop a larger force of enemy aircraft that were fighting allied planes and the intervention resulted in the destruction of three enemy aircraft and the scattering of the remaining hostile formation.

=== Distinguished Flying Cross (DFC) Bar ===
Lt. (T./Capt.) Samuel Marcus Kinkead, D.S.C., D.F.C.

On a recent date this officer engaged a large party of troops in a wood. The engagement lasted for an hour, but so persistent was his attack that the enemy finally broke and dispersed. During this attack he was harassed by six hostile scouts. Later on he shot down an enemy two-seater in our lines.

=== Distinguished Service Order (DSO) ===
Flying Officer Samuel Marcus Kinkead, D.S.C., D.F.C. (late H.L. Inf. and R.N.A.S.), " A " Detachment.

On 12 October 1919, near Kotluban, this officer led a formation of Camel machines and attacked the Cavalry Division of Boris Dumenko.

By skilful tactics in low flying he dispersed this force, which had turned the left flank of the Caucasian Army, and threatened to jeopardise the whole defence of Tsaritsyn.

Flying Officer Kinkead has carried out similar attacks on enemy troops, batteries, camps and transport with great success at considerable personal risk.
