= Submarine aircraft carriers of Japan =

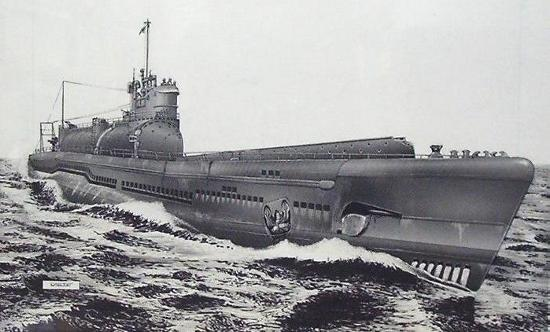
The I-400, of the Type Sentoku, the pinnacle of submarine aircraft carriers.

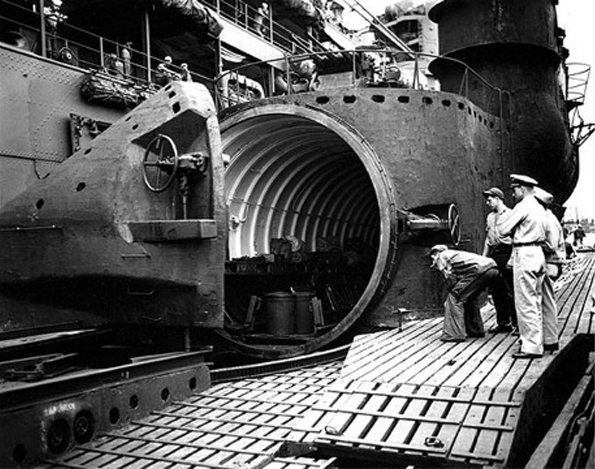
US Navy personnel inspect the aircraft hangar of the I-400 after World War II.

Submarine aircraft carriers were developed by the Imperial Japanese Navy to a greater extent than any other navy, before and during World War II. In total, 42 were built, as listed below (other sources say 47). Although other navies had experimented with submarine aircraft carriers, by World War II the IJN was the only navy (aside from one fielded by the French Navy) using them. They had little effect on the war, although two were used to carry out attacks (only one air raid) on the continental United States.

They almost all carried a single floatplane for reconnaissance only, being either the Watanabe E9W, Yokosuka E6Y, or Yokosuka E14Y. The only exceptions being the Junsen Type A Mod.2 and Type Sentoku, who carried respectively two or three Aichi M6A Seiran bomber. All apart from the first (I-5) had a fixed catapult and hangar or hangars, generally on the forward deck.

== List of submarine carriers ==
Junsen I Type Mod. (one built, I-5)
The first IJN submarine to carry a floatplane, completed 1 July 1932. No catapult was fitted, the I-5 aircraft was assembled on deck and lowered into the water for takeoff. Had two hangars.
Junsen II Type (one built, I-6)
Carried one floatplane
Junsen III Type (two built, I-7 and I-8)
Carried one floatplane, fitted with fixed catapult aft and twin hangars. I-8 was the only submarine to complete a round-trip voyage between Japan and Europe during World War II.
Junsen Type A (three built, I-9, I-10, I-11)
Carried one floatplane, two more cancelled 1942.
Junsen Type A Mod.1 (one built, I-12)
Carried one floatplane, hangar and catapult fitted forward.
Junsen Type A Mod.2 (two built, I-13, I-14)
Carried two floatplanes, catapult forward, serving as a template for the Sentoku Type. Two not completed and three more cancelled.
Junsen Type B (twenty built, numbered I-15 through I-39)
Carried one floatplane, hangar and catapult fitted forward. I-25 was the only submarine that carried out a shelling of the USA mainland.
Junsen Type B Mod.1 (six built, numbered I-40 through I-45)
Carried one floatplane, hangar and catapult fitted forward. Numbers 702 through 709 cancelled.
Junsen Type B Mod.2 (three built, I-54, I-56, I-58)
Carried one floatplane, hangar and catapult forward. 12 more cancelled) I-58 had aircraft and catapult replaced by Kaiten.
Sentoku Type (three built, I-400, I-401, I-402)
Carried three floatplanes, catapult forward. Were designed specifically to launch floatplane bombers against the Panama Canal. Two not completed, others cancelled.

== See also ==
- Submarine aircraft carriers
- Imperial Japanese Navy submarines
- List of undersea-carried planes during World War II#Japan
