= Observation seaplane =

Military seaplanes used as observation posts

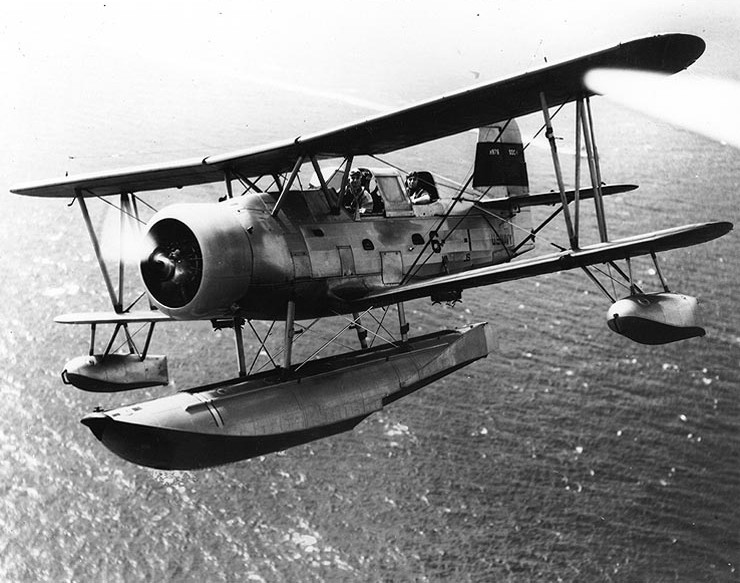
Curtis SOC Seagull

Observation seaplanes are military aircraft with flotation devices allowing them to land on and take off from water. Their primary purpose was to observe and report enemy movements or to spot the fall of shot from naval artillery, but some were armed with machineguns or bombs. Their military usefulness extended from World War I through World War II. They were typically single-engine machines with catapult-launch capability and a crew of one, two or three. Most were designed to be carried aboard warships, but they also operated from seashore harbors.

== Purpose and history ==
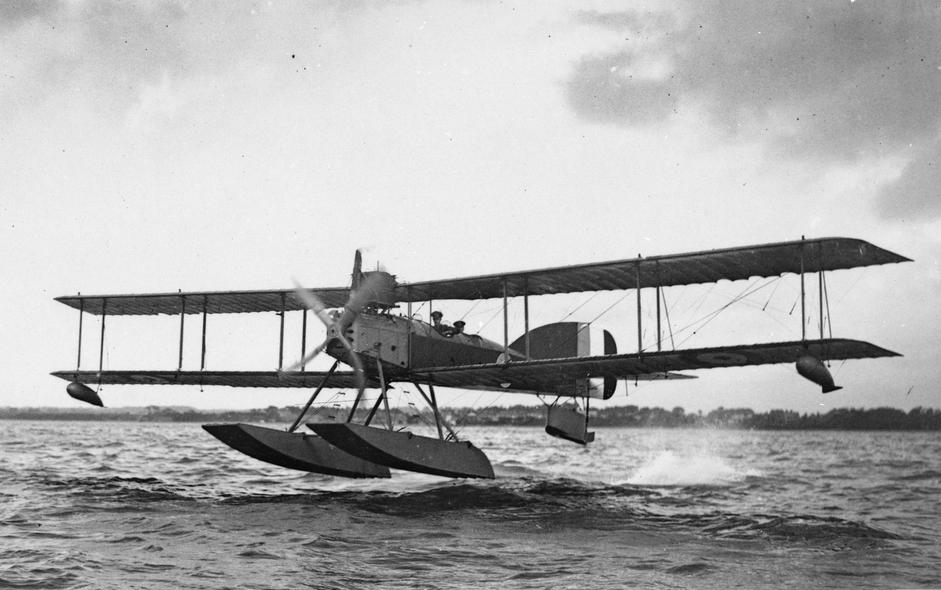
A Short 184 like this one was the first observation seaplane to participate in a naval battle.

As the range of dreadnought battleship guns exceeded the distance from which shipboard personnel could observe shell splashes, observation aircraft were employed to:

- locate targets
- observe fall of shot for trajectory correction of large caliber naval artillery, and
- assess damage to enemy ships.

Wartime experience following the 1916 Battle of Jutland indicated additional usefulness for:

- directing submarines to positions for torpedo kill-shots on disabled enemy capital ships
- search and rescue missions, and
- air cover for infantry landing operations.

As aircraft carriers replaced battleships during World War II, observation seaplanes became vulnerable to radar-directed fighter aircraft and were reassigned for:

- reconnaissance and photo intelligence gathering,
- liaison, and
- radio communication support for local activities including amphibious operations.

Their shipboard roles were replaced by helicopters following the second world war.

== Catapult and recovery procedures ==
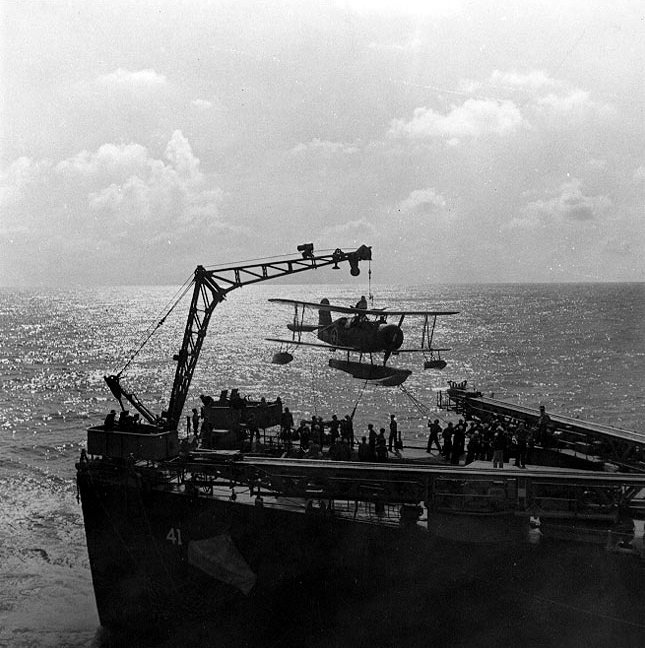
Curtiss Seagull being recovered by USS Philadelphia

Seaplane recovery and launch aboard HNLMS De Ruyter

After the plane was fueled and the engine warmed up, or the engine oil pre-heated, the pilot and observer would climb into their aircraft and rev the engine at full throttle. If the instrument panel readings were satisfactory, the pilot would brace for takeoff and signal the catapult operator he was ready. The United States Navy 30 ft (9.1 m) catapult used a smokeless powder charge to accelerate the plane to 80 mi (130 km) per hour. (0 to 80 in one-half second)

A capital ship preparing to recover its aircraft would steam into the wind and signal the aviator which way it would turn across the wind to provide a sheltered landing surface. When the plane was in position the ship would turn so the plane could land on the lee side as close as possible to the ship. The ship would tow a net along the water surface from a boom on the lee side, and the plane would taxi over the net so a hook on the underside of the float would engage the net allowing the plane to cut power and minimize relative movement of the plane with respect to the ship while the ship's crane hoisted the plane aboard.

== United States ==
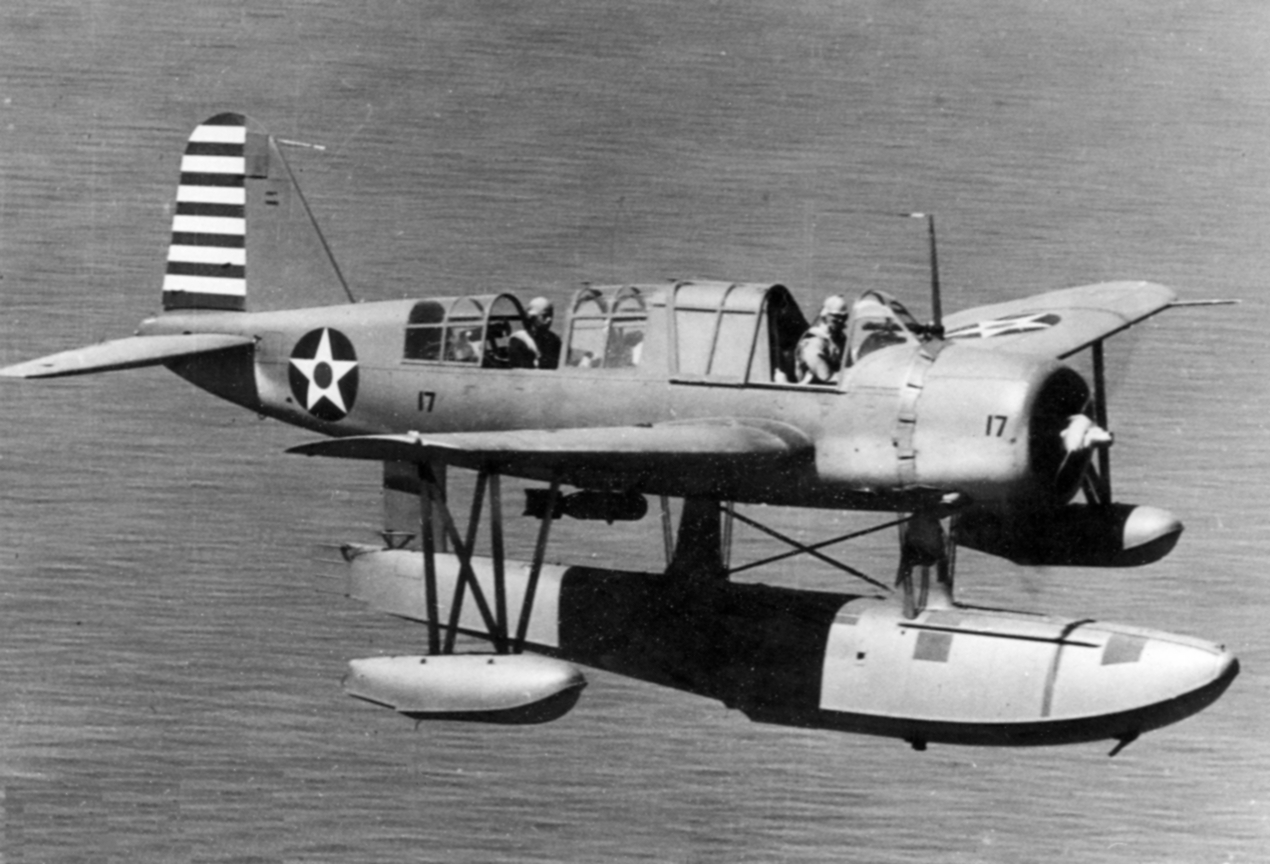
Vought OS2U Kingfisher monoplane

Two early aircraft assembled by Glenn Curtiss prior to formation of the Curtiss Aeroplane and Motor Company arrived aboard USS Mississippi on 24 April 1914 under the command of Henry C. Mustin to conduct aerial reconnaissance during the United States occupation of Veracruz. This was the first operational use of naval aircraft and the first time U.S. aviators of any service were the target of ground fire. On 5 November 1915 Mustin pioneered United States Navy catapult operations piloting an AB-2 seaplane launched from the cruiser USS North Carolina. Interest in aerial observation increased as combat experience during first world war naval engagements demonstrated the inability of shipboard observers to accurately report fall of shot from the engagement range of dreadnought battleships. Nine Vought VE-7s were delivered in 1924 to be launched from battleship catapults. Subsequent design improvements were the Vought FU and Vought O2U Corsair. A few Berliner-Joyce OJ float planes were built for the Omaha class light cruiser catapults. The Curtiss SOC Seagull became the dominant United States Navy catapult seaplane in 1935, until the number of Vought OS2U Kingfishers manufactured during the second world war exceeded the total production of all previous United States Navy observation seaplanes. In the absence of gunnery engagements with other warships, capital ships' observation seaplanes were used to spot naval gunfire support; but they proved so vulnerable to land-based fighters during the amphibious invasion of Sicily that their pilots flew conventional fighters spotting gunfire for the invasion of Normandy. A few Curtiss SC Seahawks remained operational into the late 1940s until helicopters became reliable enough to replace observation seaplanes.

== United Kingdom ==
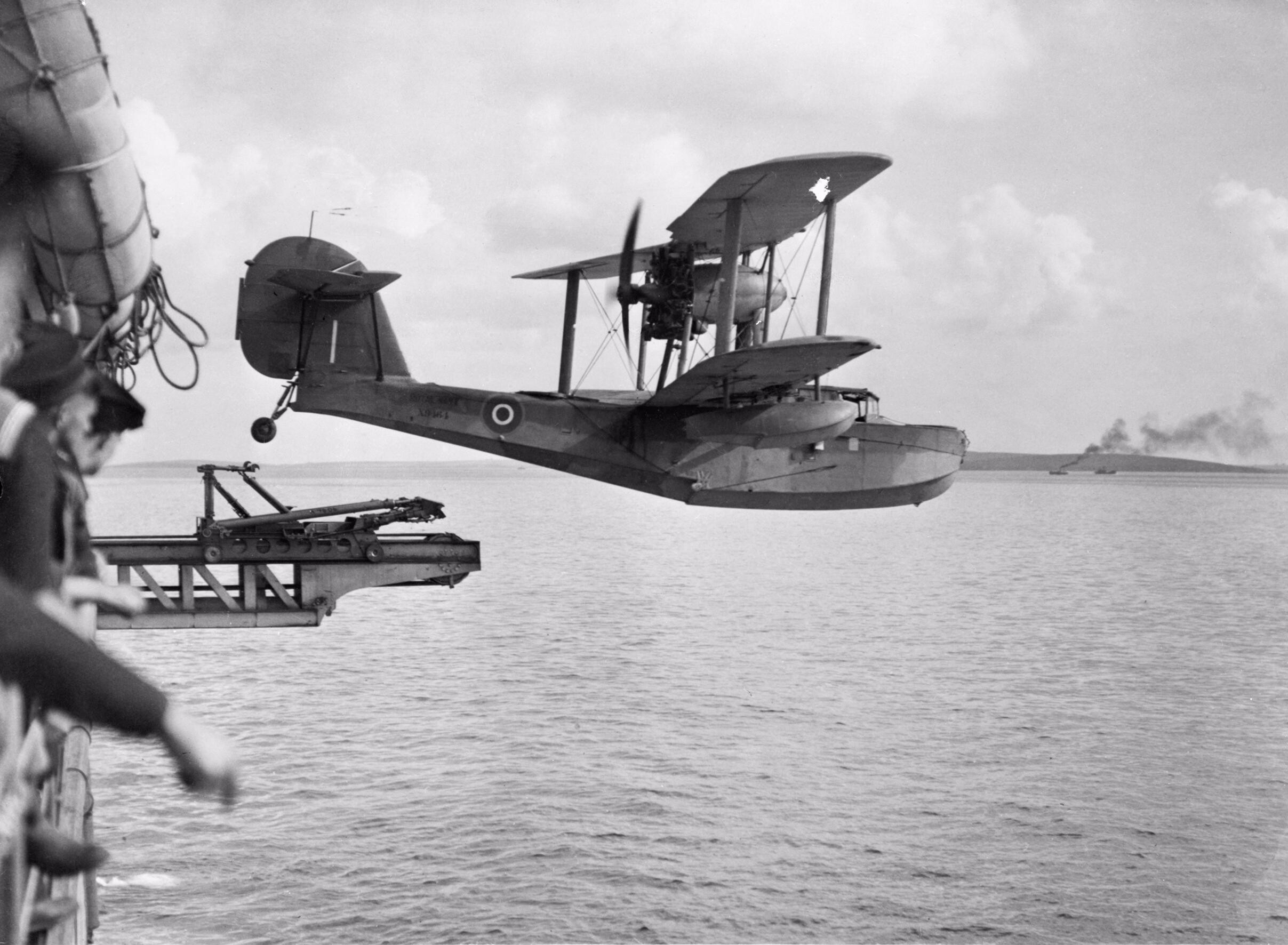
This Supermarine Walrus being launched from the catapult of HMS Bermuda illustrates the flying boat fuselage.

The first seaplane used in a naval battle was a Short Type 184 launched from HMS Engadine in the opening stages of the 1916 Battle of Jutland. The plane was forced down by a broken fuel line after locating a few cruisers, and the clumsy procedure of finding calm water to offload and launch took so long that Engadine's other planes were unable to meaningfully participate. This experience encouraged development of the Fairey III to be operated from aircraft carriers. The Supermarine Seagull II was the first British aircraft to be catapult launched in 1925. This design was improved as the Supermarine Walrus serving aboard capital ships of the Royal Navy through the second world war. Royal Navy preference for the flying boat fuselage was unusual among the shipboard observation seaplanes of the major naval powers.

== Japan ==
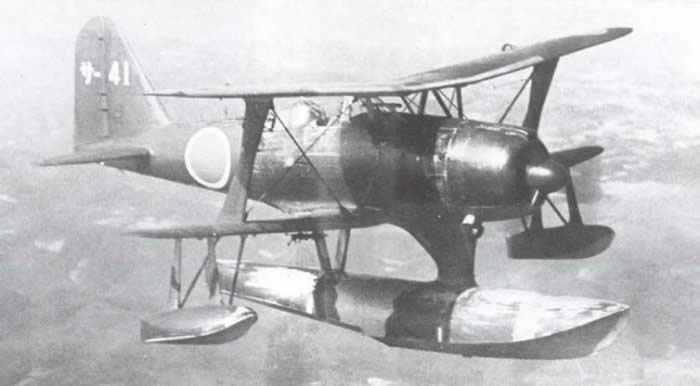
Mitsubishi F1M with air combat capability

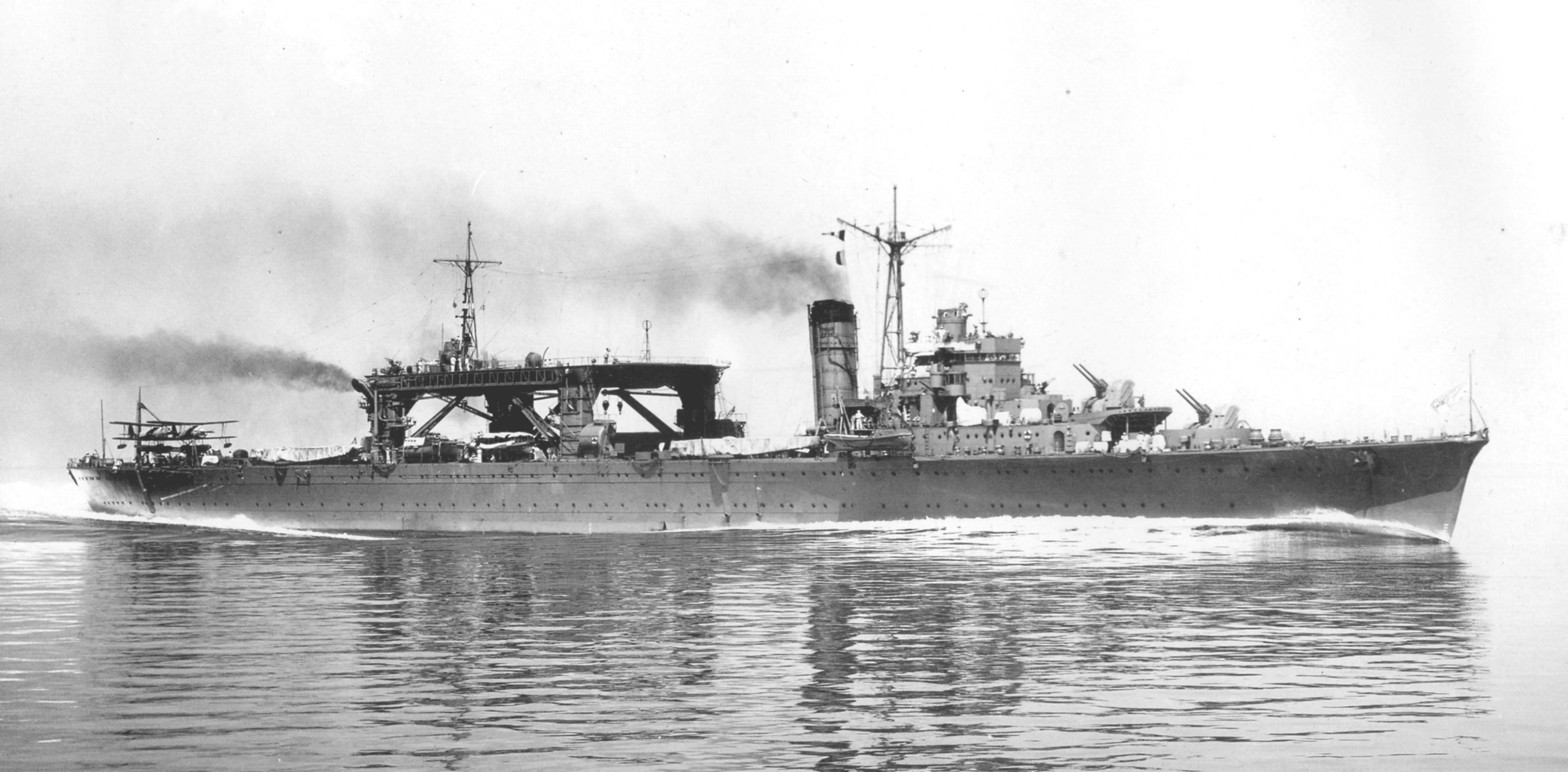
This Japanese Chiyoda-class 29 kn (54 km/h; 33 mph) seaplane tender carried 24 seaplanes

When the Washington Naval Treaty left Japan with fewer capital ships than the United States or the United Kingdom, the country focused on aviation as a means of balancing naval power. Although according to the Japanese Navy aircraft designation system, only the Mitsubishi F1M was officially designated as an "observation seaplane" (F prefix), there were numerous similar "reconnaissance seaplanes" (E), as well as "flying boats" (H), "seaplane fighter" (N), and "special purpose seaplanes" (M), which could serve a similar role.

Japan produced observation and reconnaissance seaplanes in larger numbers and greater diversity than any other nation (with more than 4700 airframes). The first Japanese design was the Nakajima E2N in 1927. Increasing numbers of Nakajima E4N, Kawanishi E7K, and Nakajima E8N were manufactured before the Aichi E13A was produced in similar numbers to the American OS2U Kingfisher, with the Kawanishi E15K Shiun and Aichi E16A Zuiun being the ultimate development of the type.

Notably, both Tone class heavy cruisers where purpose built "aircraft cruisers", each carrying six seaplanes for the Kidō Butai reconnaissance role, to allow the full complement of aircraft carrier planes to focus on their attack role. In the later years of the war, several ships where converted to carry more seaplanes to accomplish the same role, such as the cruiser Mogami (1943), and the oiler Hayasui (1944). In addition to launching from capital ships, these Japanese seaplanes operated from fast seaplane tenders providing aviation support similar to aircraft carriers during fleet activities and amphibious operations.

=== F dessignation ===
The planes receiving the "F" designation (proper observation seaplanes) were required to fly and climb fast with a level of defense including armament and in-combat maneuverability. This requirement was not only for the traditional spotter functions but also for:

1. Air cover for local operations away from a fleet, and
2. Repelling of enemy reconnaissance planes.

In contrast, long operational range aircraft with less regard to armament and maneuverability received either the C, E, or R designations, respectively for carrier aircraft, seaplnes, and land-based aircraft, with also the Q designation for maritime pattrol and submarine-warfare.

Ministry of Navy issued a design request based on the F requirement in 1935, and comparative evaluation was carried out among F1A (Aichi), F1M (Mitsubishi) and F1K (Kawanishi) in flight testing. After a modification, Mitsubishi F1M won the Navy production contract with excellent climb rate and maneuverability, and went into service in 1941 with a formal Navy type designation "Type Zero Observation Aircraft". For a plane with floats, F1M2 performance was beyond expectations at the time with 9 min 36 s to 5000 m climb rate, and especially its maneuverability in dog-fights where pilots rated it superior to the Zero Fighter-converted fighter seaplane A6M2-N, which often surprised the US fighter pilots in the early stages of the Pacific Theater of WWII.

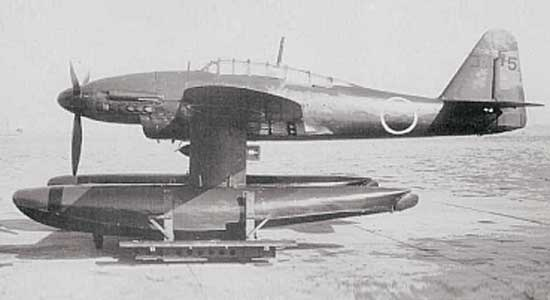
Aichi M6A Seiran , submarine launched seaplane

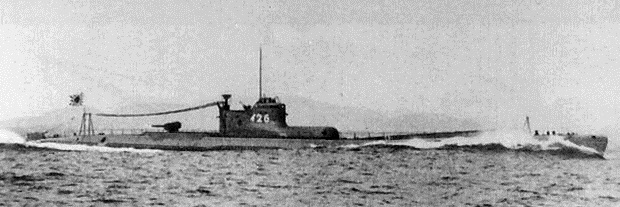
Japanese B1 type submarine with seaplane hangar forward of the conning tower

The 3 machine gun armament, high rate of climb and maneuverability of F1M2 proved versatile for liaison and search & rescue purposes as well in the deteriorating trends in the war with a good survivability, and the biplane remained onboard cruisers and battleships until the end of the war in 1945. Because of the success of F1M2 design, no further design request in this category was issued by the Navy. However, more armament and speed were increasingly required for the E Class in the later stages of war.

=== Submarine-based Seaplane ===
This class of seaplanes was not pioneered in Japan (Cox-Klemin XS was made in the US in 1922, British Parnall Peto flew in 1925, and Arado Ar 231 was tried in 1941 by Germany) but this category uniquely reached deployment in Japan, being the only nation operating submarine aircraft carriers during WWII (about 42 such submarines). The Yokosuka E6Y, Watanabe E9W and Yokosuka E14Y were specially designed to be carried and launched by submarines, and this series was further developed into submarine launched dive bomber / torpedo attacker Aichi M6A Seiran with maximum speed of 474 kilometres per hour (295 mph) and over 1,100 kilometres (680 mi) range, that was more than capable of observation/reconnaissance roles.

== Germany ==
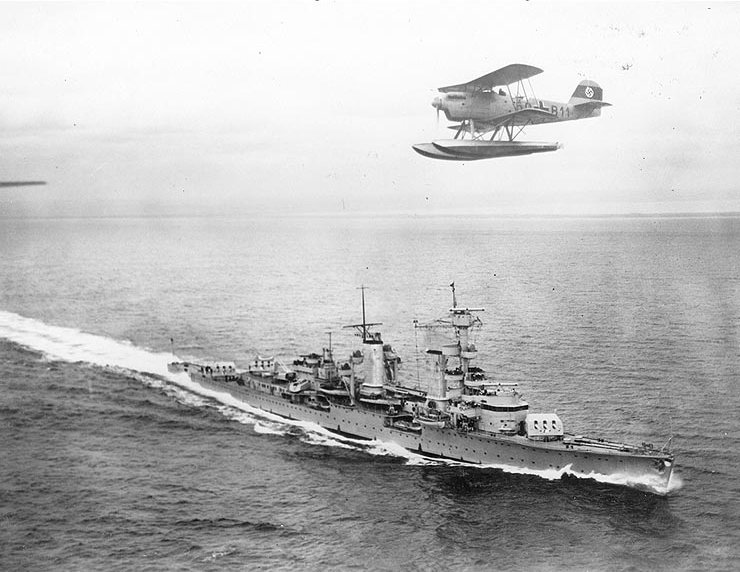
This Heinkel He 60 flying above the German light cruiser Köln uses the original dual float configuration.

German rearmament in the 1930s included Heinkel He 60, Heinkel He 114 and Arado Ar 196 float planes for launch from the catapults of the Kriegsmarine's capital ships. A few later operated aboard merchant raiders.

== Comparison of ship-launched seaplanes ==
The following is not an exhaustive list. However, it compares the observation and reconnaissance seaplanes produced in greatest numbers.

Name	Nation	Type	Range	Max Speed	Machine Guns	Produced	Number built
Kawanishi E7K	Japan	Twin-float biplane	137 mi (220 km)	171 mph (275 km/h)	3 x .303"	1935-1941	733
Curtiss SOC Seagull	United States	Single-float biplane	675 mi (1,086 km)	165 mph (266 km/h)	2 x .30"	1935-1940	322
Nakajima E8N	Japan	Single-float biplane	558 mi (898 km)	190 mph (310 km/h)	2 x .303"	1935-1940	755
Supermarine Walrus	United Kingdom	Biplane flying boat	600 mi (970 km)	135 mph (217 km/h)	2 x .303"	1936-1944	775
Arado Ar 196	Germany	Twin-float monoplane	670 mi (1,080 km)	193 mph (311 km/h)	2 x 7.92 mm, 2 x 20 mm	1938-1944	541
Vought OS2U Kingfisher	United States	Single-float monoplane	908 mi (1,461 km)	171 mph (275 km/h)	1 x .30"	1940-1944	1519
Mitsubishi F1M	Japan	Single-float biplane	460 mi (740 km)	230 mph (370 km/h)	3 x .303"	1941-1944	944
Aichi E13A	Japan	Twin-float monoplane	1,298 mi (2,089 km)	234 mph (377 km/h)	1 x .303"	1941-1944	1418
Aichi E16A Zuiun	Japan	Twin-float monoplane	731 mi (1,176 km)	273 mph (439 km/h)	2 x 20 mm, 1 x 13 mm	1944-1945	256
Curtiss SC Seahawk	United States	Single-float monoplane	625 mi (1,006 km)	313 mph (504 km/h)	2 x .50"	1944-1945	577

== See also ==
- Reconnaissance aircraft

Related lists

- List of flying boats and floatplanes
- List of submarine-borne aircraft
