= Yokosuka E6Y =

Japanese reconnaissance seaplane

E6Y

General information
- Type: Submarine-based reconnaissance aircraft
- National origin: Japan
- Manufacturer: Yokosuka Naval Air Technical Arsenal
- Status: Retired
- Primary user: Imperial Japanese Navy
- Number built: 10

History
- Introduction date: 1933
- First flight: 1929
- Retired: 1943

The Yokosuka E6Y (long designation: Yokosuka Navy Type 91-1 Reconnaissance Seaplane (九一式水上偵察機)) was a Japanese submarine-based reconnaissance seaplane developed at the Yokosuka Naval Air Technical Arsenal for the Imperial Japanese Navy during the 1920s. The prototype first flew as the Yokosho 2-Go (long designation: Yokosuka Arsenal No. 2 Reconnaissance Seaplane (横廠式二号水上偵察機)) in 1929.

The aircraft was a single-seat biplane that could be quickly assembled and disassembled so that it could be stored on board a submarine. Two prototypes were built that differed in power plant and design details. Eight production machines followed with the designation E6Y built by Kawanishi in the 1930s and served with the Japanese submarine aircraft carriers I-5, I-6, I-7 and I-8. They saw limited action during the January 28 incident and the Second Sino-Japanese War, the last example being retired in 1943.

== Development ==
The Imperial Japanese Navy was a pioneer in naval aviation, starting as early as 1912 with the purchase of two floatplanes from Britain and one from the United States. By December 1922, Japan had completed Hōshō, which vies with Hermes as the first ship purpose-designed for aircraft operations. Alongside that development, the Navy also looked at aircraft as a way to extend the operational reach of their large submarine force. Aware of the challenge of operations in the large expanse of the Pacific Ocean, the Navy was particularly looking at ways to improve their reconnaissance capability and saw submarine-based aircraft as a complement to land-based patrol. They acquired a German Caspar U.1 from the United States and a Parnall Peto from Britain, both early submarine-based reconnaissance aircraft. The two aircraft formed the basis for two prototype Japanese aircraft built for submarine-based reconnaissance, the 1-Go based on the former, while the latter heavily influenced the 2-Go.

== Design ==
The Yokosuka Naval Air Technical Arsenal (海軍航空技術廠, Yokosuka Kaigun Kōshō), which was abbreviated to Yokosho, developed the 2-Go as a smaller aircraft that the Peto. It was a biplane of mixed construction, with a steel frame and wooden-framed wings, covered in canvas. The wings were designed to detach for storage, as was the twin float assembly, which was also wooden. The first prototype was powered by the same engine as the Peto, an Armstrong Siddeley Mongoose five-cylinder radial engine, rated at 130 hp (97 kW), but manufactured under license by Mitsubishi.

The second prototype, designated 2-Go Kai, differed in a number of details. Lateral stability issues were resolved by increasing the tail fin and rudder, extending them upward. The aircraft was fitted with a more powerful Japanese Gasuden Jimpu seven-cylinder radial, rated at 160 hp (120 kW), which gave a maximum speed of 169 km/h (105 mph) and four and a half hours endurance.

In 1931, the Kawanishi Aircraft Company was commissioned to produce eight production machines, designated E6Y1, based on the 2-Go Kai, which were built between 1932 and 1934.

== Operational history ==
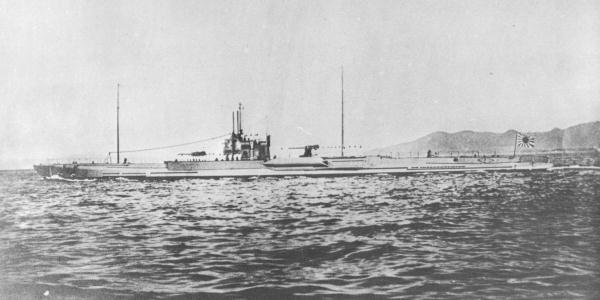
The submarine I-5, which carried the E6Y

The Navy took delivery of the 2-Go in May 1929 and initially tested it aboard the submarine I-51. Testing was completed by September 1931. The 2-Go Kai commenced testing in 1931 initially also on board I-51 and then subsequently the Junsen I Mod type submarine I-5. I-5 was not fitted with a hangar, but rather the aircraft was disassembled and stored in two cylindrical containers, one for the fuselage and the other for the wings, stored on the deck. Launch was initially from the water, but a catapult was fitted to I-5 in 1933 and this was found more satisfactory. All subsequent Japanese aircraft-carrying submarines used catapults.

The first production E6Y entered service in 1933, and the eight aircraft were deployed to the three Junsen II and III submarines, I-6, I-7 and I-8. The aircraft also saw surface ship use. They saw limited service during the January 28 incident in 1932, providing reconnaissance, and subsequently there are reports that they served on submarines that operated during the Second Sino-Japanese War. Between 1937 and 1938, submarines I-5 and I-6 were assigned to the Third Fleet (China Theatre Fleet) based at Hong Kong to patrol and blockade the central and southern Chinese coasts. As the Japanese Navy introduced larger aircraft carrying submarines, the E6Y was superseded by the Watanabe E9W. The last example retired in 1943.

== Variants ==
Yokosho 2-Go
First prototype equipped with a 130 horsepower (97 kW) Mitsubishi-licensed Armstrong Siddeley Mongoose.
Yokosho 2-Go Kai
Second prototype equipped by a 160 horsepower (120 kW) Gasuden Jimpu.
E6Y1
Production version of the 2-Go Kai manufactured by Kawanishi.

== Operators ==
Japan

- Imperial Japanese Navy Air Service

== Specifications (E6Y1) ==
Data from Mikesh & Abe, 1990

General characteristics

- Crew: 1
- Length: 6.69 m (21 ft 11 in)
- Wingspan: 8 m (26 ft 3 in)
- Height: 2.87 m (9 ft 5 in)
- Wing area: 26.70 m^{2} (287.4 sq ft)
- Empty weight: 570 kg (1,257 lb)
- Max takeoff weight: 750 kg (1,653 lb)
- Powerplant: 1 × Gasuden Jimpu 7-cylinder radial, 120 kW (160 hp)

Performance

- Maximum speed: 169 km/h (105 mph, 91 kn)
- Range: 600 km (370 mi, 320 nmi)
- Endurance: 4.4 hours
- Service ceiling: 4,800 m (15,700 ft)
- Time to altitude: 3,000 m (9,800 ft) in 20 minutes 14 seconds
- Power/mass: 5.77 kg (12.7 lb)/hp

Armament

- None

== See also ==
Aircraft of comparable role, configuration, and era

- Besson MB.411
- Caspar U.1
- Macchi M.53
- Martin MS
- Parnall Peto

Related lists

- List of military aircraft of Japan
- List of flying boats and floatplanes
- List of submarine-borne aircraft

== Bibliography ==
- Boyd, Carl; Yoshida, Akihiko (2002). The Japanese Submarine Force and World War II. Annapolis: Naval Institute Press. ISBN 978-1-55750-015-1.
- Carpenter, Dorr; Polmar, Norman (1986). Submarines of the Imperial Japanese Navy. London: Conway Maritime Press. ISBN 978-0-851-77396-4.
- Geoghegan, John (2013). Operation Storm: Japan's Top Secret Submarines and Its Plan to Change the Course of World War II. New York: Crown Publishers. ISBN 978-0-307-46480-4.
- Marriott, Leo (2006). Catapult Aircraft: Seaplanes That Flew From Ships Without Flight Decks. Barnsley: Pen and Sword. ISBN 978-1-844-15419-7.
- Mikesh, Robert C.; Abe, Shorzoe (1990). Japanese Aircraft 1910-1941. London: Putnam. ISBN 978-0-851-77840-2.
- Passingham, Malcolm (February 2000). "Les hydravions embarqués sur sous-marins" [Submarine-carried Seaplanes]. Avions: Toute l'aéronautique et son histoire (in French) (83): 7–17. ISSN 1243-8650.
- Passingham, Malcolm (March 2000). "Les hydravions embarqués sur sous-marins". Avions: Toute l'aéronautique et son histoire (in French) (84): 25–37. ISSN 1243-8650.
- Polmar, Norman (2011). Aircraft Carriers: A History of Carrier Aviation and Its Influence on World Events, Volume II: 1946-2006. Dulles: Potomac Books. ISBN 978-1-597-97343-4.
- Volkov, Dale (2014). "E6Y". Уголок неба (in Russian).
