= Japanese submarine I-5 =

Japanese Junsen type submarine-class

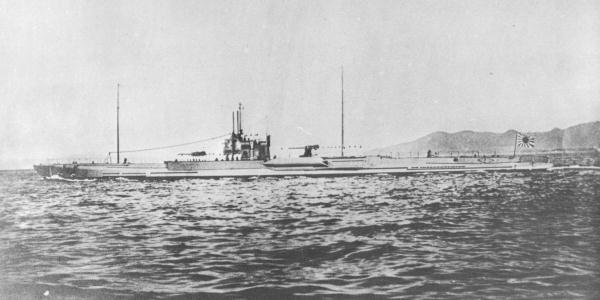
- I-5 at sea in 1932

History

Empire of Japan
- Name: I-5
- Builder: Kawasaki Dockyard Co., Kobe
- Laid down: 30 October 1929
- Launched: 19 June 1931
- Completed: 31 July 1932
- Stricken: 10 September 1944
- Fate: Believed sunk 19 July 1944

General characteristics
- Class & type: Junsen I Mod.
- Displacement: 2,279 t (2,243 long tons) (surfaced); 2,968 t (2,921 long tons) (submerged)
- Length: 97.5 m (319 ft 11 in)
- Beam: 9.22 m (30 ft 3 in)
- Draft: 4.94 m (16 ft 2 in)
- Installed power: 6,000 bhp (4,500 kW) (diesel engines); 2,600 bhp (1,900 kW) (electric motors)
- Propulsion: 2 shafts; 2 × diesel engines; 2 × electric motors
- Speed: 18.8 knots (34.8 km/h; 21.6 mph) surfaced; 8.1 knots (15.0 km/h; 9.3 mph) submerged
- Range: 24,000 nmi (44,000 km; 28,000 mi) at 10 knots (19 km/h; 12 mph) surfaced; 60 nmi (110 km; 69 mi) at 3 knots (5.6 km/h; 3.5 mph) submerged
- Test depth: 80 m (260 ft)
- Complement: 93
- Armament: 6 × 533 mm (21 in) torpedo tubes (all bow); 1 × 140 mm (5.5 in) deck gun; 1 × 7.7 mm (0.30 in) anti-aircraft machine gun
- Aircraft carried: 1 × Yokosuka E6Y floatplane

The Japanese submarine I-5 was the first aircraft-carrying submarine in the Imperial Japanese Navy and operated during World War II. The sole member of the Junsen 1 Mod. (巡潜一型改) class, the submarine was launched on 19 June 1931 at Kobe by Kawasaki. A single Yokosuka E6Y floatplane was carried. A catapult was fitted in 1938 but the capability to operate the aircraft was removed two years later and the boat was reconfigured as an attack submarine. By that time, I-5 had already seen wartime service.

In 1937, submarine served in the Second Sino-Japanese War as part of the Third Fleet patrolling the coasts of China, a role that the vessel reprised off the coast of the Hawaiian Islands during the attack on Pearl Harbor in 1941. The submarine subsequently supported the Dutch East Indies campaign and was then transferred to the Indian Ocean, where the boat sank a merchant vessel. After successfully supporting the Aleutian Islands campaign, the submarine was re-equipped as a transport to supply distant Japanese garrisons in 1943. The vessel, equipped with a Daihatsu-class landing craft, ran supplies as far afield as New Britain. I-5 went missing in 1944 and is believed to have been sunk by the United States Navy destroyer escort USS Wyman near the Mariana Islands with no survivors on 19 July.

== Design and development ==
During the period following World War I, the Imperial Japanese Navy saw the potential of aircraft carrying submarines, with investigations noted as early as 1924, when an American report stated, "special investigations are now in place at the Oppama (Yokosuka) Aviation Corps about airplane carrying submarines". These concepts culminated in a requirement for a submarine larger than existing cruiser submarines and capable of launching a single reconnaissance floatplane. In response, the Junsen 1 Mod. was developed based on the Junsen 1 (巡潜一型).

The submarine was similar in dimensions to the predecessors but had a larger displacement, 2,279 tonnes (2,243 long tons) surfaced and 2,968 tonnes (2,921 long tons) submerged. Length was 97.5 metres (319 ft 11 in), beam 9.22 m (30 ft 3 in) and draught 4.94 m (16 ft 2 in). Power was provided by two 3,000-brake-horsepower (2,237 kW) diesel engines which drove two shafts when running on the surface up to a maximum speed of 18.8 knots (34.8 km/h; 21.6 mph). These also charged the batteries that powered the vessel underwater. When submerged, power was provided by electric motors that provided 2,600 bhp (1,939 kW) and enabled a maximum speed of 8.1 knots (15.0 km/h; 9.3 mph). 589 tonnes (580 long tons) of fuel oil was carried which gave an endurance of 24,000 nautical miles (44,000 km; 28,000 mi) at 10 knots (19 km/h; 12 mph) on the surface. Submerged, the boat could travel for 60 nautical miles (110 km; 69 mi) at 3 knots (5.6 km/h; 3.5 mph). The submarine had a diving depth of 80 m (260 ft). The complement was 93, including officers. In addition, the submarine's large size meant that it could operate as a flagship.

The main armament was similar to the preceding Junsen 1 submarines, consisting of six internal 53.3 cm (21 in) torpedo tubes, all in the bow. Twenty torpedoes could be carried. At about the same time as the boat was entering service, the Japanese Navy introduced a new standard torpedo for submarines, the Type 89, which entered service in 1931. The torpedo delivered a warhead of 300 kilograms (660 lb) over a range of 5,500 metres (18,045 ft) at 45 knots (83 km/h; 52 mph). It remained in service until the early days of World War II until being replaced by the Type 95, which could carry a larger warhead further at a higher speed, being capable of propelling 405 kg (893 lb) of explosives over a range of 12,000 metres (39,370 ft) at up to 47 knots (87 km/h; 54 mph).

The deck was fitted with one mount for a single 14 cm (5.5 in) 40 calibre 11th Year Type gun, which could fire a 38 kg (84 lb) shell 1,600 metres (5,249 ft) at a rate of five rounds per minute. For anti-aircraft defence, a single 7.7 mm (0.30 in) machine gun was mounted on the conning tower.

A single Yokosuka E6Y observation floatplane was carried disassembled in two watertight retractable containers aft of the conning tower, one each port and starboard. The wings were stored in one container, the fuselage and floats in the other. To operate the aircraft, the submarine was required to stop, the containers deployed, the components assembled and the seaplane launched into the sea from which it would then take-off. During training, this proved a lengthy exercise during which the submarine was vulnerable to attack. Later, the deck was fitted with a catapult to increase the range of the aircraft and reduce the time of exposure, but this extended the time for launch required as the assembled aircraft had to be mounted on the catapult.

== Construction and career ==
I-5 was laid down on 30 October 1929 at Kawasaki Dockyard Co. in Kobe, launched on 19 June 1931, and commissioned on 31 July 1932. The vessel entered service and was attached to Yokosuka Naval District, undergoing training and trials until 1933 when a catapult was fitted during refit. Similarly, between February and July 1936, the deck gun was temporarily replaced with a 12.7 cm (5 in) Type 89 dual-purpose gun. At the start of the Second Sino-Japanese War in 1937, the submarine was attached to the Third Fleet (China Theatre Fleet) based at Hong Kong alongside the submarine tender Komahashi and a fleet of cruiser submarines. The fleet was tasked with patrolling and blockading the central and southern Chinese coasts. Between 21 and 23 August, the submarine was in the East China Sea, providing distant cover for two battle fleets built around the battlecruisers Haruna and Kirishima, and the battleships Mutsu and Nagato that ferried troops from Japan to China.

In 1940, the submarine was withdrawn from service and refitted. The commissioning of more modern submarine aircraft carriers, the Type A and Type B, meant that the less advanced installation on I-5 was deemed superfluous. Therefore, during the refit, the provision to operate an aircraft was removed and an aft deck gun fitted in its place. At the same time, a single 25 mm (1 in) Type 96 anti-aircraft gun was fitted to an extended bridge. The submarine re-entered service as an attack submarine.

On 16 November 1941, the submarine departed as part of the 2nd Submarine Squadron led by Admiral Mitsumi Shimizu in I-7, alongside I-4 and I-6. The boat arrived off the coast of Hawaii to take up a position west of Oahu and was tasked with patrolling the area and attacking any US Navy ships that attempted to sortie in response to the Japanese action. On 7 December, the submarine moved to patrol north of Molokai, shortly before the attack on Pearl Harbor. The boat then remained on station during the attack.

After a brief interlude on 9 January 1942 joining other vessels of the Japanese Navy to hunt for the aircraft carrier USS Lexington, the submarine returned to the Japanese mainland. Following a refit in Yokosuka between 2 and 11 February, the submarine then departed to support the Dutch East Indies campaign, arriving at Staring-baai in Sulawesi on 23 February. On 25 February, while patrolling west of Timor, the submarine was observed by a Mitsubishi C5M reconnaissance aircraft which was being escorted by a flight of nine Mitsubishi A6M Zero fighters. Thinking that they had spotted an enemy vessel, the fighters attacked the submarine, inflicting minor damage and injuring three officers. After repairs, the submarine was sent to the Indian Ocean to disrupt shipping and support the Indian Ocean raid. On 5 April, the ship sank the United States merchant ship SS Washingtonian. On 5 June, I-5 was transferred to the Aleutian Islands campaign and joined the force, led by Admiral Boshirō Hosogaya, that landed the Japanese Northern Army on Attu Island.

However, an increasingly challenging logistical situation meant that on 16 November 1942, Admiral Isoroku Yamamoto ordered that submarines be made available as transports. Admiral Teruhisa Komatsu, who was commander of the 6th Fleet and thus responsible for submarine operations, responded by ordering the conversion of thirteen submarines as transports. The submarines operated a vital service, transferring supplies and people. I-5 was one of the submarines converted and reassigned, and a Daihatsu-class landing craft was fitted on 17 March 1943 to enable the faster transfer of personnel and resources in what were termed "ant carrying transport" operations. Nine days after, the submarine started the first of nine supply runs between Lae and Rabaul. Later, the submarine was relocated to supply the garrison in the Aleutian Islands. In between, the submarine also undertook other missions, such as rescuing pilots of Mitsubishi G4M bombers shot down by US forces on 14 and 15 May.

In June 1944, the Japanese became aware that their forces in the Mariana Islands would be subject to attack and formed a submarine picket, including I-5, 300 nautical miles (560 km) east of the Islands. The submarine was subsequently sent on a supply run to Pohnpei between 5 and 9 July, and then sailed to Truk from whence the boat departed on 16 July. On 19 July, the US Navy destroyer escort USS Wyman identified a sonar contact 360 nautical miles (670 km) east of Guam. Hedgehog bombs were fired and a destroyed submarine reported. The victim is believed to be I-5. There were no survivors. The submarine was removed from the Navy List on 10 September 1944.
