= Japanese submarine I-51 =

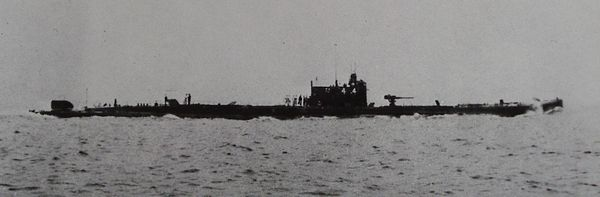
- Submarine No. 44 in 1924

History

Japan
- Name: Project S22
- Ordered: 1918 Fiscal Year
- Builder: Kure Naval Arsenal, Kure, Japan
- Laid down: 6 April 1921
- Launched: 29 November 1921
- Completed: 20 June 1924, as Submarine No. 44
- Commissioned: 20 June 1924
- Renamed: Submarine No. 44 by 20 June 1924
- Renamed: I-51, 1 November 1924
- Homeport: Kure Naval District
- Decommissioned: 15 December 1938
- Stricken: 1 April 1940
- Renamed: Haikan No. 3 or Haisein No. 3 on 1 April 1940
- Fate: Hulked 1 April 1940; Sold and scrapped 1941

General characteristics
- Class & type: Kaidai-class submarine (Type I)
- Displacement: 1,833 long tons (1,862 t) surfaced; 2,602 long tons (2,644 t) submerged
- Length: 99.44 m (326 ft 3 in)
- Beam: 8.81 m (28 ft 11 in)
- Draught: 4.6 m (15 ft 1 in)
- Propulsion: 4 × Sulzer diesel engines,5,200 hp (3.9 MW) (2 removed 1932); 4 x electric motors, 2,000 hp (1.5 MW); 4 shafts (2 removed 1932)
- Speed: 18.5 knots (34.3 km/h; 21.3 mph) (surfaced); 8.4 kn (15.6 km/h; 9.7 mph) (submerged)
- Range: 20,000 nmi (37,000 km) @ 10 kn (19 km/h; 12 mph) (surfaced); 100 nmi (190 km) @ 4 kn (7.4 km/h; 4.6 mph) (submerged)
- Endurance: 47.5 m (156 ft)
- Complement: 70 officers and men
- Armament: 6 × 533 mm (21 in) forward torpedo tubes; 2 × 533 mm (21 in) aft torpedo tubes; 1 x 12 cm/45 10th Year Type naval gun (removed 1932); 24 × naval mines
- Aircraft carried: 1 × Yokosho 2-Go or Yokosho 2-Go Kai floatplane (added 1931)
- Aviation facilities: 1 x hangar (added 1931); 1 x aircraft catapult (added 1933)

I-51 (伊号第五一潜水艦, I-gō Dai Gojū-ichi sensuikan), previously Project S22 and Submarine No. 44, was a submarine in commission in the Imperial Japanese Navy from 1924 to 1938. Although not a successful design, she was the lead vessel and prototype of the Japanese Kaidai-class submarines which served in World War II. The Japanese also used her for early experiments in the development of submarine aircraft carriers.

== Background ==
Following World War I, the Imperial Japanese Navy General Staff began to re-consider submarine warfare as an element of fleet strategy. Before the war, the Imperial Japanese Navy regarded submarines as useful only for short-range coastal point defense. However, based on the success of the Imperial German Navy in deploying long-range cruiser submarines for commerce raiding during World War I, Japanese strategists came to realize the potential for using submarines for long-range reconnaissance, as well as in a war of attrition against an enemy fleet approaching Japan. Procurement of a large, long-range Japanese submarine was authorized in fiscal year 1918 under the Eight-six fleet program, under the designation Project S22.

== Design ==
Japanese ties to the United Kingdom via the Anglo-Japanese Alliance were still strong in the immediate aftermath of World War I, and Project S22 was based on the latest Royal Navy design, the British K-class submarine. With a displacement of 1390 tons, Project S22 was the largest submarine built in Japan up to that time. In order to attain a design speed of 23 knots (43 km/h; 26 mph) on the surface and 15 knots (28 km/h; 17 mph) submerged, the design required four diesel engines driving four screws. To accommodate these engines, a double hull design was used, with hulls joined side-by-side, forming a sideways figure "8". As completed, I-51 achieved only 18.4 knots (34.1 km/h; 21.2 mph) surfaced and 8.4 knots (15.6 km/h; 9.7 mph) submerged during trials, but had an unrefueled range of 20,000 nautical miles (37,000 km; 23,000 mi), which was considered remarkable for the time.

Despite various technical achievements the Japanese made in I-51′s design, they did not regard her as a successful design, largely because of problems with her Sulzer diesel engines. She saw only limited fleet service.

== Construction and commissioning ==
Project S22 was laid down at the Kure Naval Arsenal in Kure, Japan, on 6 April 1921, launched on 29 November 1921, and completed on 20 June 1924, by which time she had received the name Submarine No.44 (第四四号潜水艦, Dai-Yonjūyon-go sensuikan).

== Operational history ==
Upon completion, Submarine No. 44 was commissioned and attached to the Kure Naval District. From 17 July 1924 to 1 May 1925, she was assigned to Submarine Squadron 2 in the 2nd Fleet, a component of the Combined Fleet, and during her stint with the squadron she was renamed I-51 on 1 November 1924. She returned to duty in the Kure Naval District from 1 May until 1 December 1925, when she was assigned along with the submarine I-52 to Submarine Division 17, which was reactivated that day as a component of Submarine Squadron 2, which in turn remained part of the 2nd Fleet in the Combined Fleet. On 10 December 1928, Submarine Division 17 was reassigned to the Kure Naval District.

I-51 remained a part of Submarine Division 17 until the division's deactivation on 11 November 1935. The division was assigned to the Kure Naval District throughout the years from December 1928 to November 1935, also serving in the Kure Defense Division from 30 November 1929 to 1 December 1930 and again from 1 October 1932 to 1 January 1933. Unsuccessful in fleet service due to problems with her diesel engines, I-51 never returned to the fleet after Submarine Division 17's reassignment to the Kure Naval District in 1928. Instead, she was retained as part of Submarine Division 17 at the Kure Naval Arsenal for crew training and as a test bed for various submarine technologies.

In May 1929, I-51 began experimental work in submarine-based operation of the Yokosho 2-Go, the first prototype of the Yokosuka E6Y floatplane. She completed this testing program by September 1931. In 1931 she was fitted with an aircraft hangar which could house one floatplane which could be raised and lowered into the water by a crane, and she began testing the operation of the second E6Y prototype, the Yokosho 2-Go Kai. In 1933, an aircraft catapult was installed on her deck, making her the forerunner of the Japanese submarine aircraft carriers of World War II.

In addition to her experimental work, I-51 began duty in 1930 as a training submarine at Kure. In 1932, two of her diesel engines and their associated shafts were removed, as was her main deck gun.

After the deactivation of Submarine Division 17 on 15 November 1935, I-51 was attached directly to the Kure Naval District, and she continued her training duties until she was decommissioned and placed in the Fourth Reserve on 15 December 1938. While in the Fourth Reserve, she was reassigned to the Maizuru Naval District on 15 November 1939.

I-51 was removed from the navy list on 1 April 1940, and she was hulked that day with the name Haikan No. 3 or Haisen No. 3. She was sold and scrapped in 1941.
