= LFG Stralsund V 19 Putbus =

LFG V.19 Putbus
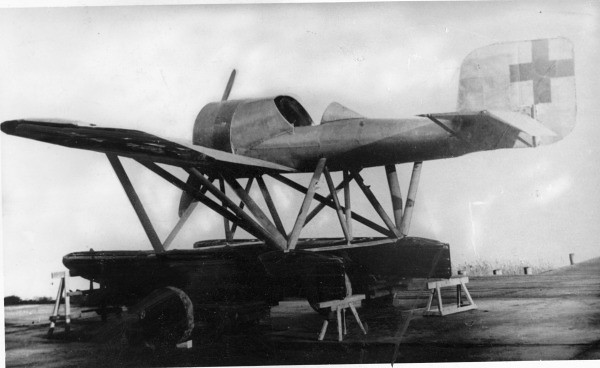

General information
- Type: Reconnaissance flying boat
- National origin: Germany
- Manufacturer: LFG Roland
- Number built: 1

History
- First flight: 1918

The LFG Stralsund V 19 Putbus was a submarine-borne floatplane scout designed and built by LFG Roland in the latter stages of World War I.

== Design ==
The V 19 Putbus was a single-seat long-wing monoplane made from aluminum. The fuselage was tube-shaped, made from flat wrapped duraluminum, and the fuel was stored in the wings, which had automatic shut-off valves that allowed the wings to be removed without draining the fuel tanks.

== Developmental history ==
The LFG Stralsund V 19 Putbus was completed in September 1918 and conducted flight tests on behalf of the Imperial German Navy until the Armistice. Three production V 19s were ordered, but none were built by the time the Armistice was signed in November 1918. Interestingly, the Putbus was spared from demolition and scrapping under the terms of the Inter-Allied Disarmament Commission and continued to fly until 1923, when it was eventually scrapped after failing to find a commercial role.

== Specifications ==
Data from

General characteristics

- Crew: 1
- Length: 6.6 m (21 ft 8 in)
- Wingspan: 9.9 m (32 ft 6 in)
- Height: 1.9 m (6 ft 3 in)
- Empty weight: 736 kg (1,623 lb)
- Gross weight: 951 kg (2,097 lb)
- Powerplant: 1 × Oberursel U.II 9-cylinder air-cooled rotary piston engine, 82 kW (110 hp)

Performance

- Maximum speed: 180 km/h (112 mph, 97 kn)

== See also ==
Related development

- Hansa-Brandenburg W.20

Related lists

- List of submarine-borne aircraft
