= USS S-1 =

S-class submarine of the United States

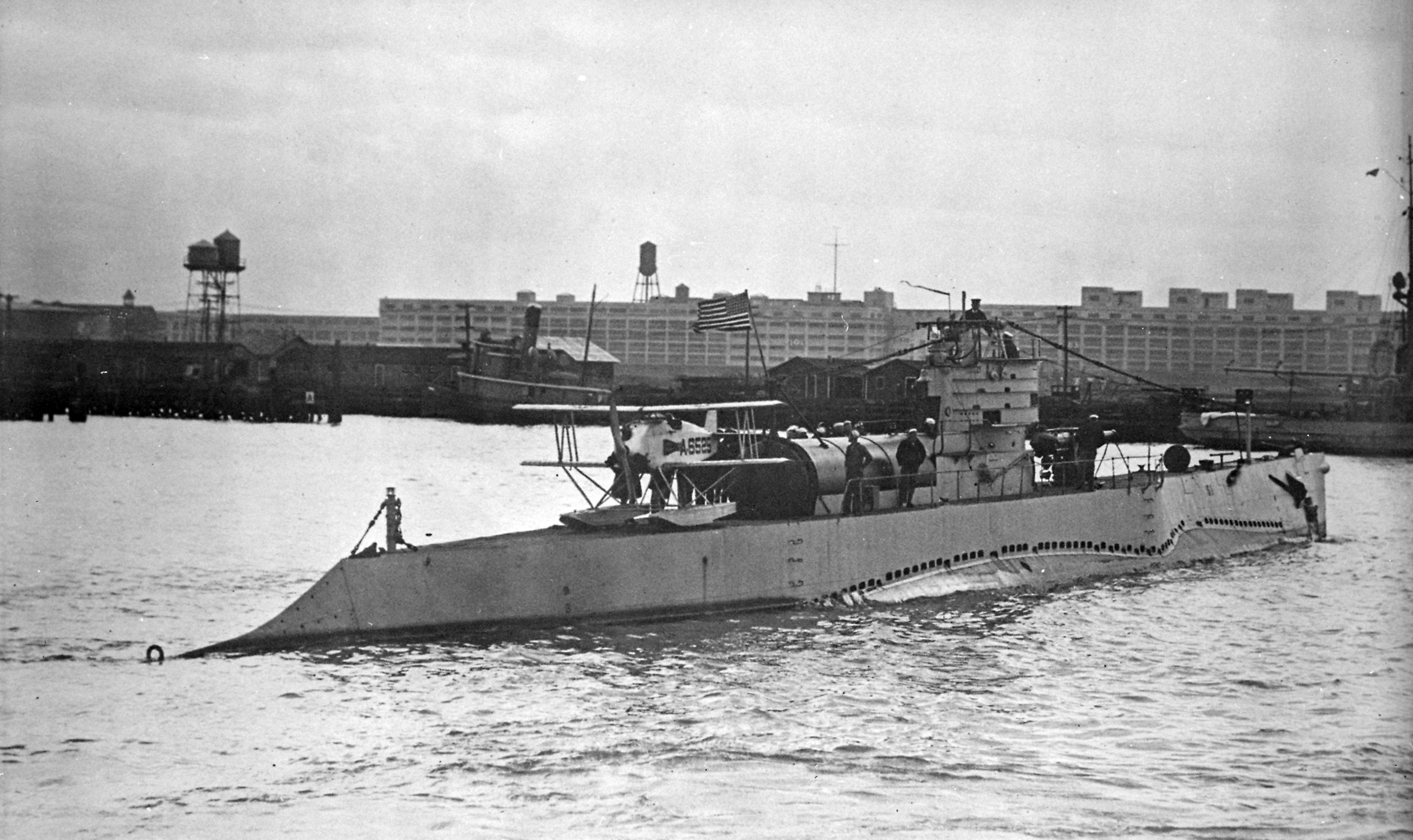
- USS S-1 (SS-105), 24 October 1923, a Martin MS-1 (Bureau # A-6525) scouting floatplane on her after deck, probably at Norfolk, Virginia

History

United States
- Name: S-1
- Builder: Fore River Shipbuilding Company, Quincy, Massachusetts
- Cost: $1,102,931.80 (hull and machinery)
- Laid down: 11 December 1917
- Launched: 26 October 1918
- Sponsored by: Mrs. Elizabeth Land
- Commissioned: 5 June 1920
- Decommissioned: 20 October 1937
- Recommissioned: 16 October 1940
- Decommissioned: 20 April 1942
- Stricken: 24 June 1942
- Identification: Hull symbol: SS-105 (17 July 1920); Call sign: NIMG
- Fate: Transferred to United Kingdom, 20 April 1942

United Kingdom
- Name: P.552
- Acquired: 20 April 1942
- Fate: Returned to USN, 16 October 1944; Sold for scrapping, 20 July 1945

General characteristics
- Class & type: S-1-class submarine
- Displacement: 854 long tons (868 t) surfaced; 1,062 long tons (1,079 t) submerged
- Length: 219 feet 3 inches (66.83 m)
- Beam: 20 ft 8 in (6.30 m)
- Draft: 15 ft 11 in (4.85 m)
- Installed power: 1,200 brake horsepower (895 kW) diesel; 1,500 hp (1,119 kW) electric
- Propulsion: 2 × NELSECO diesel engines; 2 × Electro-Dynamic Company electric motors; 1 × 120-cell batteries; 2 × Propellers
- Speed: 14.5 knots (26.9 km/h; 16.7 mph) surfaced; 11 kn (20 km/h; 13 mph) submerged
- Test depth: 200 ft (61 m)
- Capacity: 41,921 US gallons (158,690 L; 34,907 imp gal) fuel
- Complement: 4 officers; 34 enlisted
- Armament: 4 × 21-inch (533 mm) torpedo tubes (12 torpedoes); 1 × 3-inch (76 mm)/23-caliber deck gun (as built); 1 × 4-inch (102 mm)/50-caliber (refit)

USS S-1 (SS-105), also known as "Submarine No. 105", was the prototype of the Electric Boat Company's "Holland"-type S-class submarine of the United States Navy.

== Design ==
In the summer of 1916, The US Navy's Bureau of Construction and Repair (BuC&R) and Bureau of Steam Engineering, developed specifications for an 800 long tons (810 t) submarine that would be capable of crossing the Atlantic and fight while there. In Fiscal Year 1917 appropriations, they awarded contracts for the first three of these new boats, to be called the S-class. All were to have the same general specifications and tactical capabilities but were to be built by different manufacturers to different design types. The intent was to study the three FY-17 boats in order to eventually consolidate the best features of each into one type. However, all were intended for series production from the start, with the consolidation to come later in follow-on appropriations.

S-1 was built to an axially oriented single hull design by the Electric Boat Company, the boats that would follow this design were referred to as the S-1-class, or "Holland"-type, boats. S-2 was a double hull design with ventrally mounted control surfaces by the Lake Torpedo Boat Company, while this is referred to as the S-2-class or "Lake"-type, this design was not repeated. S-3 another double hull design, by BuC&R, and built at the government owned Portsmouth Navy Yard, the boats built to this design were referred to as the S-3-class, "Navy Yard"-type, or even "Government"-type.

== Construction ==
S-1's keel was laid down on 11 December 1917, at the Fore River Shipbuilding Company shipyard, in Quincy, Massachusetts, subcontracted by the Electric Boat Company. She was launched on 26 October 1918, sponsored by Mrs. Elizabeth Land, wife of future Vice Admiral, Commander Emory S. Land, and commissioned on 5 June 1920.

== Service history ==
=== 1920–1937 ===
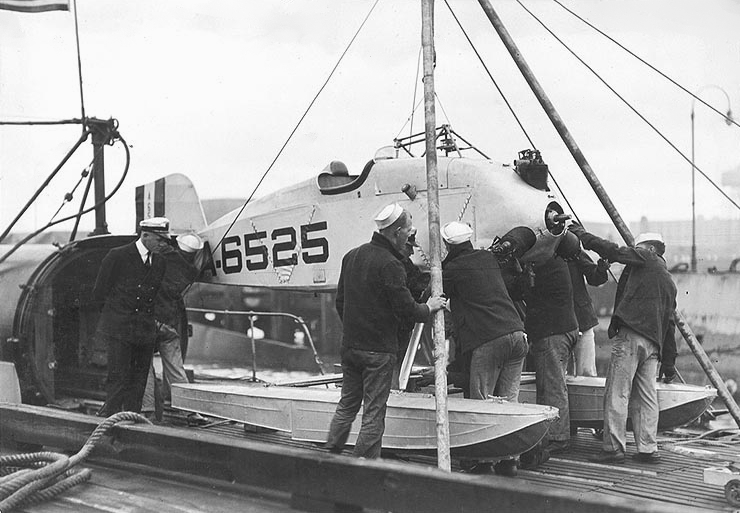
A Martin MS-1 being assembled on S-1 in 1923

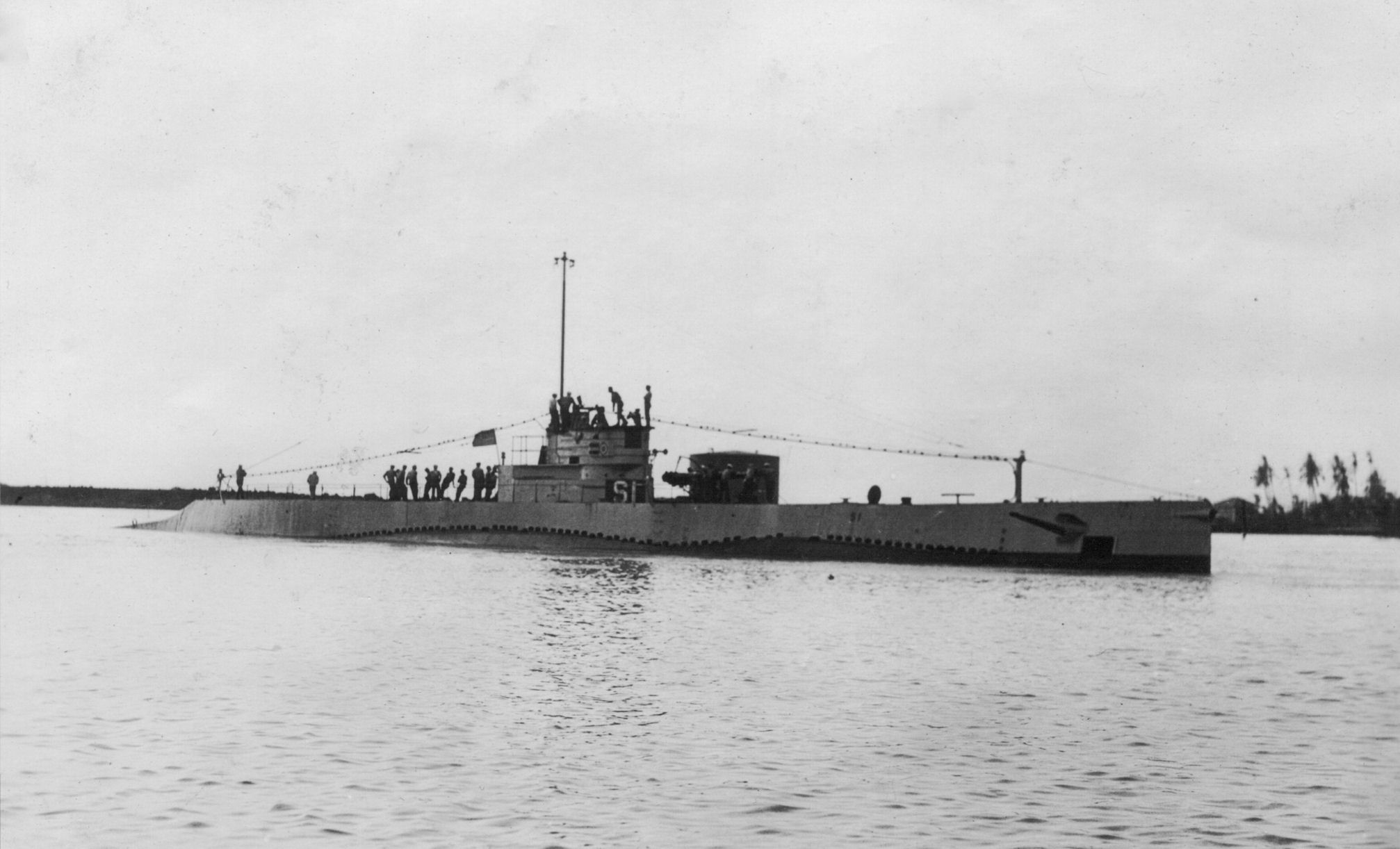
S-1 in the late 1920s, after the removal of the aircraft hangar and the installation of her 4 in (100 mm)/50 caliber gun

When the US Navy adopted its hull classification system on 17 July 1920, she received the hull number SS-105.

S-1 began her service operations in July 1920, with a cruise to Bermuda attached to Submarine Division 2 (SubDiv 2), with subsequent operations out of New London, Connecticut, cruising the New England coast until 1923.

On 2 January 1923, she shifted to SubDiv Zero, a division created for experimental work, and conducted winter maneuvers in the Caribbean Sea. As a single-ship division, SubDiv Zero, she returned to New London, in the spring to continue experimental duty.

As part of a series of studies, conducted by the United States Navy, after World War I, into the possibility of submarine-borne observation and scouting aircraft, S-1 became the experimental platform for this project late in 1923. She was altered by having a steel capsule mounted abaft the conning tower; a cylindrical pod which could house a small collapsible seaplane, the Martin MS-1. After surfacing, this plane could be rolled out, quickly assembled, and launched by ballasting the sub until the deck was awash. These experiments were carried out into 1926, using the Martin-built plane, constructed of wood and fabric, and the all-metal Cox-Klemin versions, XS-1 and XS-2. The first full cycle of surfacing, assembly, launching, retrieving, disassembly, and submergence took place on 28 July 1926, on the Thames River at New London.

Following the aircraft experiments, S-1 served as flagboat for SubDiv 2, until July 1927, when she was transferred to SubDiv 4. While attached to this division, she made operational cruises to the Panama Canal Zone in 1928–1930, during the spring months. She visited ports at Cristobal, and Coco Solo, in the Canal Zone; Cartagena, Colombia; Kingston, Jamaica; and Guantánamo Bay, Cuba, during these cruises, and spent the remaining months of those years operating along the New England coast, out of New London.

January 1931, found her at Pearl Harbor. She remained there into 1937; first, attached to SubDiv 7, SubRon 4, then, from July 1932–July 1933, attached to Rotating Reserve SubDiv 14. She was returned to SubDiv 7, in August, and remained with that division until departing in May 1937, for the Philadelphia Navy Yard. S-1 arrived at Philadelphia, on 22 July, and commenced overhaul for deactivation. She was decommissioned on 20 October 1937.

=== 1940–1942 ===
On 16 October 1940, S-1 was recommissioned at Philadelphia. She then made two cruises to Bermuda, training submariners, and returned to Philadelphia, from the second cruise on 7 December 1941. There, she prepared for transfer to Britain under the Lend-Lease program. She was decommissioned and turned over to the British, on 20 April 1942. Her name was struck from the Naval Vessel Register on 24 June 1942.

=== Royal Navy service ===
S-1 served the Royal Navy as HMS P.552, a training vessel for anti-submarine warfare. In poor condition after arriving in Durban, Natal, Union of South Africa, she was often in repair and she was declared unseaworthy in January 1944, after a collision in Durban harbor.

== Fate ==
She was returned to the US Navy, at Durban, on 16 October 1944. She was stripped of vital parts and machinery, and her hull was sold for local scrapping, on 20 July 1945, and she was scrapped there on 14 September 1945.

== Awards ==
- American Defense Service Medal
- World War II Victory Medal

== Bibliography ==
- "Table 21 - Ships on Navy List June 30, 1919". Congressional Serial Set. U.S. Government Printing Office: 770. 1921.
- Friedman, Norman (1995). U.S. Submarines Through 1945: An Illustrated Design History. Annapolis, Maryland: Naval Institute Press. ISBN 1-55750-263-3.
- Mohl, Michael. "S-1 (SS-105)". Navsource.net.
- Hall, Anne Martin (1925). Ships of the United States navy and their sponsors, 1913-1923.
- "S-1". Dictionary of American Naval Fighting Ships. Navy Department, Naval History and Heritage Command. 27 October 2016. This article incorporates text from this source, which is in the public domain.
- Johnston, David L. (October 2025). "A Visual Guide to the S-class Submarines, Part 1" (PDF) (5th ed.).
- Helgason, Gudmundur. "Allied Warships – Submarine HMS P 552 of the S-1 class". uboat.net.
