= HMS M2 (1918) =

Royal Navy submarine monitor wrecked in Lyme Bay

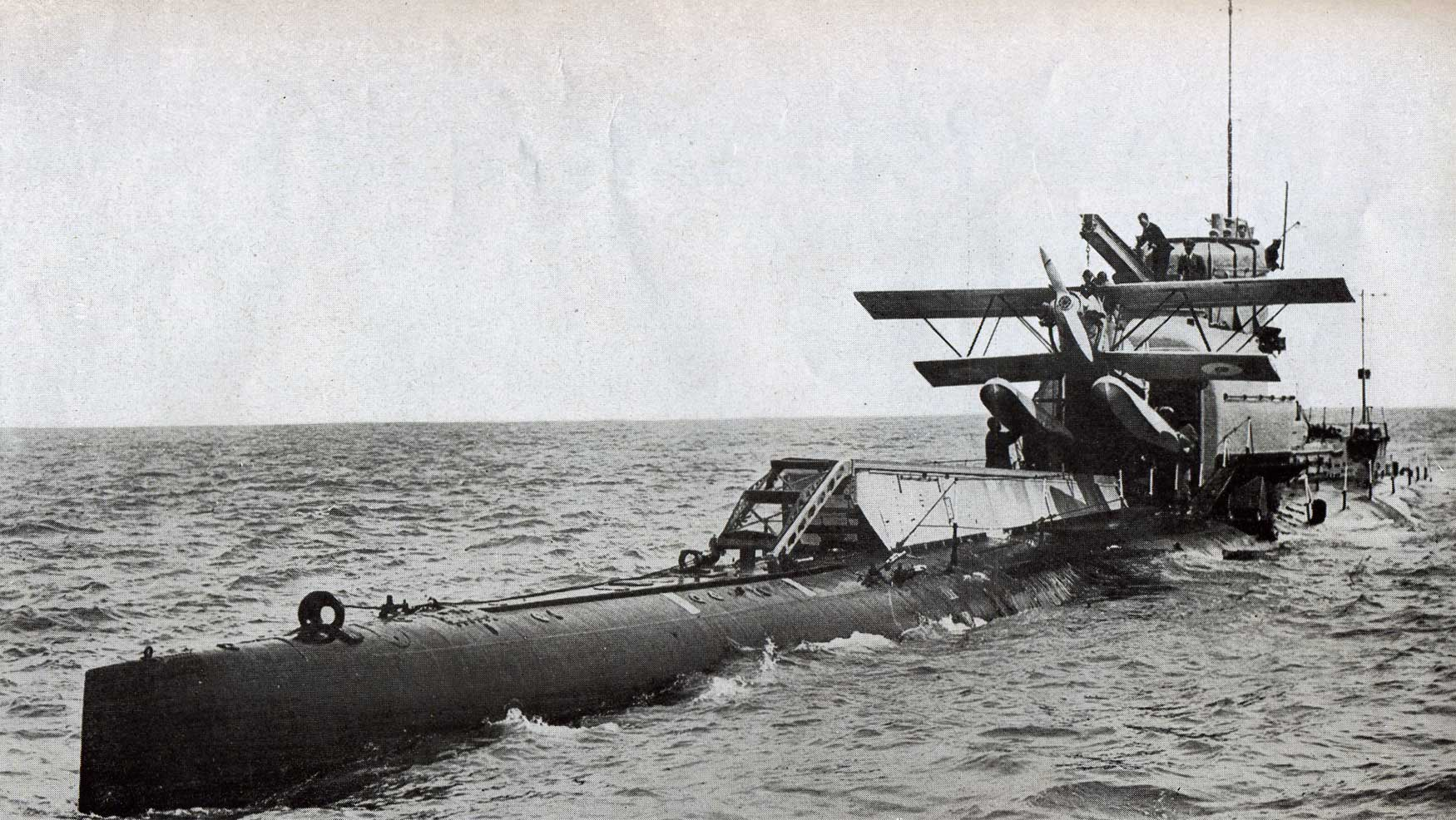
- HMS M2 retrieving her Parnall Peto seaplane.

History

United Kingdom
- Name: HMS M2
- Builder: Vickers
- Laid down: 1916
- Launched: 19 October 1918
- Fate: Sank during exercise, 26 January 1932

General characteristics
- Class & type: M-class submarine
- Displacement: 1,594 long tons (1,620 t) (surfaced); 1,946 long tons (1,977 t) (submerged)
- Length: 295 ft 9 in (90.14 m)
- Beam: 24 ft 8 in (7.52 m)
- Installed power: 2,400 hp (1,800 kW) (diesel engines); 3,200 hp (2,400 kW) (electric motors)
- Propulsion: 2 × 12-cylinder Vickers diesel engines; 4 × electric motors; 2 × 3-blade, 5 ft 10 in (1.78 m) diameter propellers
- Speed: 15 kn (17 mph; 28 km/h) (surfaced); 8–9 kn (9.2–10.4 mph; 15–17 km/h) (submerged)
- Range: 2,000 nmi (2,300 mi; 3,700 km) at 15 kn (17 mph; 28 km/h); 4,500 nmi (5,200 mi; 8,300 km) at 10 kn (12 mph; 19 km/h)
- Endurance: 80 nmi (92 mi; 150 km) at 2 kn (2.3 mph; 3.7 km/h)
- Test depth: 200 ft (61 m) - accidentally reached 239 ft (73 m) in 1923
- Complement: 62
- Armament: 1 × 12-inch (305mm)/40 cal Mark IX gun with 50 rounds (removed 1928); 1 × 3 in (76 mm) Mk II HA anti-aircraft gun; 4 × 18 inch (450 mm) bow torpedo tubes with 4 reload torpedoes
- Aircraft carried: 1 × Parnall Peto seaplane
- Aviation facilities: Hangar and Hydraulic catapult

HMS M2 was a Royal Navy submarine monitor completed in 1919, converted in 1927 into a submarine aircraft carrier. She was wrecked in Lyme Bay, Dorset, Britain, on 26 January 1932. She was one of three M-class boats completed.

== Design and career ==
Four M-class submarines replaced the order for the last four K-class submarines, K17-K21. Although they were similar in size, the M class was an entirely different design from the K class, although it is possible that some material ordered for the K-boats went into them. In any event, the end of the First World War meant that only three were completed.

M2 was laid down at Vickers shipyard at Barrow in Furness in 1916, and launched in 1918. Like the other members of her class, she was armed with a single fixed 12-inch (305mm) gun as well as torpedo tubes. The Mark IX gun was taken from spares held for the Formidable-class battleships.

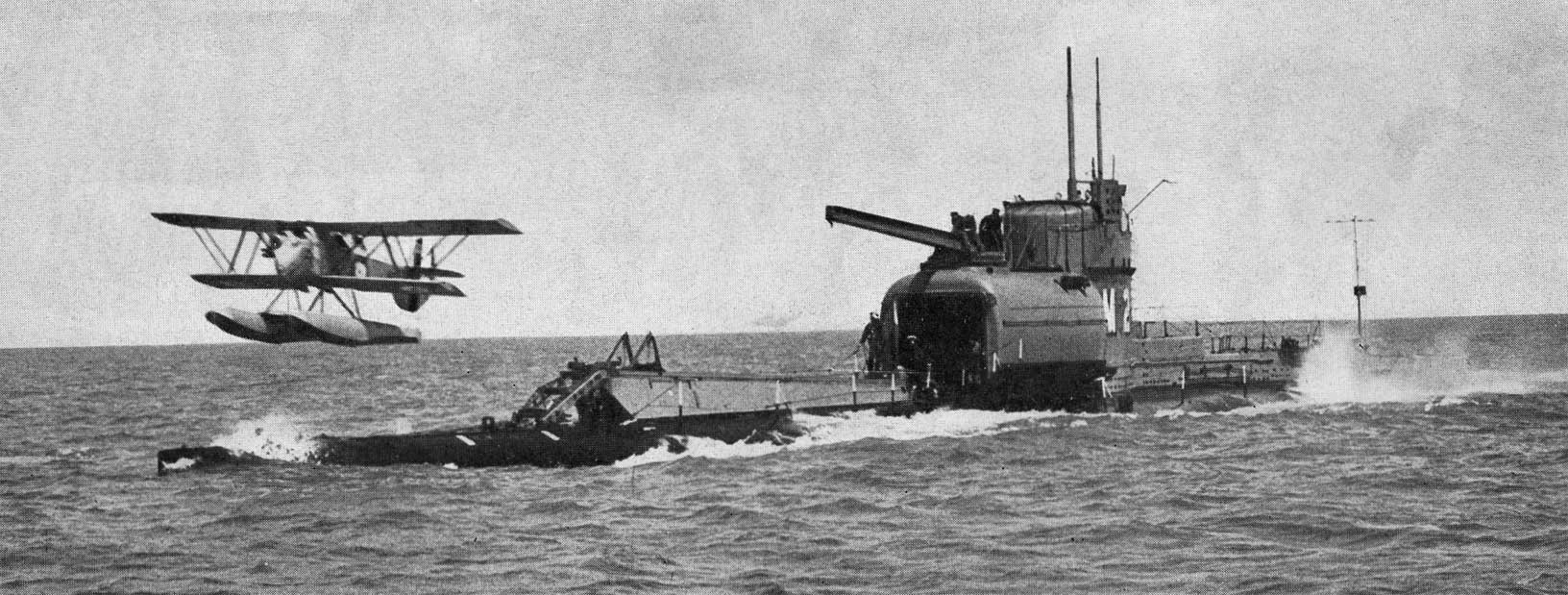
HMS M2 launching her Parnall Peto seaplane.

The M-class submarines were very large for the time at 296 feet (90 m) long. They were designed to operate as submarine monitors or cruisers. They displaced 1,600 long tons (1,626 t) on the surface and 1,950 long tons (1,981 t) when submerged. Two 12-cylinder diesel engines producing 2,400 hp (1,800 kW) drove them on the surface; underwater, they were driven by electric motors producing 1,500 hp (1,100 kW).

After the accidental sinking of M1 in 1925, M2 and her sister M3 were taken out of service and reassigned for experimental use. Her 12-inch gun was removed, replaced by a small aircraft hangar, the work being completed in 1927. This could carry a small Parnall Peto seaplane, specially designed for the M2, which, once its wings had been unfolded, could be lowered onto the sea alongside by a derrick for take off. On landing, the aircraft was hoisted back onto the deck and replaced into the hangar. In October 1928, a hydraulic aircraft catapult was fitted, to enable the seaplane to take off directly from the deck. The submarine was intended to operate ahead of the battle fleet in a reconnaissance role, flying off her unarmed seaplane as a scout.

The concept of a submarine cruiser was pursued with X1, but was not a success and was later abandoned.

== Accident ==
M2 left her base at Portland on 26 January 1932, for an exercise in West Bay, Dorset, carrying Parnall Peto serial N255. Her last communication was a radio message at 10:11 to her submarine depot ship, Titania, to announce that she would dive at 10:30. The captain of a passing merchant ship, the Newcastle coaster Tynesider, mentioned that he had seen a large submarine dive stern first at around 11:15. Unaware of the significance of this, he only reported it in passing once he reached port.

Her entire crew of 60 was killed in the accident. The submarine was found on 3 February, eight days after her loss. Ernest Cox, the salvage expert who had raised the German battleships at Scapa Flow, was hired to salvage the M2. In an operation lasting nearly a year and 1,500 dives, on 8 December 1932, she was lifted to within 20 ft (6 m) of the surface before a gale sprang up, sending her down to her final resting place.

The hangar door was found open and the aircraft still in it. The accident was believed to be due to water entering the submarine through the hangar door, which had been opened to launch the aircraft shortly after surfacing.

Two explanations have been advanced;

The first is that since the crew were always trying to beat their record time for launching the aircraft, they had opened the hangar door on surfacing while the deck was still awash.

The other theory is that the flooding of the hangar was due to failure of the stern hydroplanes. High pressure air tanks were used to bring the boat to the surface in an awash condition, but to conserve compressed air, compressors were then started to completely clear the ballast tanks of water by blowing air into them. This could take as long as 15 minutes to complete. The normal procedure for launching the aircraft was therefore to hold the boat on the surface using the hydroplanes whilst the hangar door was opened and the aircraft launched. Failure of the stern hydroplanes would have sent the stern down as observed by the merchant officers and water would have eventually entered the hangar.

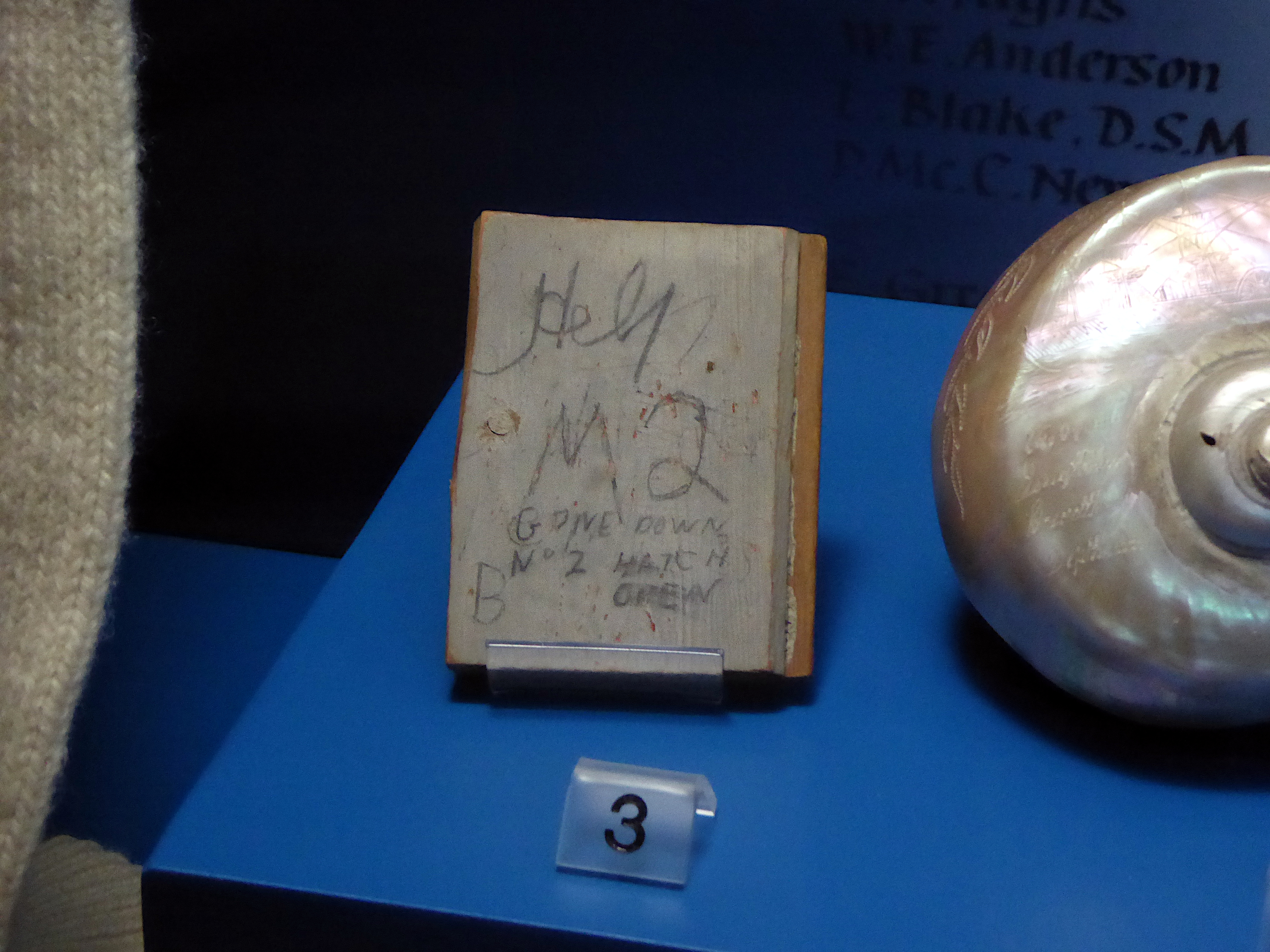
The help message from M2, written in pencil on a small piece of wood, on display at the Royal Navy Submarine Museum.

On 25 February 1932, a help message from M2, written in pencil on a small piece of wood, was discovered by a fisherman on the shore at Hallsands, south Devon. It read: "Help. M2 gone down. No. 2 hatch open.", with "Help. Lieut." on the back. It was handed over to the naval authorities and is now on display at the Royal Navy Submarine Museum in Gosport.

== Aftermath ==
The submarine currently lies upright on the sea bed at (50°34.6′N 2°33.93′W). Her keel is about 100 ft (30 m) below the surface at low tide, and her highest point at the top of the conning tower at around 66 ft (20 m). She is a popular dive for scuba divers. The wreck is designated as a "protected place" under the Protection of Military Remains Act 1986.

After the loss of M2, the Royal Navy abandoned submarine-launched aircraft, although other navies experimented with the concept in the inter-war years and with Japan producing some 42 submarine aircraft carriers both before and during the Second World War.

== See also ==
- I-400-class submarine

== Bibliography ==
- McCartney, Innes (2002). Lost patrols : submarine wrecks of the English Channel. Penzance: Periscope. ISBN 978-1-90438-104-4.
- Brown, D.K. (2003) The Grand Fleet: Warship Design and Development 1906-1922, London: Caxton Editions, ISBN 1-84067-531-4
- Treadwell, T.C. (1999) Strike from beneath the Sea: a history of aircraft-carrying submarines, Stroud, UK: Tempus Publishing. ISBN 0-7524-1704-5
- "SI 2008/0950: Designation under the Protection of Military Remains Act". opsi.gov.uk.
