= List of submarine-borne aircraft =

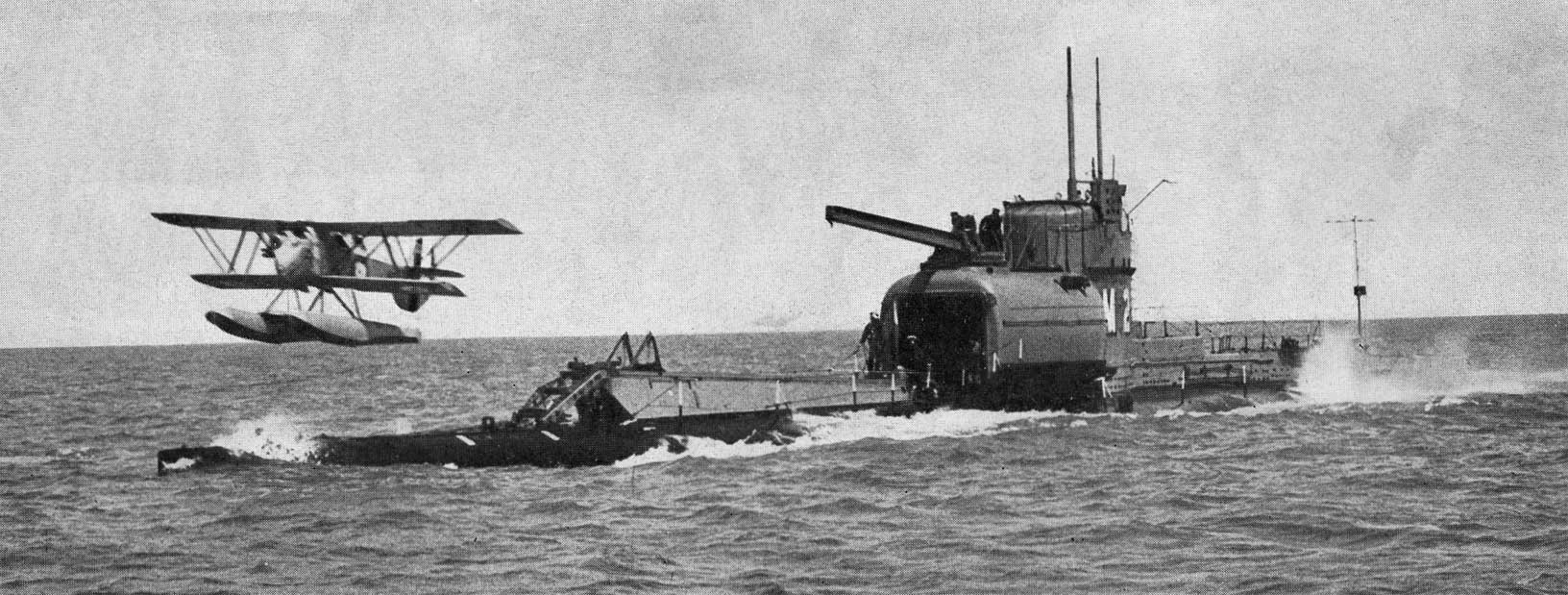
A seaplane launching from British submarine HMS M2.

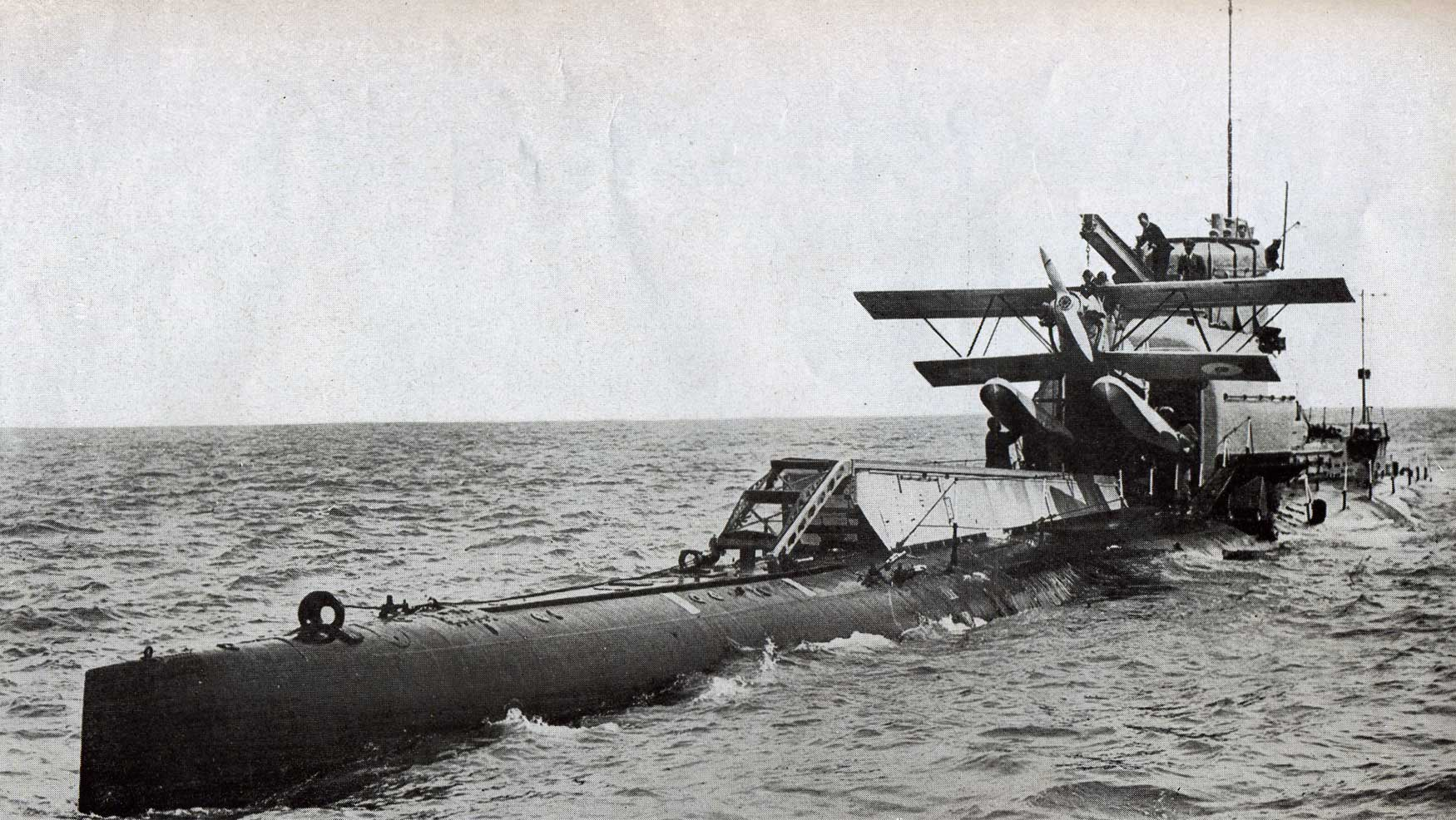
HMS M2 retrieving her seaplane

This is a list of aircraft carried undersea and used from submarines (see Submarine aircraft carriers).

These were primarily used during the Second World War, also included for comparison are earlier developments of submarine carried aircraft from the First World War and the period between the World Wars.

Name	Country	Class	Type	Role	Date	Status	Total	Notes
Aichi M6A Seiran	Japan	Propeller	portable monoplane floatplane	dive bomber / torpedo bomber	1945	Production	28	Could be launched without floats
Arado Ar 231	Germany	Propeller	portable monoplane floatplane	reconnaissance	1941	Production	6	
Bristol-Burney X.1,2,3	UK	Propeller	flying hydrofoil	experimental aircraft	1912–14	Prototypes	3	
Caspar-Heinkel U-1	USA / Germany	Propeller	dismantlable biplane	reconnaissance	1922	Prototypes	3	
Chyetverikov SPL	USSR	Propeller	folding monoplane flying boat	reconnaissance	1934	Prototypes	2	
Cox-Klemin XS-1, XS-2	USA	Propeller	portable biplane floatplane	experimental aircraft / reconnaissance	1923	Prototypes	6	derived into the Martin MS
Focke-Achgelis Fa 330 "Bachstelze"	Germany	Rotorcraft	portable rotor kite	observation	1942	Production	200	
Flettner Fl 282A-2 "Kolibri"	Germany	Rotorcraft	dismantlable helicopter	reconnaissance	-	Project	0	
Friedrichshafen FF.29	Germany	Propeller	biplane floatplane	reconnaissance	1914	Production	49	Normal seaplane carried externally (only 1 plane ever used)
Hansa Brandenburg W.20	Germany	Propeller	portable biplane flying boat	reconnaissance	1918	Prototypes	3	
Loening XSL-1/2	USA	Propeller	portable monoplane flying boat	reconnaissance	1931	Prototype	1	1 prototype re-engined
LFG Stralsund V 19 Putbus	Germany	Propeller	dismantlable monoplane floatplane	reconnaissance	1918	Prototype	1	
Macchi M.53	Italy	Propeller	dismantlable monoplane floatplane	reconnaissance	1928	Prototype	1	
Martin MS-1	USA	Propeller	dismantlable biplane floatplane	reconnaissance	1923	Production	6	
Parnall-Peto	UK	Propeller	dismantlable biplane floatplane	reconnaissance	1925	Prototypes	2	
Piaggio P.8	Italy	Propeller	dismantlable monoplane floatplane	reconnaissance	1928	Prototype	1	
Sopwith Schneider	UK	Propeller	biplane floatplane	experimental trial / reconnaissance	1914	Prototype	1	Modified example
Watanabe E9W	Japan	Propeller	portable biplane floatplane	reconnaissance	1938	Production	35	
Yokosuka E14Y	Japan	Propeller	portable monoplane floatplane	reconnaissance	1941	Production	126	
Yokosuka E6Y	Japan	Propeller	portable biplane floatplane	reconnaissance	1933	Production	10	
Mureaux Besson MB-411	France	Propeller	portable monoplane floatplane	reconnaissance	1935	Production	2	Nammed "Passe-partout"

== See also ==
- Index of aviation articles

== Bibliography ==
- Francillon, René J. Japanese Aircraft of the Pacific War. London: Putnam & Company Ltd., 1970. ISBN 0-370-00033-1 (2nd edition 1979, ISBN 0-370-30251-6).
- Januszewski, Tadeusz. Japanese Submarine Aircraft. Sandomierz, Poland/Redbourn, UK: Mushroom Model Publications, 2002. ISBN 83-916327-2-5.
- Barnes, C.H. Bristol Aircraft Since 1910 London: Putnam, 1988 (3rd ed.) ISBN 0-85177-823-2
