= Hansa-Brandenburg W.20 =

W.20
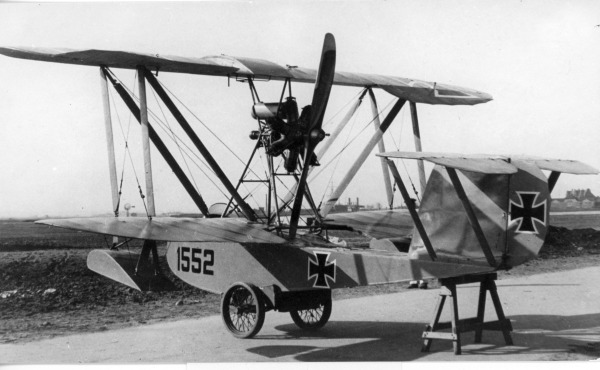

General information
- Type: Submarine-launched reconnaissance flying boat
- National origin: Germany
- Manufacturer: Hansa-Brandenburg
- Number built: 3

The Hansa-Brandenburg W.20 was an experimental submarine-launched maritime reconnaissance flying boat designed by the Hansa-Brandenburg Aircraft Company (Hansa Brandenburgische Flugzeugwerke) for the Imperial German Navy's (Kaiserliche Marine) Naval Air Service (Marine-Fliegerabteilung) during World War I. Three prototypes were completed in 1918, but the W.20 was not put into production.

== Design and development ==
Due to the need to be stored and launched from a submarine aircraft carrier, the W.20 was a small single-seat, pusher configuration, biplane flying boat that was designed to be assembled and dismantled quickly. It was powered by a seven-cylinder, 80-metric-horsepower (59 kW) Oberursel U.0 rotary engine mounted on struts between the wings driving a two-bladed propeller. The pilot had an open cockpit just forward of the lower wing. Stabilising floats were fitted on the lower wings. The W.20 was unarmed.

Three prototypes were ordered on 30 April 1917 as well as a full-scale mockup to test the aircraft's ability to fit within the 20 ft × 6 ft (6.1 m × 1.8 m) cylinder that was going to be mounted on top of the submarine's hull. The prototypes were built using the company's standard wooden fuselage and fabric-covered wooden wings to prove the feasibility of the concept, but production aircraft were intended to be of all-metal construction. The initial design of the structure supporting the upper wings proved too weak and the first prototype was severely damaged in October 1917. Additional interplane struts connecting the upper wings with the lower ones had to be added and the existing struts were strengthened. In addition, the wings were lengthened. The second prototype was fitted with these modifications and delivered in March 1918 to the Seaplane Experimental Command (Seeflugzeug-Versuchs-Kommando) and flight tested the following month. It could not complete the trials, but it was accepted by the Naval Air Service anyway. After the required modifications and repairs were made to the aircraft, all three were sent into storage at Warnemünde. All three W.20s were found at Hage when the Allies inspected the German seaplane bases in December 1918. Their ultimate fate is unknown, but it is likely that they were scrapped.

== Specifications (2nd prototype) ==
Data from Hansa-Brandenburg Aircraft of WWI: Volume 2–Biplane Seaplanes. A Centennial Perspective on Great War Airplanes; German Aircraft of the First World War

General characteristics

- Crew: 1
- Length: 5.925 m (19 ft 5 in)
- Upper wingspan: 6.8 m (22 ft 4 in)
- Lower wingspan: 6.4 m (21 ft 0 in)
- Height: 2.9 m (9 ft 6 in)
- Wing area: 15.82 m^{2} (170.3 sq ft)
- Empty weight: 396 kg (873 lb)
- Gross weight: 567 kg (1,250 lb)
- Powerplant: 1 × Oberursel U.0 air-cooled rotary engine, 60 kW (80 hp)
- Propellers: 2-bladed fixed-pitch

Performance

- Maximum speed: 117 km/h (73 mph, 63 kn)
- Time to altitude: 11.4 minutes to 800 m (2,600 ft)
- 14.9 minutes to 1,000 m (3,300 ft)

== See also ==
Related development

- LFG Stralsund V 19 Putbus

Related lists

- List of submarine-borne aircraft
- List of flying boats and floatplanes

== Bibliography ==
- Andersson, Lennart & Sanger, Ray (2014). Retribution and Recovery: German Aircraft and Aviation 1919 to 1922. Air-Britain (Historians). ISBN 978-0-85130-467-0.
- Clouts, Walter; Gregoire, Daniel; Layman, R. D. & Scurrell, Charles E. (1991). "Question 42/89". Warship International. XXVIII (1): 84–86. ISSN 0043-0374.
- Gray, Peter & Thetford, Owen (1987) [1970]. German Aircraft of the First World War (2nd ed.). Putnam. ISBN 0-85177-809-7.
- Owers, Colin A. (2015). Hansa-Brandenburg Aircraft of WWI: Volume 2–Biplane Seaplanes. Great War Aviation Centennial Series. Vol. 18. Aeronaut Books. ISBN 978-1-935881-32-2.
- Passingham, Malcolm (February 2000). "Les hydravions embarqués sur sous-marins" [Submarine-carried Seaplanes]. Avions: Toute l'aéronautique et son histoire (in French) (83): 7–17. ISSN 1243-8650.
- Treadwell, Terry C. (1999). Strike from Beneath the Sea: A History of Aircraft-carrying Submarines. Tempus Publishing. ISBN 0-7524-1704-5.
