= Caspar U.1 =

Submarine-launched floatplane

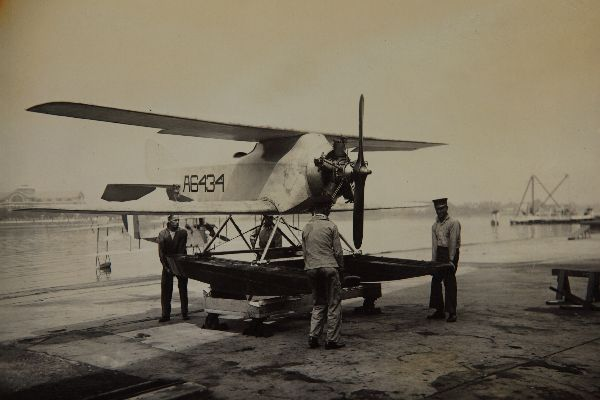
- Caspar U.1 under test by the U.S. Navy

General information
- Type: Submarine-launched patrol seaplane
- National origin: Germany
- Manufacturer: Caspar-Werke
- Designer: Ernst Heinkel
- Primary user: Reichsmarine
- Number built: 3

History
- First flight: 1922

The Caspar U.1 (also referred to as the Caspar-Heinkel U.1) was a German patrol floatplane of the 1920s, designed by Ernst Heinkel and built by Caspar-Werke. It was intended to be disassembled and stored inside a cylindrical container for transport aboard a submarine, from which it could be quickly assembled and launched.

== Development ==
The U.1 was designed to meet a requirement for an aircraft that could be stored inside a cylindrical container 7.40 metres (24.3 ft) long with a diameter of 1.70 m (5 ft 7 in); this would allow it to be carried aboard a submarine. To reduce the time needed for assembly and launch, it was built as a cantilever biplane, eliminating the need to rig struts and wires during erection. The aircraft was fitted with two single-step floats and powered by a front-mounted 55 horsepower (41 kW) Siemens radial piston engine. The pilot sat in an open cockpit positioned behind the upper wing, providing an unobstructed forward view. It was claimed that, during tests, four men were able to remove the U.1 from its container and assemble it in just 1 minute and 3 seconds.

Two aircraft were purchased by the United States Navy for evaluation. They were delivered to Naval Air Station Anacostia in late 1922 and tested during 1923. One of the aircraft was damaged beyond repair while mounted on a truck for a parade.

== Operators ==
Germany

- Reichsmarine

United States

- United States Navy

== Specifications ==
Data from Flight, June 1923

General characteristics

- Crew: Two
- Length: 6.20 m (20 ft 4 in)
- Wingspan: 7.80 m (25 ft 7 in)
- Height: 2.34 m (7 ft 8 in)
- Wing area: 14 m^{2} (150 sq ft)
- Empty weight: 360 kg (794 lb)
- Gross weight: 510 kg (1,124 lb)
- Powerplant: 1 × Siemens 5-cylinder radial engine, 37 kW (50 hp)
- Propellers: 2-bladed

Performance

- Maximum speed: 145 km/h (90 mph, 78 kn)
- Cruise speed: 121 km/h (75 mph, 65 kn)
- Time to altitude: 7 mins to 1,000 m (3,300 ft)
- Landing speed: 75 km/h (47 mph; 40 kn)

== See also ==
Aircraft of comparable role, configuration, and era

- Cox-Klemin XS
- Parnall Peto
- Martin MS
- Yokosuka E6Y

Related lists

- List of United States Navy aircraft designations (pre-1962)
- List of flying boats and floatplanes
- List of submarine-borne aircraft
