= Junsen type submarine =

1926 class of Japanese submarines

Class overview
- Name: Junsen type submarines
- Builders: Kure Naval Arsenal; Kawasaki Shipbuilding
- Operators: Imperial Japanese Navy
- Preceded by: Kaidai Type
- Succeeded by: Type A submarine; Type B submarine; Type C submarine
- Subclasses: Junsen I (I-1 class); Junsen I Modified (I-5 class); Junsen II (I-6 class); Junsen III (I-7 class)
- Built: 1923-1938
- In commission: 1926-1945

The Junsen Type Submarine (巡潜型潜水艦, Junsen-gata sensuikan) was a ship class of "cruiser submarines" of the Imperial Japanese Navy (IJN). There were four submarine designs of the Junsen type: J1, a modified J1, J2 and the J3. "Junsen" is the abbreviation of "cruiser submarine" (巡洋潜水艦, Jun'yō sensuikan).

== Class variants ==
The Junsen type submarines were divided into four subtypes:

- Junsen I (巡潜一型（伊一型）, Junsen 1-gata, I-1-class)
- Junsen I Mod. (巡潜一型改（伊五型）, Junsen 1-gata Kai, I-5-class)
- Junsen II (巡潜二型（伊六型）, Junsen 2-gata, I-6-class)
- Junsen III (巡潜三型（伊七型）, Junsen 3-gata, I-7-class).

=== Junsen I (I-1 class) ===
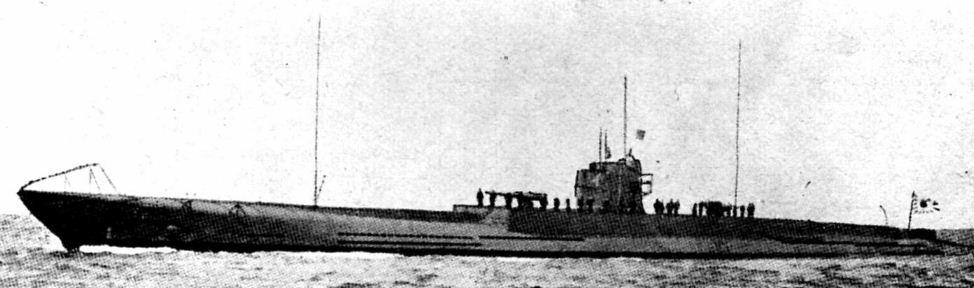
I-1 in 1930

Four boats were built in 1923-1929. Genealogy of the large-size submarine in the IJN began with U-142. Japan received six U-boats from Germany as reparations of World War I. The IJN copied U-125, one of the six, producing the I-21-class minelayer submarine. The IJN could not find an optimal design of fleet submarine, so they and Kawasaki Heavy Industries sent many technical officers to the United Kingdom and Germany and got drawings of advanced submarines. The British L class became the Kaidai I, the K class became the Kaidai II, and U-142 became Junsen I.

Boat	Builder	Laid down	Launched	Completed	Results	Fate
I-1	Kawasaki Shipbuilding	12-03-1923	15-10-1924	10-03-1926	Damaged USS Hulbert 31-12-1941; Sank Dutch merchant ship Siantar 03-03-1942	Sunk by HMNZS Moa and HMNZS Kiwi at Guadalcanal 29-01-1943.
I-2	Kawasaki Shipbuilding	06-08-1923	23-02-1925	24-07-1926	Sank Dutch merchant ship Parigi 01-03-1942; Sank RMS Chilka 11-03-1942	Sunk by USS Saufley north of Rabaul 02°17′S 149°14′E 07-04-1944.
I-3	Kawasaki Shipbuilding	01-11-1924	08-06-1925	30-11-1926	Sank RMS Elmdale 07-04-1942; Sank RMS Fultala 08-04-1942	Sunk by USS PT-59 at Kamimbo 09-12-1942.
I-4	Kawasaki Shipbuilding	17-04-1926	22-05-1928	24-12-1929	Sank Norwegian merchant ship Hoegh Merchant 14-12-1941; Sank Dutch merchant ship Ban Ho Guan 28-02-1942; Sank USS Washingtonian 06-04-1942; Damaged unknown sailing boat 10-04-1942; Damaged USS Alhena 27-09-1942	Sunk by USS Seadragon southeast of Rabaul 05°02′S 152°33′E 20-12-1942.

=== Junsen I Mod (I-5 class) ===
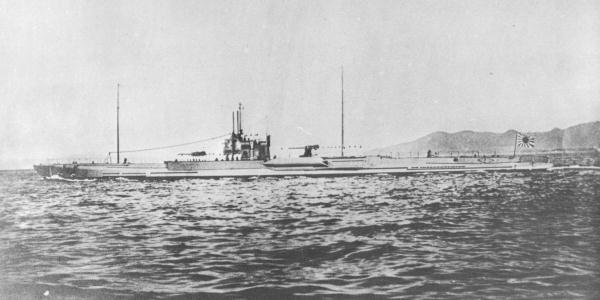
I-5 in 1932

This is a type which added a floatplane to the Junsen I.

Boat	Builder	Laid down	Launched	Completed	Results	Fate
I-5	Kawasaki Shipbuilding	30-10-1929	19-06-1931	31-07-1932		Sunk by USS Wyman east of Saipan 13°01′N 151°58′E 19-07-1944.

=== Junsen II (I-6 class) ===
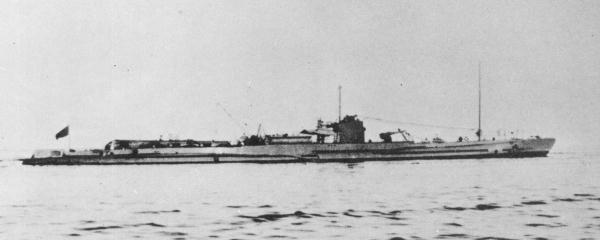
I-6 in 1935

Project number S32. This is a type which added a catapult to the Junsen I Mod. She was built in 1931 under the 1st Naval Armaments Supplement Programme (Maru 1).

Boat	Builder	Laid down	Launched	Completed	Results	Fate
I-6	Kawasaki-Kōbe Shipyard	14 October 1932	31 March 1934	15 May 1935	Damaged aircraft carrier USS Saratoga 11 January 1942; Sank Clan Line cargo ship SS Clan Ross 2 April 1942; Sank RMS Bahadar 7 April 1942; Sank two unknown sailing boats 10 April 1942	Accidentally rammed, attacked and sunk by Toyokawa Maru northeast of Hachijo-Shima on 16 June 1944.

=== Junsen III (I-7 class) ===
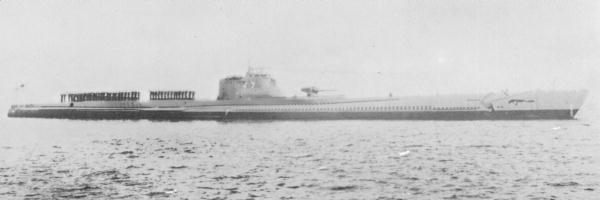
I-7 in 1937

Project number S33. These boats combined the good points of the Junsen II and the Kaidai V. They were built in 1934 under the Maru 2 Programme. Junsen III became a 'typeship' for the Type-A, B and C.

Boat	Builder	Laid down	Launched	Completed	Results	Fate
I-7	Kure Naval Arsenal	12 September 1934	3 July 1935	31 March 1937	Sank Dutch merchant ship Le Maire 04-03-1942; Sank RMS Glenshiel 03-04-1942; Sank USS Arcata 15-07-1942	Damaged by USS Monaghan at Kiska 21 June 1943. Scuttled 5 July 1943.
I-8	Kawasaki-Kōbe Shipyard	11-10-1934	20-07-1936	05-12-1938	Sank Dutch merchant ship Tjisalak 26-03-1944; Sank RMS City of Adelaide 30-03-1944; Sank Australian merchant ship Nellore 29-06-1944; Sank USS Jean Nicolet 02-07-1944	Sunk by USS Stockton southeast of Okinawa Island 25°29′N 128°35′E 31-03-1945.

== Characteristics ==
Type		Junsen I (I-1)	Junsen I Mod. (I-5)	Junsen II (I-6)	Junsen III (I-7)
Displacement	Surfaced	1,970 long tons (2,002 t)	same as Junsen I	1,900 long tons (1,930 t)	2,231 long tons (2,267 t)
Displacement	Submerged	2,791 long tons (2,836 t)	same as Junsen I	3,061 long tons (3,110 t)	3,583 long tons (3,640 t)
Length (overall)		97.50 m (319 ft 11 in)	same as Junsen I	98.50 m (323 ft 2 in)	109.30 m (358 ft 7 in)
Beam		9.22 m (30 ft 3 in)	same as Junsen I	9.06 m (29 ft 9 in)	9.10 m (29 ft 10 in)
Draft		4.94 m (16 ft 2 in)	same as Junsen I	5.31 m (17 ft 5 in)	5.26 m (17 ft 3 in)
Depth		7.58 m (24 ft 10 in)	same as Junsen I	7.58 m (24 ft 10 in)	7.70 m (25 ft 3 in)
Power plant and shaft		2 × Rauschenbach Mk.2 diesels 2 shafts	same as Junsen I	2 × Kampon Mk.1A Model 7 diesels 2 shafts	2 × Kampon Mk.1A Model 10 diesels 2 shafts
Power	Surfaced	6,000 bhp	same as Junsen I	8,000 bhp	11,200 bhp
Power	Submerged	2,600 shp	same as Junsen I	2,600 shp	2,800 shp
Speed	Surfaced	18.8 knots (34.8 km/h)	same as Junsen I	20.0 knots (37.0 km/h)	23.0 knots (42.6 km/h)
Speed	Submerged	8.1 knots (15.0 km/h)	same as Junsen I	7.5 knots (13.9 km/h)	8.0 knots (14.8 km/h)
Range	Surfaced	24,400 nmi (45,200 km) at 10 knots (19 km/h)	same as Junsen I	20,000 nmi (37,000 km) at 10 knots (19 km/h)	14,000 nmi (26,000 km) at 16 knots (30 km/h)
Range	Submerged	60 nmi (110 km) at 3 knots (5.6 km/h)	same as Junsen I	65 nmi (120 km) at 3 knots (5.6 km/h)	80 nmi (150 km) at 3 knots (5.6 km/h)
Test depth		75 m (246 ft)	same as Junsen I	80 m (260 ft)	100 m (330 ft)
Fuel		545 tons	580 tons	580 tons	800 tons
Complement		75	75	80	100
Armament (initial)		• 6 × 533 mm (21 in) torpedo tubes (4 × bow, 2 × aft) • 22 × Type 89 torpedoes • 2 × 140 mm (5.5 in) L/40 11th Year Type Naval guns • 1 × 7.7 mm machine gun	• 6 × 533 mm (21 in) torpedo tubes (4 × bow, 2 × aft) • 20 × Type 89 torpedoes • 2 × 127 mm (5.0 in) L/40 Type 88 AA guns • 1 × 7.7 mm machine gun	• 6 × 533 mm (21 in) torpedo tubes (4 × bow, 2 × aft) • 17 × Type 89 torpedoes • 1 × 127 mm (5.0 in) L/40 Type 88 AA gun • 1 × 13.2 mm (0.52 in) AA gun	• 6 × 533 mm (21 in) torpedo tubes (6 × bow) • 20 × Type 89 torpedoes • 2 × 140 mm L/40 11th Year Type Naval guns • 2 × 13 mm AA guns
Aircraft and facilities			• Hangar • 1 × Yokosuka E6Y1	• Catapult and hangar • 1 × Yokosuka E6Y1	• Catapult and hangar • 1 × Watanabe E9W1

== Bibliography ==
- "Rekishi Gunzō"., History of Pacific War Vol.17 I-Gō Submarines, Gakken (Japan), January 1998, ISBN 4-05-601767-0
- Rekishi Gunzō, History of Pacific War Extra, "Perfect guide, The submarines of the Imperial Japanese Forces", Gakken (Japan), March 2005, ISBN 4-05-603890-2
- Model Art Extra No.537, Drawings of Imperial Japanese Naval Vessels Part-3, Model Art Co. Ltd. (Japan), May 1999, Book code 08734-5
- The Maru Special, Japanese Naval Vessels No.31 Japanese Submarines I, Ushio Shobō (Japan), September 1979, Book code 68343-31
