= Cox-Klemin XS =

XS
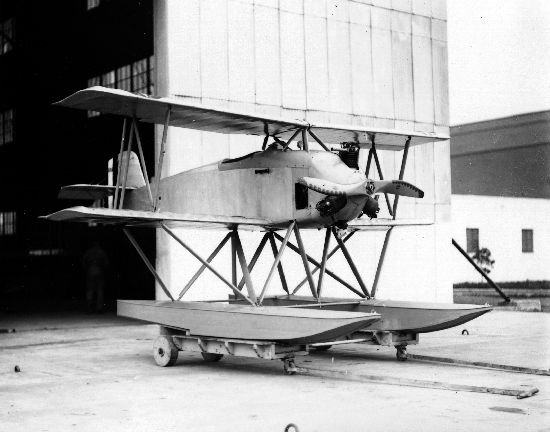
- XS-1

General information
- Type: Submarine-operated scout biplane
- Manufacturer: Cox-Klemin Aircraft Corporation
- Designer: U.S. Navy Bureau of Aeronautics
- Status: Out of service/scrapped
- Primary user: United States Navy
- Number built: 12

History
- Introduction date: 1923
- First flight: 1922
- Retired: 1926

The Cox-Klemin XS was a 1920s American experimental scout biplane, the first aircraft to be both launched and recovered from a submarine.

== Development ==
In 1921, representatives from the U.S. Navy Bureau of Aeronautics observed tests of the small M-1 Messenger for the United States Army Air Service and became interested in the use of small scouting aircraft aboard submarines. The Bureau consequently designed a tiny single seat scout airplane that could be disassembled and reassembled quickly. An innovative step was replacing the traditional wire bracing of the biplane wing with solid struts, thus avoiding tedious and time consuming rigging work during reassembly. After surfacing, this plane would be rolled out of a watertight hangar cylinder and quickly assembled. It was planned to launch the seaplane by ballasting the submarine until the deck was awash. Instead of building the aircraft itself at the Naval Aircraft Factory the Bureau let two contracts to build the aircraft to two slightly different designs. One contract went to The Martin Company for the MS-1, constructed with an aluminum frame and floats but with a fabric covered fuselage. The U.S. Navy also contracted the Cox-Klemin Aircraft Corporation to build six aircraft (Bureau Nos. A6515-A6520) designated XS-1. The aircraft were of wood frame and fabric construction and were powered by a 60-horsepower (45 kW) Lawrance L-4 radial engine. One aircraft (Bureau No. A6519) was re-engined in 1923 with a Kinner engine and re-designated XS-2.

== Operational history ==
The submarine USS S-1 became the experimental platform for this project late in 1923. The XS-1, XS-2 and the Martin MS-1 were used for the trials mounted in a horizontal cylindrical hangar behind the conning tower fairwater. After surfacing the aircraft could be rolled out and assembled, it was then launched ballasting the sub until the aft deck was awash. The first full cycle of surfacing, assembly, launching, retrieving, disassembly, and submergence took place on 28 July 1926, on the Thames River at New London, Connecticut, using the XS-2.

Testing showed that it took an inordinate amount of time to conduct a launching cycle (making the submarine vulnerable to enemy attack), and the cycle could only be safely conducted in very calm seas. The limited range and capability of the aircraft itself, due to its small size, greatly restricted the tactical utility of the concept. After further trials during 1926 all the experimental aircraft were scrapped.

== Variants ==
XS-1
Lawrance L-4 powered scout biplane, six built
XS-2
One XS-1 modified with a Kinner B-5 engine.
Martin MS-1
Six similar aircraft built by The Martin Company.

== Operators ==
United States

- United States Navy

== Specifications (XS-2) ==
Data from

General characteristics

- Crew: 1
- Length: 18 ft 2 in (5.54 m)
- Wingspan: 18 ft 0 in (5.49 m)
- Height: 8 ft 0 in (2.44 m)
- Gross weight: 1,050 lb (476 kg)
- Powerplant: 1 × Kinner B-5 5-cyl. air-cooled radial piston engine, 85 hp (63 kW)

Performance

- Maximum speed: 115 mph (185 km/h, 100 kn)
- Service ceiling: 11,300 ft (3,400 m)

== See also ==
Aircraft of comparable role, configuration, and era

- Caspar U.1
- Parnall Peto
- Martin MS

Related lists

- List of United States Navy aircraft designations (pre-1962)
- List of submarine-borne aircraft

== Bibliography ==
- Swanborough, Gordon, and Bowers, Peter M. United States Navy Aircraft Since 1911, 2nd Edition. Naval Institute Press, 1976. ISBN 0-87021-968-5
- Passingham, Malcolm (February 2000). "Les hydravions embarqués sur sous-marins" [Submarine-carried Seaplanes]. Avions: Toute l'aéronautique et son histoire (in French) (83): 7–17. ISSN 1243-8650.
