= Martin MS =

Experimental scout biplane of the US Navy

MS-1
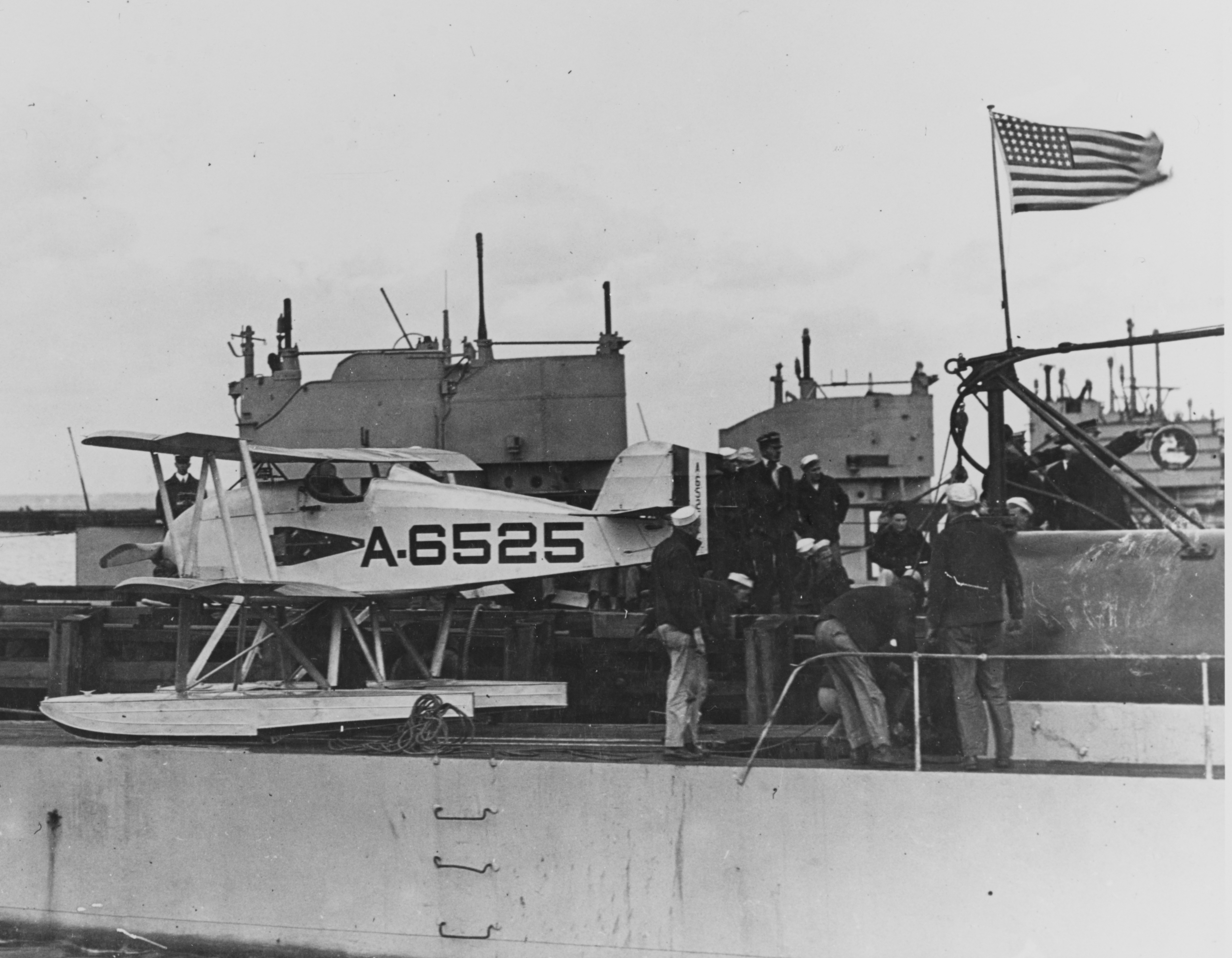
- A Martin MS-1 on the submarine USS S-1 in 1923.

General information
- Type: Submarine-operated scout biplane
- Manufacturer: The Martin Company
- Designer: U.S. Navy Bureau of Aeronautics
- Status: Out of service/scrapped
- Primary user: United States Navy
- Number built: 6

History
- Introduction date: 1923
- First flight: 1922
- Retired: 1926

The Martin MS-1 was an experimental scout biplane ordered by the United States Navy and was intended to operate from a submarine. It first flew in 1923 and the type was used for tests until 1926 when the project was cancelled.

== Development ==
In 1921, representatives from the U.S. Navy Bureau of Aeronautics observed tests of the small M-1 Messenger for the United States Army Air Service and became interested in the use of small scouting aircraft aboard submarines. The Bureau consequently designed a tiny single seat scout airplane that could be disassembled and reassembled quickly. An innovative step was replacing the traditional wire bracing of the biplane wing with solid struts, thus avoiding tedious and time consuming rigging work during reassembly. After surfacing, this plane would be rolled out of a watertight hangar cylinder and quickly assembled. It was planned to launch the seaplane by ballasting the submarine until the deck was awash. Instead of building the aircraft itself at the Naval Aircraft Factory the Bureau let two contracts to build the aircraft to two slightly different designs. One contract went to The Martin Company for the MS-1, constructed with an aluminum frame and floats but with a fabric covered fuselage. The other contract went to the Cox-Klemin Aircraft Corporation for the wood frame and fabric Cox-Klemin XS. Other than the internal framework, both aircraft were virtually identical.

== Operational history ==
The submarine S-1 became the experimental platform for the operation of scout seaplanes late in 1923. The MS-1 and the Cox-Klemin XS were used for the trials, stored in a horizontal cylindrical hangar behind the conning tower fairwater. The first successful attempt was made on 5 November 1923. The first full cycle of surfacing, assembly, launching, retrieving, disassembly, and submergence took place on 28 July 1926, on the Thames River at New London, Connecticut using the XS-2.

A total of six Martin MS-1s were built, with all six still being listed with the U.S. Navy as late as 1926. Testing showed that it took an inordinate amount of time to conduct a launching cycle (making the submarine vulnerable to enemy attack), and the cycle could only be safely conducted in very calm seas. The limited range and capability of the aircraft itself, due to its small size, greatly restricted the tactical utility of the concept. After further trials during 1926, all the experimental aircraft were scrapped.

== Variants ==
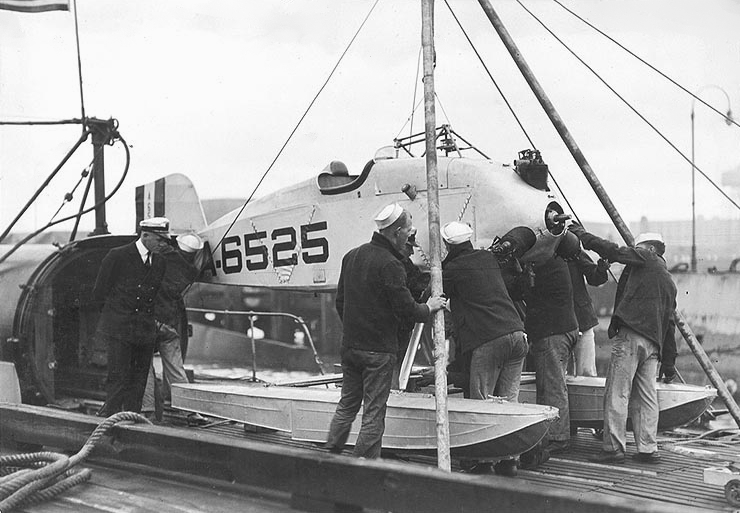
A Martin MS-1 being assembled on the submarine USS S-1 in 1923.

MS-1
six built (BuNo A6521-A6526).

== Operators ==
United States

- United States Navy

== Specifications ==
Data from

General characteristics

- Crew: one
- Length: 18 ft 1 in (5.50 m)
- Wingspan: 18 ft 0 in (5.34 m)
- Height: 8 ft 0 in (2.38 m)
- Empty weight: 650 lb (295 kg)
- Gross weight: 1,007 lb (456 kg)
- Powerplant: 1 × Lawrance L-4 , 60 hp (44 kW)

Performance

- Maximum speed: 100 mph (161 km/h, 87 kn)
- Range: 200 mi (320 km, 170 nmi)
- Service ceiling: 8,500 ft (2,590 m)

== See also ==
Aircraft of comparable role, configuration, and era

- Caspar U.1
- Cox-Klemin XS
- Parnall Peto
- Yokosuka E6Y

Related lists

- List of United States Navy aircraft designations (pre-1962)

== Bibliography ==
- Swanborough, Gordon, and Bowers, Peter M. United States Navy Aircraft Since 1911, 2nd Edition. Naval Institute Press, 1976. ISBN 0-87021-968-5
- Passingham, Malcolm (February 2000). "Les hydravions embarqués sur sous-marins" [Submarine-carried Seaplanes]. Avions: Toute l'aéronautique et son histoire (in French) (83): 7–17. ISSN 1243-8650.
