= Watanabe E9W =

Japanese reconnaissance seaplane

E9W
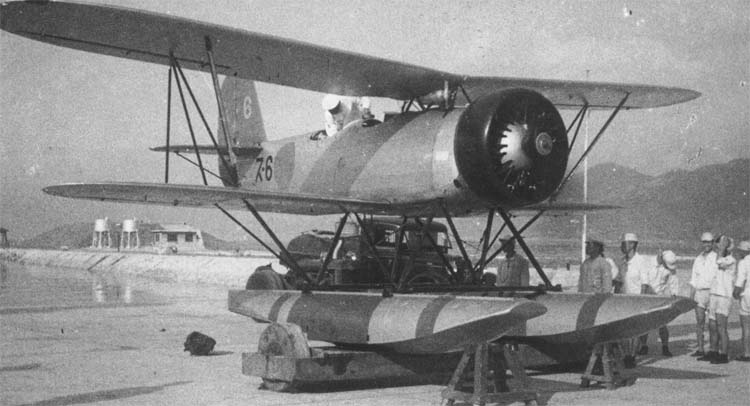
- E9W1

General information
- Type: Submarine-borne reconnaissance seaplane
- National origin: Japan
- Manufacturer: Watanabe Ironworks
- Primary users: Imperial Japanese Navy Royal Thai Navy
- Number built: 35

History
- Introduction date: 1938
- First flight: February 1935
- Retired: 1942

The Watanabe E9W was a Japanese submarine-borne reconnaissance seaplane, the first aircraft designed by Watanabe Ironworks. It received the Allied reporting name of "Slim" in 1942.

== Development and design ==
In January 1934, the Imperial Japanese Navy had a requirement for a two-seat reconnaissance seaplane to be operated from its J-3 type submarines, and it placed an order with Watanabe for design and development of an aircraft to meet this requirement. The first of three prototypes flew in February 1935.

The E9W was a two-seat, single-engine, twin-float, unequal-span seaplane designed to be easily dismantled for hangar stowage on a submarine, capable of being reassembled in two minutes 30 seconds and disassembled in one minute 30 seconds. It was armed with a 7.7 mm (0.303 in) machine gun operated by the observer. Following successful testing of one of the prototypes on the submarine I-5, an order for a production batch of 32 aircraft, designated E9W1, was placed. When the Pacific War begun, six E9W1s were operational; this number was nearly doubled by July 1942.

E9Ws left the Watanabe factory with an Alclad coating and a black engine cowling. Combat units then went on to apply camouflage as they saw fit, usually from stocks available in depots, shipyards, or other bases.

== Operational history ==
The aircraft entered service in 1938 with the Imperial Japanese Navy Air Service as the Navy Type 96 Small Reconnaissance Seaplane with the last being delivered in 1940. Although it was in the process of being replaced by the Yokosuka E14Y monoplane, it was still in front-line service at the time of the Japanese attack on Pearl Harbor, remaining in service until July 1942, being used to direct their parent submarines onto Chinese ships attempting to pass the Japanese blockade of the South China Sea.

== Operators ==
- Empire of Japan
  - Imperial Japanese Navy
- Thailand
  - Royal Thai Navy

== Specifications (E9W1) ==
Data from War Planes of The Second World War: Volume Six: Floatplanes

General characteristics

- Crew: 2 (pilot, observer)
- Length: 8.00 m (26 ft 3 in)
- Wingspan: 9.91 m (32 ft 9.5 in)
- Height: 3.71 m (12 ft 2 in)
- Wing area: 23.51 m^{2} (252.95 sq ft)
- Empty weight: 882 kg (1,940 lb)
- Gross weight: 1,253 kg (2,756 lb)
- Powerplant: 1 × Hitachi Tempu II radial engine , 224 kW (300 hp)

Performance

- Maximum speed: 232 km/h (144 mph, 125 kn)
- Cruise speed: 148 km/h (92 mph, 80 kn)
- Range: 731 km (454 mi, 395 nmi)
- Endurance: 4.9 hours
- Service ceiling: 6,740 m (22,100 ft)

Armament

- 1 x 7.7mm (0.303in) machine gun

== See also ==
Aircraft of comparable role, configuration, and era

- Yokosuka E14Y

Related lists

- List of aircraft of World War II
- List of flying boats and floatplanes
- List of submarine-borne aircraft
