= Parnall Peto =

British seaplane

Peto
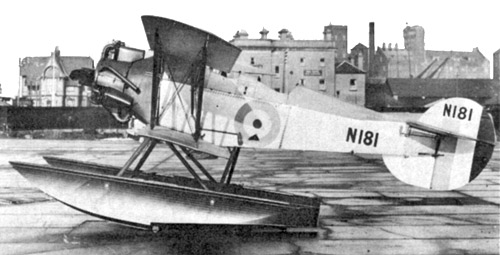

General information
- Type: Submarine-launched naval reconnaissance
- Manufacturer: George Parnall and Company Limited
- Designer: Harold Bolas
- Number built: 2

History
- First flight: 4 June 1925

The Parnall Peto was a small seaplane designed to the British Air Ministry's specification 16/24 in the early 1920s for use as a submarine-carried reconnaissance aircraft.

== Design and development ==
Two examples were designed and built by George Parnall and Company and were given serial numbers N181 and N182. The first prototype, N181, crashed at Gibraltar and was rebuilt as N255 before being lost with the submarine HMS M2 when her hangar flooded. The Peto was one of the most challenging design projects that the Parnall company undertook, because of the very small hangar in which the aircraft had to fit.

Of mixed wood, fabric, aluminium and steel construction, it had unequal span, Warren-braced folding rectangular wings. The first aircraft, N181, was powered by a 128 hp Bristol Lucifer engine and had mahogany plywood "Consuta" type floats. Performance was generally satisfactory but following crash damage, improvements were made and the machine was rebuilt with new wings, metal floats and a 169 hp Armstrong Siddeley Mongoose engine. Tests both on the sea and in the air showed that designer, Harold Bolas, had met the requirements and it was officially judged to be exceptionally good.

The aircraft was launched using a compressed air catapult mounted on the forward casing of the submarine and recovered using a crane.

With the loss of M2, the Royal Navy abandoned submarine-launched aircraft, although most other navies also experimented with the concept in the interwar years.

== Aircraft ==
The two aircraft built were:

N181
Prototype which was wrecked at Gibraltar on 11 February 1930 and rebuilt as N255 with improved floats and lost with HMS M2.

N182
Which crashed 29 June 1930 at Stokes Bay. It was acquired by F.C.H. Allen and prepared for civil use at Ford aerodrome in Sussex between 1933 and 1934. Issued with civilian Registration G-ACOJ but the project was abandoned.

== Specifications ==
Data from Wixey, pp.159–160

General characteristics

- Crew: 2
- Length: 22 ft 6 in (6.86 m)
- Wingspan: 28 ft 5 in (8.66 m)
- Height: 8 ft 11 in (2.72 m)
- Wing area: 174 sq ft (16.2 m^{2})
- Empty weight: 1,300 lb (590 kg)
- Gross weight: 1,950 lb (885 kg)
- Powerplant: 1 × Armstrong Siddeley Mongoose IIIC 5-cylinder air-cooled radial piston engine, 135 hp (101 kW)
- Propellers: 2-bladed fixed-pitch propeller

Performance

- Maximum speed: 113 mph (182 km/h, 98 kn)
- Service ceiling: 11,300 ft (3,400 m)
- Rate of climb: 600 ft/min (3.0 m/s)

== See also ==
Aircraft of comparable role, configuration, and era

- Caspar U.1
- Cox-Klemin XS
- Martin MS-1

Related lists

- List of submarine-borne aircraft
