= Ettore Fieramosca (disambiguation) =

Ettore Fieramosca may refer to:

- Ettore Fieramosca (1476–1515), an Italian nobleman and mercenary captain
- Ettore Fieramosca (novel), an 1833 work by Massimo d'Azeglio
- Ettore Fieramosca (1909 film), a short silent Italian film directed by Ernesto Maria Pasquali
- Ettore Fieramosca (1915 film) a silent Italian film directed by Domenico Gaido and Umberto Paradisi
- Ettore Fieramosca (1938 film), an Italian film directed by Alessandro Blasetti
- Italian cruiser Ettore Fieramosca, an Italian cruiser launched in 1888
- Italian submarine Ettore Fieramosca, an Italian submarine launched in 1929
