= Submarine aircraft carrier =

Submarine equipped with aircraft for observation or attack missions

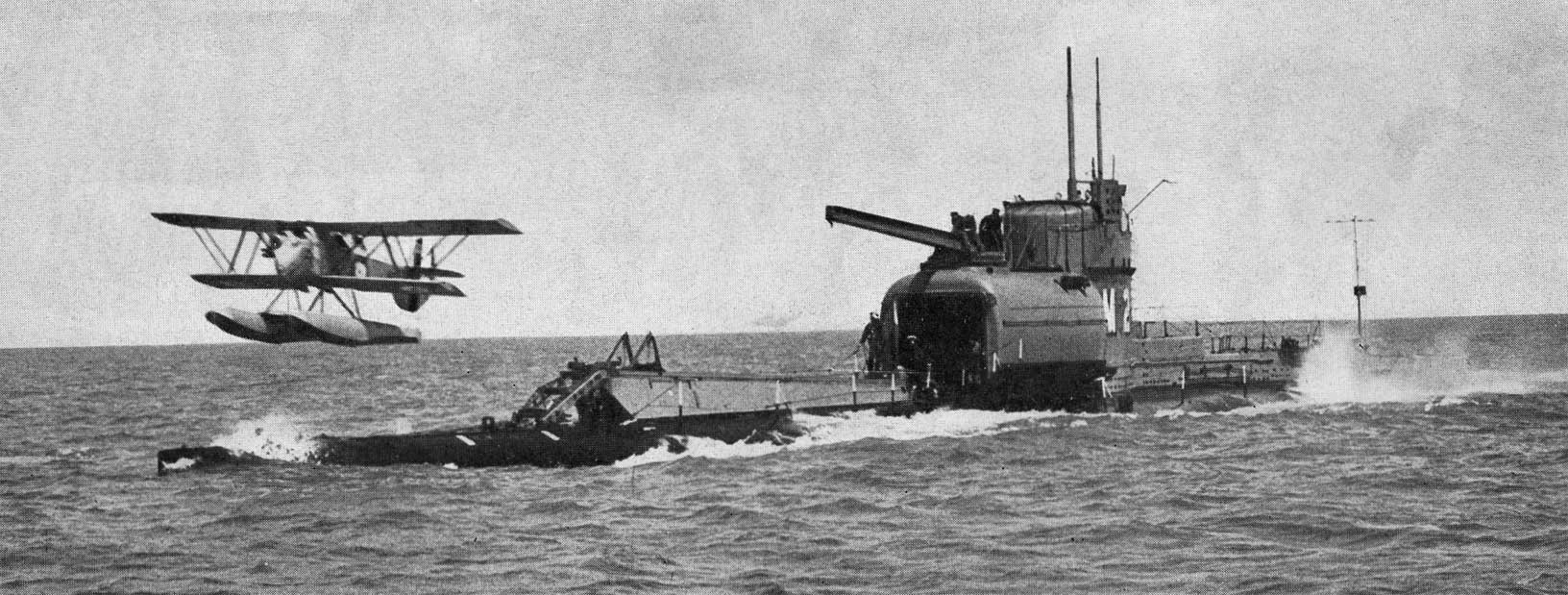
HMS M2 launching her Parnall Peto seaplane

A submarine aircraft carrier is a submarine equipped with aircraft for observation or attack missions. These submarines saw their most extensive use during World War II, although their operational significance remained rather small. The most famous of them were the Japanese I-400-class submarines and the French submarine Surcouf, although small numbers of similar craft were built for other nations' navies as well.

All operational submarine aircraft carriers, with the exception of the Junsen Type A Mod.2 and Sentoku Types, used their aircraft for reconnaissance and observation. This is in contrast to the typical surface aircraft carrier, whose main function is serving as a base for offensive aircraft.

== Early history (World War I) ==
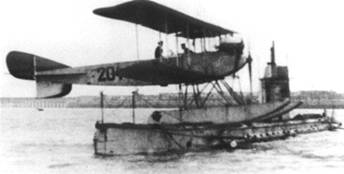
SM U-12 with a seaplane on deck

Germany was the first nation to experiment with submarine aircraft carriers, initiated by the Imperial German Naval Air Service commander Oberleutnant zur See Friedrich von Arnauld de la Perière who commanded a unit of two Friedrichshafen FF.29 reconnaissance seaplanes in Zeebrugge. One of the first U-boats to arrive at the Zeebrugge base was Kapitänleutnant Walther Forstmann's SM U-12, which was to play the role of a submarine aircraft carrier.

The unarmed FF-29 seaplanes were modified to carry 26 1/2-pound (12.0 kg) bombs. On 25 December 1915, one of the newly modified aircraft flew across the English Channel and up the River Thames, dropping bombs on the outskirts of London, although they caused only minor damage. It was pursued by British fighters but returned to base safely. On this first bombing mission it was apparent that the aircraft suffered more from a lack of range.

Encouraged by this success, Arnauld and Forstmann theorised that they could increase the range by carrying the aircraft off the British coast on the deck of a submarine in a takeoff position, then launching the aircraft by partially submerging, allowing the seaplane to float off. On 6 January 1915, U-12 made a launch of an FF-29 off its deck in Zeebrugge within the safety of the breakwater Zeebrugge Mole. The aircraft was then lashed athwartships again and the submarine left the harbour, seemingly dwarfed by the 53 ft 2 in (16.21 m) wingspan of the biplane, which stretched almost ⅓ of the 188 ft (57 m) length of the small coastal patrol submarine. U-12 carried the FF-29 for 30 miles before flooding the forward tanks and letting the seaplane float off the deck without much difficulty, after which the plane took off. Arnauld originally intended to rendezvous with the sub, but decided against it. After gaining altitude, Arnauld left for the British coast which he apparently flew along undetected before returning to Zeebrugge. Although the aircraft had been carried out to sea and had safely floated off the submarine's deck, it was obvious improvements were needed in the procedure and setup.

Arnauld and Forstmann proposed further experiments to the German Naval Command, but were vetoed as their project was considered impractical. The plans were reinvestigated in 1917 in the hope that they would increase the striking power of new German subs such as the long-range cruiser-type Unterseeboote, which were to be equipped with small scouting seaplanes that could be assembled and dismantled onboard and stored in special compartments on deck – but the idea was abandoned as the war came to an end.

Two of the aircraft designs created for that purpose were the biplane Hansa-Brandenburg W.20 and LFG Stralsund V 19 Putbus low-wing monoplane. The first type was designed in 1917 for use aboard the Cruiser submarines that never went into service.

The British also experimented with the aircraft-carrying submarine concept when HMS E22 was fitted out in a manner similar to the German U-boat but for the purpose of intercepting German airships as they crossed the North Sea. It was capable of launching two Sopwith Schneider floatplanes in 1916. However, just as in the German experiment, the aircraft were carried unprotected on the deck and the submarine was unable to submerge without losing them.

== Between the wars ==
=== France ===
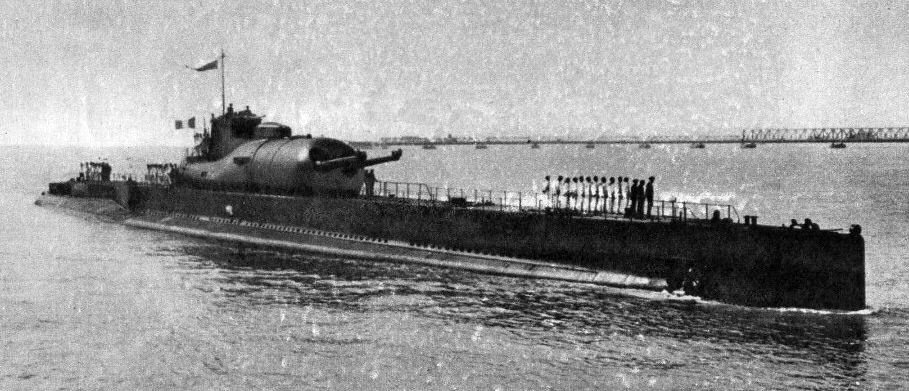
French submarine Surcouf

Surcouf was a French submarine ordered in December 1927, launched 18 October 1929, and commissioned May 1934. At 4,000 tons (3,600 tonnes) displacement submerged, Surcouf was the largest submarine in the world at the start of World War II.

Surcouf was designed as an "cruiser submarine", intended to seek and engage in surface combat. For the first part of that mission, it carried an observation float plane in a hangar built into the after part of the conning tower; for the second part, it was armed with not only 12 torpedo tubes but also a twin 8-inch (203 mm) gun turret forward of the conning tower. The guns were fed from a magazine holding 60 rounds and controlled by a director with a 16 ft 6 in (5.03 m) rangefinder, mounted high enough to view a 7 mi (11 km) horizon. In theory, the observation plane could direct fire out to the guns' 15 mi (24 km) maximum range. Anti-aircraft cannons and machine guns were mounted on the top of the hangar.

=== Italy ===
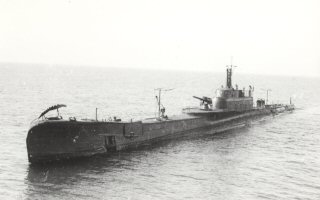
Italian submarine Ettore Fieramosca

The Regia Marina (Royal Italian Navy) ordered Ettore Fieramosca, a submarine with a waterproof hangar for a small reconnaissance seaplane in the late-1920s. In 1928 Macchi and Piaggio each received orders for suitable aircraft which resulted in the Macchi M.53 and the Piaggio P.8, but the program was cancelled, and the submarine's hangar was removed in December 1931, before Ettore Fieramosca was delivered.

=== Japan ===
The Japanese applied the concept of the "submarine aircraft carrier" extensively, starting with the J2 class I-6 and the J3 class of 1937–38. Altogether 42 submarines were built with the capability to carry floatplanes, one such vessel being I-8.

=== United Kingdom ===
After the loss of the heavy gun-carrying HMS M1 and the Washington Naval Treaty which restricted the armament of vessels that were not capital ships, the remaining M-class submarines were converted to other uses. By 1927, HMS M2 had entered service with a waterproof hangar for a Parnall Peto seaplane with folding wings, which could be launched and recovered with the aid of a derrick. In October 1928, she was fitted with a hydraulic catapult which allowed the seaplane to be launched from a ramp on the forward casing. The submarine and her plane could then provide reconnaissance ahead of the fleet, submerging when threatened. HMS M2 herself was lost in 1932, and plane-launching submarines were abandoned by the Royal Navy.

=== United States ===
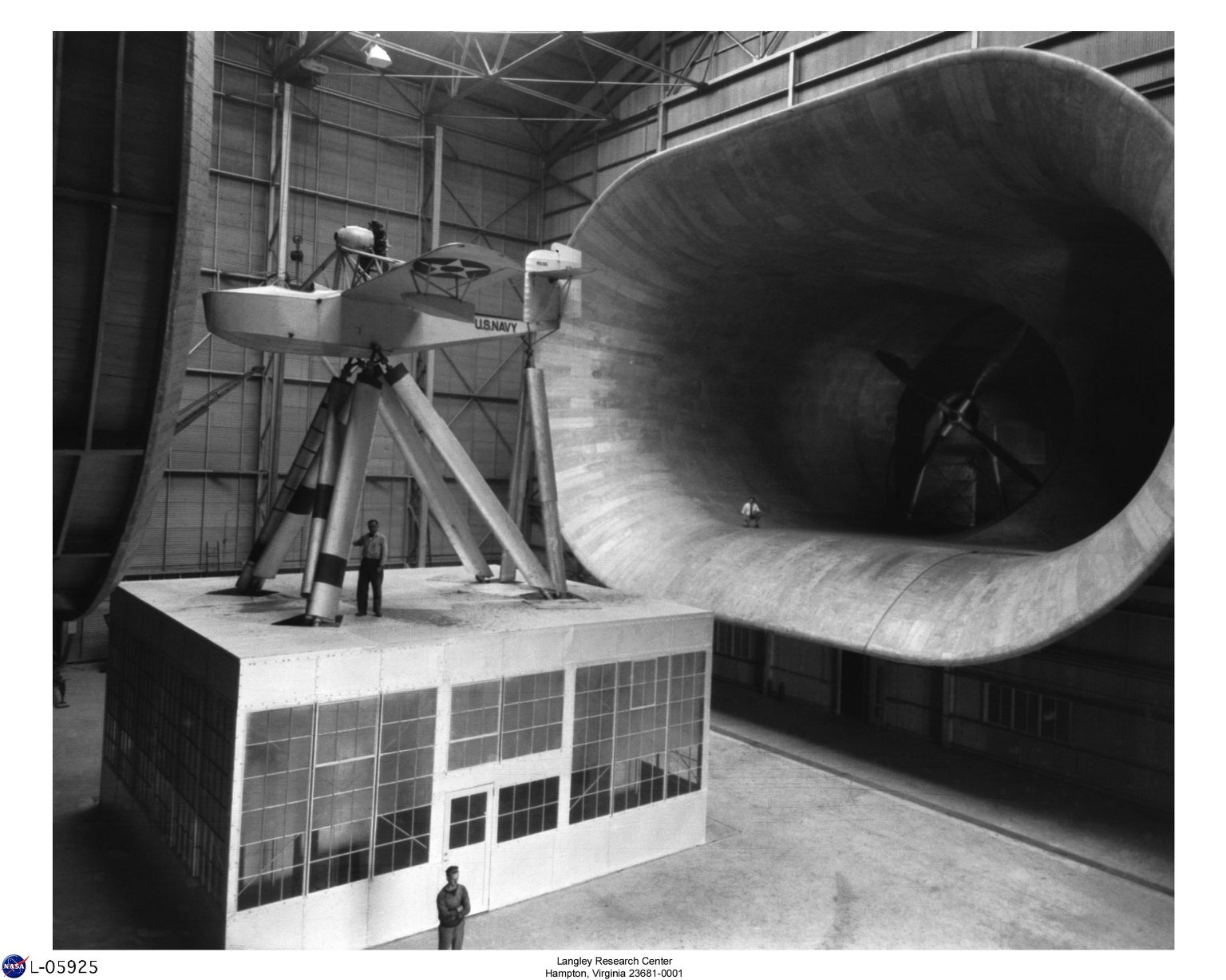
Loening XSL-1 in Langley wind tunnel

The United States began studying the concept in 1922 when two Caspar U.1 seaplanes were purchased from Germany for evaluation at Anacostia Naval Station. One aircraft was later lost during an exhibition flight in 1923, but they provided useful technical information.

The United States Navy ordered six Cox-Klemin XS-1s and six Martin MS-1s, both small seaplanes that like the Caspar U-1 could be disassembled easily. Both were tested aboard S-1 during October and November 1923. Later, Cox-Klemm built the improved XS-2 model, and Loening built the XSL, but the Navy had lost interest in the concept by then. Problems with launching and recovering the aircraft, and the limited military value caused interest in the concept to wane, and news that the British submarine M2 had sunk during trials in 1933, plus damage to the XSL during testing on the sheltered waters of the Anacostia River ended further U.S. Navy development.

== World War II ==
=== Germany ===
The Kriegsmarine (German navy) also started development of submarines capable of launching aircraft and ordered four very large "cruiser" U-boats in early 1939. These boats were to be twice as large as any existing U-boat and were to have had a crew of 110 while carrying a single Arado Ar 231 floatplane, but were cancelled at the outbreak of war later that year.

Although not strictly an aircraft, some U-boats carried the Focke-Achgelis Fa 330 (English: Wagtail). It was a type of rotary-wing kite, known as a gyroglider or rotor kite. They were towed behind German U-boats during World War II and allowed a lookout in the kite to see further.

==== Type IX D 2-"Monsun" ====
Another German long range U-boat was the Type IX D2 "Monsun", used in the Indian Ocean and Far East Area based in Penang (Occupied Malaya). To aid such submarines the observation "Autogyro-Kite" Focke-Achgelis Fa 330 "Bachstelze" (Wagtail) was developed. This was used in the Indian Ocean and sporadically in the Southern Atlantic but its use hindered the submarine's ability to submerge quickly.

The Flettner Fl 282A "Kolibri" reconnaissance-helicopter was also planned to be used from long range submarines. This single seat helicopter was manufactured of welded steel tubing and was sized so that it could be stowed with rotor blades and landing gear removed in a 5.9 ft [1.8 m] diameter by 18 ft [5.5 m] long pressured hangar on the U-boat's deck. The Fl 282 "Kolibri" was never deployed on a German submarine.

=== Japan ===
The Japanese applied the concept of the submarine aircraft carrier extensively. Altogether 47 submarines were built with the capability to carry seaplanes. Most IJN submarine aircraft carriers could carry only one aircraft, though a few types could carry two, and the giant I-400 class submarines could carry three.

==== Type B1 (20 units) ====
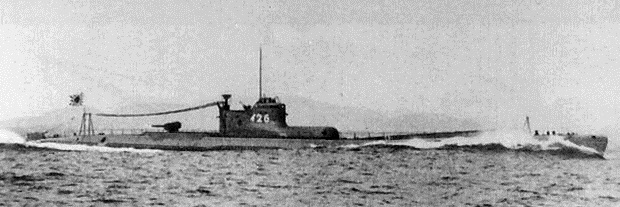
B1 type submarine.

The Type B1 (I-15 Series) submarines (I-15, I-17, I-19, I-21, I-23, I-25, I-26, I-27, I-28, I-29, I-30, I-31, I-32, I-33, I-34, I-35, I-36, I-37, I-38, I-39) were the most numerous type of submarines of the Imperial Japanese Navy during World War II. In total, 20 were made, starting with number I-15, which became the name of the series. These submarines were fast, had a very long range, and carried a single Yokosuka E14Y seaplane, located in a hangar in front of the conning tower, which was launched by a catapult.

The series was rather successful, especially at the beginning of the war. In 1942, I-26 crippled the aircraft carrier USS Saratoga. I-19, on 15 September 1942, fired six torpedoes at the carrier USS Wasp, two of which hit the carrier and crippled it, with the remaining torpedoes damaging the battleship USS North Carolina and the destroyer O'Brien which sank later. I-25 conducted the only aerial bombings ever on the contiguous United States in September 1942, when an aircraft launched from it dropped two incendiary bombs on a forest near the town of Brookings, Oregon.

==== Type A3 (I-13, I-14) ====
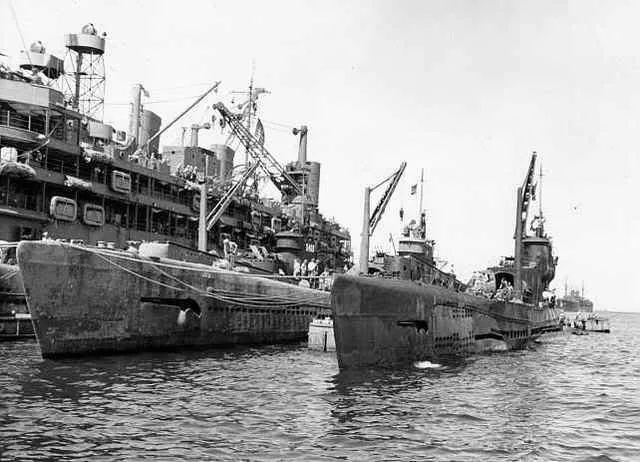
Japanese submarine I-14 in 1945.

The Type A Mod.2 submarine was a large seaplane-carrying submarine, with a hangar space for two aircraft. These giant submarines were originally of the A2 type, but their design was revised after construction started so that they could carry a second aircraft. The seaplanes were to be the Aichi M6A1 bomber carrying 1,760 pounds (800 kg) bombs.

The range and speed of these submarines was remarkable (21,000 nmi (39,000 km) at 16 kn (30 km/h)), but their underwater performance was compromised, making them easy targets. I-13 was sunk on 16 July 1945 by the destroyer escort USS Lawrence C. Taylor and aircraft action from the escort carrier USS Anzio about 550 mi (890 km) east of Yokosuka. I-14 surrendered at sea at the end of the war, and was later scrapped.

==== Sentoku Type (I-400, I-401, I-402) ====
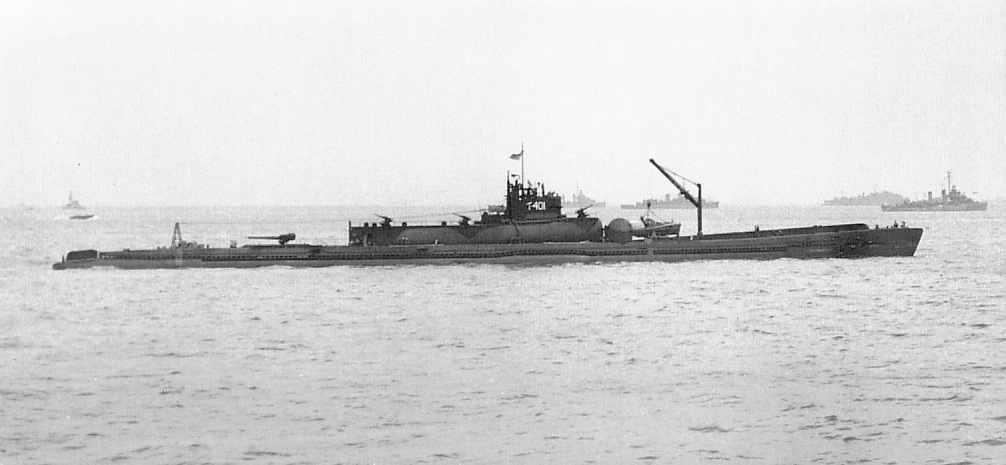
An I-400-class submarine, with its long plane hangar and forward catapult

The I-400-class submarines were the largest submarines of World War II and remained the largest ever built until the construction of nuclear ballistic missile submarines in the 1960s. It displaced 6,500 tons (5,900 tonnes) and was over 122 m (400 ft) long, three times the size of ordinary submarines. It had a figure-eight hull shape for additional strength to handle the on-deck hangar for housing the three Aichi M6A Seiran aircraft. In addition, it had three anti-aircraft guns and a large deck gun as well as eight torpedo tubes from which they could fire the Long Lance – the largest, longest ranged and most deadly torpedo in use at the time.

Three of the Sen Toku were built, I-400, I-401, and I-402. Each had four 3,000 hp (2,200 kW) engines and enough fuel to go around the world 1½ times, more than enough to reach the United States from either direction.

The submarines were also able to carry three Aichi M6A Seiran dive bombers, each carrying up to a 850 kilograms (1,870 lb) bomb at a 1,188 km (738 mi) range at 474 km/h (295 mph). Its name means "clear sky storm", because the Americans would not know they were coming. It had a wing span of 12 m (39 ft) and a length of 12 m (39 ft). To fit the aircraft into the hangar, the wings of the aircraft were folded back, the horizontal stabilizers folded down, and the top of the vertical stabilizer folded over so the overall profile of the aircraft was within the diameter of its propeller. A crew of four could prepare and get all three airborne in 45 minutes, launching them with a 37 m (121 ft) catapult on the fore deck of the giant submarine.

== Postwar studies ==
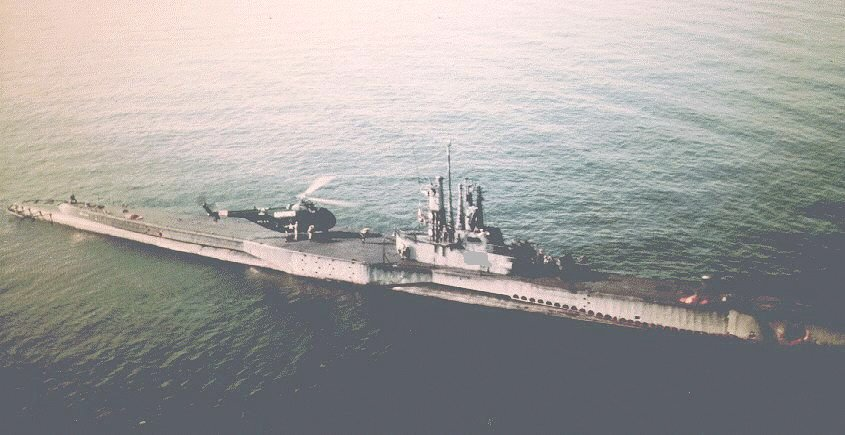
USS Sealion (SS-315) testing helicopter operations in 1956.

In 1947, the Balao-class submarines USS Sealion (SS-315) and USS Perch (SS-313) were modified as "Submarine Transports", with an LVT hangar and a helicopter platform, testing helicopter operations in 1956. The hangar and platform were later removed, and the submarines were decommissioned in the following years.

The US Navy also produced sketch designs of rather fanciful submarine aircraft carriers in 1946 and 1952. The 1946 study had a projected hull classification symbol of SSV, and was initially envisioned to carry two XA2J Super Savage bombers for strategic nuclear strike, or four F2H Banshee fighters. Various watertight hangar and takeoff-landing ramp configurations produced potential lengths ranging from 600 ft (180 m) to 750 ft (230 m), the latter with double the aircraft for a surfaced displacement of 34,000 tons (the Russian Navy's Typhoon-class submarine, the largest ever built, is a mere 24,000 tons surfaced). The 1952 study was slightly more realistic, carrying three F2Y Sea Dart seaplane fighters, with a topside launching ramp for rough seas (the Sea Dart could only take off on a calm sea). This would still be a large submarine, projected at 460 ft (140 m) long and 9,000 tons submerged, with a 70,000 hp (52,000 kW) nuclear power plant to achieve 28 knots (52 km/h). A more economical plan was also conceived to convert World War II fleet submarines to carry a seaplane version of the A4D Skyhawk in a similar manner to the Regulus missile-equipped SSGs, using hydro-skis for takeoff as the Sea Dart did.

== Future designs ==
No submarine aircraft carriers remain in use, but the concept reappears periodically. The ability to make a stealth attack has an allure, but sustained air operations largely negate the advantage of being submersible, and the size limitations preclude sizeable sustained aerial operations. Furthermore, any submarine large enough to be useful would be vulnerable to detection and counterattack. Combined with the cost for such a specialized vessel, it is unlikely that any navy would consider their construction worthwhile. In addition, submarine launchable cruise missiles increasingly incorporate limited surveillance capabilities, allowing them to serve as both strike weapons and disposable reconnaissance drones; this further reduces the value of operating aircraft from submarines.

There are, however, several projects to develop UAV launch and recovery capabilities. There are three methods for doing so: launching out of a torpedo tube, out of a vertical ICBM launch tube, or from a custom designed unit either in the sail or mounted on the hull. The US Navy has recognized the need for more advanced littoral combat capability, to counter growing area-denial asymmetric threats that this type of vessel could provide.

== See also ==
- List of submarine-borne aircraft
- Flying submarine
- Airborne aircraft carrier
- List of submarines of World War II
