= M53 =

M53, M-53, or M.53 may refer to:

== Military ==
- M53 155mm Self-Propelled Gun, an American-made tracked, self-propelled gun
- M53, a Hungarian submachine gun developed from the Soviet PPS-43 submachine gun; see PPS submachine gun#Variants
- Macchi M.53, an Italian military reconnaissance floatplane of 1928
- Snecma M53, a French afterburning turbofan engine developed for the Dassault Mirage 2000 fighter
- M53, Yugoslav copy of the MG42 machine gun
- M53 Yugoslavian army compass

== Roads ==
- M-53 (Michigan highway), a state highway in Eastern Michigan
- M53 highway (Russia), a section of the Baikal Highway in Siberia
- M53 motorway, a motorway in England
- M53 (Johannesburg), a Metropolitan Route in Johannesburg, South Africa

== Other ==
- Messier 53, a globular cluster in the constellation Coma Berenices
- Samsung Galaxy M53 5G, an Android smartphone by Samsung.
