= Piaggio P.8 =

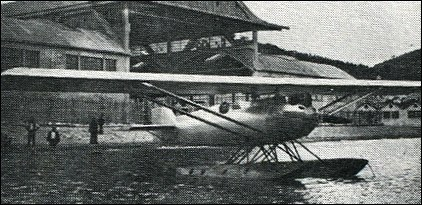

General information
- Type: Reconnaissance floatplane
- National origin: Italy
- Manufacturer: Piaggio
- Primary user: Regia Marina

History
- First flight: 1928

The Piaggio P.8 was an Italian reconnaissance floatplane designed and built by Piaggio for the Regia Marina (Italian Royal Navy).

== Design and development ==
Piaggio designed the P.8 to meet a Regia Marina requirement for a small reconnaissance seaplane that could operate from the large submarine Ettore Fieramosca. The aircraft had to be designed so that it could be stowed disassembled in a watertight, cylindrical hangar aboard the submarine. In order to minimize danger to the submarine and the aircraft during flight operations—which required Ettore Fieramosca to loiter on the surface while the aircraft was being assembled or disassembled—the aircraft was designed to be assembled quickly for flight operations and disassembled quickly after recovery for stowage in its hangar.

The P.8, which first flew in 1928, was a single-seat monoplane with twin floats mounted beneath its fuselage and a parasol wing. Its 56-kilowatt (75-horsepower) Blackburn Cirrus II engine drove a two-bladed propeller and gave it a top speed of 135 kilometers per hour (84 miles per hour).

== Operational history ==
The P.8 was among various small seaplanes considered for use aboard Ettore Fieramosca, which was commissioned in 1930. None of the aircraft were deployed aboard the submarine, and Ettore Fieramosca's hangar was removed in 1931.

== Operators ==
Kingdom of Italy

- Regia Marina

== Specifications ==
General characteristics

- Crew: one
- Powerplant: 1 × Blackburn Cirrus II , 56 kW (75 hp)

Performance

- Maximum speed: 135 km/h (84 mph, 73 kn)

== See also ==
- Italian submarine Ettore Fieramosca

Aircraft of comparable role, configuration, and era

- Macchi M.53

Related lists

- List of seaplanes and flying boats
