= Ettore Fieramosca (1938 film) =

1938 film

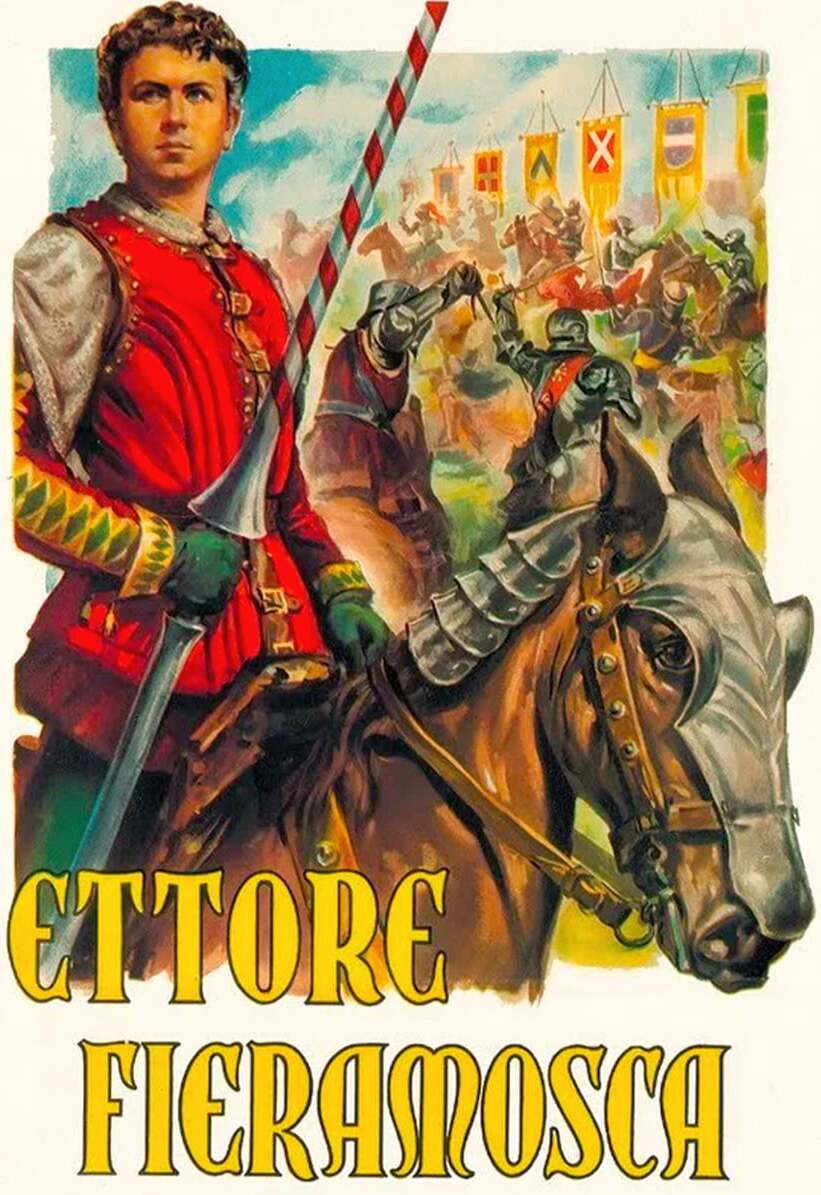
- Directed by: Alessandro Blasetti
- Written by: Massimo D'Azeglio (novel); Vittorio Nino Novarese; Augusto Mazzetti; Cesare Ludovici; Alessandro Blasetti
- Produced by: Attilio Fattori; Vincenzo Genesi
- Starring: Gino Cervi; Mario Ferrari; Elisa Cegani; Osvaldo Valenti
- Cinematography: Mario Albertelli; Václav Vích
- Edited by: Ignazio Ferronetti; Alessandro Blasetti
- Music by: Alessandro Cicognini
- Production company: Nembo Film
- Distributed by: ENIC
- Release date: 29 December 1938
- Running time: 93 minutes
- Country: Italy
- Language: Italian

Ettore Fieramosca is a 1938 Italian historical film directed by Alessandro Blasetti and starring Gino Cervi, Mario Ferrari and Elisa Cegani. It is adapted from the 1833 novel of the same title by Massimo D'Azeglio, based on the life of the 16th century condottiero Ettore Fieramosca.

== Partial cast ==
- Gino Cervi as Ettore Fieramosca
- Mario Ferrari as Graiano d'Asti
- Elisa Cegani as Giovanna di Morreale
- Osvaldo Valenti as Guy de la Motte
- Lamberto Picasso as Prospero Colonna
- Corrado Racca as Don Diego Garcia de Paredes
- Clara Calamai as Fulvia
- Umberto Sacripante as Franciotto
- Gianni Pons as Il duca di Nemours
- Carlo Duse as Jacopo, lo scudiero spia di Graiano
- Mario Mazza as Fanfulla
- Andrea Checchi as Gentilino

== See also ==
- Soldier of Fortune (1976)

== Bibliography ==
- Bondanella, Peter E. (2001-01-01). Italian Cinema: From Neorealism to the Present. Bloomsbury Publishing, Continuum. ISBN 978-0-8264-1247-8.
