= Bartolomeo Fanfulla =

Italian condottiero

Fanfulla da Lodi
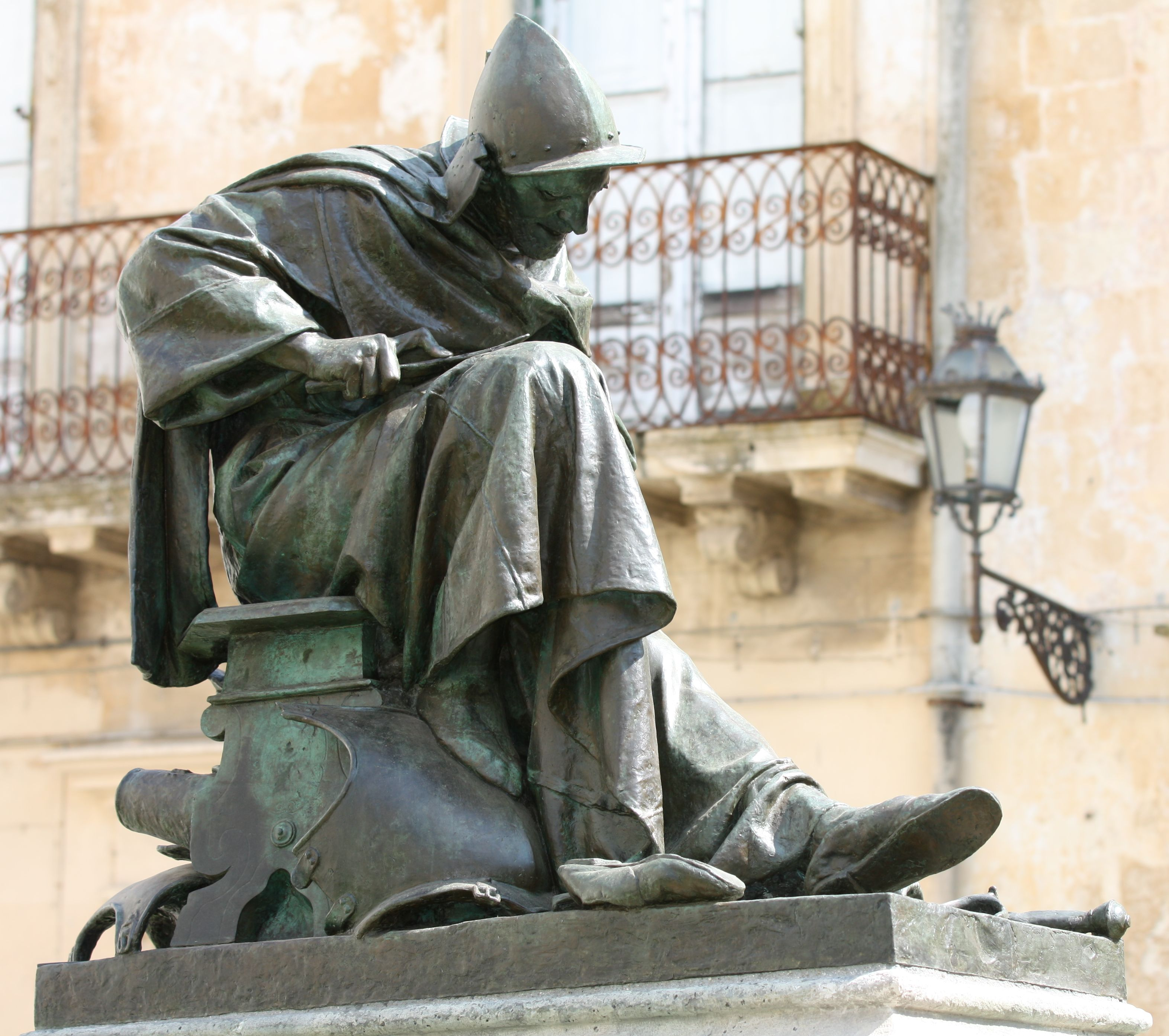
- Born: 1 September 1477; Basiasco
- Died: 24 February 1525 (aged 47); Pavia

Bartolomeo Fanfulla was an Italian condottiero.

== Biography ==
His parents, Domenico Alon and Angela Folli, gave him multiple names: Giovanni or Giovanni Battista (in honour of the Evangelical preacher), Bartolomeo (in honour of Bartolomeo Colleoni) and Tito (in honour of the great Roman emperor). Born in the province of Lodi (but for Guicciardini he is allegedly from Parma), Fanfulla almost certainly died 24 February 1525 in the battle of Pavia. He had at least four children: Marc’Antonio, Ambrosio, Giorgio and Domenico, and nine grandchildren.

He was first a soldier of fortune, then knight and finally captain of a flag between 1499 and 1525. They say of him:

There is no important battle fought across the 16th century in which Fanfulla did not fight, first as simple soldier of fortune and then as Captain of a flag (Alfiere) with his Lanza of fifty armed men directly reporting to him and paid by him

— Pietro Novati, Fanfulla da Lodi, Edizioni Lodigraf, 1982

In his life he fought on the side of Florence (1499), Spain (from 1503) and empire (from 1515) having as enemies Pisa (in 1499) and France (from 1503 onwards).

Together with Ettore Fieramosca he was the main character of the famous battle of Barletta, which on 13 February 1503 saw thirteen Italian warriors fight against the same number of Frenchmen. Having remained horseless (together with Giovanni Bracalone) during the fight, he fought on foot killing the horses of the French jousters. At the end of the battle, he was knighted by the Spanish potestà (chief magistrate) Consalvo di Cordoba. He is one of the main characters of the novel Ettore Fieramosca o La disfida di Barletta (1833), by the politician and man of letters Massimo d'Azeglio, in which the author's fantasy introduces him as an astute, fun and jolly man. The resulting colourful portrait of heroic soldier of fortune gave Fanfulla his fame.

Fanfulla is considered one of the symbols of the town of Lodi and of its territory, so much so that a number of local sports clubs take inspiration from his figure: among the most awarded there is the A.S.Ginnastica e Scherma Fanfulla 1874, l'Atletica Fanfulla and the Associazione Calcio Fanfulla 1874. Moreover, the biscuits Amaretti Fanfullini, a typical product of Lodi, owe their name to him.

A famous Italian goliardic song from the 20th century has been also dedicated to Fanfulla: Fanfulla da Lodi.

In the city of Lecce, bronze statue of him by the Italian sculptor Antonio Bortone from Ruffano is found in the square Raimondello Orsini.

== Battles he took part in ==
He took part in all the main battles of the 16th century. Always giving proof of his great courage he travelled throughout Italy taking part in:

- the siege of Pisa of 1499 (at the side of Paolo Vitelli),
- the challenge of Barletta of 13 February 1503,
- the battle of Cerignola of 1503 (at the service of the Duke of Termoli),
- the battle of Ravenna (1512) (in which he was made prisoner),
- the battle of Villafranca (1515),
- probably also the battle of Pavia of 24 February 1525 (where it is presumed he died).

== Famous quotations ==
They have said of him:

- "The warrior svelto di corpo e bizzarro d'ingegno, il cavaliere di ventura ricco d'ardimento, con qualche macchia forse, but certainly fearless and with an enormous carica enorme di simpatia, true symbol of the human and Italian saper vivere" (Massimo D'Azeglio).
- "Uomo valoroso. Disprezzava ogni pericolo della vita in battaglia".
- "Di animo altero e superbo".
- "Despising any danger in the battle" (Paolo Giovio).
- "Fanfulla is the unpredictable and unexpected side of a Lodi otherwise known as placid and slow-paced; however, there is vitality, it exists, it manifests itself and it certainly does so in the sports field. That little bit or a lot of Fanfulla, swordsman of good fortune, which still resides in us all citizens of Lodi, must push us to revive sport in Lodi" (Age Bassi, Lodi fra storia e cronaca, 1919-1945) (Lodi between history and chronicle, 1919-1945).

== References in popular culture ==
- He appeared as a comics strip character (drawings by Willy Signoroni and text by Andrea Maietti) in the Italian local daily newspaper il Cittadino in the years 2000.
- The Italian goliardic song Fanfulla da Lodi has been dedicated to him; Il barone Fanfulla da Lodi is also a track from the album Polenta violenta (2007) by the lombard heavy metal musician Ul Mik Longobardeath.
- Fanfulla appears on film in Fanfulla da Lodi (1940), directed by Carlo Duse and Giulio Antamoro (with Ennio Cerlesi, Germana Paolieri and Osvaldo Valenti). Another presence of Fanfulla is in Soldier of Fortune (1976), directed by Pasquale Festa Campanile, where he is portrayed by Gino Pernice.
- Fanfulla da Lodi has represented an excellent subject for theatre works entitled to him, mainly inspired by the plots of the novels by D'Azeglio.

== Image gallery ==
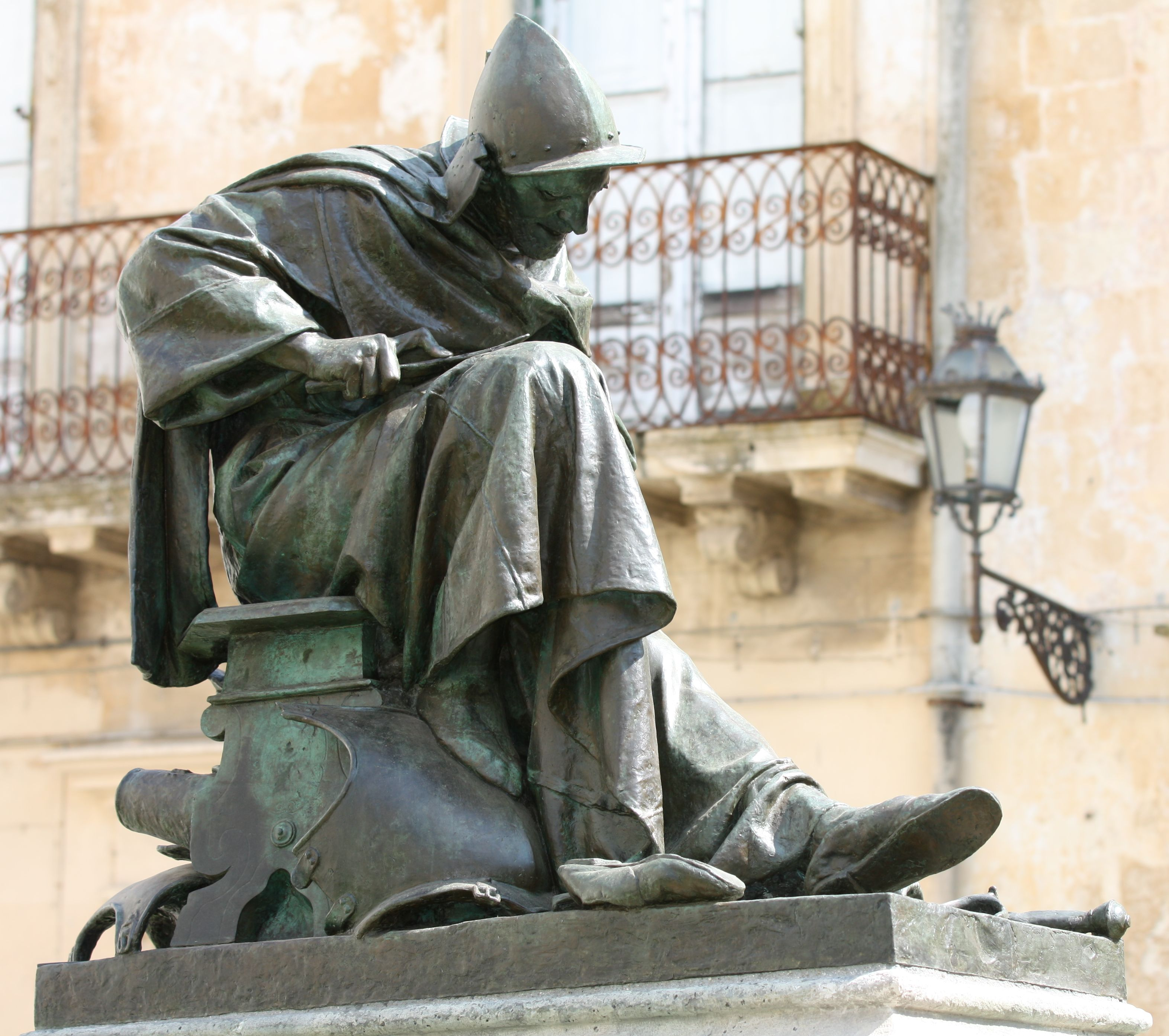
Fanfulla from Lodi in the square Raimondello Orsini in Lecce

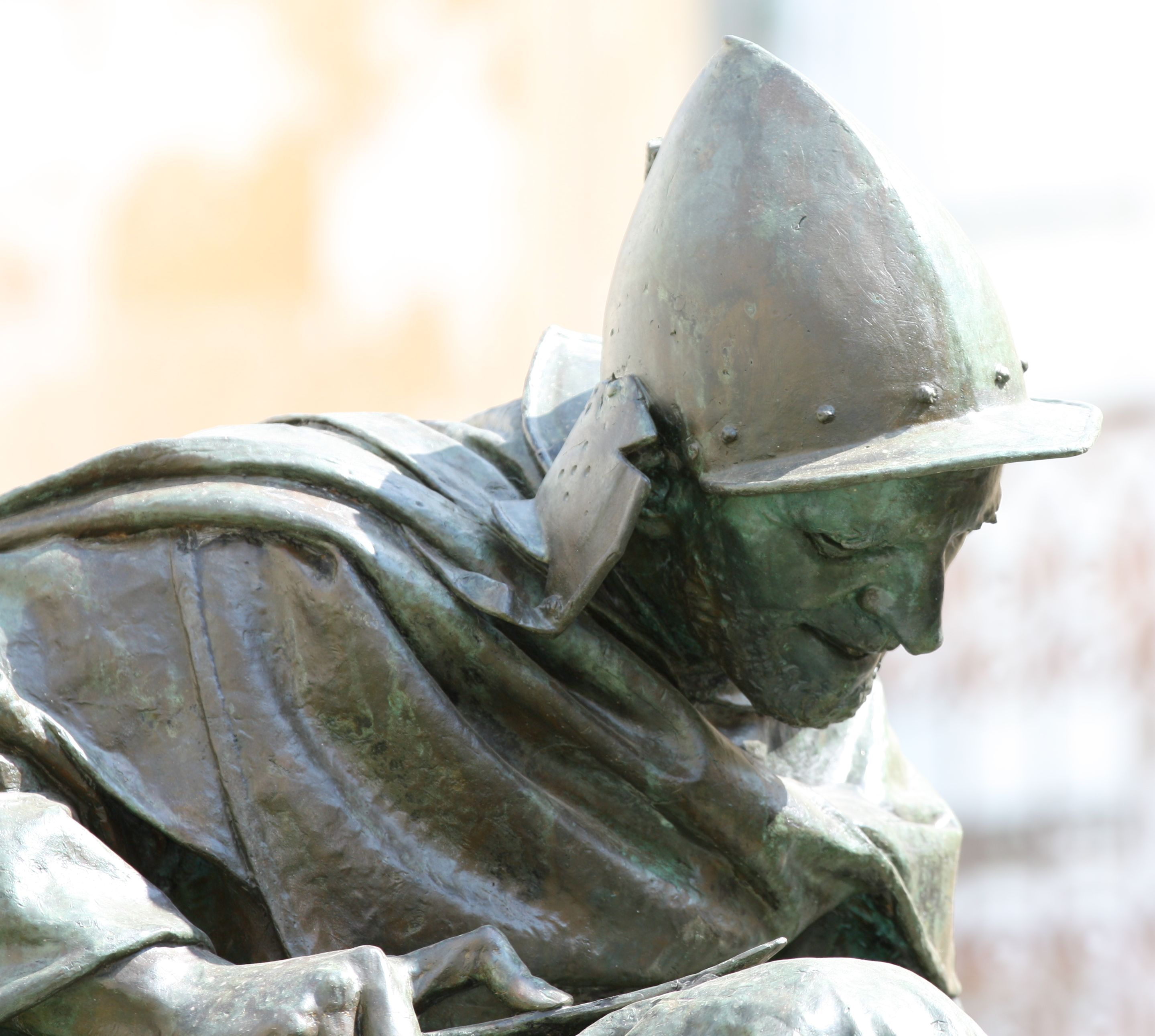
Fanfulla from Lodi in the square Raimondello Orsini in Lecce

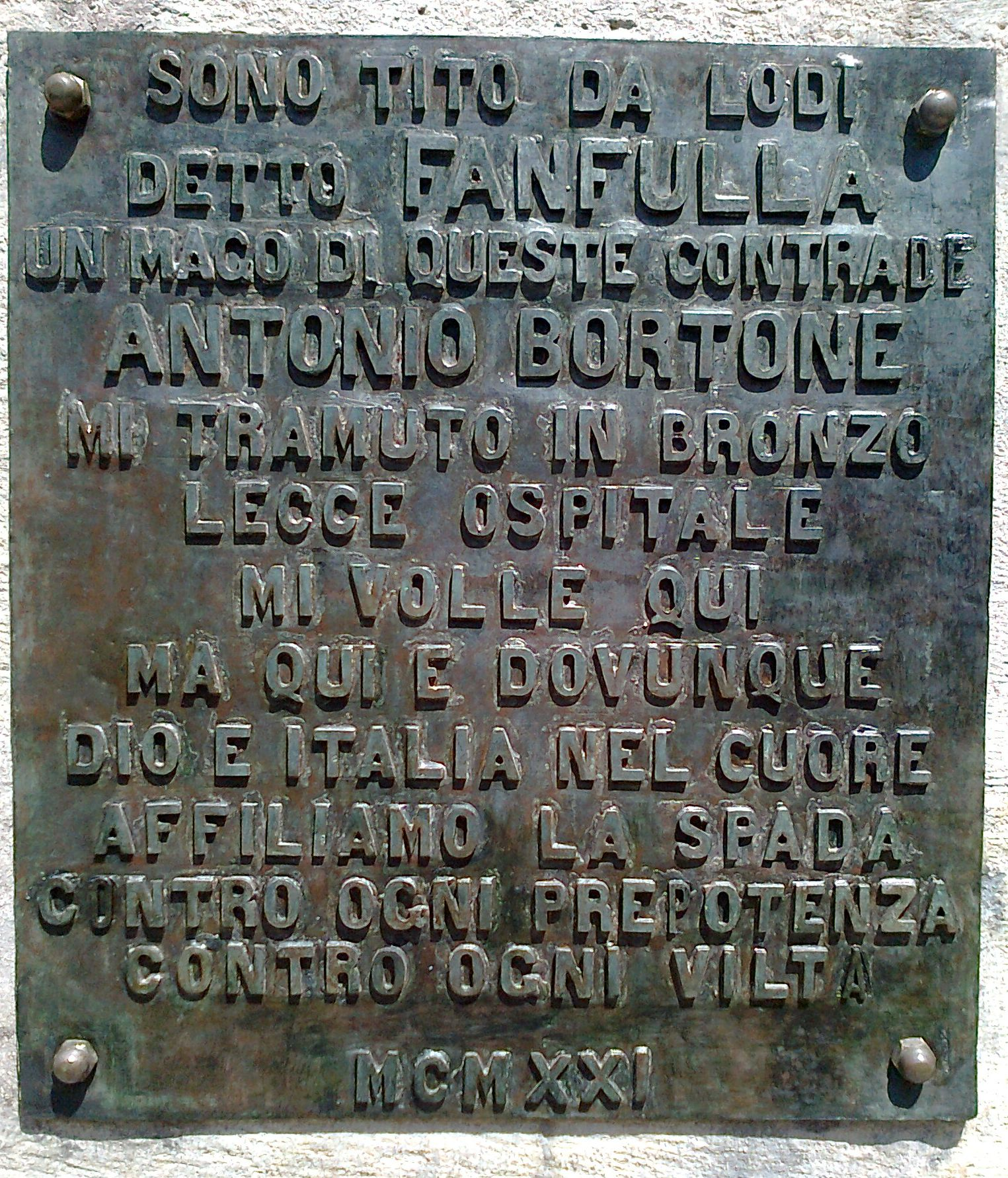
Plaque of Fanfulla from Lodi in the square Raimondello Orsini in Lecce

== Bibliography ==
In Italian:

- Massimo D'Azeglio, Ettore Fieramosca o La disfida di Barletta, 1833.
- Napoleone Gotti, Fanfulla, 1875, published in appendix to the satirical periodic publication "Il Fanfulla" founded in Florence in 1870 and active in Rome from 1871 to 1899.
- Pia Piccoli Addoli, Il romanzo di Fanfulla (a richly illustrated synthesis by Gustavino of the two novels by Massimo D'Azeglio), 1940, UTET.
- Pietro Novati, Fanfulla da Lodi, 1982, Ed. Lodigraf.
