= Rosso Barletta DOC =

Italian red wine with a controlled origin

The Barletta-Andria-Trani province which contains the Rosso Barletta DOC in the northern end of the province

Rosso Barletta is a red Italian wine produced in the Denominazione di origine controllata (DOC) region of Barletta, located in the province of Barletta-Andria-Trani of north-central Apulia. The DOC is permitted to produce red wine only, made primarily from Uva di Troia, and is one of the few wine regions in Italy where Malbec is grown and permitted in a DOC wine. The DOC covers over 60 hectares (150 acres) that are planted to Uva di Troia, Montepulciano, Sangiovese, and Malbec. Rosso Barletta is noted in history for being the spark for a jousting skirmish, now known as the Challenge of Barletta, involving thirteen local Italian knights against thirteen French knights, following an evening of drinking too much Barletta wine. According to the Italian Trade Commission, when the wine region was officially recognised it retained the name Rosso Barletta in commemoration of the historic connection between the region's wine and the event.

== The Challenge of Barletta ==
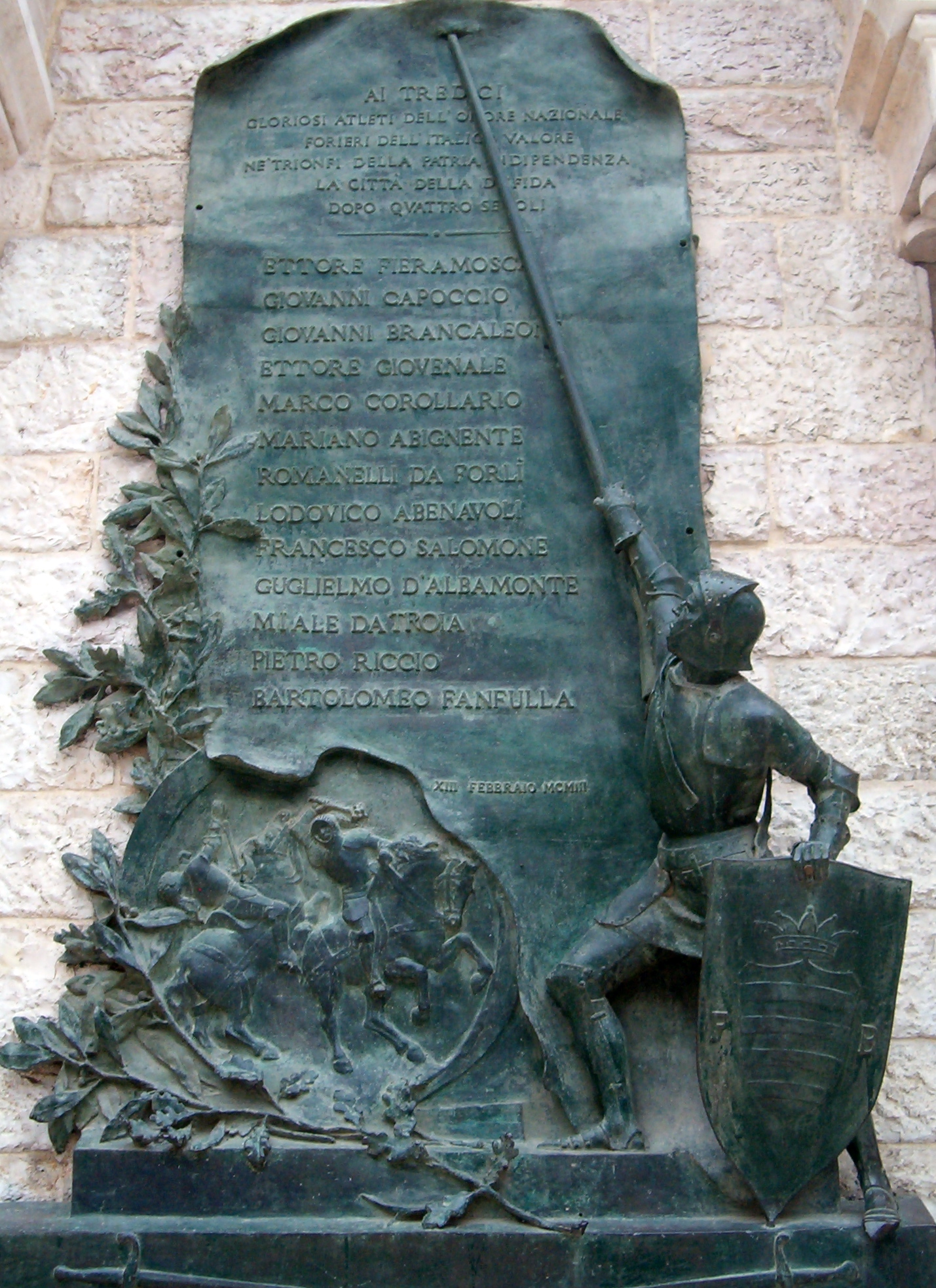
Monument in the commune commemorating the Challenge of Barletta

The prelude to the Challenge of Barletta occurred when the French knight Charles de Touques, Monsigneur de La Motte was having dinner at an inn in Barletta. He was served the red wine from the area, and according to reports by Prospero Colonna, grand captain of the army stationed at Barletta, La Motte overindulged in the wine and became uncivil, insulting nearby Italian knights. To defend their honour, the Italians challenged the Frenchmen to a joust, to be held on 13 February 1503. The French knights were defeated by the Italians and the French then left the area.

== Production zone ==
The production zone for the Rosso Barletta DOC includes 60 hectares (150 acres) around the coastal city of Barletta, north of Bari and Trani.

== DOC requirements ==
The Rosso Barletta DOC is permitted only for the production of red wines. The wine is predominantly a blend, but it can be a varietal that is composed 100% of Uva di Troia. At the very least Uva di Troia must be responsible for at least 70% of the blend with Montepulciano, Sangiovese, and Malbec comprising the remainder of the blend. While the Rosso Barletta DOC is unique in allowing Malbec in its wine, the grape is limited to accounting for no more than 10% of the wine. All grapes destined for Rosso Barletta must be harvested with a yield no greater than 15 tonnes per hectare. The finished red wine is required to have a minimum alcohol level of 12%.

=== Invecchiato ===
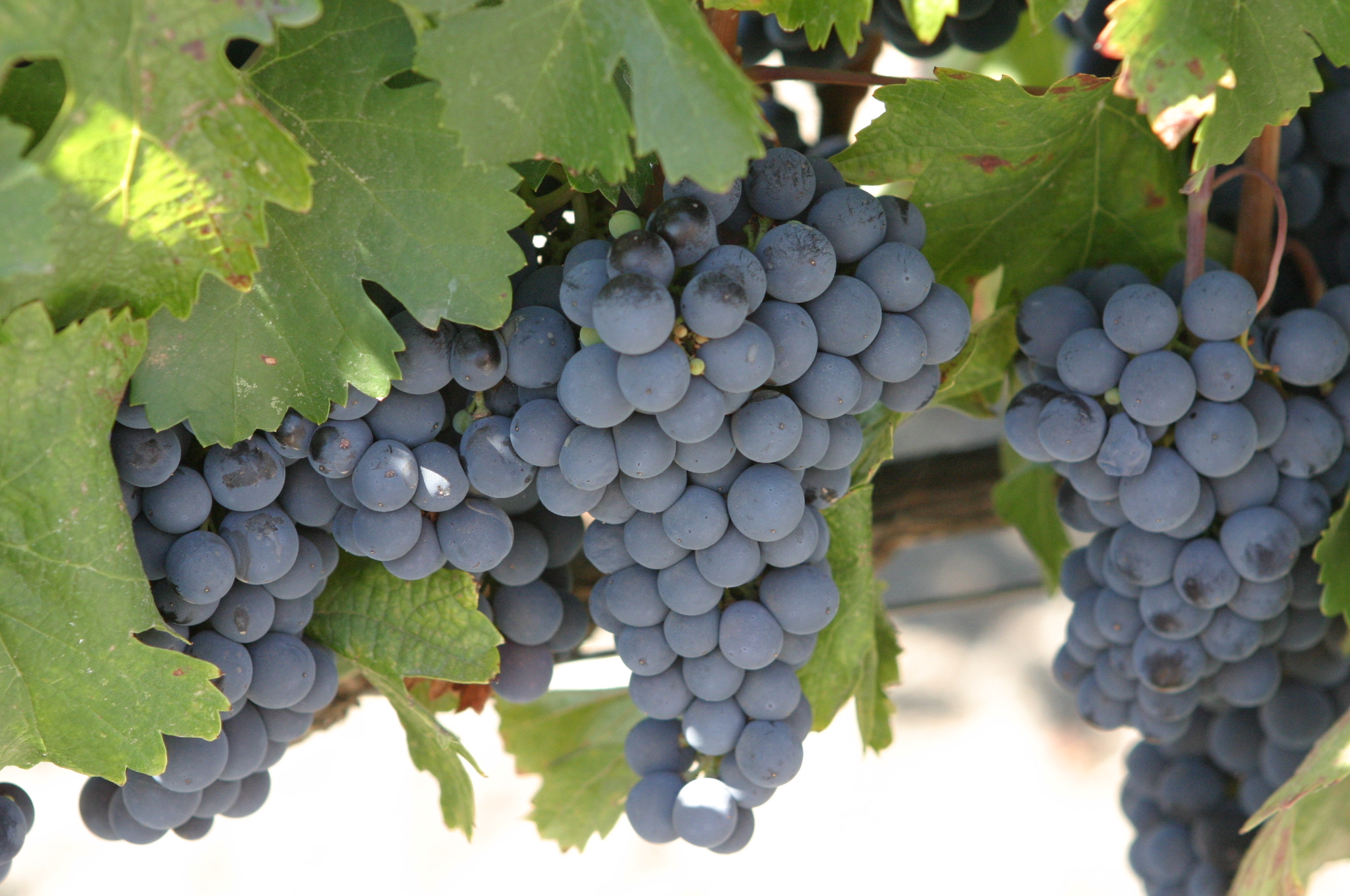
Rosso Barletta is one of the few Italian DOCs that are permitted to include Malbec in the blends

The Rosso Barletta DOC includes a special labelling (similar to Reserva) for aged wines that is called Invecchiato. Unlike Reserva or Superiore, the Invecchiato designation doesn't carry with it any requirement for increased alcohol levels (though the wines do tend to be higher than the usual 12%). Instead the designation is concerned solely with ageing. Wines produced under this designation must be aged for a minimum of two years, with at least one of those years being in oak barrels or some other wooden storage vessel.

== Wine styles ==
According to wine expert Tom Stevenson, Rosso Barletta is a medium bodied, fruity wine with a ruby colour. It is usually consumed very young.

== See also ==
- List of Italian DOC wines
