= Uva di Troia =

Variety of grape

- Grape (Vitis)
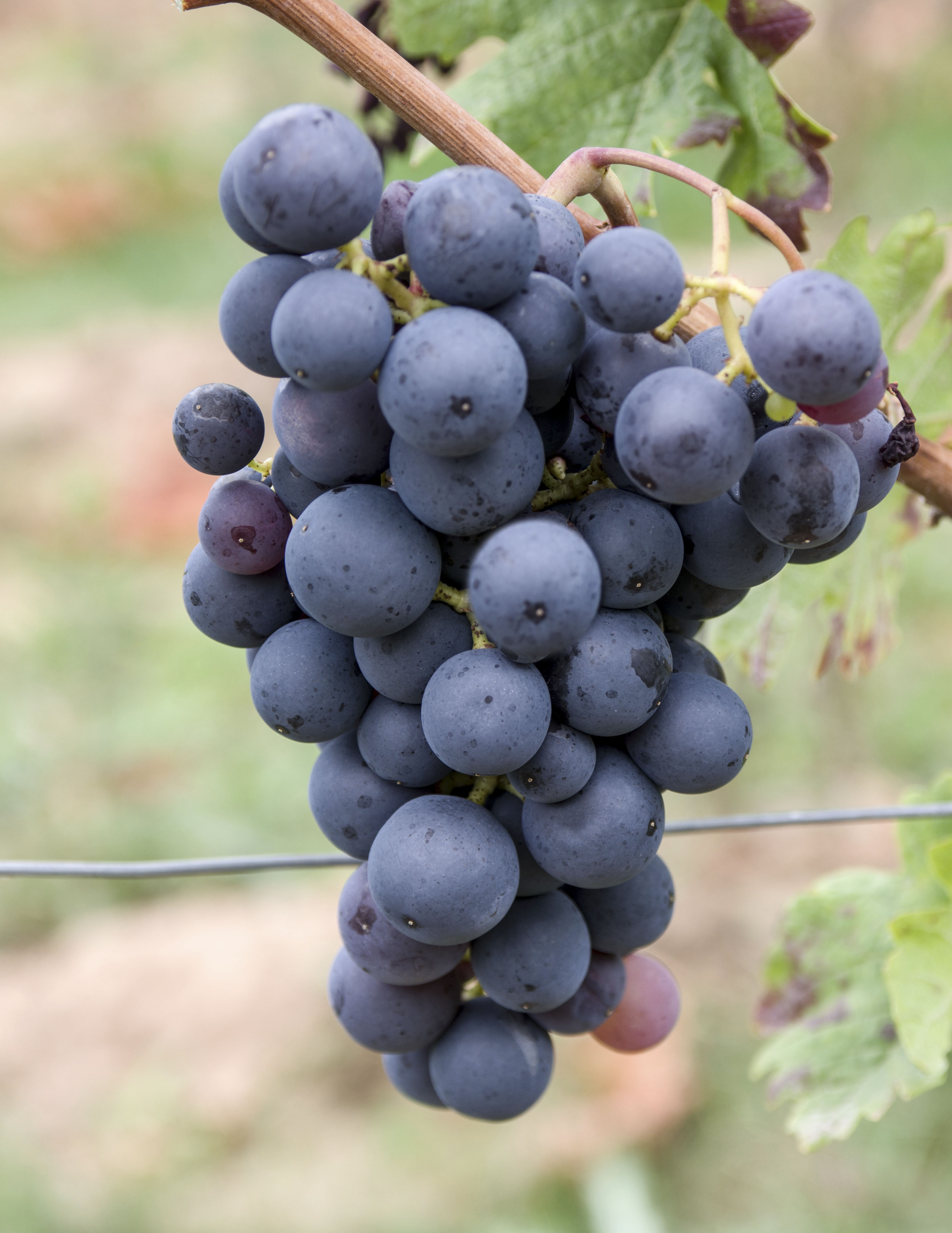
- Origin: Italy
- VIVC number: 12819

Uva di Troia is a red wine grape variety grown in the Italian region of Apulia, particularly in the areas around Andria and Barletta, and in the Province of Bari.

The name probably derives from the town of Troia in the Province of Foggia, the legendary founder of which was the Greek hero Diomedes, after he had destroyed the ancient Troy. Other names which have been used at various times include: Nero di Troia, Sumarello, Uva di Canosa, Uva di Barletta, Troiano, Tranese, and Uva della Marina.

== Characteristics ==
The vine is fairly vigorous, with much girth, and it carries large, rather compact, pyramidal (sometimes “winged”) clusters of violet colored grapes which ripen mid-season. It is adaptable to a variety of soils and does not suffer unduly from the high temperatures of Apulia, although hot winds in summer may cause problems.

== Wines ==
Uva di Troia may be used by itself or can be blended with such grapes as Bombino nero, Montepulciano and Sangiovese. Where DOC wines are concerned, the grape is the principal component of the wines Rosso Barletta and Rosso Canosa; Castel del Monte may also be produced as a pure Uva di Troia variety; it is also used in Cacc'e Mmitte di Lucera (35-60%), Orta Nova (up to 40%) and Rosso di Cerignola. Additionally, in the small town of Troia, just across the Monti Dauni, the wine is produced as Nero di Troia.
