= Soldier of Fortune (1976 film) =

- Directed by: Pasquale Festa Campanile
- Written by: Castellano & Pipolo; Luigi Magni; Pasquale Festa Campanile
- Produced by: Camillo Teti
- Starring: Bud Spencer
- Cinematography: Marcello Masciocchi
- Edited by: Mario Morra
- Music by: Guido & Maurizio De Angelis
- Distributed by: Titanus
- Release date: 1976
- Running time: 102 min
- Country: Italy
- Language: Italian

Soldier of Fortune (Italian: Il soldato di ventura) is a 1976 Italian comedy film directed by Pasquale Festa Campanile. The film tells of the challenge of Barletta in a comic and grotesque style.

== Plot ==
In 1503, while wandering southern Italy in search for employment, soldier of fortune Ettore Fieramosca and his troupe – Bracalone (the group's chronicler), Graiano, Romanello und Fanfulla – run into a siege of the city of Barletta and its Spanish garrison by the French army. Despite his moral code of aiding the underdog, his starving men persuade him to seek their fortune with the French; but when the French commanders, Charles La Motte and the Duke of Namur, contemptuously dismiss them, Ettore sides with the beleaguered Spanish. By single-handedly routing a French assault on the city walls, they win the trust of the Spanish governor, Gonzalo Pedro de Guadarrama. However, with Barletta's provisions nearly depleted and Spanish reinforcements still underway, the situation is bleak for the city's inhabitants.

When Ettore aggressively responds to a provocation by the French feasting in full view of the starving population, the French retaliate with a tower-mounted cannon. While trying to find a way to disable the weapon, Ettore and his men encounter the wandering actor troupe of Capoccio, whose female star Leonora develops a crush on Ettore. With the actors' help, Ettore destroys the gun, but in the meantime Graiano defects and attempts to warn the French about the sneak attack. When the French's hesitation in believing his story results in the cannon's destruction, they lay the blame on Graiano and execute him.

The French subsequently capture Capoccio's troupe, but while looking for Graiano, Ettore comes upon them, frees the captives and kidnaps La Motte and two of his knights. Indignant at having been captured through trickery, La Motte refuses to acknowledge defeat and begins insulting Ettore and Gaiano's memory, whereupon Ettore challenges him to a fight. Since, however, according to the rules of chivalry only a knight may lawfully duel a knight, Ettore is granted three days to assemble a band of thirteen Italian volunteers to be knighted and fight thirteen French knights on equal terms. In actuality, de Guadarrama wishes to use the armistice to let his reinforcements from Spain arrive in time.

Ettore loses no time recruiting; some of his chosen countrymen – among them a number of old acquaintances – join voluntarily, some need persuasion through subterfuge or Ettore's fists. At the day of the duel, de Guadarrama declares that his reinforcements have arrived and that Ettore and his band are no longer needed. Ettore, however, tells de Guadarrama that they are now fighting for their honor instead of money, and de Guadarrama grants his blessing. Ettore and La Motte's groups fight on the nearby beach and whittle each other down until Ettore and La Motte, the only ones left, meet in close combat. Ettore subdues La Motte, winning the duel and lifting the siege. Afterwards, Ettore gifts his chronicles to de Guadarrama, only to find out belatedly that Bracalone cannot write, thus having filled the book with meaningless scrawlings.

== Cast ==
- Bud Spencer: Ettore Fieramosca
- Andréa Ferréol: Leonora
- Philippe Leroy: Charles La Motte
- Marc Porel: Duke of Namur
- Mario Scaccia: Gonzalo Pedro de Guadarrama
- Mariano Rigillo: Albimonte da Peretola
- Angelo Infanti: Graiano d'Asti
- Enzo Cannavale: Bracalone da Napoli
- Oreste Lionello: Giovenale da Vetralla
- Franco Agostini: Romanello da Forlì
- Gino Pernice: Fanfulla da Lodi
- Eros Pagni: Capoccio da Roma
- Renzo Palmer: Fra Ludovico da Rieti
- Jacques Herlin: Paredes
- Jacques Dufilho: Mariano da Trani
- Monica Strebel
- Riccardo Pizzuti as Vilforte (uncredited)

== Production ==
The film was an Italian-French co-production. Scenes were shot in Tarquinia—covering both the interior and exterior of the Church of Santa Maria in Castello—and, fittingly, in Puglia at the Torre della Leonessa and the Swabian-Angevin fortress of Lucera, which was transformed to represent the walls and city of Barletta. Additional exterior shots were filmed in the vicinity of Lucera (on the road to Pietramontecorvino) and on beaches south of the Gargano. The fateful clash was filmed on a beach in Hammamet, Tunisia.

== Soundtrack ==
As with several other films starring Bud Spencer (on his own or with his partner Terence Hill), the film's soundtrack and its theme song "Oh! Ettore", both composed and performed by Guido & Maurizio De Angelis (who provided the film with an unusually monothematic score) and featuring vocalist Osvaldo Resti mimicking Spencer's on-screen persona as the lead singer in the song, became very popular in Italy at the time of the film's release, and are still popular among the comedy duo's international fan base. The soundtrack album, originally released by soundtrack-specialist company CAM, went rapidly out of print and was re-released on CD for the first time in 2009 (as a strictly limited edition) by Abruzzo-based company Digitmovies Alternative Entertainment.

== See also ==
- Ettore Fieramosca (1938)
- List of Italian films of 1976
