= Challenge of Barletta =

1503 battle of the Third Italian War

- Part of the Italian Wars
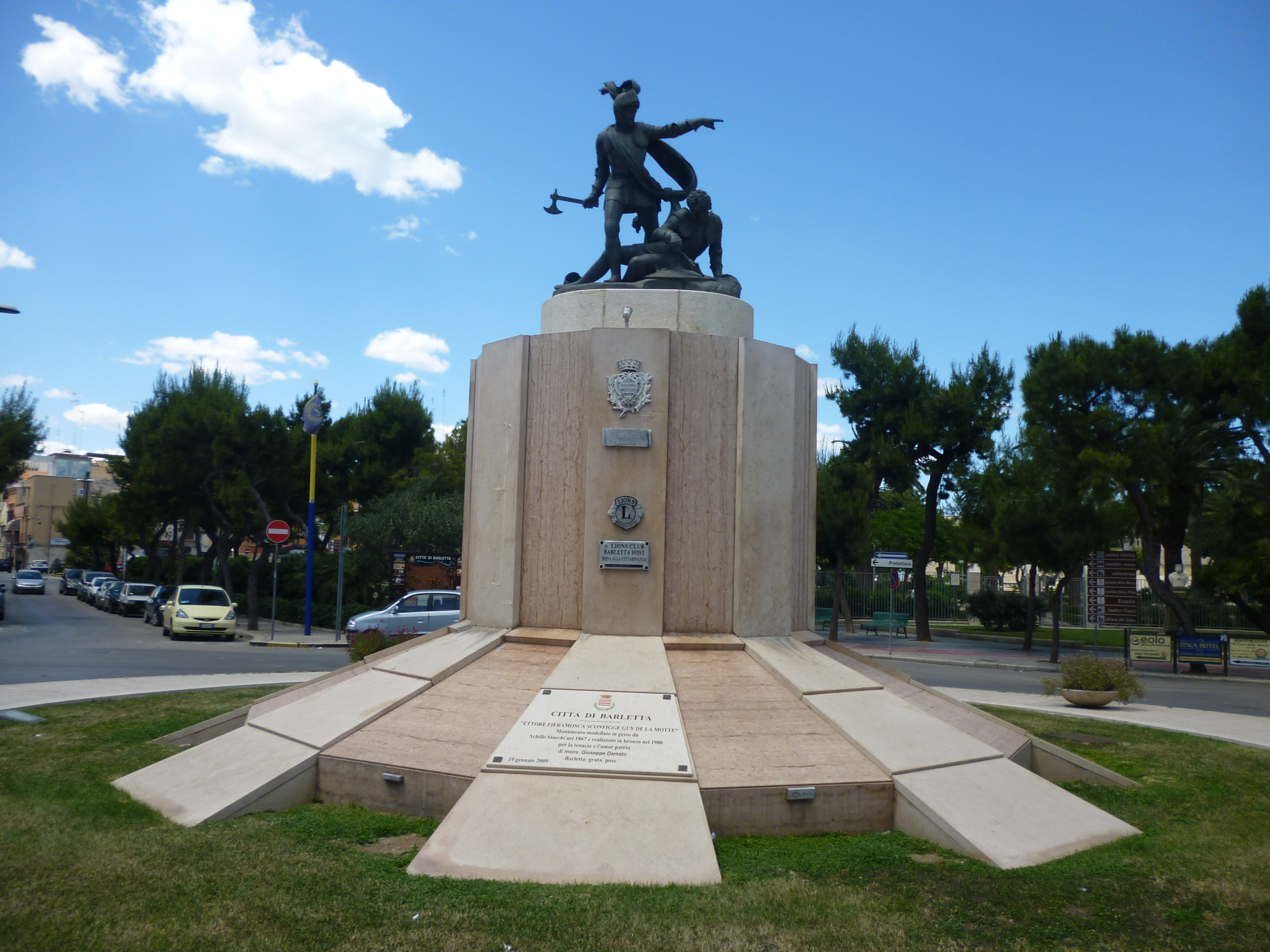
- The Challenge of Barletta – artistic depiction of the 1503 event
| Date | 13 February 1503 |
| Location | Barletta, Kingdom of Naples |
| Result | Italian victory |

Belligerents
| Kingdom of Naples (Italian knights) | French knights |

Commanders and leaders
| Francesco II del Balzo; Ettore Fieramosca | Charles de la Motte |

Strength
| 13 Italian knights | 13 French knights |

Casualties and losses
| Minimal | Minimal |
- None reported for civilians

The Challenge of Barletta (Italian: Disfida di Barletta) originated from an episode that took place inside the Cantina della Sfida, around February 1503. The event saw thirteen Italian knights confront thirteen French knights. The encounter ended with the victory of the Italians, who triumphantly returned to Barletta, bringing the defeated French knights with them.

== Overview ==
The tournament was provoked by a French knight Charles de la Motte who, after drinking too much of the local wine, made disparaging remarks about the Italians. It consisted of a mounted tourney between 13 Italians (the most famous being Ettore Fieramosca), who were part of the Spanish army based in Barletta under Gonzalo Fernández de Córdoba, and 13 French knights who were based in Canosa di Puglia. The Italian knights won the battle, and the French had to pay ransom. Barletta has since acquired the appellation Città della Disfida (City of the Challenge) as a result.

The event inspired a historical novel by the Italian writer Massimo D'Azeglio, Ettore Fieramosca, or La disfida di Barletta, written in 1833. A comedic version of the fight is also depicted in the 1976 Italian comedy film Il Soldato di Ventura.

== Challenge ==
=== Cause of the challenge ===
French troops made an incursion up to Canosa di Puglia, where they had a small fight with Spanish troops. A few French soldiers were taken prisoner and were brought to Barletta. Among the French prisoners there was the nobleman Charles de Torgues, also known as Monsieur Guy de la Motte.

On 15 January 1503 the French prisoners were invited to take part to a banquet during which la Motte questioned the valor and courage of Italian soldiers, then allied with the Spaniards. An argument followed. To solve the question, the French waged a challenge according to specific rules set up by the French to show whether the Italians were up to the valor of French soldiers. The challenge consisted of a mounted tourney between 13 Italians (the most famous being Ettore Fieramosca), who were part of the Spanish army based in Barletta, and 13 French knights who were based in Canosa di Puglia. The number of 13 knights was set by la Motte, who believed that that would give to the Italians an opportunity to refuse the challenge because of the superstition associated with the number 13. The winners would receive as a bounty the weapons and the horses of the other army who had also to pay a ransom of 100 ducats for each knight (the gold value of 100 ducats is about US$15,000 in early 2018). Moreover, each army had to provide two hostages as a collateral. Prospero Colonna and Fabrizio Colonna were put in charge of making the Italian team. The captain of the Italians was Fieramosca.

=== Participants ===
For the two armies, the participants were as follows:

| Italian knights | Knights | | French knights |
|---|---|---|---|
| Italian knights | Ettore Fieramosca | Charles de Torgues | French knights |
| Italian knights | Francesco Salamone | Marc de Frigne | French knights |
| Italian knights | Marco Corollario | Girout de Forses | French knights |
| Italian knights | Riccio da Parma | Claude Grajan d'Aste † | French knights |
| Italian knights | Guglielmo Albimonte | Martellin de Lambris | French knights |
| Italian knights | Mariano Abignente | Pierre de Liaye | French knights |
| Italian knights | Giovanni Capoccio | Jacques de la Fontaine | French knights |
| Italian knights | Giovanni Brancaleone | Eliot de Baraut | French knights |
| Italian knights | Ludovico Abenevoli | Jean de Landes | French knights |
| Italian knights | Ettore Giovenale | Sacet de Sacet | French knights |
| Italian knights | Fanfulla da Lodi | François de Pise | French knights |
| Italian knights | Romanello da Forlì | Jacques de Guignes | French knights |
| Italian knights | Miale da Troia | Naute de la Fraise | French knights |

=== Competition judges ===
The field judges for the Italian faction were: Francesco Zurolo (or Zurlo), Diego Vela, Francesco Spinola, Alonzo Lopez; the French judges were: Lionnet Du Breuil, Monsieur de Murtibrach, Monsieur de Bruet, and Etum Sutte.

=== Hostages ===
The Italian hostages were Angelo Galeotta and Albernuccio, and the French hostages were Monsieur de Musnai and Monsieur de Dumoble.

== Gallery ==
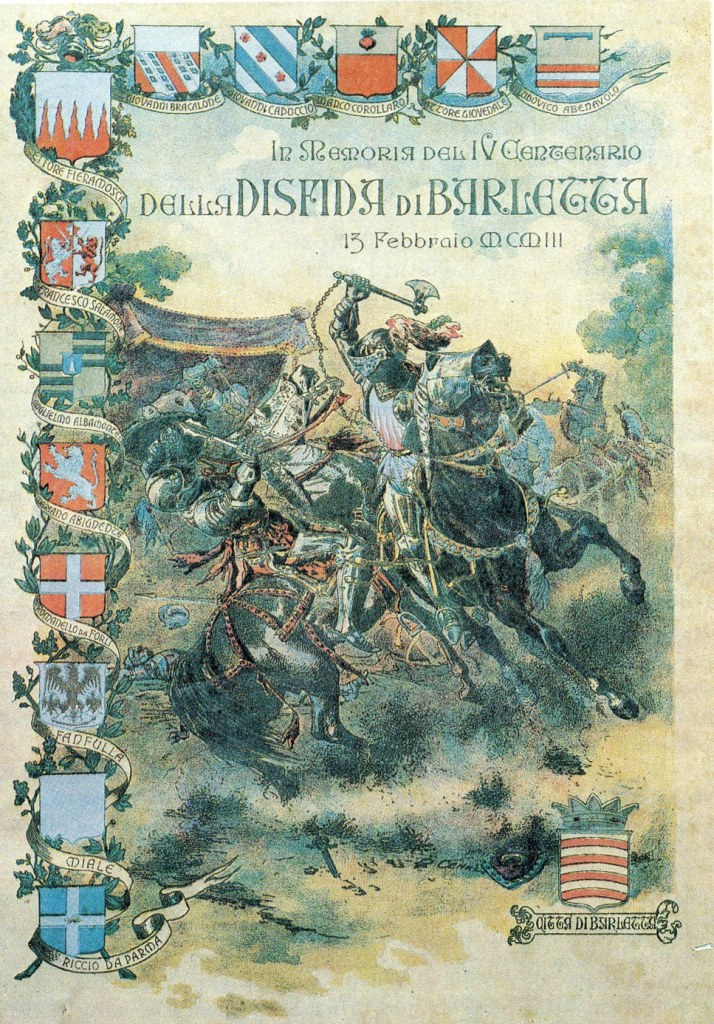
Commemorative poster for the fourth centennial of the Disfida

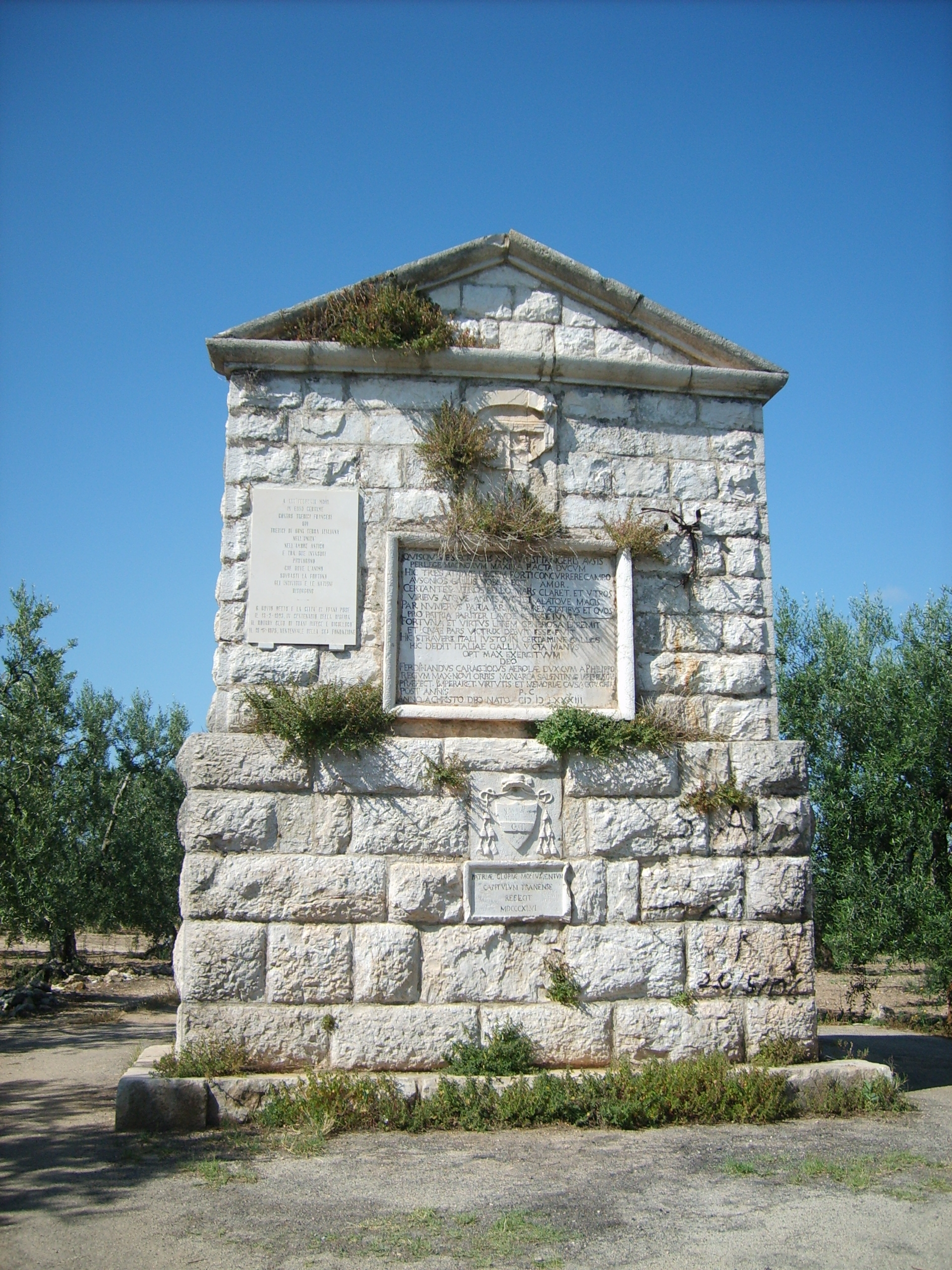
Epitaph for the Disfida on the battle site

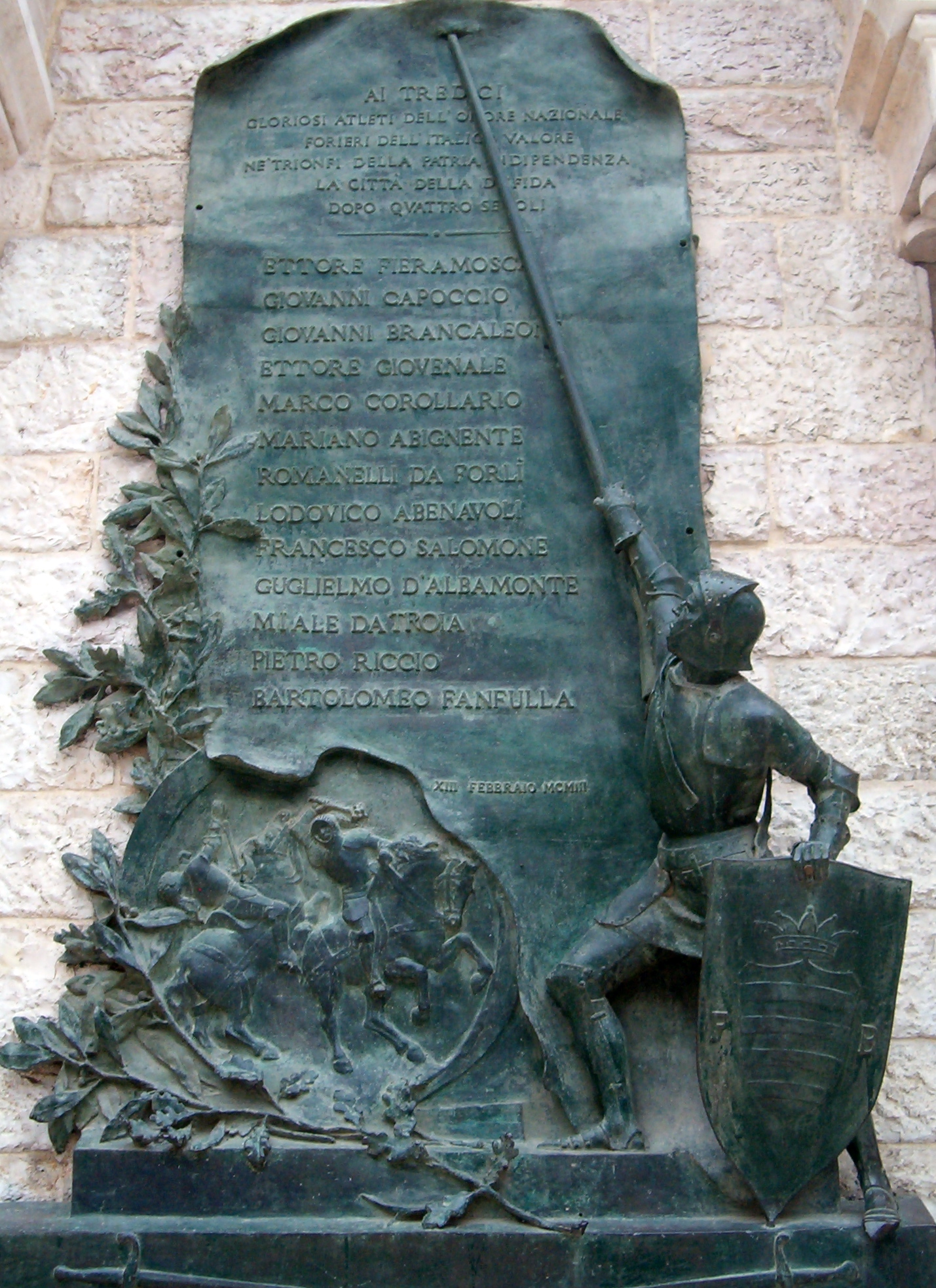
Detail of the monument in Barletta

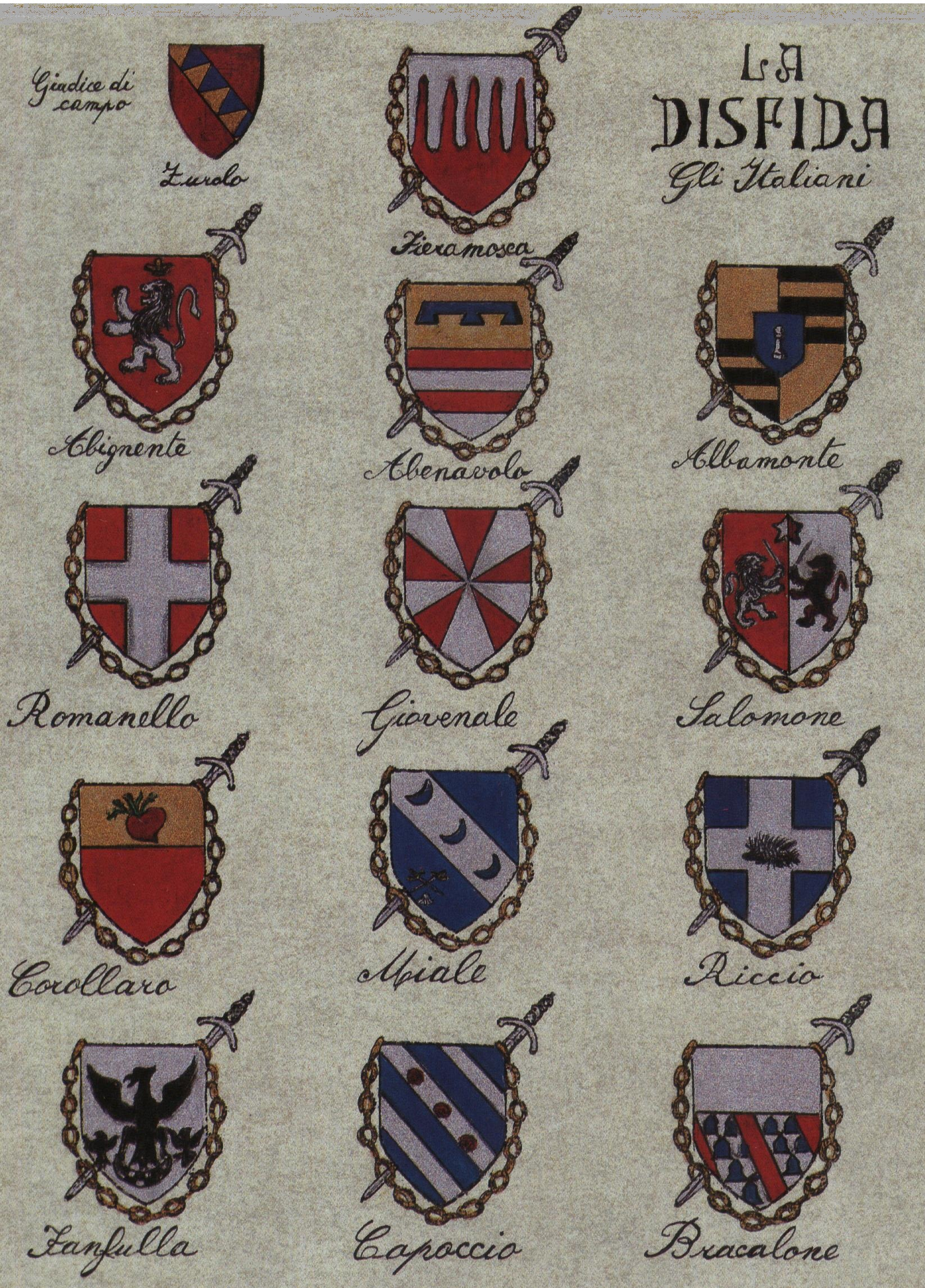
Names and coats of arms of the Italian knights who participated in the challenge of Barletta on 13 February 1503.

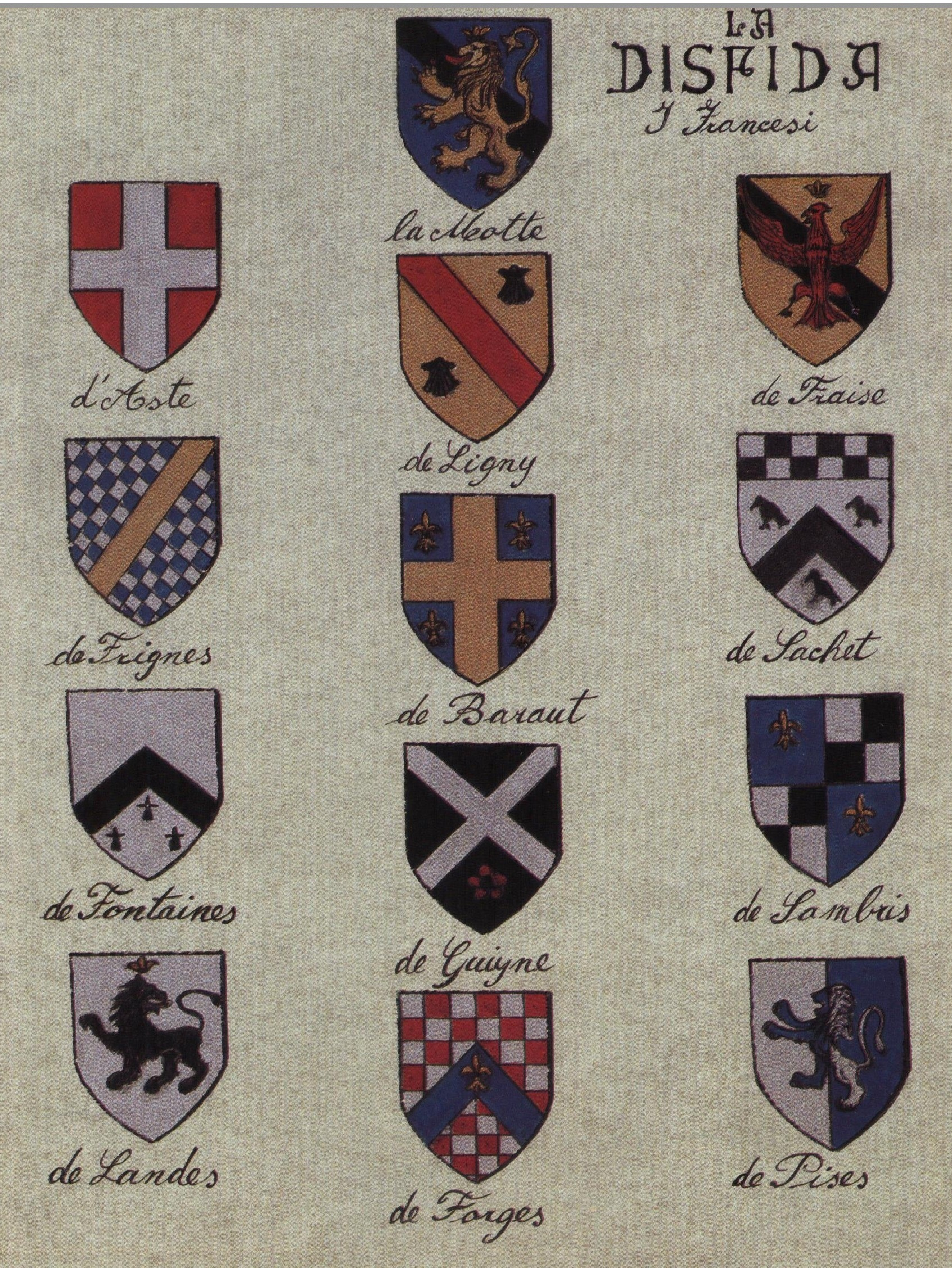
Names and coats of arms of the French knights who participated in the challenge of Barletta on 13 February 1503.

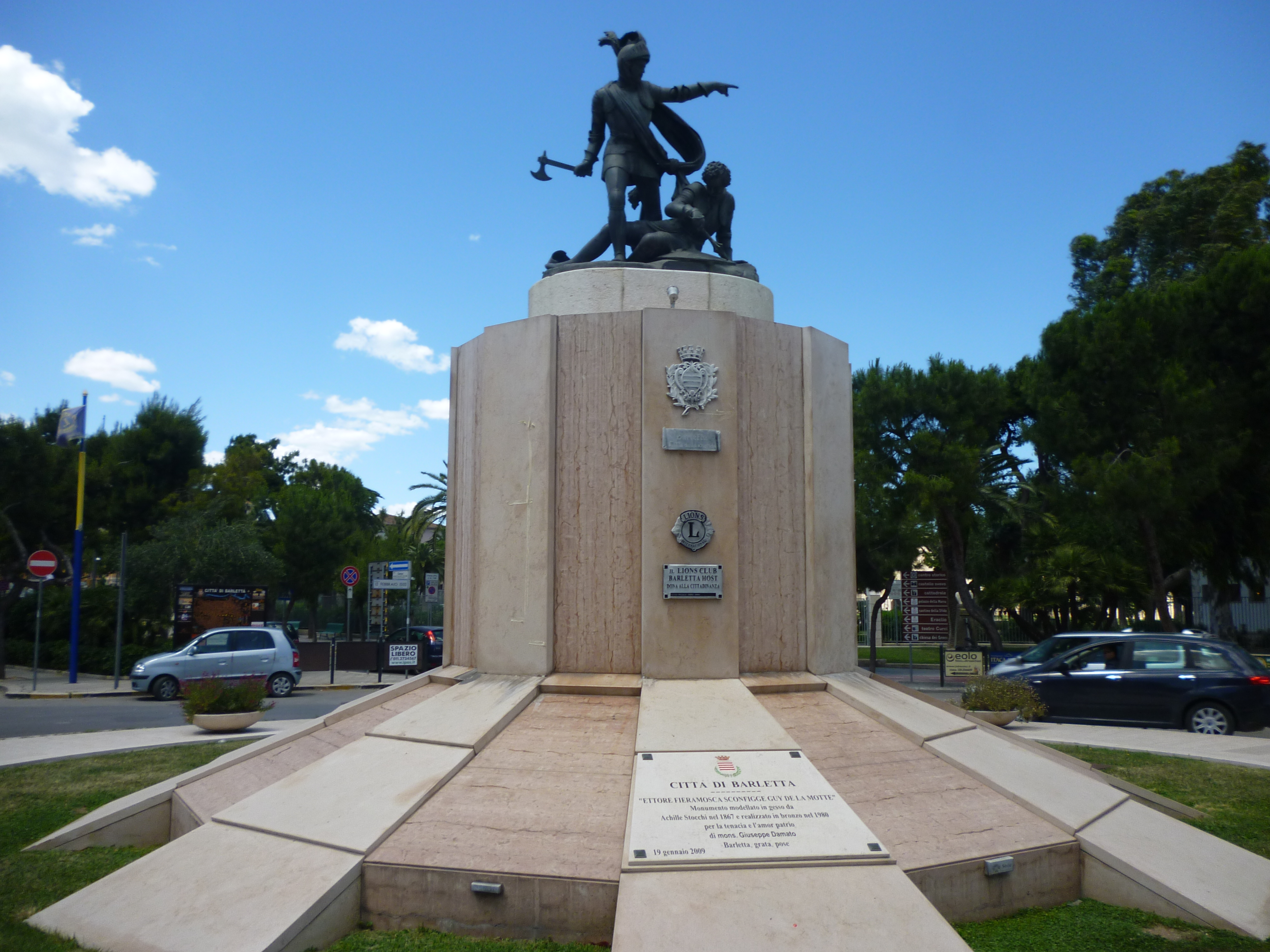
Monument in Barletta, which commemorates the challenge of the same name.

== See also ==
- Battle of Cerignola

== Bibliography ==
=== Historical sources ===
- Jean d'Auton (1834). Libreria Silvestre (ed.). Chroniques de Jean d'Auton [Chroniques de Jean d'Auton] (in French). Vol. 2. Parigi (75).
- Alfredo Franco; Felice Marciano; Gennaro Zurolo; Vincenzo Amoroso; et al. (Historical Studies Center HISTRICANUM, Municipality of Sarno (SA)-Culture Department (2003)) (2003). La Disfida 1503–2003 [The Challenge 1503–2003] (in Italian). Poggiomarino (NA): Centro Studi Storici HISTRICANUM.
- Simonis, Damien; et al. (January 2004). Lonely Planet's Italy (6th ed.). Lonely Planet Publications. pp. 659. ISBN 1-74104-303-4.
- Abenavoli, S.M. (2020). La disfida di Barletta : il normanno Ludovico Abenavoli Drengot : uno dei tredici campioni italiani della disfida [The challenge of Barletta : the Norman Ludovico Abenavoli Drengot : one of the thirteen Italian champions of the challenge] (in Italian). Catanzaro (CZ): La Rondine Edizioni. ISBN 978-88-322-6827-0.
- Gennaro Zurolo (2024). "Chapter V, part II". Casata Zurolo. Origini e sviluppo di una famiglia feudale del Meridione d'Italia [Zurolo House. Origins and development of a feudal family from Southern Italy] (in Italian). pp. 183, 184, 185 and 186.
