= Macchi M.53 =

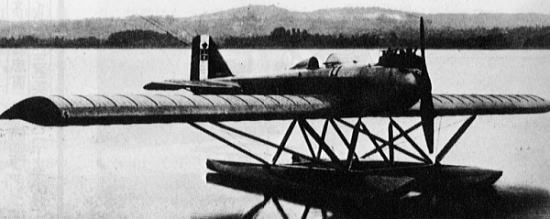

General information
- Type: Reconnaissance floatplane
- National origin: Italy
- Manufacturer: Macchi
- Primary user: Regia Marina

The Macchi M.53 was an Italian reconnaissance floatplane designed and built in the late 1920s by Macchi for the Regia Marina (Italian Royal Navy).

== Design and development ==
Macchi designed the M.53 to meet a Regia Marina requirement for a small reconnaissance seaplane that could operate from the large submarine Ettore Fieramosca. The aircraft had to be designed so that it could be stowed disassembled in a watertight, cylindrical hangar aboard the submarine. In order to minimize danger to the submarine and the aircraft during flight operations—which required Ettore Fieramosca to loiter on the surface while the aircraft was being assembled or disassembled—the aircraft also had to be designed so that it could be assembled quickly for flight operations and disassembled quickly after recovery for stowage in its hangar.

The M.53 was a single-seat low-wing monoplane floatplane with twin floats mounted beneath its fuselage. Its 60-kilowatt (80-horsepower) ADC Cirrus II engine drove a two-bladed propeller and gave it a top speed of 144 kilometers per hour (89.5 miles per hour).

== Operational history ==
The M.53 was among various small seaplanes considered for use aboard Ettore Fieramosca, which was commissioned in 1930. None of the aircraft were deployed aboard the submarine, and Ettore Fieramosca's hangar was removed in 1931.

== Operators ==
Kingdom of Italy

- Regia Marina

== Specifications (M.53) ==
Data from Jane's all the World's Aircraft 1928

General characteristics

- Crew: 1
- Length: 5.675 m (18 ft 7 in)
- Wingspan: 10.76 m (35 ft 4 in)
- Height: 2.75 m (9 ft 0 in)
- Wing area: 16 m^{2} (170 sq ft)
- Empty weight: 484 kg (1,067 lb)
- Gross weight: 684 kg (1,508 lb)
- Powerplant: 1 × ADC Cirrus II 4-cyl. air-cooled in-line piston engine, 60 kW (80 hp)
- Propellers: 2-bladed fixed pitch propeller

Performance

- Maximum speed: 144 km/h (89 mph, 78 kn)
- Stall speed: 75 km/h (47 mph, 40 kn)
- Endurance: 4 hours
- Time to altitude: 1,000 m (3,300 ft) in 12 minutes
- Wing loading: 42.7 kg/m^{2} (8.7 lb/sq ft)
- Power/mass: 0.0875 kW/kg (0.0532 hp/lb)

== See also ==
- Italian submarine Ettore Fieramosca

Aircraft of comparable role, configuration, and era

- Piaggio P.8

Related lists

- List of seaplanes and flying boats

== Bibliography ==
- Passingham, Malcolm (February 2000). "Les hydravions embarqués sur sous-marins" [Submarine-carried Seaplanes]. Avions: Toute l'aéronautique et son histoire (in French) (83): 7–17. ISSN 1243-8650.
