= Ettore Fieramosca =

Italian condottiero and nobleman

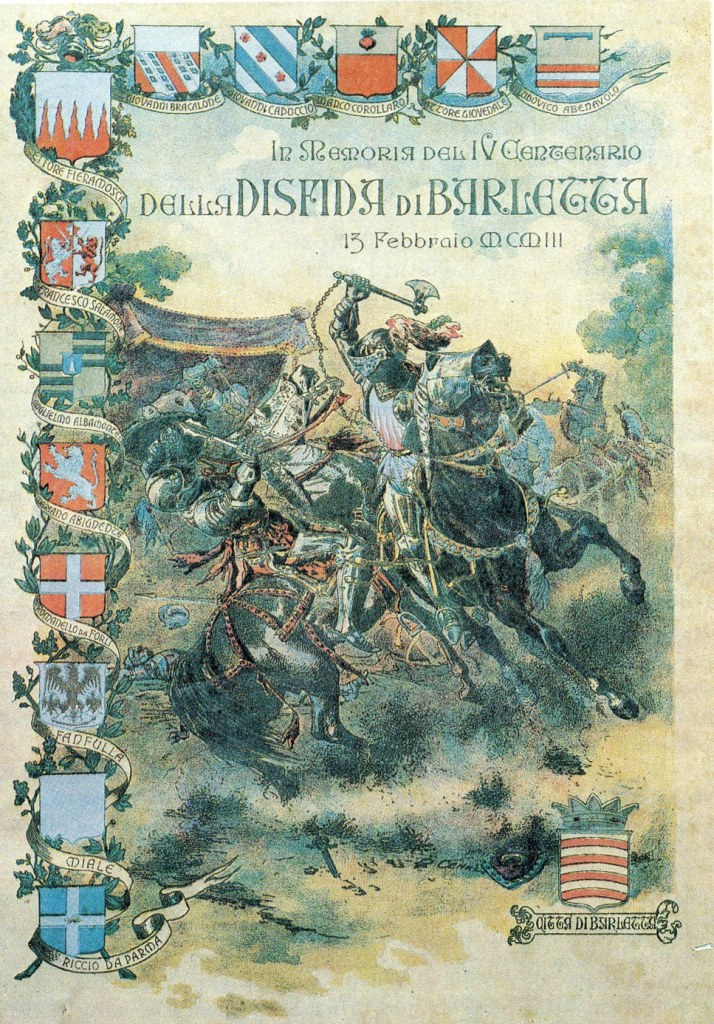
Ettore Fieramosca in La disfida di Barletta

Ettore Fieramosca (born Ferramosca) (1476 in Capua – 20 January 1515 in Valladolid) was an Italian condottiero and nobleman during the Italian Wars. His father was Rainaldo, baron of Rocca d'Evandro, and it is thought that his mother was a noblewoman from the Gaetani family. The family inherited and occupied the Castle of Mignano.

== Biography ==
Ettore served as a page to Ferdinand I of Naples and later became a condottiero for Ferdinand II. As such he fought against Charles VIII of France in 1493, during the French invasion of Italy. He continued to serve Frederick IV against the kings of France and Spain, but after Frederick's defeat in 1501, he turned to serve Prospero Colonna against France for Spain in the Battle of Cerignola. In 1503 he led thirteen Italian knights to victory over thirteen French in the Challenge of Barletta (Disfida di Barletta). Later he served Ferdinand the Catholic, king of Spain, who made him count of Miglionico. Because he was stripped of some of his fief, he fought once more against Spain and France under the Republic of Venice and Fabrizio Colonna. In 1512 he fought at the Battle of Ravenna. Reconciled with Ferdinand, he died in Spain in 1515.

== Legacy ==
During the Risorgimento and the rise of Fascism, he was presented as a national hero and became the subject of national celebrations. Massimo D'Azeglio wrote an 1833 novel Ettore Fieramosca, in an effort to boost Italian patriotism.

In 1909 and again in 1915, he was the main subject of two Italian silent films, both named Ettore Fieramosca. In 1938, during the Fascist era, Alessandro Blasetti directed a sound film Ettore Fieramosca. A more comical depiction of Ettore was performed by Bud Spencer in the 1976 film Il Soldato di Ventura.

Two warships, the protected cruiser Ettore Fieramosca and the submarine Ettore Fieramosca, were named after him.

== Genealogy ==
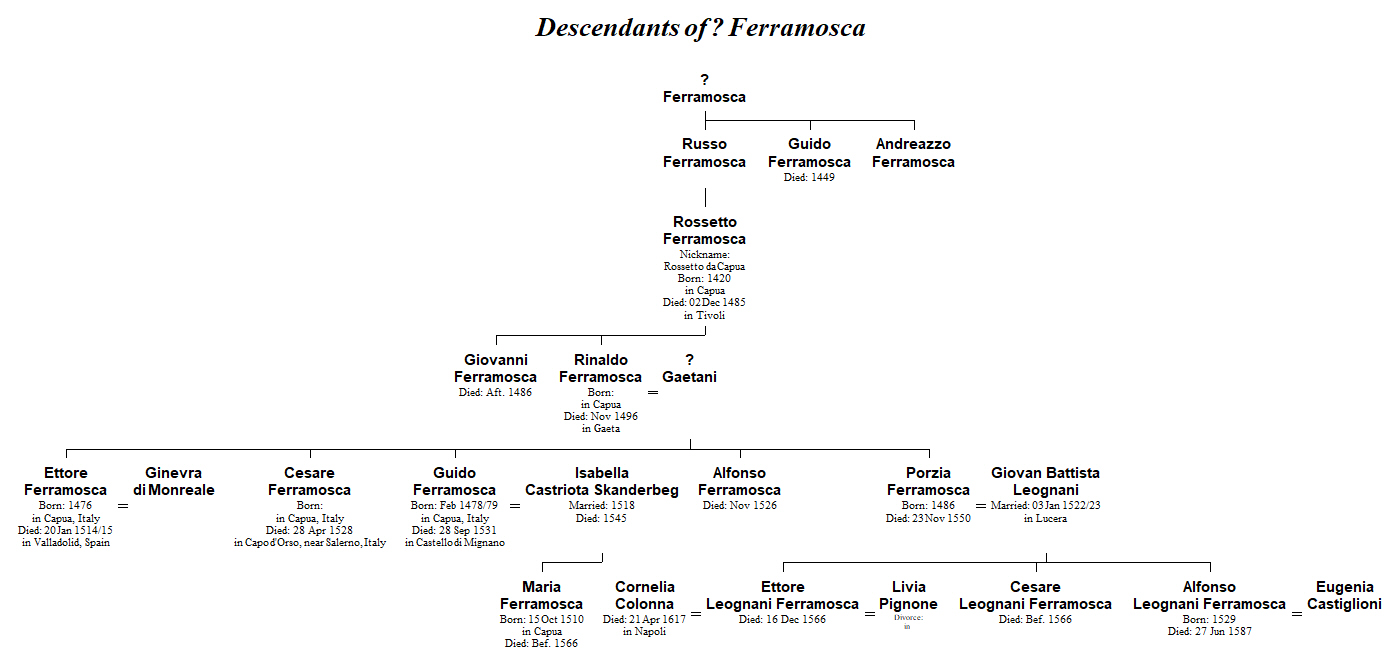
Ettore Ferramosca family tree

Ettore was born with the surname Ferramosca, inherited through his paternal line from his great-grandfather Russo Ferramosca, born before 1405. As a result of his defeat of the French at the Challenge of Barletta, the people referred to ("renamed") him as Fieramosca (fiera = proud) a term which became associated with him as his surname. His family tree is shown on the right.

Between the early 15th century until the Council of Trent (1545-1563), Italians added surnames to record baptisms, marriages and deaths and to monitor marriages between blood relatives. Most surnames were adopted from a person's trade, profession, place of birth or that of a famous person. Some decided to take on the name of their hero, as "Ferramosca" or "Fieramosca". These families grew in the provinces of Potenza, Lecce, Pescara and Veneto, with Fieramosca predominant in Sicily.
