= Ettore Fieramosca (novel) =

1833 novel by Massimo D'Azeglio

- Title page for Ettore Fieramosca (4th edition 1856)
- Author: Massimo D'Azeglio
- Language: Italian
- Genre: Historical
- Publication date: 1833
- Publication place: Italy
- Media type: Print

== Publishing History ==
In 1830, while in Turin painting a work depicting the legendary clash between the French and the Italians known as the "Challenge of Barletta" D'Azeglio conceived the idea for a historical novel based on these events. He read the initial passages to his cousin, Cesare Balbo, who encouraged him to continue.

D'Azeglio proceeded to write the novel during his stay in Milan, which began that same year. He held the conviction that the initiatives of Young Italy and other pro-independence organizations were insufficient to mobilize the Italian people against Austria. Instead, he believed that culture and art could help forge an Italian national consciousness by highlighting moments of national pride such as the Challenge of Barletta.

Indeed, that year, D'Azeglio exhibited a series of paintings with patriotic themes at the Brera Academy, including the aforementioned Challenge of Barletta and The Battle of Legnano. During the writing process, he shared a draft of the novel with his friend Tommaso Grossi and his father in law, Alessandro Manzoni, both of whom responded favorably. Bolstered by this encouragement, D'Azeglio had the completed work printed at a shop on Via San Pietro all'Orto.

Sales of the first edition proved quite successful, earning the author an initial profit of 5,000 francs, in addition to covering the costs owed to the printing house. In the months that followed, the novel achieved enormous success, so much so that some newspapers even suggested it might be the work of Manzoni and further reprints were issued.

== Film adaptations ==
The novel inspired three separate films, including two silent films released in 1909 and 1915. During the Fascist era, with Fieramosca being actively promoted by the state as hero, a fresh film version was made in 1938 by the leading filmmaker Alessandro Blasetti.

== Bibliography ==
- Bondanella, Peter E. Italian Cinema: From Neorealism to the Present. Bloomsbury Publishing, 2001.
- Casillo, Robert. The Empire of Stereotypes: Germaine de Staël and the Idea of Italy. Palgrave Macmillan, 2006
