= Italian submarine Ettore Fieramosca =

Italian submarine

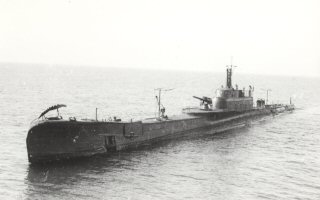
- Italian submarine Ettore Fieramosca

History

Kingdom of Italy
- Name: Ettore Fieramosca
- Namesake: Ettore Fieramosca
- Builder: Tosi (Taranto, Italy)
- Laid down: 1926
- Launched: 15 April 1929
- Commissioned: 1930
- Decommissioned: 1941
- Fate: Scrapped

General characteristics
- Type: Submarine/Submarine aircraft carrier/Submarine cruiser
- Displacement: 1,530 tons (surface); 2,094 tons (submerged)
- Length: 83.97 m (275.5 ft)
- Beam: 8.30 m (27.2 ft)
- Draught: 5.11 m (16.8 ft)
- Propulsion: (surfaced/submerged) diesel / electric, 2 shafts; 3,900 kW (5,200 hp) / 1,700 kW (2,300 hp)
- Speed: 15 kn (28 km/h; 17 mph) (surfaced); 8 kn (15 km/h; 9.2 mph) (submerged)
- Range: 5,000 nmi (9,300 km) at 9 knots (17 km/h)
- Test depth: 100 metres (330 ft)
- Complement: 78
- Armament: 1 × 120 mm (4.7 in) gun; 4 × 13.2 mm machine guns; 8 × 533 mm (21 in) torpedo tubes (4 bow, 4 stern); 14 torpedoes
- Aircraft carried: 1 seaplane (planned, not operated)
- Aviation facilities: hangar (removed 1931)

Ettore Fieramosca was an Italian submarine which served with the Regia Marina in World War II. She was named after Ettore Fieramosca, an Italian condottiero of the 16th century.

== Design ==
Ettore Fieramosca was designed by the firm Bernardis and was intended to be a cruiser submarine which carried a seaplane in a waterproof hangar and a 203 mm (8 in) gun; such a design was inspired by the similar (although bigger) Surcouf, then under construction in France. Several prototype seaplanes were designed but not deployed, and the hangar was removed in 1931. The deck gun was initially a 120 mm (5 in) 27-calibre OTO model of 1924, but this was later replaced by a 120 mm 45-calibre OTO model of 1931.

However Ettore Fieramosca proved to be rather over-dimensioned for her armament, slower than intended—the intended speed of 20 knots (37 km/h; 23 mph) while surfaced was never achieved—with poor maneuverability, both surfaced and underwater, and relatively poor endurance. Due to the high cost and these shortcomings, plans to build additional boats using the same designs were shelved.

== Career ==
Ettore Fieramosca was built by Cantieri navali Tosi di Taranto. She was laid down in 1926, launched on 15 April 1929, and completed in 1930. During the Spanish Civil War, she unsuccessfully attacked the Republican light cruiser Méndez Núñez and the destroyers Sánchez Barcáiztegui and Gravina with three torpedoes on a patrol from 21 December 1936 to 5 January 1937. During a second patrol in February, the boat bombarded Barcelona with a total of 45 shells on the nights of 8/9 and 9/10 February, slightly damaging the 4,597-gross register ton (GRT) tanker SS Zorrosa on the second night.

Plagued by incidents and mechanical trouble throughout her career, she was deployed on only a few operational patrols in 1940 but achieved no successes against enemy targets.

She suffered a battery explosion late in 1940 and was decommissioned in April 1941; eventually, she was stricken and scrapped.

== See also ==
- Italian submarines of World War II
