= Giovanni De Briganti =

Italian World War I fighter pilot

- Born: 12 October 1892; Florence, Italy
- Died: 8 November 1937 (aged 45); Pisa, Italy
- Occupations: World War I fighter pilot Air racer Aerobatic pilot Test pilot

Giovanni De Briganti (12 October 1892 – 8 November 1937) was an Italian World War I fighter pilot, seaplane air racer of the 1920s, aerobatic pilot, and test pilot.

== Biography ==
De Briganti was born on 12 October 1892 in Florence, Italy to Pietro Guglielmo De Briganti (1857–1937) and Anna Novellucci ( ? – ?). In 1915 he finished his studies at the University of Pisa and joined the battalion of Carlo Montù's volunteers for World War I service. He was sent as a student pilot to the Mirafiori airfield, where he obtained his pilot's license, and then to France for aerobatic flight qualification on Nieuport 11 Bebé aircraft. Returning to Italy, he was promoted to second lieutenant in 1916 and was assigned to the 75th Squadron in the Italian Royal Army′s Corpo Aeronautico Militare ("Military Aviation Corps").

In March 1917 De Briganti transferred to the 77th Squadron under the command of Pier Ruggero Piccio where, for having achieved aerial victories, he was decorated with a Silver Medal of Military Valor. Promoted to lieutenant, he served as a flight instructor from the summer of 1918 to the summer of 1919 at the Furbara airfield, where he also trained American pilots.

World War I ended in November 1918. Discharged from military service in 1919, De Briganti went to work at Macchi in Varese. In 1920 he received a trophy at Monaco for setting an altitude record. Flying a Macchi M.16, he won the Coppa Mapelli ("Mapelli Cup"), a competition for small touring aircraft, in both 1920 and 1921, retiring the trophy. In 1921 he won the Lega ("League") Competition, the Lombardy Lakes Cruise, and the prestigious Schneider Cup seaplane race — held that year at Venice — flying a Macchi M.7bis at an average speed of 189.500 kilometres per hour (117.750 mph). In 1922 he won the Sesto San Giovanni aerobatics competition, the Como Aviation Day, and the Deutsch Cup.

From 1923 to 1924, De Briganti was director of the flying school for seaplanes at the Schiranna seaplane base, performing numerous delivery flights of aircraft to Spain. In 1924 he won the Italian Cup, flying a Macchi M.24 flying boat. After the development of the Macchi M.33 racing flying boat in 1925, he participated in that year′s Schneider Cup race — held in the United States at Baltimore, Maryland — finishing in third place in an M.33 at an average speed of 278.269 kilometres per hour (172.908 mph).

In 1926 De Briganti was employed as a test pilot by the Costruzioni Meccaniche Aeronautiche SA (CMASA) company of Marina di Pisa. At CMASA, he oversaw the preparation of transoceanic flights and carried out load tests of the Dornier Do J Wal ("Whale") twin-engine flying boat in 1930. In 1931 he took part in the "Wing Day" in Rome, putting on brilliant aerobatic performances.

On 26 February 1937, De Briganti piloted the prototype (MM.434) of the new Fiat G.50 Freccia ("Arrow") fighter on its first flight. He was killed on 8 November 1937 at the Pisa-San Giusto airfield while flying the second G.50 prototype (MM.435), which crashed after he made a high-speed pass at very low altitude.

== Personal life ==
De Briganti married Alda Ramelli (1905–1947). The couple had two sons, Guglielmo (1929–1973) and Andrea (1934–2017).

== Honors and awards ==

Silver Medal of Military Valor

Knight of the Order of the Crown of Italy

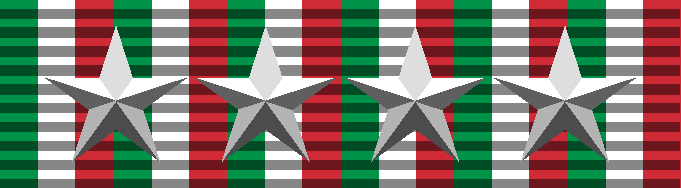

Commemorative Medal for the Italo-Austrian War 1915–1918 with four annual campaign stars

The citation for De Briganti′s Silver Medal of Military Valor reads:

As an airplane pilot, assigned to a fighter squadron, he always has shown himself to be very skilled, indefatigable, and daring. He distinguished himself on numerous and distant reconnaissance missions, successfully completing them, despite the intense fire of anti-aircraft batteries and the attacks of enemy fighter aircraft. On 19 August [1917], after a long and difficult struggle, an opponent's fighter aircraft fell near Voiscizza. Cielo di Adelberg, May 1917–Voiscizza, 19 August 1917.
