= Macchi (disambiguation) =

Macchi is an Italian surname.

Macchi may also refer to:

  - Aermacchi, a defunct aircraft manufacturer merged into Alenia Aermacchi
  - Macchi C.202 Saetta, fighter aircraft
  - Macchi C.202 Folgore, fighter aircraft
  - Macchi C.205 Veltro, fighter aircraft
  - Macchi M.39
  - Macchi M.B.308, light aircraft
  - Macchi M.C.72, experimental floatplane
  - Macchi MB1, three-wheeled truck

== See also ==
- Macchia (disambiguation)
- Machi
- Mocchi
