= Alessandro Tonini =

- Born: 1885; Cavarzere, Italy
- Died: 12 November 1932 (aged 46–47); Switzerland
- Occupation: Aeronautical engineer
- Years active: 1908–1929
- Employers: Gabardini; Macchi; IMAM

Alessandro Tonini (1885 – 12 November 1932) was an important Italian aeronautical engineer and aircraft designer of the early 20th century who worked for Gabardini, Macchi, and IMAM.

== Biography ==
Tonini was born in Cavarzere in the Province of Venice in Italy in 1885, the son of a civil engineer. Passionate about the world of aviation, he began his career as an aeronautical manufacturer in Milan in 1908 when he founded the Rebus Works for the construction of aircraft and aircraft engines.

Tonini's first creation was the Rebus engine, produced in two types. The first, delivering 40 to 45 horsepower (30 to 34 kW), was installed on the Wright biplane which Lieutenants Mario Calderara and Umberto Savoja flew during the "Brescia Week” competition, winning all the prizes for a domestically produced Italian apparatus. The second, delivering 70 horsepower (52 kW), was installed on the Rebus Works′ Monorebus monoplane, which made a flight of 15 kilometres (9.3 mi) over the Malpensa airfield in Milan in June 1910.

Together with Piero Bergonzi and Ippolito Negri, Tonini later designed two types of canard monoplane with a parasol wing, creating the world's first airplanes with a monocoque fuselage. One of the aircraft had a metal fuselage, and was powered by a 50-horsepower (37 kW) Le Rhône rotary engine, while the other was a two-seater of entirely wooden construction and powered by a 25-to-30-horsepower (19 to 22 kW) Anzani engine.

From 1912 to 1913, Tonini studied aeronautical construction at the Ecole Superiéure Aéronautique ("Advanced Aeronautical School") in Liège, Belgium. Returning to Italy, he worked for a short time at Gabardini, and then was hired as technical director at SIAI at Bovisio.

Some time later, Tonino moved, again as technical director, to the aeronautical works of Macchi in Varese. During World War I, he designed the Macchi M.7 fighter flying boat, the Macchi M.8 reconnaissance-bomber flying boat, the Macchi M.9 bomber flying boat, and the Macchi M.12 bomber flying boat, all of which saw use by Italian military forces during the war.

After the end of World War I, Tonini designed the Macchi M.14 fighter, the Macchi M.15, which saw service as a reconnaissance aircraft, bomber, and trainer aircraft, the Macchi M.16 civil sport aircraft, the Macchi M.17 racing flying boat, the Macchi M.18 bomber and civilian passenger flying boat, the Macchi M.20 two-seat civil trainer and touring aircraft, and the Macchi M.24 flying boat, which saw use as a bomber and torpedo plane and as a civilian passenger aircraft. Piloting an M.16 powered by a 30-horsepower (22 kW) Anzani engine, Giovanni De Briganti won the Coppa Mapelli ("Mapelli Cup") twice, in 1920 and 1921, retiring the trophy.

In 1926, Tonini moved to the Romeo Works in Naples to work for IMAM, where he designed the IMAM Ro.5 touring aircraft. The Ro.5 performed well during the International Challenges in 1929 and the Regia Aeronautica (Italian Royal Air Force) adopted it for use in liaison squadrons.

Tonini's health deteriorated in 1929, forcing him to leave his job at IMAM. He died in Switzerland due to illness on 12 November 1932.
