= Macchi M.19 =

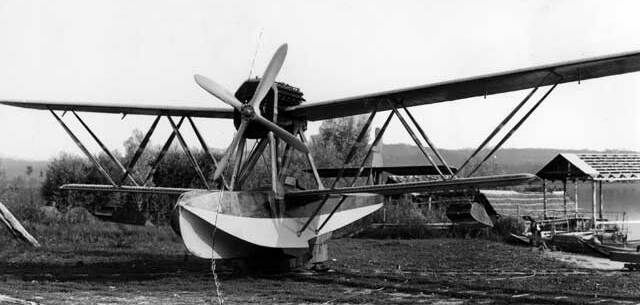

General information
- Type: Racing flying boat
- Manufacturer: Macchi
- Number built: 1

History
- First flight: 1920
- Retired: 1921

The Macchi M.19 was a 1920s Italian single-seat racing flying boat designed and built by Macchi for the 1920 Schneider Trophy race.

== Development ==
Based on the earlier Macchi M.17 racer the M.19 first flew in August 1920. It was designed to meet a new Schneider Trophy rule that each competitor should carry 300 kg (660 lb) of disposable load. It was a single-seat biplane flying boat with a 490 kW (650 hp) Fiat A.14 engine strut-mounted above the upper wing, driving a four-blade propeller in tractor configuration.

Early test flights showed a torque reaction from the powerful engine and the hull and rudder had to be redesigned. This resulted in the M.19 missing the 1920 Schneider race. The following year the weight rule was relaxed. In the 1921 race, the M.19 competed against two M.7s, but the M.19 had to be withdrawn after the 12th lap with a fractured crankshaft which ruptured a fuel line, causing the aircraft to catch fire.

== Specifications (M.19) ==
General characteristics

- Crew: one
- Wingspan: 15.86 m (52 ft 0.5 in)
- Powerplant: 1 × Fiat A.14 V12 in-line engine , 490 kW (650 hp)

Performance

- Maximum speed: 240 km/h (149 mph, 129 kn)

== See also ==
- Schneider Trophy

Related lists

- List of flying boats and floatplanes
