= Macchi M.C.73 =

1930s Italian aircraft

M.C.73
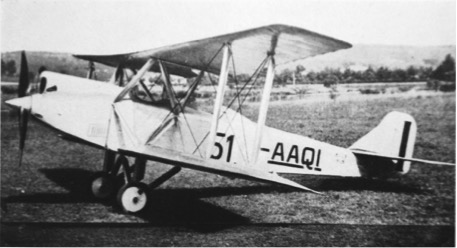

General information
- Type: Touring landplane / floatplane
- Manufacturer: Macchi
- Designer: Mario Castoldi
- Status: prototype only
- Number built: 2

History
- First flight: 1930

The Macchi M.C.73 was a two-seat touring landplane / floatplane built by Macchi in the early 1930s.

Intended to replace the Macchi M.70 from which it was derived, in 1931 the M.C.73 took part in the Giro d'Italia races. In addition to the M.C.73, 32 more aircraft took part in the race, which the M.C.73 won.

== Variants ==
M.C.73
Landplane version with conventional tail-wheel undercarriage.
M.C.73 Idro
Floatplane version with two strut-mounted floats.

== Specifications ==
Data from Macchi aircraft from 1912 to 1963

General characteristics

- Crew: 2
- Length: 7.45 m (24 ft 5 in)
- Wingspan: 9.55 m (31 ft 4 in)
- Height: 2.95 m (9 ft 8 in)
- Wing area: 23.3 m^{2} (251 sq ft)
- Empty weight: 485 kg (1,069 lb)
- Gross weight: 765 kg (1,687 lb)
- Powerplant: 1 × Colombo S.63 6-cylinder air-cooled in-line piston engine, 89 kW (120 hp)
- Propellers: 2-bladed fixed pitch propeller

Performance

- Maximum speed: 191 km/h (119 mph, 103 kn)
- Stall speed: 67 km/h (42 mph, 36 kn)
- Service ceiling: 6,250 m (20,510 ft)
