= Macchi M.12 =

M.12
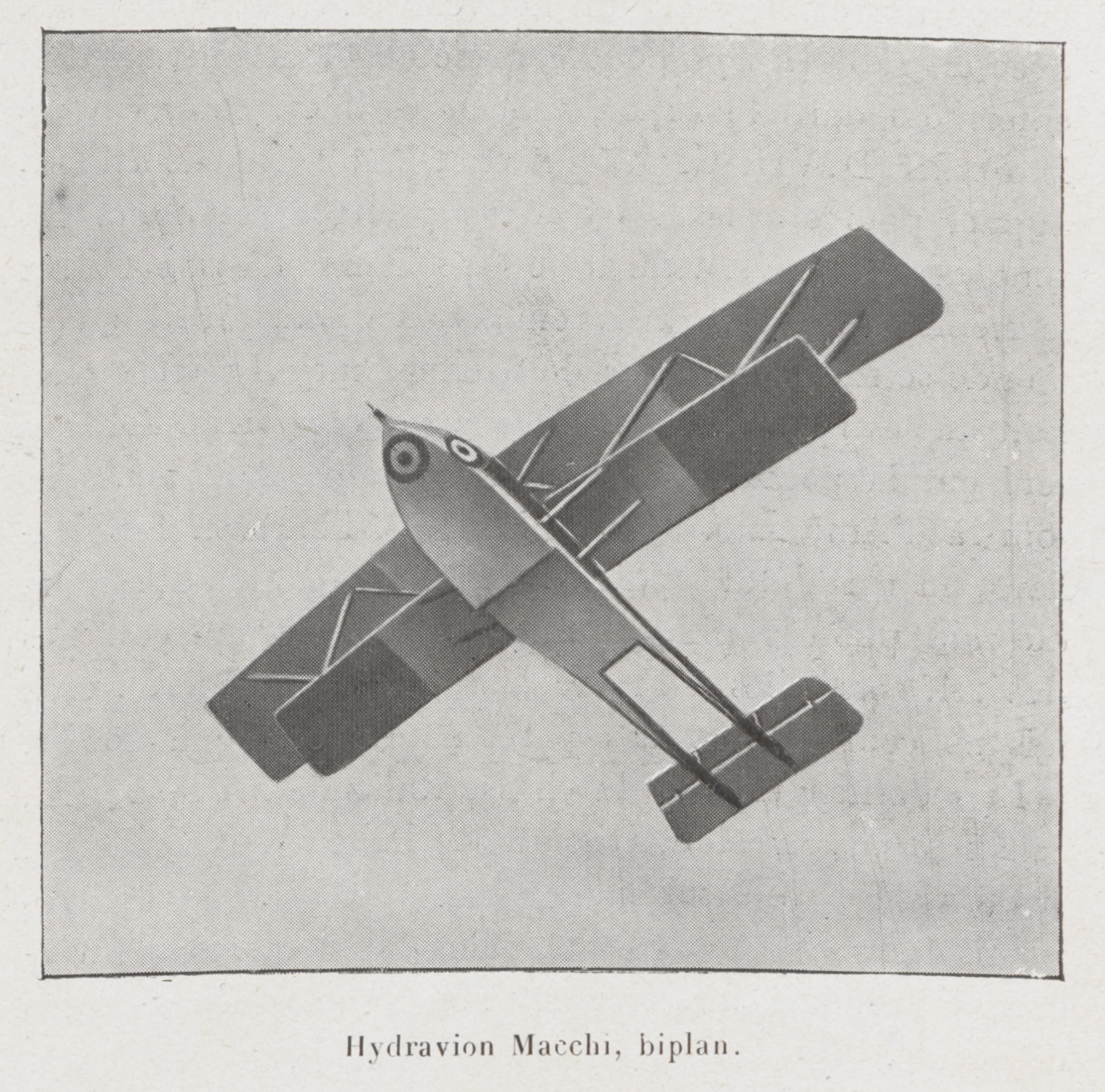

General information
- Type: Bomber flying boat
- National origin: Italy
- Manufacturer: Macchi
- Designer: Alessandro Tonini
- Number built: ca. 10

History
- First flight: 1918

The Macchi M.12 was a biplane flying boat bomber designed by Alessandro Tonini, and produced in small numbers by Macchi in Italy in 1918.

== Design and development ==
The M.12 had a conventional design, generally similar to an enlarged version of other Macchi designs of the period, and featured the Warren truss-style interplane struts that had been introduced on the Macchi M.9. A major difference however, was its twin-boom fuselage, each with a separate tailfin. An M.12 was entered in the Schneider Trophy race of 1920, but did not compete.

The M.12bis was a civil variant with five seats and a wingspan extended to 18 m (59 ft), intended to carry passengers and mail.

== Specifications ==
Data from Jane's All the World's Aircraft 1919, 391

General characteristics

- Crew: three
- Length: 10.77 m (35 ft 4 in)
- Wingspan: 17.00 m (55 ft 9 in)
- Height: 2.10 m (6 ft 11 in)
- Wing area: 61.0 m^{2} (656 sq ft)
- Empty weight: 1,750 kg (3,850 lb)
- Gross weight: 2,520 kg (5,540 lb)
- Powerplant: 1 × Ansaldo 4.E.28 , 336 kW (450 hp)

Performance

- Maximum speed: 190 km/h (120 mph, 100 kn)

== See also ==
Related lists

- List of flying boats and floatplanes
