= Macchi M.20 =

Single-engine biplane

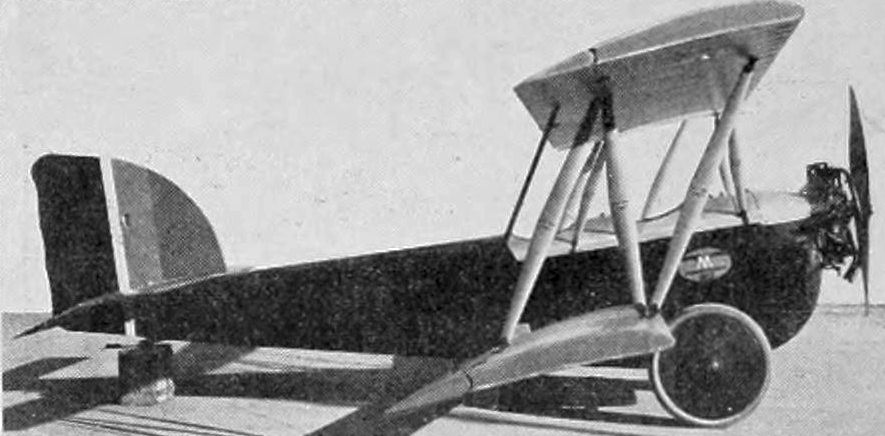
- Photograph of a Macchi M.20 in the 1 May 1926 issue of Aero Digest.

General information
- Type: Civil trainer
- National origin: Italy
- Manufacturer: Aeronautica Macchi
- Designer: Alessandro Tonini

History
- First flight: ca. 1919
- Retired: ca. 1940

The Macchi M.20 was a single-engine biplane trainer aircraft produced by the Italian aeronautical company Aeronautica Macchi between the end of the 1910s and the beginning of the 1920s.

Produced in small numbers and intended for the civil aviation market, the M.20 was developed in parallel with the Macchi M.16, a single-seat civil sport plane.

== Development history ==
When military production orders disappeared at the end of World War I in November 1918, the Macchi technical office, under the direction at the time of the aeronautical engineer Alessandro Tonini, began the development of two new light aircraft models for the civil aviation market. The two aircraft were the M.16, intended for recreational aviation, and the M.20, equipped with dual controls and suitable for pilot training. The M.16 and M.20 had a common design origin and identical configurations as single-engine biplanes with fixed landing gear.

== Technical description ==
The M.20 was a conventional aircraft for its time: a single-engine, two-seat biplane with fixed landing gear. The narrow-track landing gear had internal shock absorbers. The M.20 had a deep fuselage of a wooden lattice structure that was free of tensioners and metal cables, eliminating the need to adjust tie rods. Its dual controls were disengagable. The limited power of its 34-kilowatt (45-horsepower) engine affected its performance despite its low empty weight, described as 250 and 340 kilograms (551 and 750 lb) by different sources.

In 1925, when Mario Castoldi took over the role of technical director at Macchi, the M.20 was redesigned with a thicker airfoil and ailerons added to its upper wings. The new features could be backfitted onto existing M.20s.

One M.20 was experimentally equipped with floats for operation as a floatplane.

== Operational use ==
The Macchi M.20 first flew soon after the end of World War I. Competing in the civilian marketplace with a glut of surplus military aircraft in the aftermath of World War I, the M.20 had limited commercial success and was produced only in small numbers. Both individuals and flying clubs operated M.20 aircraft, and the type remained in service until around the time of Italy's entry into World War II in 1940.

On 12 October 1924, an M.20 piloted by Giovanni De Briganti won the Coppa Italia ("Italian Cup") race, run on the circuit Ciampino–Montecelio–Centocelle.

== Surviving example ==
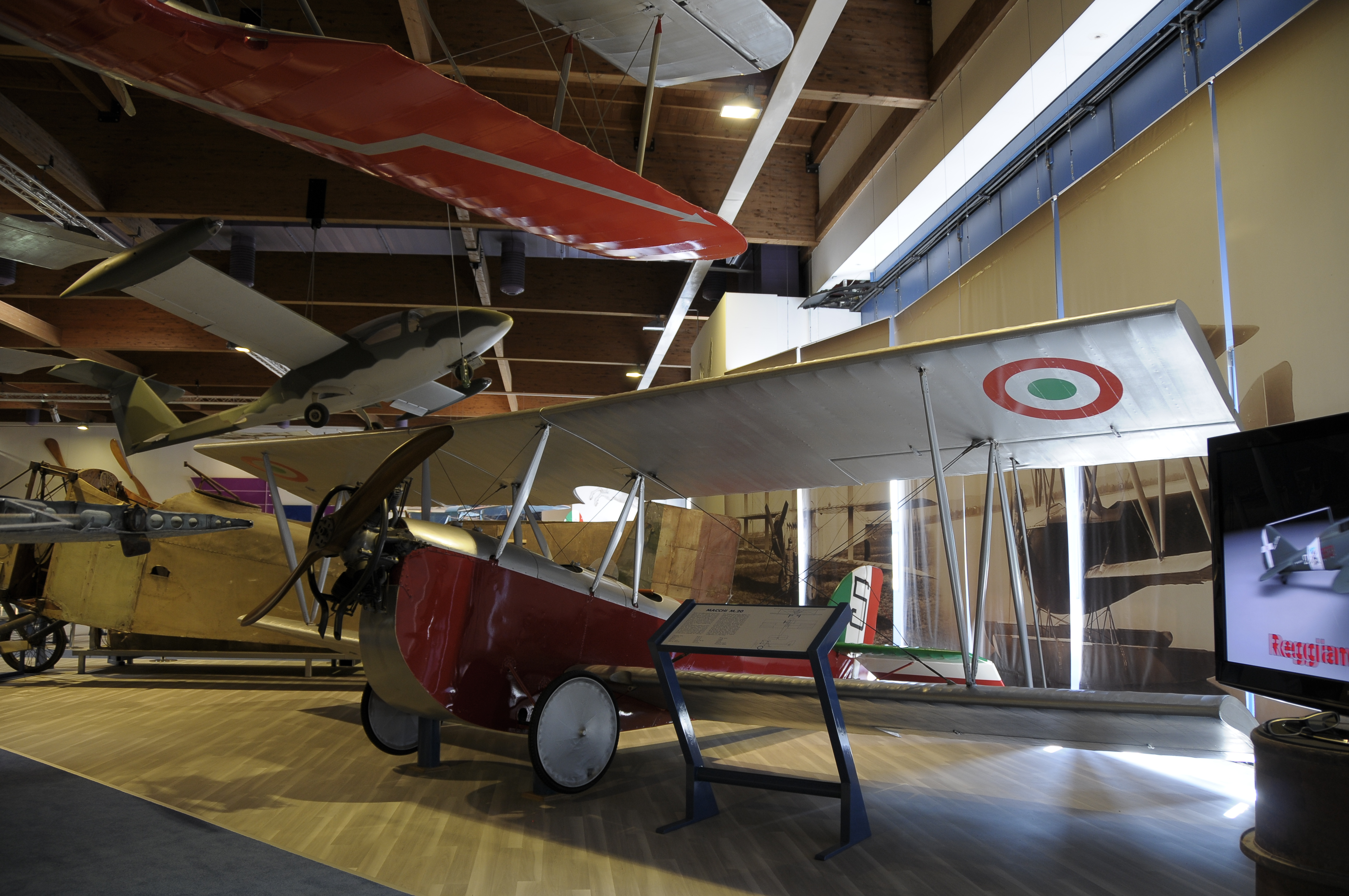
A restored Macchi M.20 on display in the main hall at the Gianni Caproni Museum of Aeronautics in Trento, Italy, on 5 July 2011.

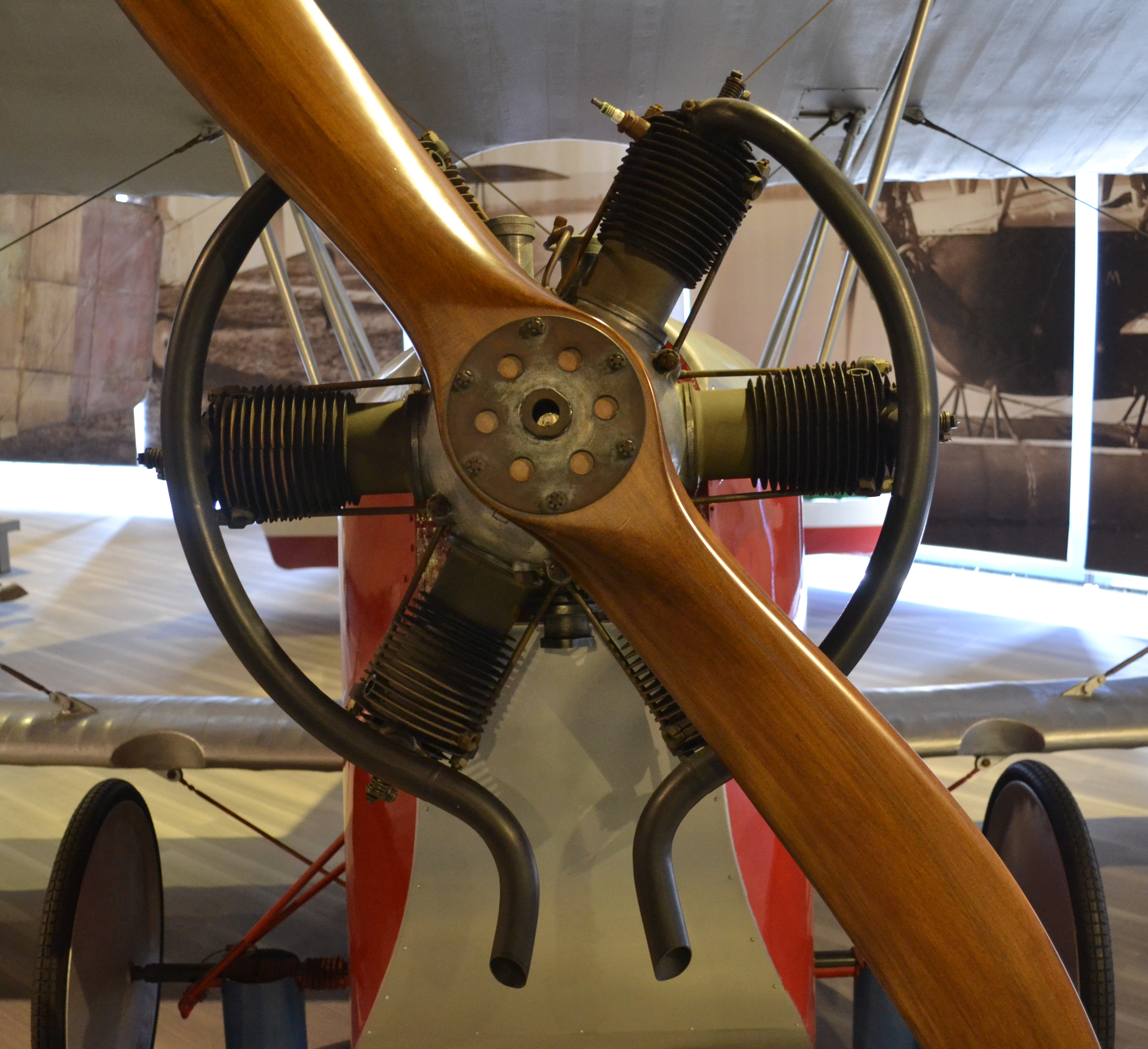
Close-up of the Anzani radial engine of the restored Macchi M.20 at the Gianni Caproni Museum of Aeronautics in Trento, Italy, on 23 August 2012.

An M.20 on display at the Gianni Caproni Museum of Aeronautics in Trento, Italy, is as of 2012 the oldest surviving example of an original Macchi-designed aircraft in Italy. Probably built sometime between 1920 and 1925, it subsequently was modified with the new wings and ailerons introduced in 1925. The Società Anonima Aerocentro Emiliano purchased it in 1929, installed a Salmson 9 AD engine in it, and in March 1930 registered it as I-AABO. The Aero Club of Rimini purchased it in September 1933, and subsequently it was written off after an accident. The Milanese aeronautical engineer and aircraft manufacturer Piero Magni purchased it, and in 1939 he modified it, giving it rounded and elongated wing tips, enlarged cockpits, and different fletchings, but in its modified form it did not receive a certificate of airworthiness.

The Caproni brothers acquired the aircraft's fuselage and wings from the aeronautical engineer and aviation pioneer Pier Carlo Bergonzi during the 1950s, and it became part of the collection of the Gianni Caproni Museum of Aeronautics during the 1970s. It underwent restoration by the Masterfly company between 1988 and 1990. It is painted in the markings of an unregistered M.20 racer of the 1924–1925 period.

== Operators ==
Kingdom of Italy

- Private users

== Specifications ==
Data from Macchi M.20

General characteristics

- Crew: 2
- Length: 5.75 m (18 ft 10 in)
- Wingspan: 8.00 m (26 ft 3 in)
- Height: 2.30 m (7 ft 7 in)
- Empty weight: 250 kg (551 lb)
- Powerplant: 1 × Anzani 6-cylinder air-cooled radial piston engine, 34 kW (45 hp)
- Propellers: 2-bladed fixed-pitch wooden propeller

Performance

- Maximum speed: 126 km/h (78 mph, 68 kn)

== See also ==
Related development

- Macchi M.16
