= Bremach =

Former Italian tactical truck manufacturer

Bremach Industrie s.r.l.
- Type: Società a responsabilità limitata
- Industry: Manufacturing
- Founded: 1956 in Varese as a Fratelli Brenna
- Defunct: 2018 (Insolvency) (U.S. operations are suspended as of March 2022)
- Headquarters: Castenedolo, Brescia, Italy
- Area served: Europe, Russia, Middle East, United States
- Key people: Gianfranco Mandano
- Products: Heavy commercial vehicles, medium commercial vehicles, light commercial vehicles, special vehicles, firefighting vehicles, defence vehicles
- Number of employees: 30 (2015)

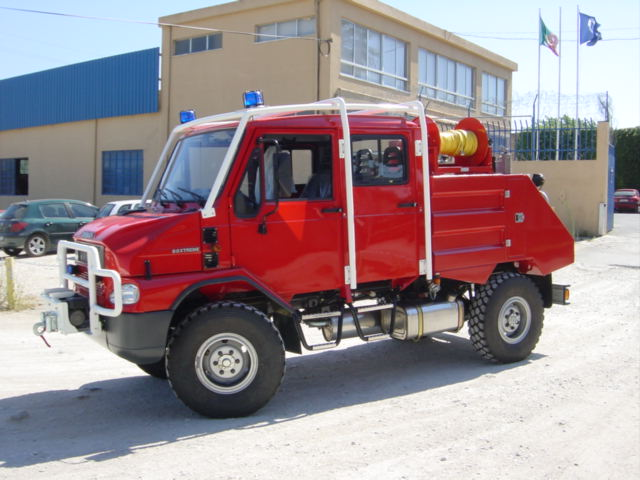
Bremach fire engine.

Bremach was an Italian/American manufacturer of tactical trucks specializing in the manufacturing of military vehicles and 4WD fire engines.

== History ==
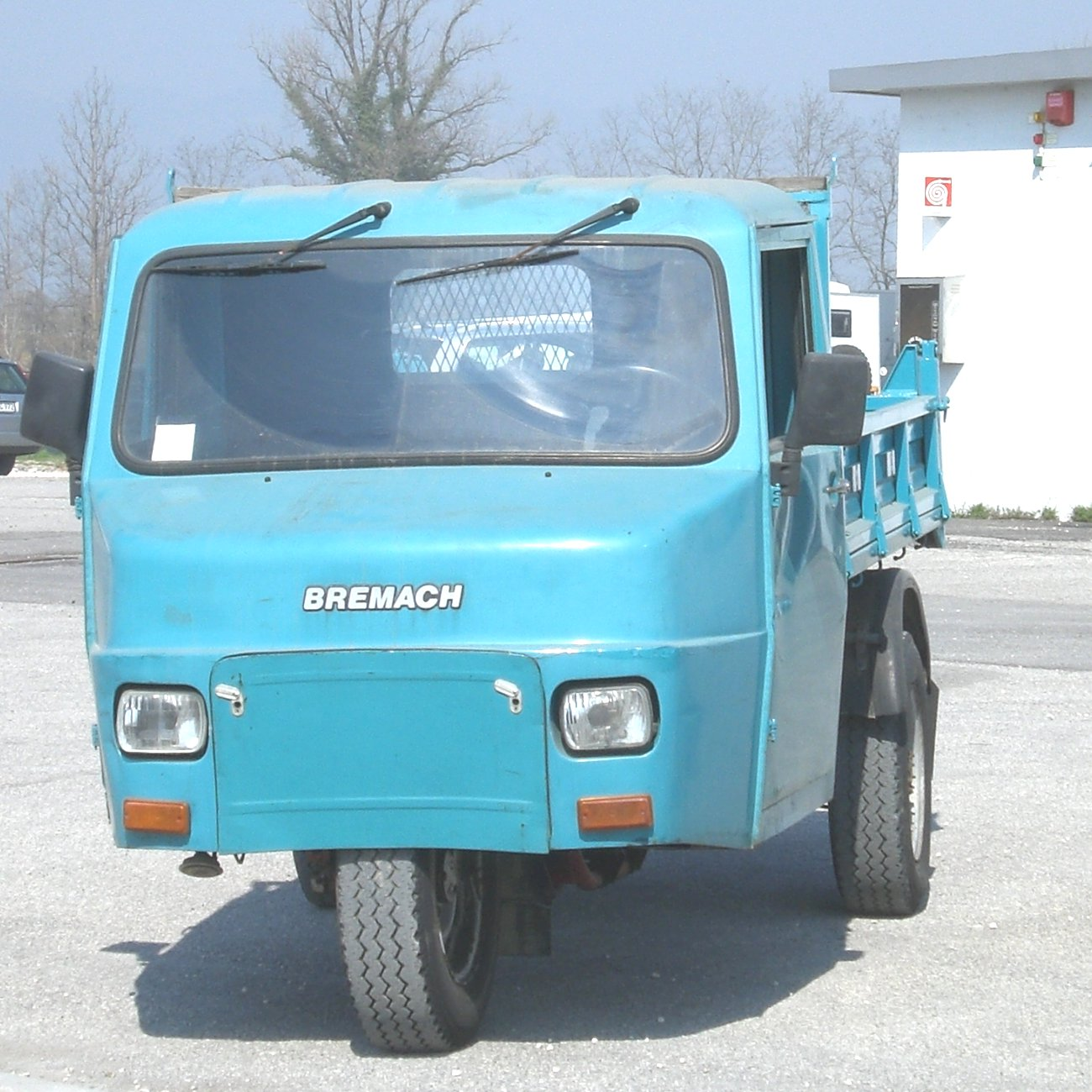
Macchi MB1 — produced by Bremach

Bremach was founded in 1956 in the city of Varese (northern Italy) by the Brenna brothers, the owners of a repair workshop. They purchased the license for the production of the three-wheeler Macchi MB1 motorcycle from Aermacchi. The name Bremach was formed by the combination of BREnna and MAcCHi.

In 1983 the company began production of its most famous car series, the Bremach GR (4x4). It includes a unified multi-purpose, all-wheel drive car bonnet GR35 and GR45 full weight of 3.5-4.5 with a four-cylinder 2.5-liter diesel engine Iveco (with turbo charging - 103 hp).

In 1993, Bremach launched a low-frame chassis BRIO (Brio) 4x2 with 75 hp engine for municipal services. With an overall height (1820 mm), it allows for use in low, or confined areas.

By 2000, Bremach Industry was facing financial difficulties, and it was decided to merge with the companies Pro. DE and Valsella Meccanotecnica.

From 2001 to 2002, Bremach offered a new all-wheel drive Bremach Family Extreme (Extreme). Technically, the new machines Bremach Brick and Extreme (4x4) do not differ from the previous series of GR. They were still equipped with the 2.8-liter diesel engine Iveco 8140.43 with direct fuel injection and turbocharging, and developed 105 hp. They complied with Euro-3 emission standards.

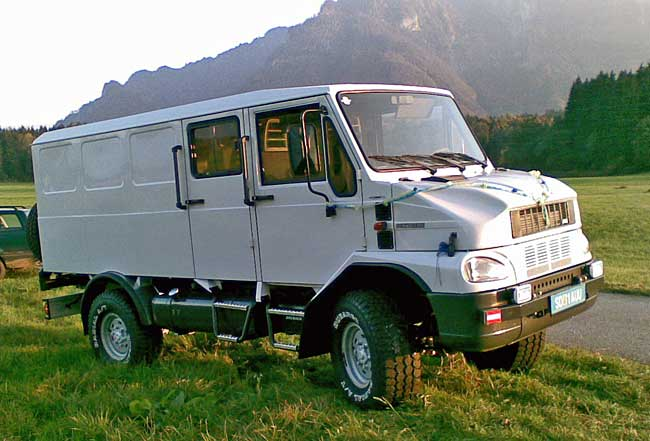
Bremach Job

Since 2006, Bremach offered a completely redesigned range of cars: Brick, Extreme and Job with updated cabins, a streamlined front fascia with round plastic hood and distinctive drop-shaped glass headlights. Technically Bremach Brick and Extreme (4x4) are not much different from the previous series of GR. The main difference between highway "hard workers" from their counterparts is the possibility of a complete air suspension and 146-horsepower turbo-diesel allowing a fully loaded vehicle to reach speeds up to 125 kmh.

Since 2008, a new Bremach T-REX was introduced to replace the old lineup. Its transmission consists of a base mechanical six-speed ZF transmission with a two-stage transfer case, providing up to 24 forward gears and four back. The suspension consists of a beam axle on the springs. The new cab on T-REX is completely new design, with improved visibility and heavy-duty space frame, which had previously only been used in aircraft and race cars of Formula 1.

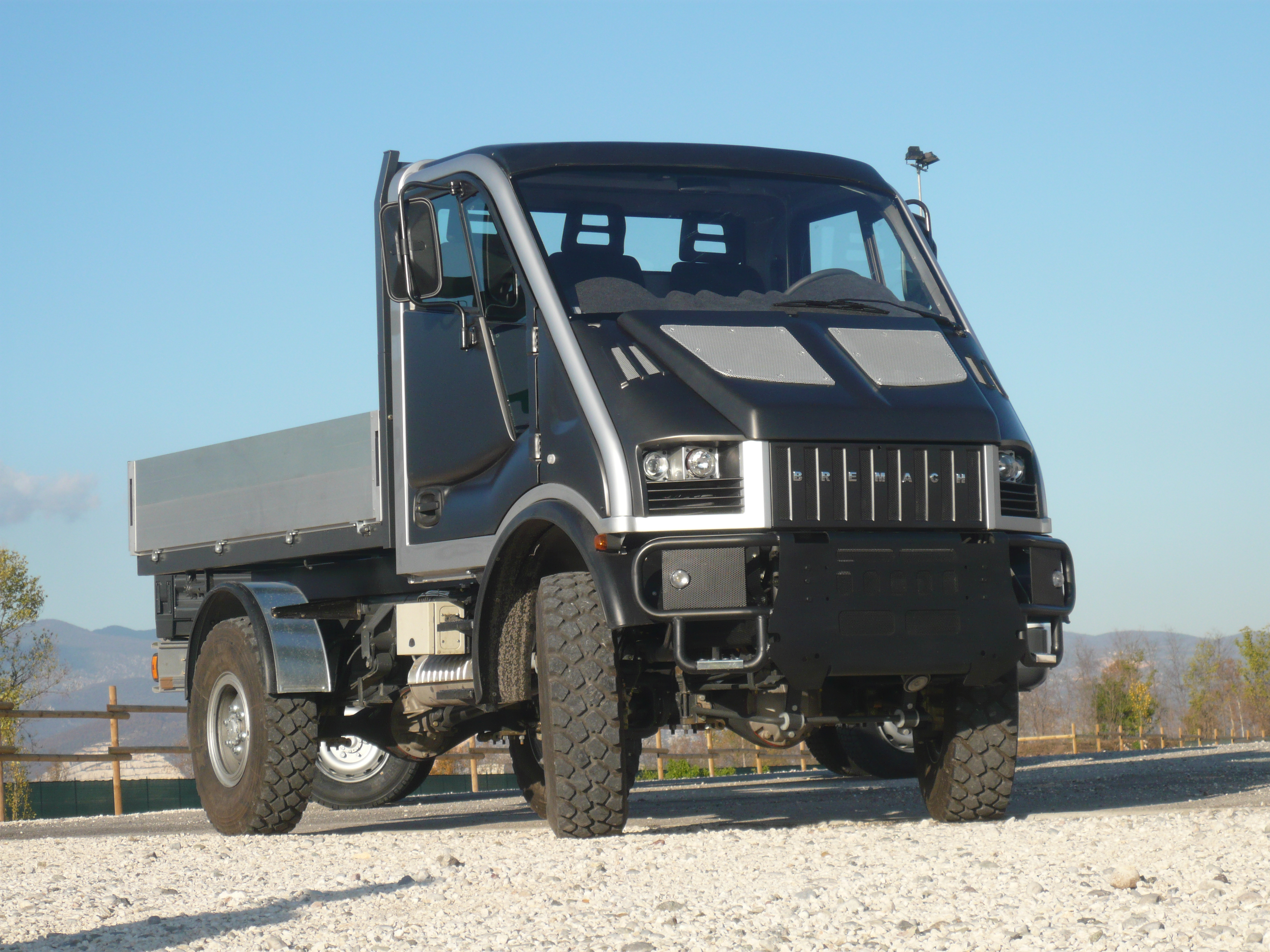
Bremach T Rex

In 2009, Bremach Industry, in conjunction with the Ulyanovsk Automobile Plant (UAZ), started development of a new special truck chassis-based Bremach-UAZ T-REX. It was assumed that with the UAZ T-REX's terrain capacity of up to 3.5 tonnes, orders would be placed to meet needs of the road construction sector, government agencies, as well as special vehicles for the emergency operation at processing facilities in remote regions. As far as is known from reliable sources, this project has not received further development.

In 2011, Bremach released the Demokar Electric Bremach T-REX EV. It has a frame cabin, an "adaptive spatial framework", which is strengthened with high-strength steel, capable of withstanding a load of 5+1 G. The heart of the T-REX is the roll bar which avoids any cracks and deformations, even in the case of very heavy loads. In Germany, the cars were subject to heavy military tests (virtual and real), and they were assigned the necessary certificates for art through KMW. The small size and high load capacity electric Bremach T-REX revolutionized the field of special transport at the international level. Specially made for this project, Bremach is used today in the areas of aerospace and aviation.

In 2015, the production rights of the T-Rex was sold to Tekne as Bremach s.r.l. filed for bankruptcy. The naming rights remain with Bremach s.r.l. In March 2018 bankruptcy was declared complete.

=== Bremach USA ===
The American division (Bremach Inc.) survived the company's bankruptcy and started collaborating with UAZ to develop a new SUV 4x4 for sale in the United States. Sollers, with a controlling share in UAZ, was at the time also in manufacturing agreements with Ford, Toyota, and other OEMs. In December 2020, it was announced that the UAZ Patriot 4×4 and pickup was to be imported into the United States as the Bremach 4x4 Taos SUV and Bremach 4x4 Brio pickup in 2021 (planned for sale as a 2022 model range) with the range supposed to start at $26,405 for the SUV and $27,882 for the pickup. Bremach debuted the Special Edition 2022 4x4 SUVs, co-developed with UAZ, at the 2021 LA Auto Show. However, the company suspended operations due to the 2022 Russian invasion of Ukraine.

== Production models ==
- 1956: merger of Aeronautica Macchi products
- 1960: Bremach GR
- 1970: Bremach NGR
- 1980: Bremach Brio
- 1990: Bremach Job X4
- 2000: Bremach Job X2
- 2005: Bremach Job

== Bremach T-Rex ==
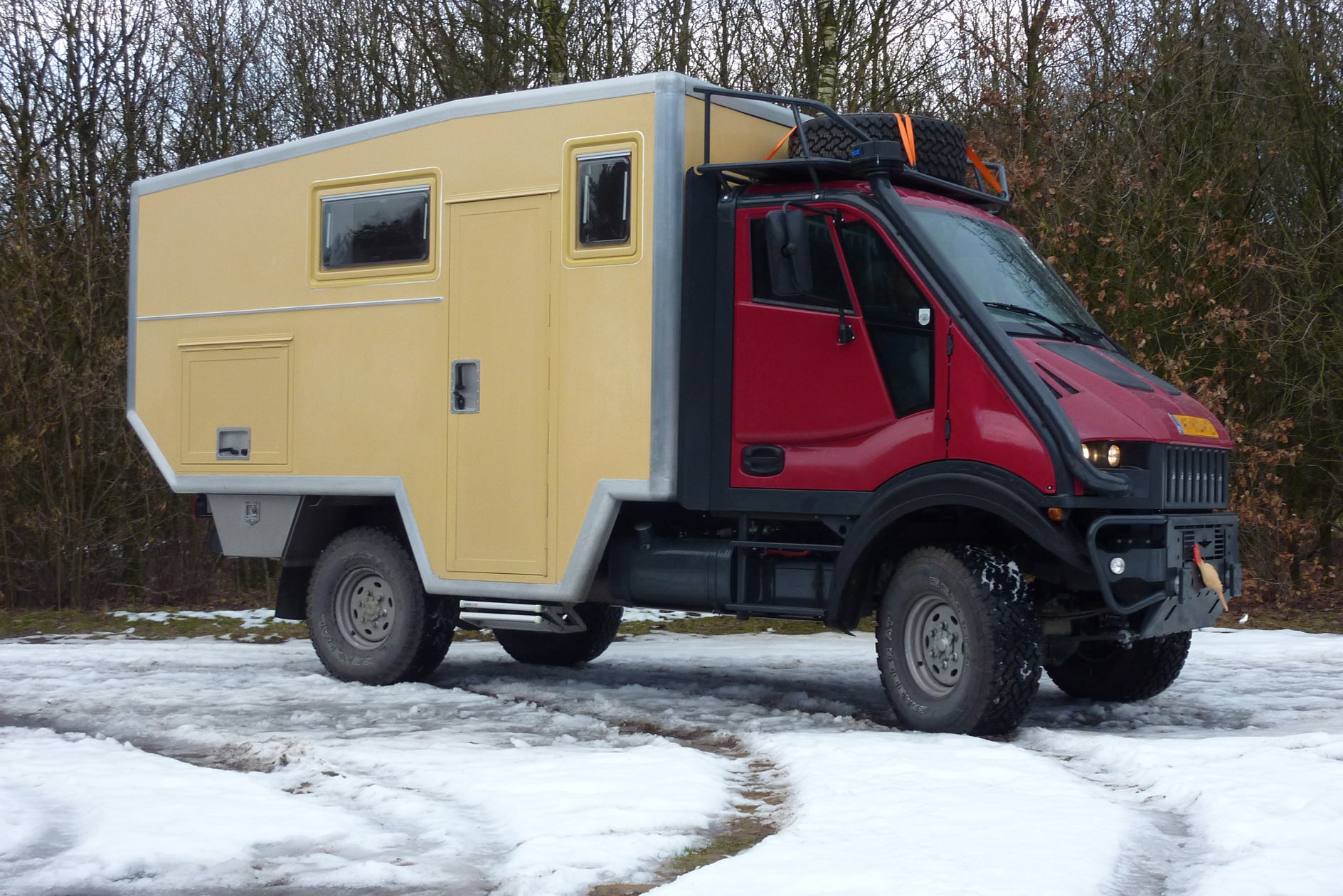
Bremach-Motorhome

Cab:

- Open (Spider) for 2 seats.
- Single (Singola) - 2-3 single place.
- Double (Doppia) - double for 5-6 places.

Engine:

- Iveco F1A 2.3 liter. - 116 HP
- Iveco F1C 3.0 liters. - 170 HP

Wheelbase: 2600/3100/3450/3700 mm depending on version

Transmission:

- Manual - ZF S4000 (6+1)
- Automatic - Allison 1000Sp (5+1)
- Transfer Case - Bremach

Other:

- Permanent four-wheel drive
- Gross vehicle weight of 3500 to 6500 kg
