= Macchi =

Macchi is an Italian surname, the patronymic or plural form of the old personal name Macco from the Latin Maccus. It is possibly a variant of macchia. Notable people with the surname include:

- Aurelio Macchi (1916–2010), Argentine sculptor
- Carlos Macchi (born 1974), Uruguayan footballer
- Fabrizio Macchi (born 1970), Italian cyclist
- Filippo Macchi (born 2001), Italian foil fencer
- Françoise Macchi (born 1951), French alpine skier
- Gabriel Macchi (born 1975), Portuguese track and field athlete
- Giulio Macchi (1866–1935), Italian aeronautical engineer and founder of the Aermacchi aircraft manufacturer
- Hiralal Macchi, Indian cricketer
- Laura Macchi (born 1979), Italian basketball player
- Luigi Macchi (1832–1907), Italian Catholic nobleman and Cardinal
- Luis González Macchi (born 1947), Paraguayan politician and former president
- Odile Macchi (born 1943), French physicist and mathematician
- Pasquale Macchi (1923–1906), Italian archbishop
- Piera Macchi (born 1959), Italian alpine skier
- Pruthvikumar Macchi (born 1995), Omani cricketer
- Valentino Macchi (1937–2013), Italian actor

== See also ==
- Macchi (disambiguation)
