= Macchi M.24 =

M.24
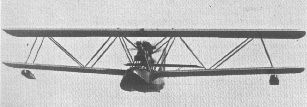

General information
- Type: Flying boat bomber
- National origin: Italy
- Manufacturer: Macchi
- Designer: Alessandro Tonini

History
- First flight: 1924

The Macchi M.24 was a flying boat designed by Alessandro Tonini and produced by Macchi in Italy during the 1920s. Originally intended as a bomber, it was eventually produced for civilian use as well.

== Design and development ==
The M.24 resembled a scaled-up version of earlier Macchi flying boat bombers such as the M.9 and M.18, sharing their biplane configuration and Warren truss-style interplane struts. However, while these earlier aircraft were single-engine types, the M.24 had twin engines mounted in a tractor-pusher pair on struts in the interplane gap. Also like the M.18, it featured an open position in the bow for a gunner, but added a second such position amidships as well.

Two M.24s made a demonstration flight in 1925 from Macchi's home on Lake Varese, crossing the Alps to Amsterdam, Copenhagen, Stockholm, Leningrad and home again. This feat was followed by torpedo-launching experiments. The M.24 saw extensive use with the Italian Navy, and several were purchased by the Spanish Navy, which made an extensive use of them during the Rif War, particularly in the Alhucemas landing.

A civil version with equal-span wings was developed in 1927 as the M.24bis. This featured an enclosed cabin within the forward hull that could seat eight passengers. Aero Espresso Italiana flew these on its Brindisi-Athens-Constantinople route, and SITAR operated them on routes in the Mediterranean as well.

== Operators ==
Kingdom of Italy

- Regia Marina

== Variants ==
- M.24 - initial production version - biplane with Fiat A.12 engines and shorter lower wings
- M.24bis - equal-span version with Lorraine-Dietrich or Isotta-Fraschini Asso engines, produced in both military and civil subtypes
- M.24ter - military version with Isotta-Fraschini Asso engines

== Specifications (M.24ter) ==
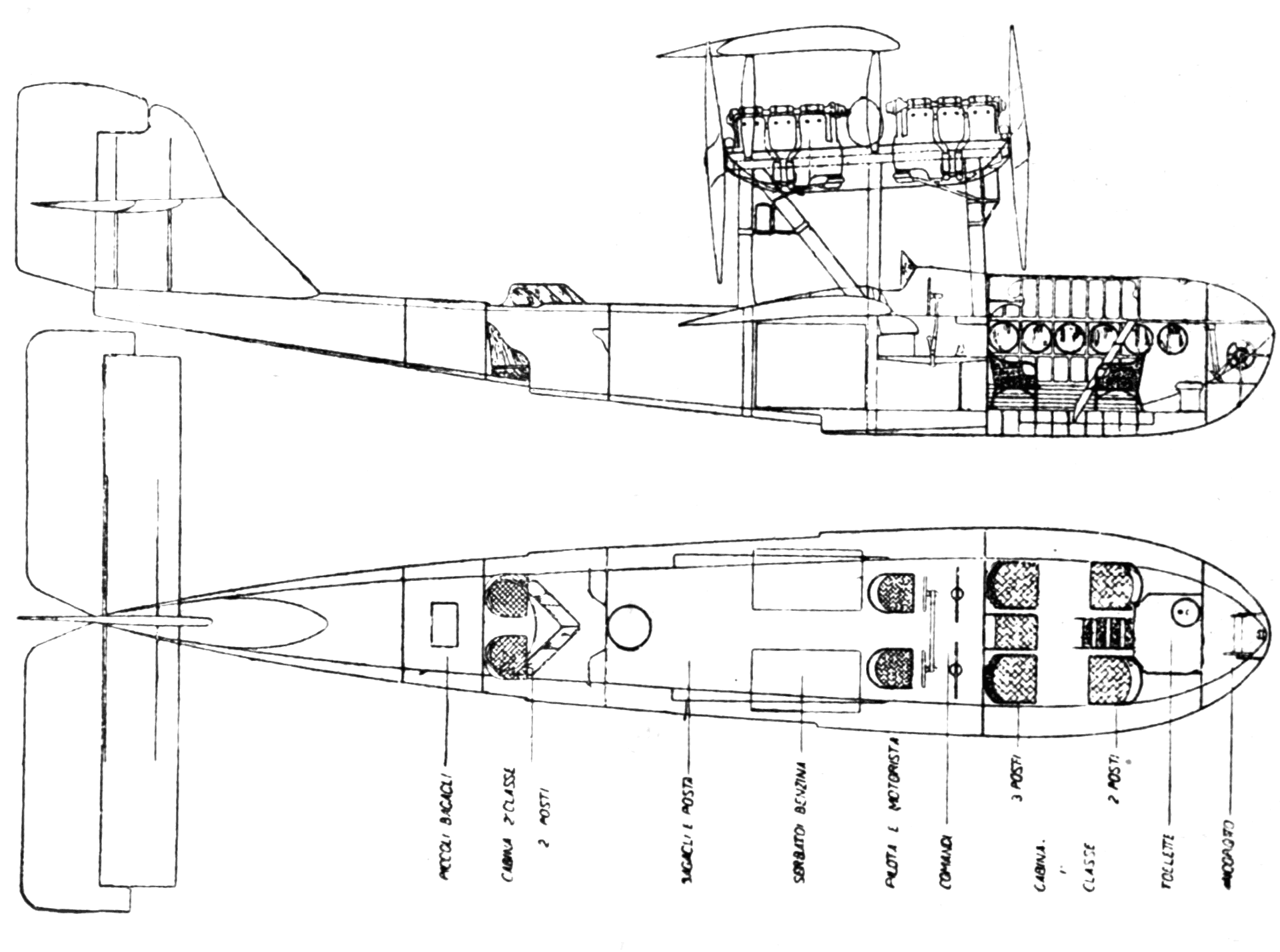
Macchi M.24 fuselage drawing from L'Air June 15,1927

Data from World Aircraft Information Files File 901 Sheet 02

General characteristics

- Crew: 3
- Length: 14.63 m (48 ft 0 in)
- Wingspan: 22.00 m (72 ft 2 in)
- Height: 4.65 m (15 ft 3 in)
- Empty weight: 3,730 kg (8,223 lb)
- Gross weight: 5,500 kg (12,125 lb)
- Powerplant: 2 × Isotta Fraschini Asso 500 , 380 kW (510 hp) each

Performance

- Maximum speed: 185 km/h (115 mph, 100 kn)
- Range: 700 km (435 mi, 378 nmi)
- Service ceiling: 4,000 m (13,000 ft)

Armament

- 1 × 7.7 mm (.303 in) Vickers machine gun in open position in bow
- 1 × 7.7 mm (.303 in) Vickers machine gun in open position amidships
- 800 kg (1,874 lb) of bombs

== See also ==
Related lists

- List of Interwar military aircraft
- List of seaplanes and flying boats
