= Macchi M.8 =

Type of aircraft

General information
- Type: Reconnaissance/bomber flying boat
- National origin: Italy
- Manufacturer: Macchi
- Designer: Alessandro Tonini
- Primary user: Italian Navy Aviation
- Number built: 57

History
- First flight: 1917

The Macchi M.8 was an Italian reconnaissance/bomber flying boat designed by Alessandro Tonini and built by Macchi. It was used by the Italian Naval Aviation and was later flown by crews from the United States Navy.

== Design and development ==
The M.8 was similar to earlier flying boat designs from the company but introduced new rigid wing bracing (or interplane struts). The hull was improved from earlier designs and the tail unit was similar to that developed for the M.7. It was a biplane flying boat with the pilot and co-pilot in a side-by-side open cockpit with a further open cockpit forward of them for an observer. The third cockpit was fitted with a machine gun ring and there was access inside the hull between the cockpits. The M.8 was powered by a single Isotta-Fraschini V.4B pusher engine mounted below the upper wing.

A total of 57 aircraft were built between 1917 and 1918 and were used for coastal reconnaissance and to attack enemy submarines. After World War I, a number of surviving aircraft were used at seaplane flying schools for instruction.

== Operators ==
Kingdom of Italy

- Corpo Aeronautico Militare

Sweden

- Swedish Navy

United States

- United States Navy

== Specifications (Macchi M.8) ==
Data from

General characteristics

- Crew: three (pilot, co-pilot and observer/gunner)
- Wingspan: 16.00 m (52 ft 6 in)
- Gross weight: 1,430 kg (3,153 lb)
- Powerplant: 1 × Isotta Fraschini V.4B piston engine , 127 kW (170 hp)

Performance

- Maximum speed: 167 km/h (104 mph, 90 kn)
- Endurance: 3 hours 0 minutes

Armament

- 1 × 7.7 mm (0.303 in) Vickers machine-gun or similar, ring mounted in forward cockpit
- 4 × 50 kg (110 lb) bombs

== See also ==
Related lists

- List of seaplanes and flying boats
