= Macchi MB1 =

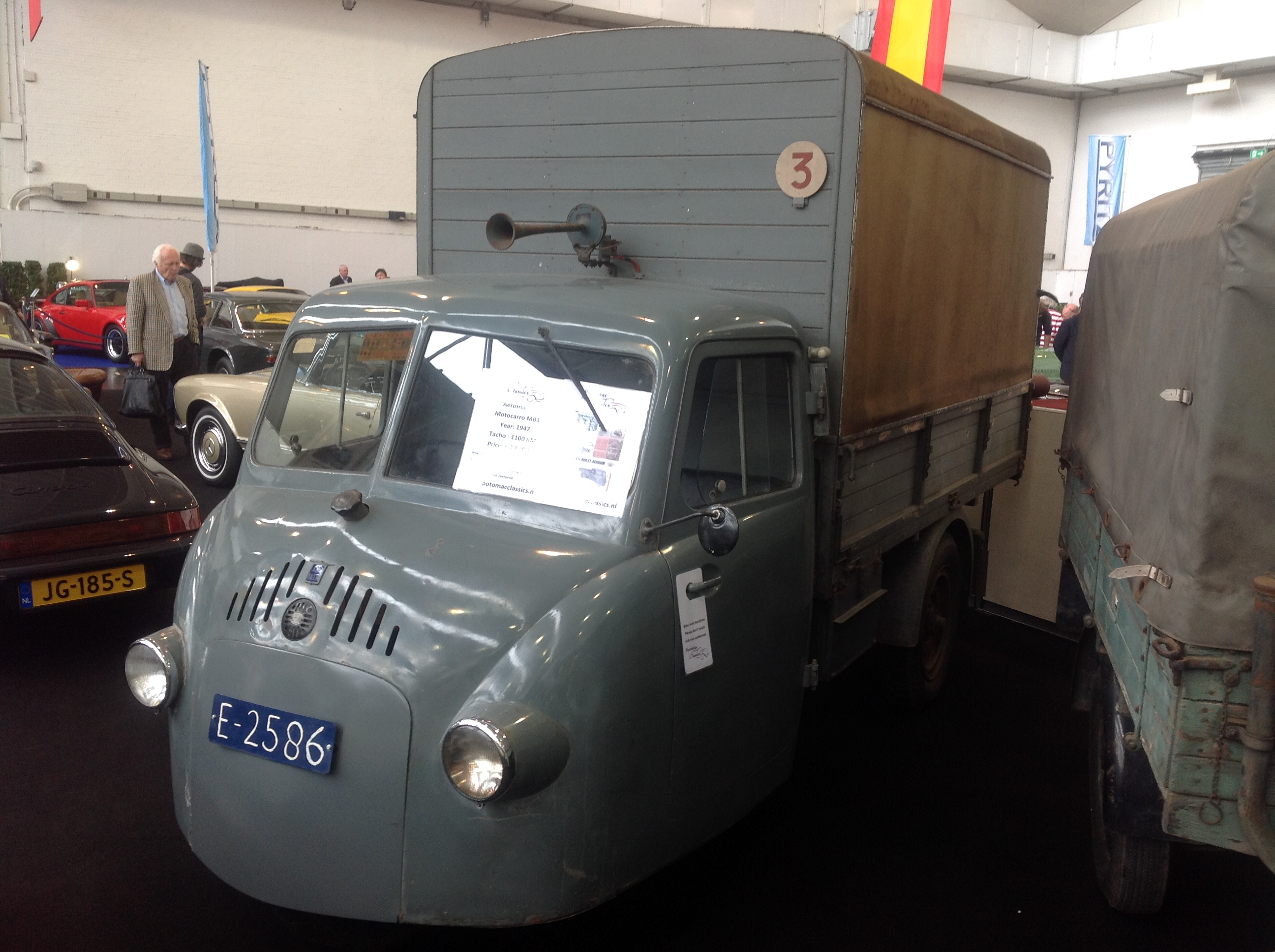

Overview
- Manufacturer: Aermacchi
- Production: 1945–1990s

Body and chassis
- Class: Motorized tricycle
- Body style: Flatbed truck

The Macchi MB1, also called Macchitre (due to its three wheels), is a three-wheeled truck, designed by Ermanno Bazzocchi and produced starting from 1945 by the Italian company Aermacchi for the sector road transport. The vehicle is also known under the Bremach brand: a Bremach motorcycle after the Varese-based company, which then moved to the province of Brescia, acquired the production rights towards the end of the sixties.
