= Macchi M.14 =

Italian fighter aircraft

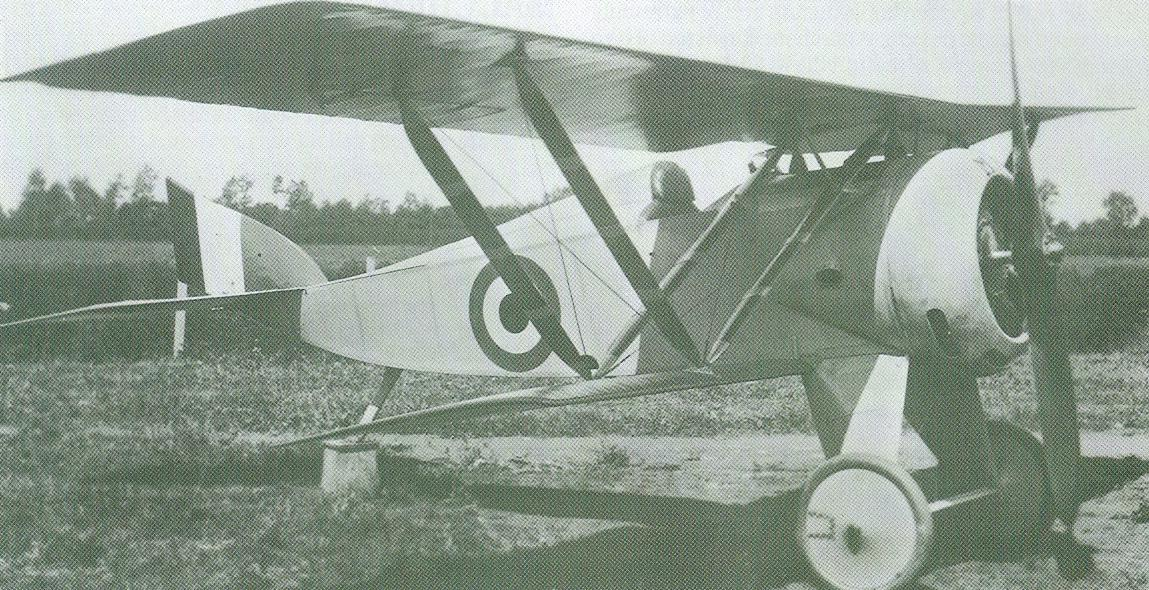

General information
- Type: Fighter
- National origin: Italy
- Manufacturer: Macchi
- Designer: Alessandro Tonini
- Primary user: Italy
- Number built: 11

History
- Introduction date: 1919
- First flight: 1918

The Macchi M.14 was an Italian fighter of 1918 designed and manufactured by Macchi. The M.14 was the first non-seaplane fighter Macchi produced, its previous fighter production having focused on flying boat fighters.

== Design and development ==
Alessandro Tonini designed the M.14, which was a single-seat wooden sesquiplane with Warren truss interplane bracing and armed with two fixed, forward-firing 7.7-millimeter (0.303-inch) Vickers machine guns synchronized to fire through the propeller. It had fixed, tailskid landing gear, and its 82-kilowatt (110-horsepower) Le Rhône 9J nine-cylinder rotary engine drove a two-bladed tractor propeller.

== Operational history ==
Company testing of the M.14 prototype began in the spring of 1918. It was destroyed in June 1918, but Macchi then constructed 10 production aircraft, which underwent official evaluation at Guidonia Montecelio in 1919. Although no additional M.14s were ordered, the 10 aircraft saw service as advanced trainers. At least one of them is known to have become a civilian aircraft with the civil registration I-BADG.

== Operators ==
Kingdom of Italy

- Corpo Aeronautico Militare

== Specifications ==
Data from

General characteristics

- Crew: 1
- Length: 5.65 m (18 ft 6 in)
- Wingspan: 8.2 m (26 ft 11 in)
- Height: 2.62 m (8 ft 7 in)
- Wing area: 16.6 m^{2} (179 sq ft)
- Empty weight: 440 kg (970 lb)
- Gross weight: 640 kg (1,411 lb)
- Powerplant: 1 × Le Rhône 9J 9-cylinder air-cooled rotary piston engine, 82 kW (110 hp)

Performance

- Maximum speed: 182 km/h (113 mph, 98 kn) at sea level
- Endurance: 2 hours
- Time to altitude: 1,000 m (3,300 ft) in 3 minutes 30 seconds

Armament

- Guns: 2 × fixed forward-firing synchronized 7.7 mm (0.303 in) machine guns

== See also ==
- Alenia Aermacchi

Related lists

- List of Interwar military aircraft
