= Macchi M.70 =

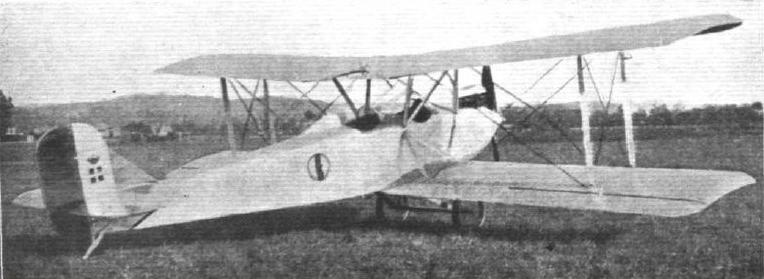

General information
- Type: Light biplane
- National origin: Italy
- Manufacturer: Macchi

History
- First flight: Late 1920s

The Macchi M.70, was an Italian light biplane of the late 1920s built by Macchi.

== Design and development ==
Line drawings from Flight magazine, 21 February 1929

The M.70 was a two-seat, single-bay biplane with tandem cockpits. The pilot generally sat in the rear cockpit, but both cockpits had flight controls. The fuselage was of wooden construction with plywood skin and was of rectangular section. The wings were of equal span, fairly thick section, and wooden construction; they had fabric covering, and only the lower wing had ailerons. The interplane struts were steel tubes braced with piano wire. The tail surfaces were constructed of steel frames covered by fabric. The rudder was balanced, while the ailerons and elevators were unbalanced.

The aircraft was powered by the Blackburn Cirrus II engine or similar engines in the 56 to 60 kilowatt (75 to 80 horsepower) range, driving a two-bladed tractor propeller. Its wings were hinged and could be folded back along the fuselage, and the aircraft could be converted from landplane to floatplane configuration by removal of its fixed, V-type, straight-axle wheeled landing gear and installation of twin, single-step floats mounted on four struts.

== Operational history ==
An M.70 flown by an Italian pilot named Agello was among 53 aircraft entered in the 1930 Giro Aereo d'Italia ("Circuit of Italy") race, which more or less circled the Italian "boot" and was held in four stages flown on 25, 27, 29, and 31 August 1930. Rather than be held as a straightforward timed race, the Giro Aereo d'Italia used a handicapping system to determine a staggered start at the beginning of each of the four stages of the race; the system was biased against aircraft with better pure racing capabilities, adjusting start times to favor planes with other characteristics the race organizers deemed useful in general aviation. During preliminary tests held before the race, an aircraft received a higher number of points if it demonstrated a higher rate of climb, shorter takeoff run, and shorter landing distance, and if it had better "touring qualities"—folding wings, comfort, ease of control in flight, and an ability to accommodate safety features such as the wearing of parachutes, among other things; it was penalized for greater weight and higher engine power. The aircraft with the highest point total was allowed to start first in each stage, those with fewer points starting later at a rate of one minute of delay per point behind.

Agello's M.70, powered by a 60 kW (80 hp) Colombo S.53 engine, had among the three shortest takeoff runs and demonstrated the shortest landing distance of any of the 53 entrants, stopping in only 50 meters (164 feet). Overall, the point system placed the M.70 in the ninth starting position, allowing Agello to start with an 11-minute handicap.

== Operators ==
Kingdom of Italy

- Regia Marina
- Regia Aeronautica

== Specifications ==
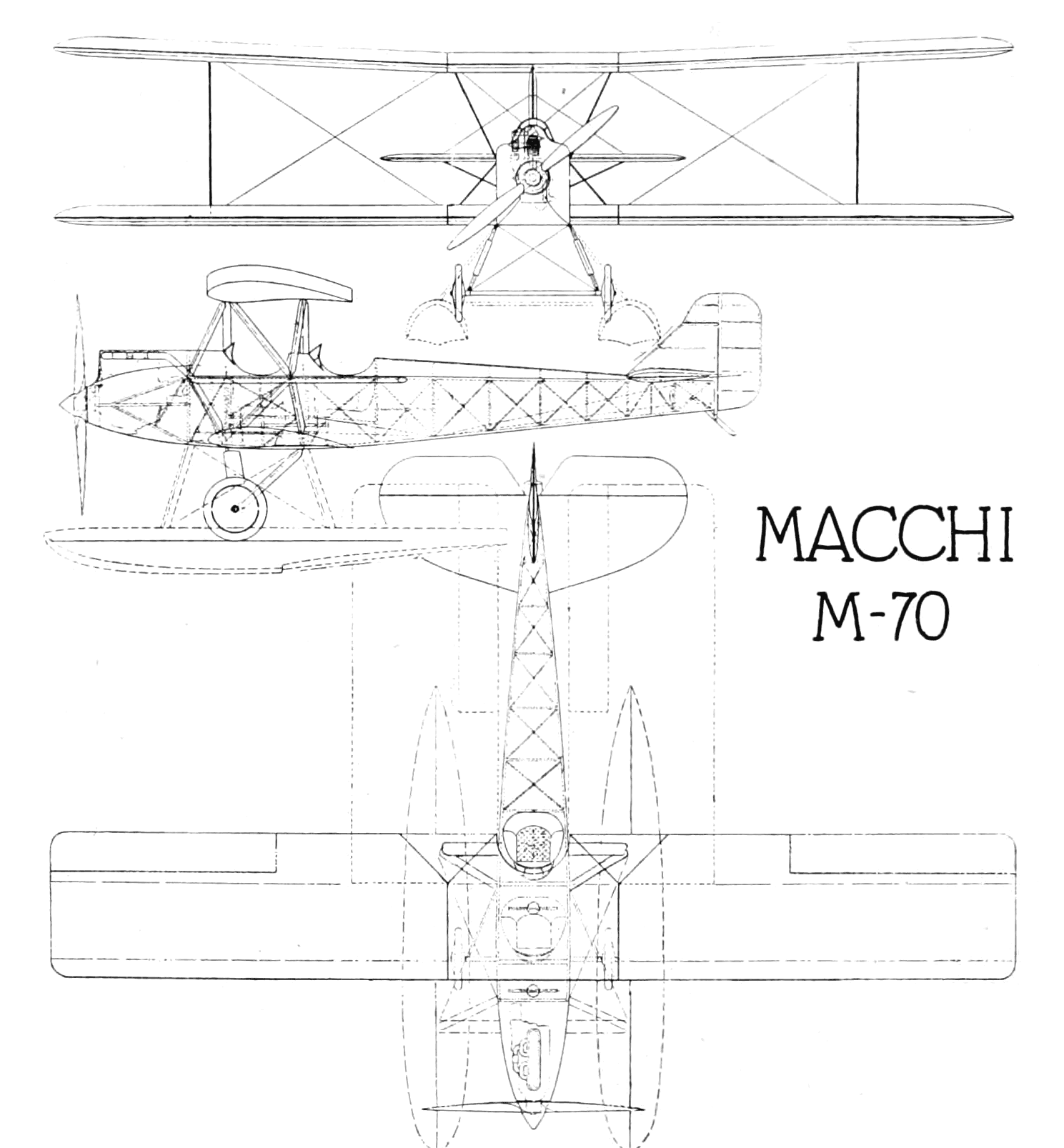
Macchi M.70 3-view drawing from Aero Digest June,1930

Data from

General characteristics

- Crew: two
- Length: 7.06 m (23 ft 2 in)
- Wingspan: 9.95 m (32 ft 8 in)
- Height: 2.95 m (9 ft 8 in)
- Wing area: 28.4 m^{2} (306 sq ft)
- Empty weight: 460 kg (1,014 lb)
- Gross weight: 740 kg (1,631 lb)
- Powerplant: 1 × Blackburn Cirrus II 4-cyl air-cooled in-line piston engine, 60 kW (80 hp) (or similar)

Performance

- Maximum speed: 155 km/h (96 mph, 84 kn)
- Stall speed: 55 km/h (34 mph, 30 kn)
- Service ceiling: 4,600 m (15,100 ft)
- Time to altitude:
- 7 mins to 1,000 m (3,281 ft)
- 53 mins to 4,000 m (13,123 ft)
- Wing loading: 26 kg/m^{2} (5.3 lb/sq ft)
- Power/mass: 0.0764 kg/kw (0.0476 lbs/hp)

== See also ==
- Alenia Aermacchi

Related lists

- List of seaplanes and flying boats
