= Giulio Macchi =

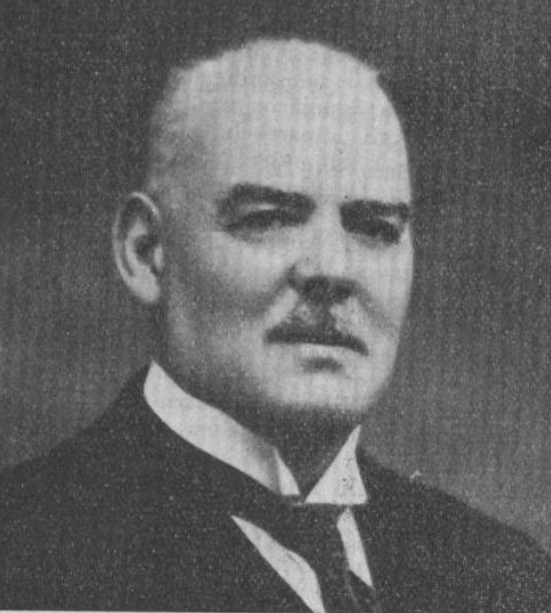
- Macchi in Grande enciclopedia aeronautica, 1936
- Born: 1866
- Died: 1935 (aged 68–69)
- Occupations: Aeronautical engineer, entrepreneur

Giulio Macchi (Italian pronunciation: [ˈdʒuːljo ˈmakki]; 1866–1935) was an Italian aeronautical engineer, the founder of Società Anonima Nieuport-Macchi (now Alenia Aermacchi).

Macchi ran a small coachbuilder's works, Carrozzeria Fratelli Macchi (Macchi Brothers Coachworks), together with his brothers, before founding Società Anonima Nieuport-Macchi in Varese on May 1, 1913. The company started building Nieuport aircraft under license but soon (from 1916) began producing its own designs, including the successful Macchi M.5 flying boat fighter. In the 1920s the company became fully autonomous and in 1924 it was renamed Aeronautica Macchi; Macchi began collaborating with designer Mario Castoldi and together they built the famous family of Italian race seaplanes composed by the M.39, the M.52, the M.67 and the record-breaking M.C.72; the latter last flew in 1934, the year before Macchi's death.

== Bibliography ==
- Giorgio Apostolo (1991). Aermacchi: From Nieuports to AMX. Milan, Italy: GAE.
