= Macchi M.18 =

M.18

General information
- Type: Flying boat bomber
- National origin: Italy
- Manufacturer: Macchi
- Designer: Alessandro Tonini

History
- First flight: 1920

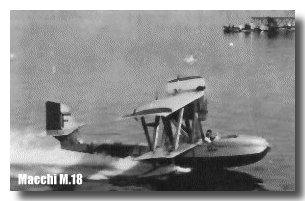

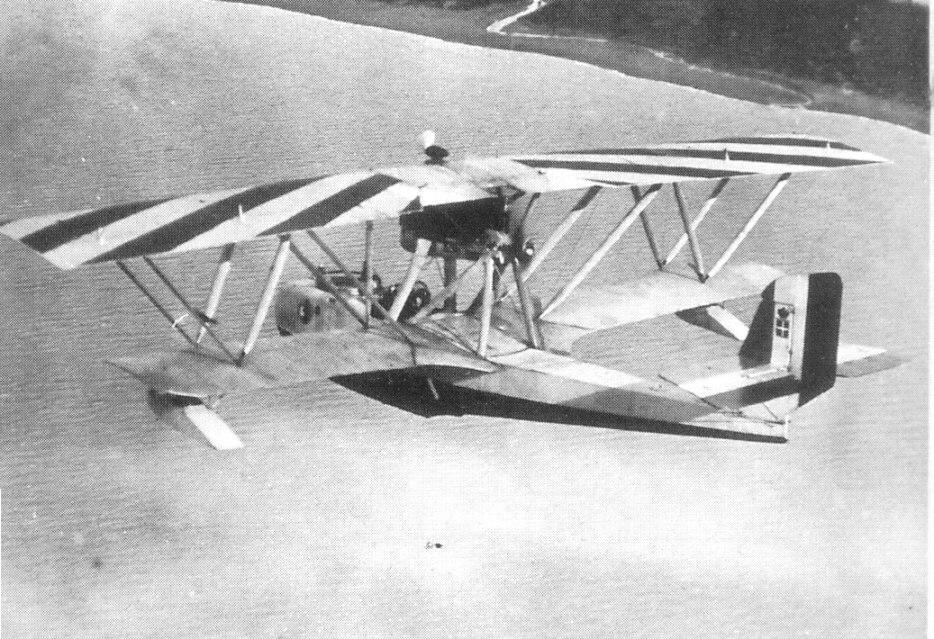

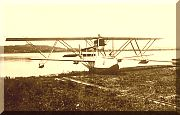

The Macchi M.18 was a flying boat designed by Alessandro Tonini and produced by Macchi in Italy in the early 1920s. Originally planned as a passenger aircraft, it entered production as a bomber before eventually being offered on the civil market that it was originally intended for.

== Design and development ==
A conventional design for World War I, the M.18 was a biplane flying boat with unstaggered wings of unequal span braced by Warren truss-style struts. The engine was mounted pusher-fashion in the interplane gap, and the pilot and observer sat in side-by-side open cockpits. An open position was provided in the bow for a gunner.

In addition to the standard military version, a version with folding wings was produced for shipboard use as the M.18AR. This equipped the Italian Navy's seaplane tender Giuseppe Miraglia and the Spanish Navy's Dédalo. The latter service used the type in action against Moroccan rebels. Six of the 20 machines purchased by Spain remained in service at the outbreak of the Spanish Civil War and were used to attack Nationalist forces on Mallorca as well as flying reconnaissance patrols. Portugal also operated the type, buying eight examples in 1928.

The Paraguayan government bought two Macchi M.18AR in late 1932 for the naval aviation wing. They received the serials R.3 and R.5 and were intensively used in the Chaco War (1932–1935). Both fulfilled many reconnaissance and bombing missions in the North Front during the war. The first aerial night bombing was done by R.5 on December 22, 1934. R.3 was destroyed in an accident at the end of the war and R.5 was in service until the mid-1940s.

Three civil versions were eventually produced. The first of these, the M.18 Economico ("Commercial"), was generally similar to the military version, but was followed by the M.18 Lusso ("Luxury") which featured an enclosed cabin. The M.18 Estivo ("Summertime") again reverted to open cockpits. Some 70 civil examples were produced in all, some being purchased by joyriding firms such as Ad Astra Aero in Switzerland and some others being used by SISA for training flying boat pilots for airline service in the Adriatic.

== Variants ==
M.18
Standard bomber version.
M.18AR
With folding wings for shipboard use.
M.18 Economico
(Commercial) Civil version generally similar to the Military bomber.
M.18 Lusso
(Luxury) Enclosed cabin VIP transport.
M.18 Estivo
(Summertime) Open cockpit for joyriding.

== Operators ==
Ecuador

- Ecuadorian Air Force

Kingdom of Italy

- Regia Marina

Paraguay

- Paraguayan Navy

Portugal

- Portuguese Navy

Spain

- Spanish Republican Air Force
- Spanish Republican Navy

Spain

- Spanish Air Force
- Spanish Navy

== Specifications (M.18 AR) ==
Data from World Aircraft Information Files File 901 Sheet 02

General characteristics

- Crew: three - pilot, observer, and gunner
- Length: 9.75 m (32 ft 0 in)
- Wingspan: 15.80 m (51 ft 10 in)
- Height: 3.25 m (10 ft 8 in)
- Wing area: 45.0 m^{2} (484 sq ft)
- Empty weight: 1,275 kg (2,811 lb)
- Gross weight: 1,785 kg (3,935 lb)
- Powerplant: 1 × Isotta Fraschini Asso 250 , 186 kW (250 hp)

Performance

- Maximum speed: 187 km/h (116 mph, 101 kn)
- Range: 1,000 km (621 mi, 540 nmi)
- Service ceiling: 5,500 m (18,000 ft)

Armament

- 1 × 7.7 mm (.303 in) Vickers machine gun on ring mount in bow
- 4 × light bombs on underwing racks

== See also ==
Related lists

- List of Interwar military aircraft
- List of seaplanes and flying boats
- List of aircraft of the Spanish Republican Air Force
