= Macchi M.17 =

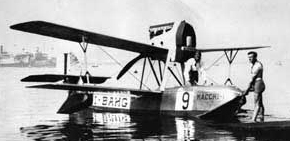
- The M.17 (I-BAHG) that took third place in the 1922 Schneider Trophy race.

General information
- Type: Racing flying boat
- National origin: Italy
- Manufacturer: Macchi
- Designer: Alessandro Tonini
- Primary user: Italy
- Number built: 2

History
- First flight: 1922

The Macchi M.17 was an Italian racing flying boat built by Macchi for the 1922 Schneider Trophy race.

== Design and development ==
The M.17 was the first purpose-built racing seaplane that Macchi company designer Alessandro Tonini designed. It was a single-seat flying boat powered by a 186-kilowatt (250-horsepower) Isotta Fraschini V.6 engine mounted on the upper wing on N struts and driving a two-bladed propeller in a pusher configuration.

== Operational history ==
Macchi built two M.17 aircraft, one of which (I-BAHG) took third place in the 1922 Schneider Trophy race with Arturo Zanetti at the controls. It posted an average speed of 225 kilometers per hour (140 miles per hour). The other M.17, I-BAFV flown by Piero Corgnolino, placed fourth.

== Operators ==
Kingdom of Italy

- Regia Marina

== Specifications ==
Data from

General characteristics

- Crew: 1
- Wingspan: 8.8 m (28 ft 10 in)
- Gross weight: 950 kg (2,094 lb)
- Powerplant: 1 × Isotta Fraschini V.6 6-cylinder water-cooled in-line piston engine, 186 kW (249 hp)

Performance

- Maximum speed: 225 km/h (140 mph, 121 kn)
- Cruise speed: 187 km/h (116 mph, 101 kn)

== See also ==
- Schneider Trophy

Related lists

- List of seaplanes and flying boats
