= Macchi M.16 =

M.16
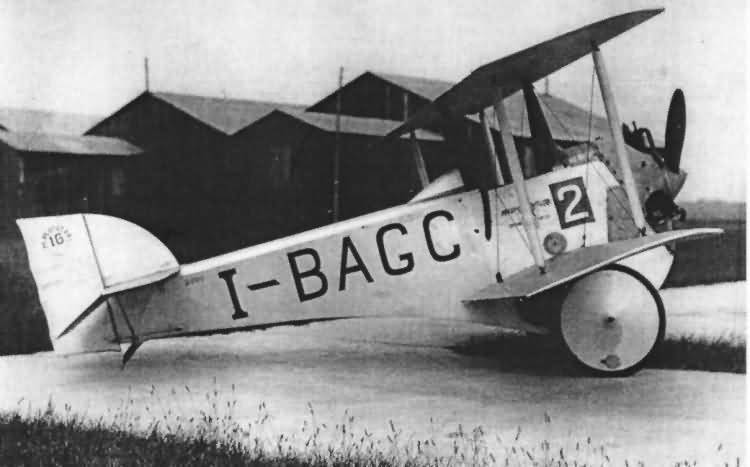

General information
- Type: Sport aircraft
- National origin: Italy
- Manufacturer: Macchi
- Designer: Alessandro Tonini

History
- First flight: 1919

The Macchi M.16 was a light, single-seat aircraft designed by Alessandro Tonini and produced by Macchi in Italy in 1919.

== Design and development ==
The M.16 was a single-bay biplane with unstaggered wings and a largely conventional design except for an unusually deep fuselage that extended in a bulge below the lower wing. The M.16 was developed in parallel with the Macchi M.20, a two-seat civil trainer aircraft which it resembled and with which it shared many common features.

The M.16 proved a successful sporting type, setting an altitude record of 3,770 m (12,370 ft) in 1920 while competing for the Coppa Mappelli ("Mapelli Cup"), and winning first prize in the competition in 1921.

The United States Navy purchased three float-equipped examples for evaluation as communication floatplanes.

== Operators ==
Kingdom of Italy

- Private users

United States

- United States Navy

German Empire

- -

== Specifications ==
General characteristics

- Crew: 1, pilot
- Length: 4.43 m (14 ft 6 in)
- Wingspan: 6.00 m (19 ft 8 in)
- Height: 2.12 m (7 ft 0 in)
- Wing area: 11.3 m^{2} (122 sq ft)
- Empty weight: 160 kg (350 lb)
- Gross weight: 260 kg (570 lb)
- Powerplant: 1 × Anzani air-cooled radial , 22 kW (30 hp)

Performance

- Maximum speed: 165 km/h (103 mph, 90 kn)
- Range: 420 km (260 mi, 230 nmi)

== See also ==
Related development

- Macchi M.20

Related lists

- List of flying boats and floatplanes
