= Macchi M.33 =

Italian racing flying boat

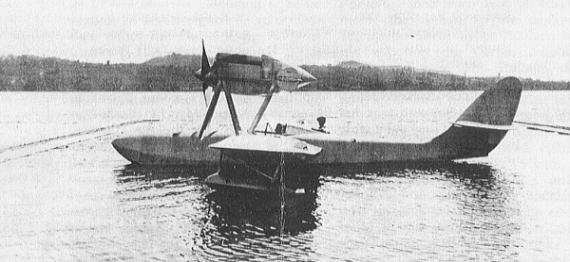

General information
- Type: Racing flying boat
- Manufacturer: Aeronautica Macchi
- Primary user: Italy
- Number built: 2

History
- First flight: 1925

The Macchi M.33 was an Italian racing flying boat which competed in the 1925 Schneider Trophy race.

== Design and development ==
The Macchi M.33 was a single-seat, wooden, shoulder-wing monoplane flying boat of very clean aerodynamic design for its time. Its cantilever wing was fairly thick and carried stabilizing floats on each side. Italy lacked competitive racing engines in 1925, so the M.33 was powered with a used 1923 Curtiss D-12 engine rated at 378 kilowatts (507 horsepower) in a streamlined nacelle mounted on struts above the fuselage and driving a two-bladed tractor propeller. The M.33 had a flat-plate radiator, a type that was obsolescent by 1925, rather than modern surface radiators.

The D-12 engines powering M.33s were worn-out and unreliable and lacked the power of newer foreign engines, and pilots reported that the aircraft suffered from wing flutter.

== Operational history ==
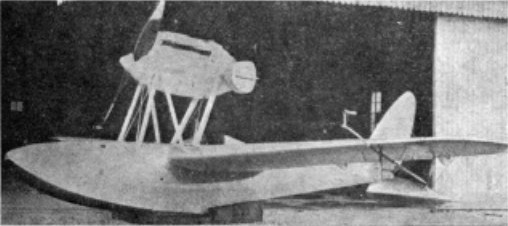
M.33 on ground

Despite the M.33's shortcomings, Italy entered two of them in the 1925 Schneider Trophy race hosted by the United States at Baltimore, Maryland. The one piloted by Riccardo Morselli was scratched from the race because of engine ignition problems. Giovanni de Briganti piloted the other M.33; during the race he did not use full throttle out of fear for his aircraft's engine and wing problems, and was further delayed by a navigational error he made during the second lap of the seven-lap race. He came in third with an average speed of 271 kilometers per hour (168 miles per hour); this was well behind the second-place finisher, a British Gloster IIIA piloted by Hubert Broad which finished with an average speed of 321 kilometers per hour (199 miles per hour), and also behind the winner, an American Curtiss R3C-2 piloted by Jimmy Doolittle (1896–1993), which finished with an average speed of 374 kilometers per hour (233 miles per hour).

De Briganti's M.33 was the last flying boat to compete in the Schneider Trophy races.

== Specifications ==
Data from Vitesse à l'italienne: Le Macchi M.33

General characteristics

- Crew: 1
- Length: 8.55 m (28 ft 1 in)
- Wingspan: 9.74 m (31 ft 11 in)
- Height: 2.68 m (8 ft 10 in)
- Wing area: 15 m^{2} (160 sq ft)
- Empty weight: 975 kg (2,150 lb)
- Gross weight: 1,255 kg (2,767 lb)
- Powerplant: 1 × Curtiss D-12 V-12 water-cooled piston engine, 340 kW (450 hp)

Performance

- Maximum speed: 350 km/h (220 mph, 190 kn)
- Stall speed: 110 km/h (68 mph, 59 kn)

== See also ==
- Porco Rosso - The design of Porco's fictional Savoia S.21 racer similar to that of the M.33, however there are many major detail differences.

Related lists

- List of flying boats and floatplanes

== Bibliography ==
- Lefèbvre, Jean-Michel & Foxworth, Thomas (April 1978). "Vitesse à la italienne: le Macchi M.33, partie 2" [Italian Speed: The Macchi M.33, Part Two]. Le Fana de l'Aviation (in French). No. 101. pp. 12–15. ISSN 0757-4169.
