= Macchia (disambiguation) =

Macchia, or maquis, is a shrubland biome in the Mediterranean region.

Macchia, and its plural Macchie, may also refer to several places in Italy:

== Settlements ==
=== Comuni ===
- Macchia d'Isernia, province of Isernia, Molise
- Macchia Valfortore, province of Campobasso, Molise

=== Frazioni ===
- Macchia, Cerreto di Spoleto
- Macchia, Giarre, Sicily
- Macchia, Montecorvino Rovella, Campania
- Macchie, Castelsantangelo sul Nera, Marche
- Macchie, Castiglione del Lago, Umbria
- Le Macchie, Arcidosso, Tuscany

== Other ==
- Macchie railway station, Bari, Apulia
