= Macchi M.9 =

M.9
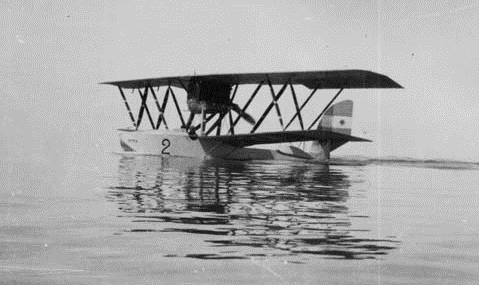
- A M.9 of the Argentine Naval Aviation, circa 1920s

General information
- Type: Flying boat bomber
- National origin: Italy
- Manufacturer: Macchi
- Designer: Alessandro Tonini
- Number built: ca. 30

History
- First flight: 1918

The Macchi M.9 was a flying boat bomber designed by Alessandro Tonini and produced by Macchi in Italy close to the end of World War I and shortly afterwards.

== Design and development ==
The M.9 was a conventional design for its day, with unstaggered biplane wings of unequal span and a single engine mounted pusher-fashion on struts in the interplane gap, close to the underside of the top wing. The pilot and observer sat side by side in an open cockpit. While earlier Macchi flying boats had conventional interplane struts, the M.9 introduced the Warren truss-style struts that would become characteristic of this manufacturer's designs.

Around 16 examples were delivered to the Italian Navy prior to the Armistice, and around another 14 were assembled after the end of hostilities. A small number of postwar aircraft were built with four seats under the designation M.9bis and were used in Switzerland for carrying passengers and mail.

== Operators ==
Argentina

- Argentine Navy
  - Argentine Naval Aviation

Brazil

- Brazilian Naval Aviation

Kingdom of Italy

- Corpo Aeronautico Militare

Poland

- Polish Navy (Naval Aviation Base in Puck)

== Specifications ==
Data from Jane's All the World's Aircraft 1919, p. 390.

General characteristics

- Crew: 2, pilot and observer
- Length: 9.40 m (30 ft 10 in)
- Wingspan: 15.40 m (50 ft 6 in)
- Height: 3.25 m (10 ft 8 in)
- Wing area: 48.5 m^{2} (521 sq ft)
- Empty weight: 1,250 kg (2,750 lb)
- Gross weight: 1,800 kg (3,960 lb)
- Powerplant: 1 × Fiat A.12 , 208 kW (280 hp)

Performance

- Maximum speed: 188 km/h (118 mph, 103 kn)
- Endurance: 4 hours
- Service ceiling: 5,500 m (18,050 ft)

== See also ==
Related lists

- List of seaplanes and flying boats
