= Macchi M.7 =

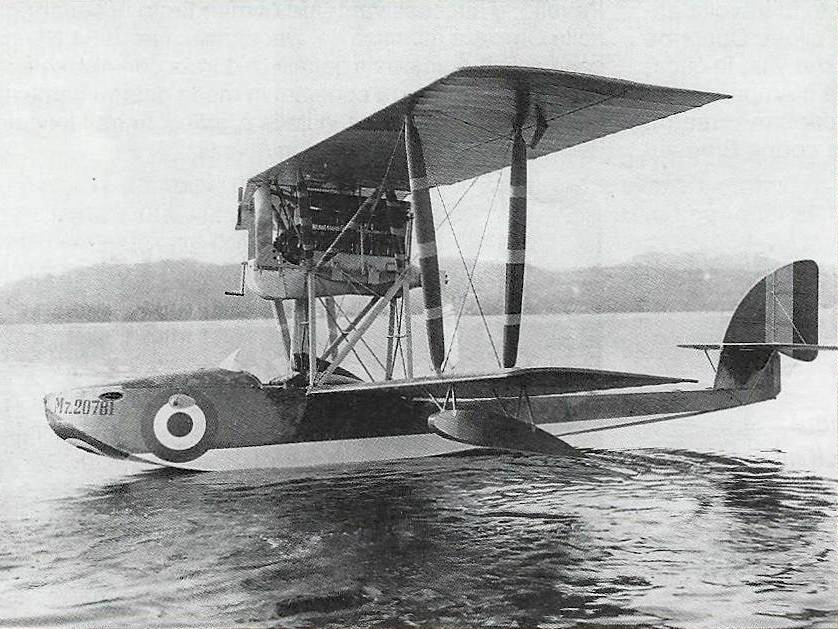
- Macchi M.7 fighter

General information
- Type: single-seat fighter flying-boat
- National origin: Italy
- Manufacturer: Macchi
- Designer: Alessandro Tonini
- Primary user: Italian Navy Aviation
- Number built: 100+

History
- First flight: 1918

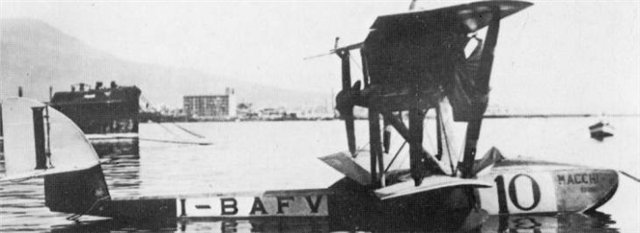
Macchi M.7bis racer

The Macchi M.7 was an Italian single-seat fighter flying boat designed by Alessandro Tonini and built by Macchi. A modified version of the M.7, the M.7bis won the Schneider Trophy in 1921.

== Development ==
The M.7 was similar to the earlier M.5 but had a modified hull and was powered by an Isotta Fraschini V.6 engine. Due to the end of World War I, only 17 aircraft were delivered to the Italian Navy. In 1919, two were sold to Argentina and four to Sweden, and in 1921, Brazil bought three.

In 1920, Tonini designed the M.7bis a racing version of the M.7 for the Schneider Trophy. The M.7bis had a lighter structure and reduced-span wings. Five M.7s entered the 1921 competition at Venice, which was won by Giovanni di Briganti flying the M.7bis. At the 1922 competition at Naples, the M.7bis came in fourth.

In 1923, a revised variant of the M.7, the M.7ter appeared. This had a redesigned hull, revised wing configuration and a new tail unit. Three different versions of the M.7ter were built, including the M.7ter AR, which had folding wings to allow them to operate from the seaplane-carrier Giuseppe Miraglia. In 1924, six Italian naval squadrons were equipped with the M.7ter and over 100 were built. The aircraft was also used as late as 1940 by civilian flying schools.

== Operators ==
Argentina

- Argentine Naval Aviation

Brazil

- Brazilian Naval Aviation

Kingdom of Italy

- Regia Marina
  - Italian Naval Aviation

Paraguay

- Paraguayan Air Force

Sweden

- Swedish Air Force

== Surviving aircraft ==
A single Macchi M.7 has survived to this day. It was built in Italy around 1918 and was used by the Swedish Air Force from 1921 to 1927. It is now on display in the Swedish Air Force Museum with Swedish insignia.

== Specifications (M.7ter) ==
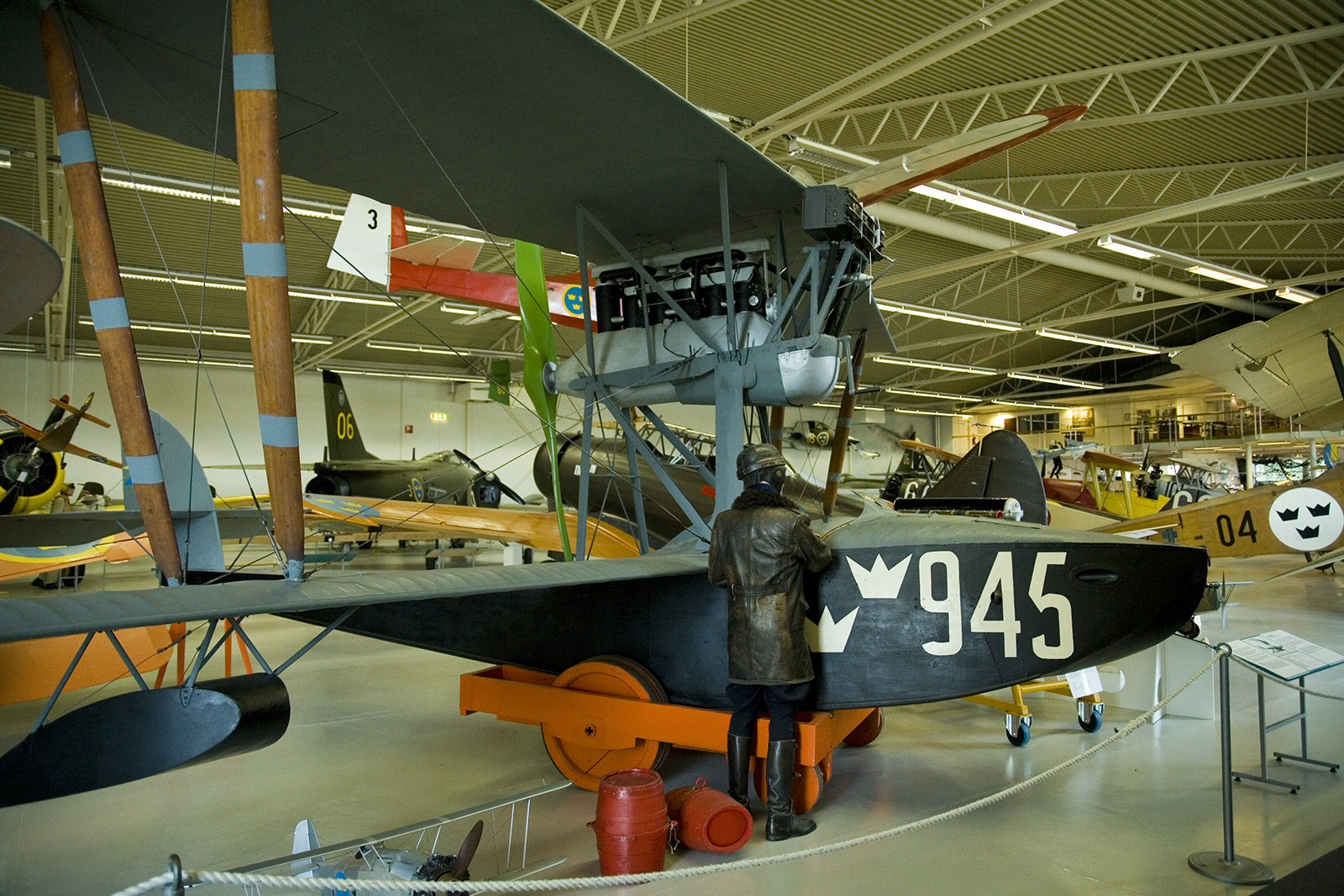
Macchi m7 in Linköping 2006

Data from

General characteristics

- Crew: 1
- Length: 8.09 m (26 ft 6.5 in)
- Wingspan: 9.95 m (32 ft 7.75 in)
- Height: 2.97 m (9 ft 9 in)
- Wing area: 23.50 m^{2} (252.96 sq ft)
- Empty weight: 805 kg (1,775 lb)
- Gross weight: 1,098 kg (2,421 lb)
- Powerplant: 1 × Isotta Fraschini V.6 inline piston engine , 194 kW (260 hp)

Performance

- Maximum speed: 200 km/h (124 mph, 108 kn)
- Endurance: 3 hours 0 minutes
- Service ceiling: 7,000 m (22,965 ft)

Armament

- 2 × 7.7 mm (0.303 in) Vickers machine guns (fixed forward firing in bow)

== See also ==
- Schneider Trophy

Related lists

- List of seaplanes and flying boats
- List of military aircraft of Sweden
