= Aermacchi =

Former Italian aircraft manufacturer

- Type: Private Subsidiary
- Industry: Aerospace
- Founded: 1912
- Founder: Giulio Macchi
- Defunct: 2003
- Fate: Merged
- Successor: Alenia Aermacchi
- Headquarters: Varese, Italy
- Parent: Leonardo S.p.A.
- Website: https://aircraft.leonardo.com/en/home

Aermacchi was an Italian aerospace manufacturer. Formerly known as Aeronautica Macchi, the company was founded in 1912 by Giulio Macchi at Varese in north-western Lombardy as Nieuport-Macchi, to build Nieuport monoplanes under licence for the Italian military. With a factory located on the shores of Lake Varese, the firm originally manufactured a series of Nieuport designs, as well as seaplanes.

After World War II, the company began producing motorcycles as a way to fill the post-war need for cheap, efficient transportation.

The company later specialised in civil and military pilot training aircraft. In July 2003, Aermacchi was integrated into the Finmeccanica Group (now Leonardo) as Alenia Aermacchi, which increased its shareholding to 99%.

== Military trainers ==
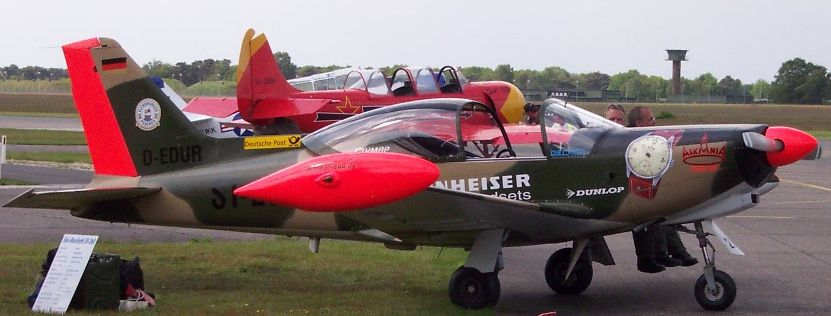
An Aermacchi SF-260

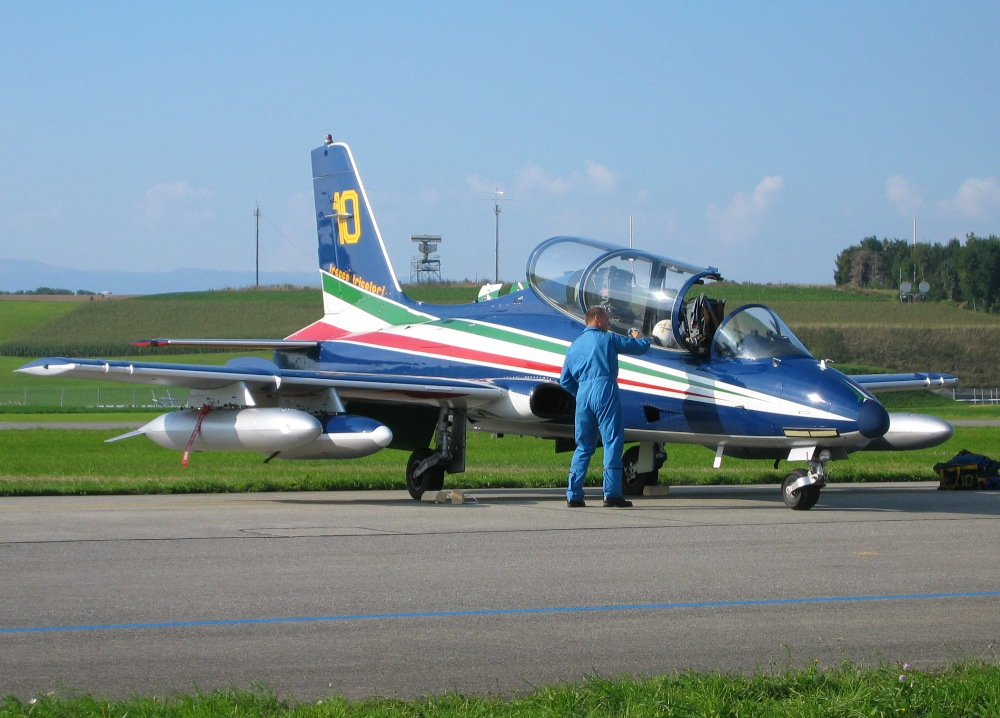
A Frecce Tricolori MB-339A/PAN

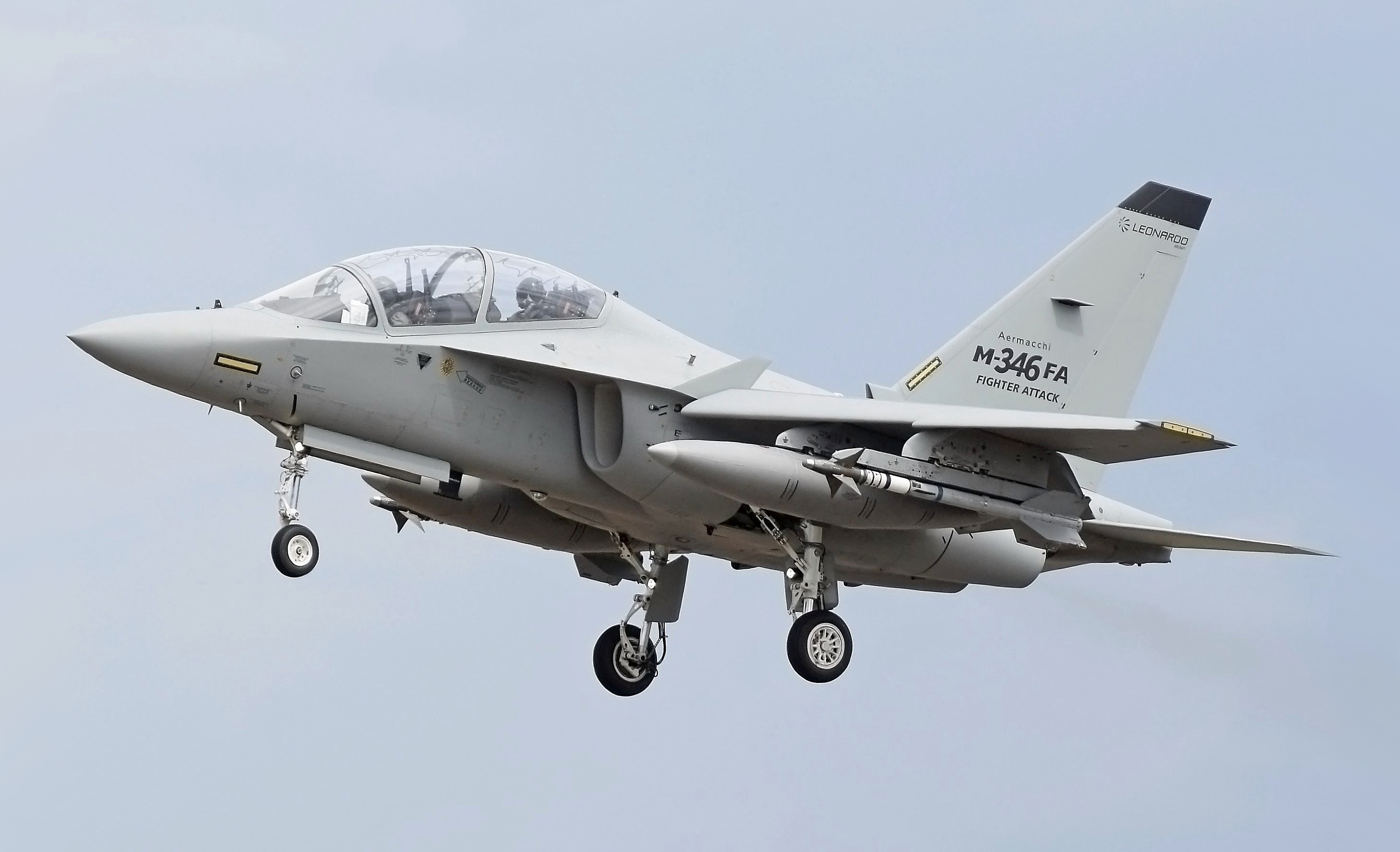
An Aermacchi M-346 military trainer at the 2017 RIAT, RAF Fairford

Since the beginning, the design and production of military trainers have been the core business of Alenia Aermacchi.

The products include:

- SF-260, piston-engined or turboprop-powered screener/primary trainer
- MB-326, turbojet engined trainer and light attack aircraft
- M-311, basic turbofan trainer
- MB-339CD, advanced and lead-in fighter trainer
- M-346, advanced and lead-in fighter trainer of the new generation

== Military collaboration ==
Alenia Aermacchi has cooperated in international military programs:

- AMX program:

Alenia Aermacchi takes part in the AMX program with Alenia Aeronautica and Embraer of Brazil with a total share of 24%. Alenia Aermacchi develops and manufactures the fuselage forward and rear sections and installs some avionic equipment in the aircraft. A Mid-Life Updating program is required by the Italian Air Force to upgrade the aircraft capabilities.

- Panavia Tornado program:

Alenia Aermacchi designs and produces wing pylons and wing tips, roots, trailing edges and flaps, which represents a 5% share in the overall program.

- Eurofighter program:

Alenia Aermacchi has a share of more than 4% in the Eurofighter program, for the design and development of wing pylons, twin missile and twin store carriers, ECM pods, carbon fiber structures and titanium engine cowlings.

- C-27J program:

After participating in the G-222 transport aircraft program, the company is involved in the new Military Transport Aircraft C-27J Spartan, for the production of outer wings.

== Civil programs ==
Since the mid-1990s, Alenia Aermacchi has participated in programs for the supply of engine nacelles for civil aircraft. It produces cold parts for engine nacelles: inlets, fan cowls and EBU, the systems-to-engine interface. In 1999, the company established a joint venture (MHD) with Hurel-Dubois (presently Hurel-Hispano, of SNECMA group). It is a French company specializing in the development and manufacture of thrust reversers, to obtain the full responsibility for the development of nacelles installed on maximum 100-seat aircraft.

== Aermacchi aircraft ==
=== World War I ===
- Macchi L.1 – reconnaissance flying boat (Lohner copy)
- Macchi L.2 – flying boat biplane (Lohner copy)
- Nieuport-Macchi N.VI – reconnaissance monoplane (license-built Nieuport monoplane with local modifications)
- Nieuport-Macchi Parasol – parasol-wing observation monoplane (developed from Nieuport IV) (1913)
- Nieuport-Macchi N.10 – fighter/reconnaissance sesquiplane (license-built Nieuport 10 with local modifications)
- Nieuport-Macchi N.11 – fighter sesquiplane (license-built Nieuport 11 with local modifications)
- Nieuport-Macchi N.17 – fighter sesquiplane (license-built Nieuport 17 with local modifications)
- Macchi M.3 – flying boat biplane (1916)
- Macchi M.5 – flying boat fighter (1917)
- Macchi M.6 – flying boat fighter prototype (1917)
- Macchi M.7 – flying boat fighter (1918)
- Macchi M.8 – reconnaissance/bomber flying boat (1917)
- Macchi M.9 – flying boat bomber (1918)
- Macchi M.12 – flying boat bomber (1918)
- Macchi M.14 – sesquiplane fighter (1918)
- Macchi M.15 – reconnaissance, bomber, and trainer aircraft (1918)

=== Interwar ===
- Nieuport-Macchi N.29 – biplane fighter (license-built Nieuport-Delage NiD.29)
- Macchi M.7bis – Schneider Trophy racing seaplane (1920)
- Macchi M.15bis – a three-seat civil transport variant of the M.15 reconnaissance bomber and trainer aircraft (1922)
- Macchi M.16 – sports aircraft (1919)
- Macchi M.17bis – Schneider Trophy racing seaplane (1922)
- Macchi M.18 – passenger, bombing, and reconnaissance flying boat
- Macchi M.19 – Schneider Trophy racing seaplane (1920)
- Macchi M7ter – flying boat fighter (1923), major redesign of M.7
- Macchi M.20 – civil trainer aircraft (ca. 1919)
- Macchi M.24 – flying boat bomber (1924)
- Macchi M.26 – flying boat fighter prototype (1924)
- Macchi M.33 – Schneider Trophy racing seaplane (1925)
- Macchi M.39 – Schneider Trophy racing seaplane (1926)
- Macchi M.40 – reconnaissance seaplane (1928)
- Macchi M.41 – flying boat fighter (1927)
- Macchi M.52 – Schneider Trophy racing seaplane (1927)
- Macchi M.52R – Schneider Trophy racing seaplane (1929)
- Macchi M.53 – reconnaissance floatplane (1929)
- Macchi M.67 – Schneider Trophy racing seaplane (1929)
- Macchi M.70 – light biplane landplane/floatplane (ca. 1929)
- Macchi M.71 – flying boat fighter (1930)
- Macchi M.C.72 – Schneider Trophy racing seaplane (1931)
- Macchi M.C.73- two-seat tourism plane
- Macchi M.C.94 – flying boat airliner (1935)
- Macchi M.C.100 – passenger flying boat (1939)
- Macchi M.C.200 Saetta – fighter (1939)

=== World War II ===
- Macchi M.C.202 Folgore – fighter (1941)
- Macchi M.C.205 Veltro – fighter (1942)

=== Post-World War II ===
- Macchi M.B.308 – utility aircraft (1948)
- Macchi M.B.320 – light civil utility aircraft (1949)
- Macchi M.B.323 – trainer (1952)
- Aermacchi MB-326 – trainer and light attack aircraft (1957)
- Aermacchi AL-60 – light civil utility aircraft (1959)
- Aermacchi SF.260 – aerobatics aircraft and military trainer (1964)
- Aermacchi MB-335 – initial designation of the AM.3
- Aermacchi AM.3 – military utility aircraft (1967)
- Aermacchi MB-338 – trainer (early 1970s)
- Aermacchi MB-340 – light ground-attack aircraft (early 1970s)
- Aermacchi MB-339 – trainer (1976)
- Aermacchi S-211 – trainer (1981)
- Aermacchi M-290 RediGO – trainer (1985)
- Yak/AEM-130 - trainer and light attack aircraft (1996)
- Alenia Aermacchi M-346 Master – trainer (2004)
- Alenia Aermacchi M-311 – trainer (2005)

== Motorcycles ==
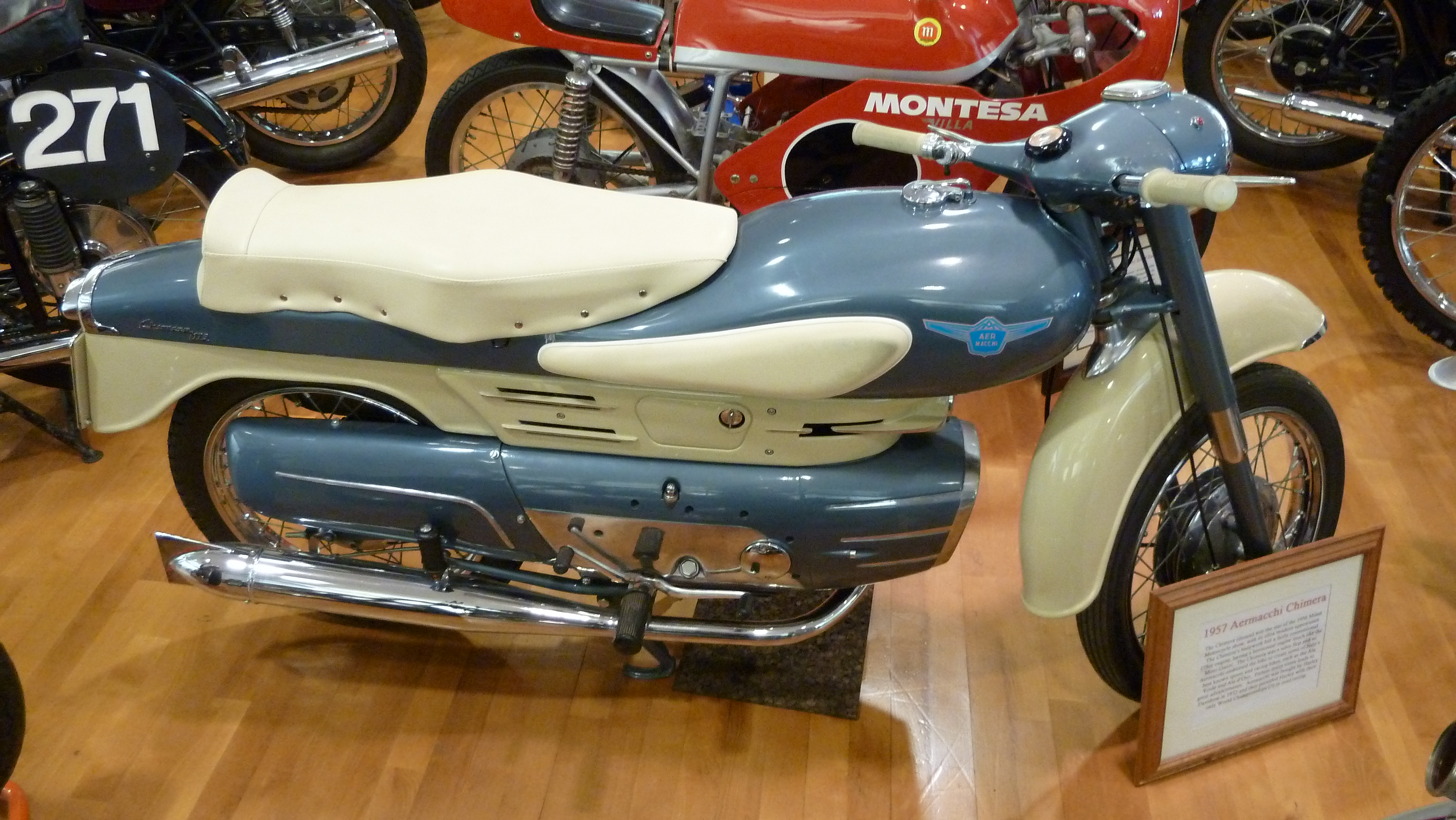
A 1957 Aermacchi Chimera at the Solvang Vintage Motorcycle Museum

=== 1950s ===
Aermacchi began producing motorcycles in c. 1951; the first Aermacchi to be marketed to the public was a scooter/motorcycle hybrid called the 'Convertible', with the majority of working parts semi-enclosed, an under-saddle engine and foot boards, a conventional motorcycle fuel tank position and 17 in (430 mm) wheels.

It was succeeded in 1953 by the 'Zeffiro' which was offered with a 125 cc or 150 cc two-stroke engine; these later models had upgraded suspension but remained similar in appearance.

In 1955, they produced the 125 cc Monsone, followed by the 150 cc Corsaro, both of which had pivoted fork rear suspension and telescopic front forks. They were two-strokes like the early models and ran a 4-speed gearbox.

In 1956 they produced their first over head valve four-stroke engine on the Chimera fitted horizontally, a layout which would become a standard for the marque. Similar to their first offering, the Chimera kept many enclosed working parts.

In 1957 they released a series of sport models, powered by a single cylinder ohv engine in 175 cc or 250 cc displacements. Aermacchi continued with scooter production, but sales were poor and they were unable to compete in the market amongst the well established Vespas and Lambrettas, and concentrated solely on the production of motorcycles.

=== 1960s and beyond ===
In 1960, US business Harley-Davidson motorcycles purchased 50% of Aermacchi's motorcycle division. The Italian branch of the brand was named 'Aermacchi-Harley-Davidson' and the first bike was a variation of the 'Ala Verde' suitably modified for the American market. This was also the year that the Chimera ceased production.

The remaining motorcycle holdings were sold in 1974 to AMF-Harley-Davidson, with motorcycles continuing to be made at Varese.

The business was sold to Cagiva in 1978.

=== Motorsports ===
After the Harley Davidson investment, Aermacchi branched out into racing with a 250 cc production-volume Ala d'Oro for road racing competition. Early results varied but over years of bike development the team placed third during the 1966 350 cc World Championship with racer Renzo Pasolini and third again in 1968 with Kelvin Carruthers. The following year Carruthers competed at the Isle of Man TT.

A new era began in 1971 with the development of twin-cylinder two-stroke racers of 250cc and 350cc capacity, designed at Aermacchi by their chief engineer, Ing. William Soncini. The first 250cc racer was very fast, with 46 hp at 11,000rpm, and weighed only 250 lbs. After Harley-Davidson acquired 100% of Aermacchi in 1972, they funded further racing development at the Aermacchi factory, and the racers were branded with Harley-Davidson on their fuel tanks. These two-stroke twins provided Harley-Davidson with their only Grand Prix wins, and four World Championships: 250cc World Championship in 1974, '75, and '76, and the 350cc World Championship in 1976, all under rider Walter Villa.

=== List of motorcycle models (incomplete) ===
- 250 Cross
- 350
- 500 Linto
- Ala Azzura
- Ala Bianca
- Ala d'Oro (Golden Wing) [1958-1961]
- Ala Rossa
- Ala Verde
- Biccindrico
- Chimera
- Convrtible
- Corsaro
- Drixton
- Monsone
- Sprint 250
- Sprint 350
- Wisconsin 250
- Zeffiro

== See also ==
- List of aircraft manufacturers
- List of Italian companies
- Harley-Davidson Baja 100 off-road motorcycle
