= Carlo Felice Buzio =

Italian engineer, inventor and entrepreneur

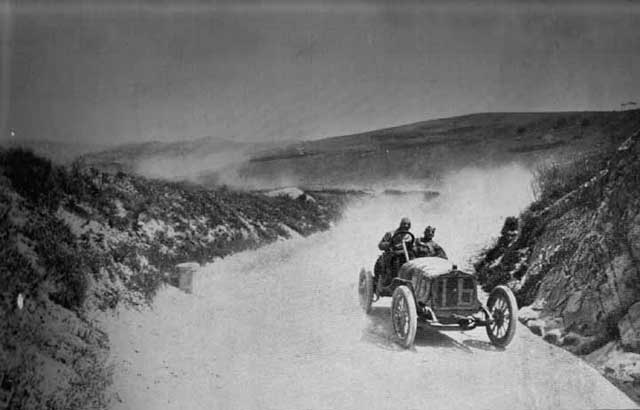
- Buzio (left) in 1907
- Born: 24 March 1866; Vignale Monferrato, Italy
- Died: 11 March 1977 (aged 110); Varese, Italy
- Education: University Engineering at Italy
- Occupations: Engineer, inventor and entrepreneur

Carlo Felice Buzio (24 March 1866 – 11 March 1977) was an Italian engineer, inventor and entrepreneur, aviation pioneer. He was the designer of the Macchi L.2, M.3, M.4, M.5 and M.6 seaplanes, and he also worked on the design and developed the Rainaldi-Corbelli aerial torpedo.

== Biography ==
He was born in Vignale Monferrato on 24 March 1866. After graduating in engineering, he made his first experience in the field of automobile working in the Diatto factory in Turin, then associated with the French Clément-Bayard. To gain experience, he went to Paris, working at the Clément-Bayard plant in the car assembly plant. In those years he also had an intense competitive pilot activity at the wheel of both the Diatto and the Clément-Bayard, and also the Isotta-Fraschini. By guiding the latter he achieved excellent placings in particular in the Milan-San Remo, in the Targhe Florio and in the Bologna Grand Prix.

Together with the engineer Restelli and another partner, he founded the company for the construction of Rebus aircraft engines. In 1912 he made contact with the Aeronautica Macchi for the construction of military airplanes, owned by the engineer Giulio Macchi, and behind his proposal an alliance was established with the French Nieuport, an aircraft manufacturer at the time and already known and appreciated by the Royal Army, by purchasing the relevant production licenses. He was responsible for the designs of several Macchi aircraft, including the first ones, the Macchi L.2, and the Macchi M.3, M.4, M.5 and M.6 seaplanes. In 1917 and 1918 he worked on the construction of the prototypes of the Rainaldi-Corbelli aerial torpedo designed by the engineer Ugo Rainaldi. The captain Adelchi Manzoni organized a financial technical team, consisting of Buzio (aerodynamic), by the company Corbella Corbella & Longoni (engine), by Bovolato (flying unit construction), and the engineer G. Cerri (surveillance), and Rainaldi (bombs and launch systems). From Malpensa the first two prototypes were transferred to air field of Furbara, where a special launch system with hangar and rail was set up. The second prototype was lost due to the explosion of one of the cylinders of the 100 hp Corbella engine during a ground test in May 1918, which caused the death of an unsuspecting spectator. The production was moved from Malpensa to Varese, where he became responsible for the construction of the flight unit, while Rainaldi for the control and launch systems. After the construction of two further prototypes, all lost during the test flights, the end of the First World War put an end to all development activities.

Settling permanently in Varese, he moved from aeronautical to automotive engines, opening in Via Orrigoni a mechanical workshop with an adjoining garage of the Alfa Romeo dealership. After the armistice of 8 September 1943, in order to avoid requisitions by the Germans and the fascists, he dismantled several cars and hid the pieces which then, at the end of the war, reassembled with care and precision selling the vehicles. Starting in 1950, and in the following years, he sold the Lambrettas in large quantities, and then expanded his business by transferring it to via Belforte, becoming the concessionaire for the sale of motorcycles and cars, and therefore of the Mini Morris and BMW, always assisted by his wife, Mrs. Olimpia Macecchini. Buzio died on 11 March 1977 aged 110 years old at Varese.

== Notes ==
1. ^ Among those cars there was also a Fiat 500 Topolino belonging to a well-known professional from Varese, which was later donated to Monsignor Tarcisio Pigionatti for his intense civil and religious activities.
