= Italian seaplane carrier Europa =

Italian seaplane carrier

- Europa shortly after completing her conversion

History

Italy
- Name: Europa
- Builder: Charles Connell and Company, Glasgow
- Launched: 4 August 1895
- Acquired: 6 February 1915
- Commissioned: 6 October 1915
- Stricken: 1920
- Fate: Broken up

General characteristics As a seaplane carrier
- Type: Seaplane carrier
- Displacement: 6,400 metric tons (6,300 long tons; 7,100 short tons) (normal); 8,805 metric tons (8,666 long tons; 9,706 short tons) (full load)
- Length: 119.5 m (392 ft 1 in) lwl; 123.1 m (403 ft 10 in) oa
- Beam: 14 m (45 ft 11 in)
- Draft: 5.8 to 8.6 m (19 ft 0 in to 28 ft 3 in)
- Installed power: 2,594 ihp (1,934 kW)
- Propulsion: 1 triple-expansion engine
- Speed: 12.2 knots (22.6 km/h; 14.0 mph)
- Armament: 2 × 3 in (76 mm) anti-aircraft guns
- Aircraft carried: 8 × seaplanes
- Aviation facilities: 2 hangars

Europa was a seaplane carrier of the Italian Regia Marina (Royal Navy). Originally laid down as the merchant ship Manila, she was renamed Salacia in 1898, and then sold to German and then Italian shipping companies in 1911 and 1913, respectively. She became Quarto in 1913, and in February 1915 she was purchased by the Italian fleet, renamed Europa, and converted into a seaplane carrier with a capacity of eight seaplanes. She served as a seaplane base in Valona during World War I and supported the Allied response during the Battle of the Strait of Otranto in 1917. She was quickly sold for scrap in 1920 after the war ended.

== Original characteristics and career ==
Originally built for the Spanish company Pinillos, Izquierdo & Cia as the merchant steamer Manila, she was laid down in 1895 in Scotland, at the Charles Connell and Company shipyard in Glasgow. Built as yard number 222, she was launched on 5 July and completed in August that year. In 1898, she was sold to Donaldson Bros of Glasgow, Scotland, and renamed Salacia. Retaining the name Salacia, she was sold to the Hamburg-based German shipping company M. Jebsen in 1912. She was sold to the Italian company Tito Campanella in Genoa in 1913 and renamed Quarto in 1914.

Manila was 119.5 meters (392 ft 1 in) long at the waterline and 123.1 m (403 ft 10 in) long overall. She had a beam of 14 m (45 ft 11 in). She had a gross register tonnage of 4,134 GRT, with a net register tonnage of 2,636. Her hull was divided into four holds, two forward and two aft, divided by the central superstructure. She had a short forecastle and quarterdeck, as was common for merchant vessels of the day.

The ship was powered by a single vertical triple-expansion engine. Steam was provided by three coal-fired boilers trunked into two raked funnels located amidships. Both the engines and boilers were manufactured by Dunsmuir & Jackson of Govan, Scotland. Her propulsion system was rated for a top speed of 12 knots (22 km/h; 14 mph) from 3,000 indicated horsepower (2,200 kW), and on speed trials she reached 12.2 knots (22.6 km/h; 14.0 mph) from 2,594 ihp (1,934 kW). She carried 600 t (590 long tons; 660 short tons) of coal, which gave her a range of 2,750 nautical miles (5,090 km; 3,160 mi) at a speed of 11 knots (20 km/h; 13 mph). When originally built, she also had four derricks that could be rigged with two square and lug sails, but these were quickly replaced with two smaller derricks between each pair of holds.

== Background and conversion ==
The Italian Regia Marina had previously experimented with seaplane carriers with the conversion of the protected cruiser Elba in 1914. The ship proved that the concept was viable for the Italian fleet, though she had significant limitations, particularly with regard to conducting sustained operations, as she could only carry a maximum of five aircraft and she lacked room for maintenance facilities or magazines for the aircraft. The British raid on Cuxhaven, launched from seaplane carries in December 1914, impressed upon the Italians for the need for further development of the Italian naval air arm. Accordingly, the navy requested funding to purchase a merchant ship and convert it into a seaplane carrier, which was approved in the year's naval budget.

At the time, the Italian naval command recognized that the relatively confined nature of the Mediterranean Sea, and particularly the Adriatic Sea shared by its historic rival Austria-Hungary, meant that land-based planes would bear the bulk of the combat responsibilities. The command envisioned using the new seaplane carrier as a semi-stationary floating base for aircraft. At the time, the most pressing need was for a seaplane base at Valona, where it would be used to help secure the Otranto Barrage. Captain Alessandro Guidoni led a commission to find a suitable vessel for the project, and among the vessels surveyed was the steamship Quarto, then docked in Taranto. Guidoni selected the ship in his report that was submitted on 9 January 1915. The Naval Staff concurred and purchased it, and in addition to a seaplane carrier, the ship would also be used as a submarine tender.

On 6 February 1915, the Regia Marina purchased the vessel to convert her into a seaplane tender. She arrived in La Spezia later that month, where work began on 20 February. Guidoni had drawn up the plans for the conversion, which was completed by early May. Most of her original fittings were removed and hangars, workshops, and storage facilities were erected. Her holds were converted into storage tanks for aircraft fuel and lubricants as well as for compartments to store aircraft components. Equipment to service submarines, including engines to recharge their batteries, was also installed. The high length to beam ratio of the ship proved to be a challenge in the conversion process, since the hangars and other structures added to her decks increased her topweight and reduced her stability, already a problem from her relatively narrow beam. As a result, several tons of ballast were added to help stabilize the vessel.

=== General characteristics ===
After her conversion, her overall length increased to 125.3 m (411 ft 1 in) and her displacement became 8,739 metric tons (8,601 long tons; 9,633 short tons) normally and up to 8,800 metric tons (8,700 long tons; 9,700 short tons) at full load. Her draft varied from 5.8 m (19 ft 0 in) normally and 7.7 m (25 ft 3 in) at full load. The short forecastle and quarterdeck were extended to make the ship flush-decked, though the sides remained open to provide ventilation and light to what had been the upper deck. Since the forward hangar blocked the old bridge, a new one was installed atop the hangar, composed of a small deckhouse with a gangway that ran across the deck. A single pole mast was placed directly behind the old bridge, which was now used as a chart house, and in front of the first funnel. Forward visibility was poor, so lookouts had to be stationed in the crow's nest or on the searchlight platform in front of the hangar. Her crew numbered 11 officers and 155 enlisted men in 1915, and by 1918 this had increased to 14 officers and 195 men, respectively.

Her crew numbered 11 officers and 155 enlisted men in 1915, and by 1918 this had increased to 14 officers and 195 men, respectively. She carried a number of small boats, including a 10.5 m (34 ft) steam pinnace, two 10 m (33 ft) motor boats, two 9 m (30 ft) whaleboats, and five smaller boats. The larger boats were stored amidships and served by two davits on each side, while the smaller boats were kept inside the hangars.

Since she was classified as an auxiliary vessel, her only armament consisted of a pair of guns for defense. Europa was armed with a two 76 mm (3.0 in) 40-caliber anti-aircraft guns that were mounted on platforms, one at the bow and the other at the stern. They were placed high above the deck to provide them with the widest possible fields of fire despite the large hangars.

=== Aviation facilities and equipment ===
As converted, she was equipped with two hangars that could store four seaplanes each; the forward hangar was 34 m (112 ft) long and the aft one was 37 m (121 ft) long, and they covered the full beam of the ship. The narrowness of the ship prevented aircraft from being stowed sideways in the hangars, so they were held in-line. The hangars had completely opened sides that could be sealed with waterproof tarps Cranes were fitted to lower and raise the aircraft into the water, where they would take off or land. A further four to eight aircraft could be kept disassembled below decks. Fuel storage amounted to 770 cubic meters (27,000 cu ft), which was divided between thirty-two separate tanks. The extensive subdivision of the tanks improved stability by dispersing the weight of fuel and minimized the effect of moving liquid in the hull.

In the forward part of the hull, a large workshop was installed, fitted with various lathes, milling machines, forges, and other equipment necessary to repair or fabricate wood and metal parts for both aircraft and submarines. Below the workshop was an ammunition magazine for aircraft and a refrigerated torpedo storage room. In 1917–1918, a second workshop was installed in the stern of the ship in an area that had been used for parts storage. Two 65 kW (87 hp) electrical generators and two 50 kW (67 hp) generators were installed to recharge submarine batteries.

=== Aircraft ===
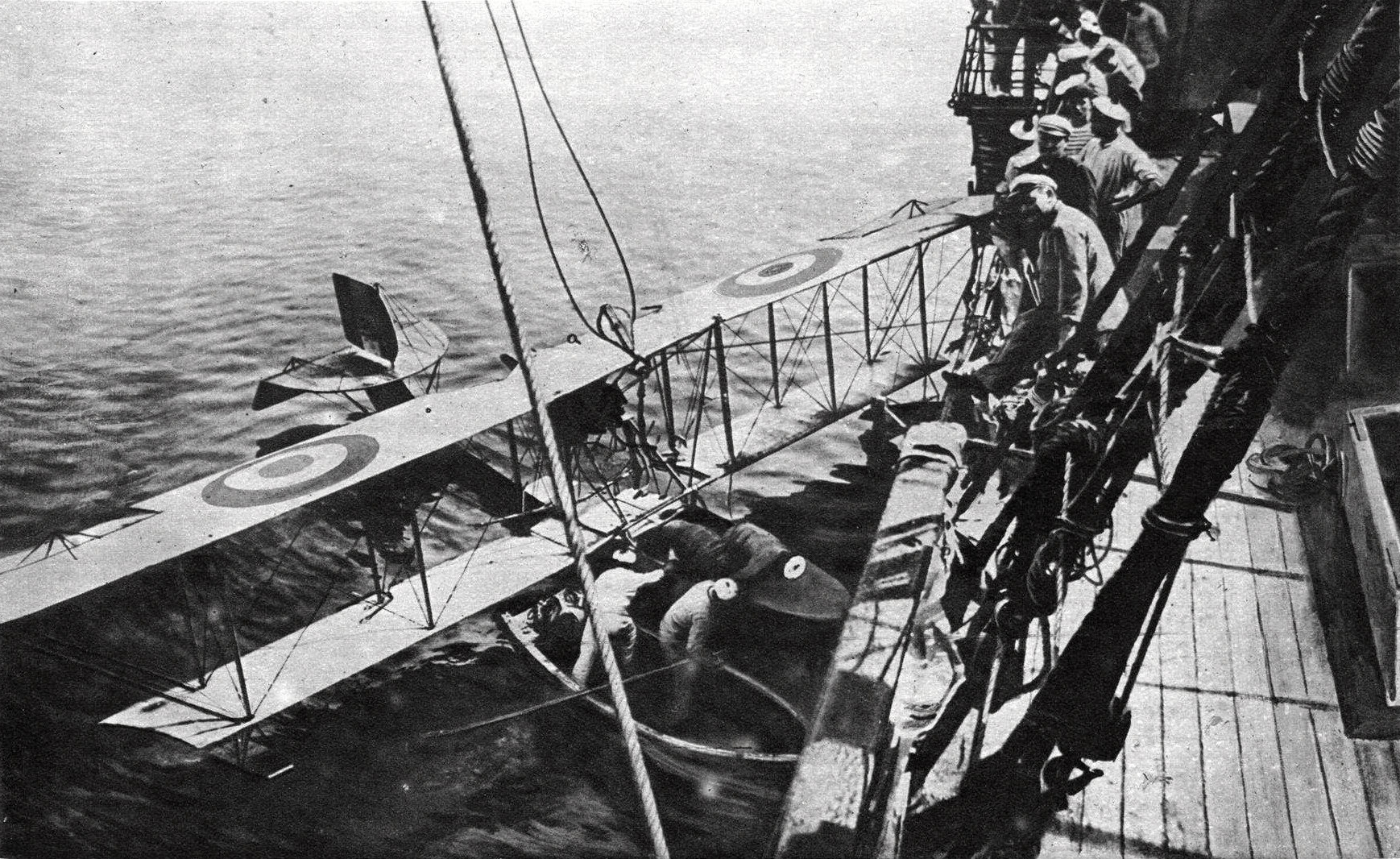
An FBA Type C in French service being hoisted above the French carrier French seaplane carrier Foudre, similar to the aircraft carried by Europa

Europa originally carried a complement of Macchi L.1 seaplanes and Curtiss Model H flying boats. The L.1 was used as a fighter and a bomber, while the Model H was used for training and limited bombing operations, as it was an older design that had been superseded by more modern aircraft. These included Macchi L.2 and M.3 flying boats beginning in 1916. In 1917, the ship received Macchi M.5 seaplanes, which were dedicated fighters. The ship also carried FBA seaplanes between 1916 and 1918 for bombing and anti-submarine patrols. From June to November 1918, Europa operated a few Ansaldo SVAI seaplane fighters, though these proved to be unreliable and not particularly maneuverable.

== Service history ==
After completing the conversion in May 1915, the ship spent much of the rest of the year assembling and training the crew and conduct sea trials. She received her 76 mm guns in September, and she was formally commissioned into the fleet on 6 October. That month, she was sent to Brindisi, where she replaced Elba. By December, she was operating a contingent of two Curtiss flying boats and six of the L.1 seaplanes, along with two more L.1s that were kept ashore. The ship was transferred to Valona Bay in Albania, part of which Italy had occupied in October 1914. Valona lacked any harbor facilities beyond the outer moles, and so the ability to operate aircraft under such conditions proved to be invaluable. A host of other support vessels, including depot ships, oilers, and floating docks were stationed there as well. At the time, the Italian strategy relied on Valona and Brindisi to contain the Austro-Hungarian squadron based at Cattaro; Europa provided an important aerial reconnaissance force in support of this strategy. The ship was anchored in the center of the bay, and at that time she operated eight of the L.1s, which were used to defend the bay, to patrol for Austro-Hungarian and German U-boats operating in the Adriatic, and to attack Austro-Hungarian coastal installations.

In mid-May 1917, Europa's aircraft took part in the Battle of the Strait of Otranto. She had three aircraft ready the morning of the battle on 15 May, and after reports of the Austro-Hungarian attack reached the Italian command, her aircraft—FBA flying boats—sortied to search for the hostile vessels at 05:00, once there was enough light to see. At 07:00, they returned, refueled, loaded bombs, and departed again. The destroyer Augusto Riboty came alongside at 08:00 and took on fuel from Europa, departing at 09:45 to join the search. The first FBA attacked the Austro-Hungarian cruiser Helgoland but scored only a near miss that knocked out some rivets in her rudder. The FBAs shadowed the Austro-Hungarians before returning to Europa to refuel.

On 16 July, Europa's aircraft raided Durazzo in company with two other units; five of her M.5s joined three FBAs based in Brindisi and seven other aircraft from the 257th Squadron, an Italian Army unit in Valona. The aircraft scored thirty-three hits on the Austro-Hungarian naval air station in the harbor and significantly degraded its ability to conduct operations for several months. Over the course of the war, the ship's aircrews flew a total of 1,884 missions, of which 1,500 were reconnaissance flights and more than 200 were combat sorties, during which they dropped some 2,000 bombs. Toward the end of the war, her aircraft were sent ashore and Europa operated primarily as a submarine tender.

After Austria-Hungary surrendered in November 1918, Europa took part in the occupation of Šibenik and other ports in Dalmatia. In 1919, she returned to Taranto and then to La Spezia. In the postwar period, naval aviation fell out of favor, particularly as a result of Giulio Douhet's views on air power, namely his preference for strategic bombing over other types of tactical and operational doctrines. In addition, Europa was by then more than twenty years old and her low speed kept her from operating with the main fleet and conducting offensive operations. As a result, she was decommissioned on 10 September 1920 and thereafter broken up for scrap in Italy.
