= List of Italian inventors =

This is a list of Italian inventors:

== A ==
- Archimedes
- Giovanni Battista Amici

== B ==
- Flavio Baracchini
- Eugenio Barsanti
- Robert Ludvigovich Bartini
- Enrico Bernardi
- Gianni Bettini
- Alfonso Bialetti
- Lucio Bini
- Augusto Bissiri
- Claudio Bordignon
- Enea Bossi, Sr.
- Giovanni Branca
- Francesco Antonio Broccu
- Luigi Valentino Brugnatelli
- Tito Livio Burattini
- Carlo Felice Buzio

== C ==
- Temistocle Calzecchi-Onesti
- Tullio Campagnolo
- Secondo Campini
- Mario Capecchi
- Arturo Caprotti
- Gerolamo Cardano
- Antonio Benedetto Carpano
- Giovanni Caselli
- Ugo Cerletti
- Leonardo Chiariglione
- Alberto Ciaramella
- Giuseppe Cipriani
- Francesco Cirio
- Bartolomeo Cristofori
- Alessandro Cruto

== D ==
- Luigi Dadda
- Salvino D'Armate
- Corradino D'Ascanio
- Leonardo da Vinci
- Raimondo di Sangro
- Giuseppe Donati

== F ==
- Francesco Faà di Bruno
- Fabio Perini
- Gabriele Falloppio
- Federico Faggin
- Enrico Fermi
- Salvatore Ferragamo
- Galileo Ferraris
- Pietro Ferrero
- Carlo Forlanini
- Enrico Forlanini

== G ==
- Galileo Galilei
- Luigi Galvani
- Gasparo da Salò
- Giovanni Francesco Gemelli Careri
- Flavio Gioja
- Giuseppe di Giugno
- Guido of Arezzo

== J ==
- Candido Jacuzzi

== K ==
- Pedro Kanof

== L ==
- Ruggero Lenci
- Leonardo da Vinci
- Domingo Liotta
- Cesare Lombroso
- Vincenzo Lunardi
- Giovanni Luppis

== M ==
- Amatino Manucci
- Innocenzo Manzetti
- Guglielmo Marconi
- Felice Matteucci
- Antonio Meucci
- Guido Monaco
- Maria Montessori
- Angelo Moriondo

== N ==
- Giulio Natta

== P ==
- Antonio Pacinotti
- Luigi Palmieri
- Enzo Paoletti
- Pier Giorgio Perotto
- Ignazio Porro
- Giambattista della Porta
- Francesco Procopio dei Coltelli

== R ==
- Giuseppe Ravizza

== S ==
- Sanctorius
- Raimondo di Sangro
- Antonio Sant'Elia
- Ascanio Sobrero
- Nazareno Strampelli

== T ==
- Gasparo Tagliacozzi
- Teseo Tesei
- Luigi Torchi
- Evangelista Torricelli
- Pellegrino Turri
- Juanelo Turriano

== V ==
- Alessandro Volta
- Andrew Viterbi

== Z ==
- Ildebrando Zacchini
- Giuseppe Zamboni
- Girolamo Zenti
