= Lohner E =

Reconnaissance flying boat built in Austria-Hungary during World War I

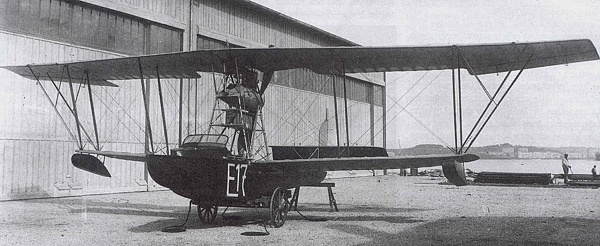
- Lohner E number E17 circa 1914

General information
- Type: Reconnaissance flying boat
- National origin: Austria-Hungary
- Manufacturer: Lohner
- Number built: approximately 40

History
- First flight: 10 November 1913

The Lohner E was a reconnaissance flying boat built in Austria-Hungary during World War I. The "E" stood for Igo Etrich, one of the Lohner engineers. It was a conventional design for its day with biplane wings that featured slight sweepback, and an engine mounted pusher-fashion in the interplane gap. Its crew of two was seated in an open cockpit.

Around 40 examples were built before production shifted to the more powerful L.

== Operators ==
- Austria-Hungary

== Specifications ==

Data from The Encyclopedia of World War I

General characteristics

- Crew: Two, pilot and observer
- Length: 10.25 m (33 ft 8 in)
- Wingspan: 16.20 m (53 ft 2 in)
- Height: 3.85 m (12 ft 8 in)
- Gross weight: 1,700 kg (3,747 lb)
- Powerplant: 1 × Hiero 85 hp , 67 kW (85 hp)

Performance

- Maximum speed: 105 km/h (65 mph, 56 kn)
- Endurance: 4 hours
- Service ceiling: 4,000 m (13,120 ft)

== See also ==
Related lists

- List of flying boats and floatplanes

== Bibliography ==
- Angelucci, Enzo. The Rand McNally Encyclopedia of Military Aircraft, 1914-1980. San Diego, California: The Military Press, 1983. ISBN 0-517-41021-4.
- Taylor, Michael J. H. Jane's Encyclopedia of Aviation. London: Studio Editions, 1989. ISBN 0-517-69186-8.
- Tucker, Spencer. The Encyclopedia of World War I. Santa Barbara: ABC-Clio, 2005. ISBN 978-1851094202.
