= Macchi M.6 =

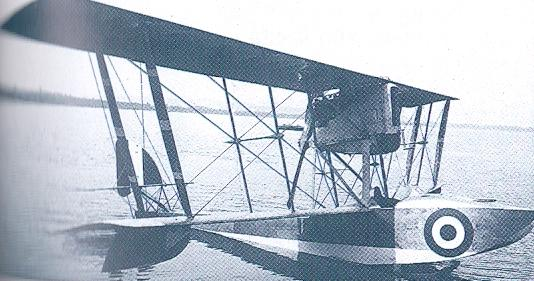

General information
- Type: Flying boat fighter prototype
- National origin: Italy
- Manufacturer: Macchi
- Primary user: Italy
- Number built: 1

History
- First flight: 1917
- Variant: Macchi M.5

The Macchi M.6 was an Italian flying boat fighter prototype of 1917.

== Design and development ==
In 1917, Nieuport-Macchi built the M.6. for comparison with its Macchi M.5 flying boat fighter, which went into service that year and operated successfully over the Adriatic Sea against Austro-Hungarian forces during World War I. The M.6 was identical to the M.5 in most respects; like the M.5, it was a single-seat wooden biplane flying boat fighter with plywood and fabric skin, powered by a 139-kilowatt (187-brake horsepower) Isotta Fraschini V.4B engine mounted on struts above the hull and below the upper wing, driving a pusher propeller. Its cockpit was beneath the radiator, it was armed with a single 7.7-millimeter (0.303-inch) Vickers machine gun, and its hull was of the same design. It differed from the M.5 in having a different wing cellule; instead of the interplane Vee struts used in the M.5 to brace the wings and the smaller Vee struts used in the M.5 to support the overhanging leading edge of the upper wing, the M.6 had parallel steel tube struts. The outermost of a set of parallel struts were placed farther outboard in the M.6 than the Vee struts in the M.5, and the M.6 had additional parallel struts closer to the hull.

Comparative trials were held between the M.6 prototype and standard M.5 aircraft to evaluate whether the M.6's revised wing cellule provided any advantage over that of the M.5 fighter. It did not, so further development of the M.6 was abandoned and no more M.6 aircraft were built.

== Operators ==
Kingdom of Italy

- Corpo Aeronautico Militare

== Specifications ==
Data from Green, William, and Gordon Swanborough The Complete Book of Fighters: An Illustrated Encyclopedia of Every Fighter Aircraft Built and Flown, New York: SMITHMARK Publishers, 1994, ISBN 0-8317-3939-8

General characteristics

- Crew: one
- Length: 8.15 m (26 ft 8.88 in)
- Wingspan: 11.90 m (39 ft 1 in)
- Height: 3.00 m (9 ft 10 in)
- Wing area: 29.00 m^{2} (312.16 sq ft)
- Empty weight: 760 kg (1,675 lb)
- Gross weight: 1,030 kg (2,271 lb)
- Max takeoff weight: 1,030 kg (2,271 lb)
- Powerplant: 1 × Isotta Fraschini V.4B six-cylinder piston , 139 kW (187 hp)

Performance

- Maximum speed: 189 km/h (117 mph, 102 kn)
- Cruise speed: 152 km/h (94 mph, 82 kn)
- Endurance: 3 hours
- Rate of climb: 3.33333 m/s (650 ft/min)

Armament

- 1 × 7.7-millimeter (0.303-inch) Vickers machine gun

Notes:

- Time to 4,000 m (13,123 ft): 20 min

== See also ==
- Alenia Aermacchi

Aircraft of comparable role, configuration, and era

- Macchi M.5

Related lists

- List of seaplanes and flying boats
