= Lohner L =

Austria-Hungarian World War I flying boat

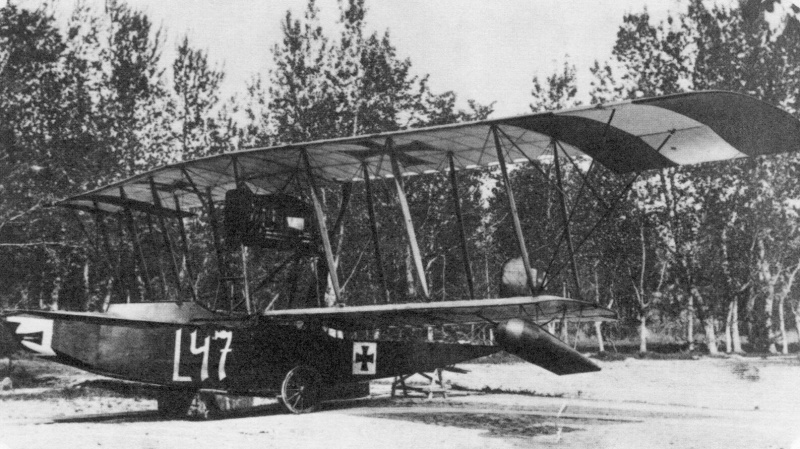

General information
- Type: Reconnaissance flying boat
- National origin: Austria-Hungary
- Manufacturer: Lohner, UFAG, Hansa-Brandenburg, Macchi
- Number built: >100

History
- First flight: ca. 1915

The Lohner L was a reconnaissance flying boat produced in Austria-Hungary during World War I. It was a two-bay biplane of typical configuration for the flying boats of the day, with its pusher engine mounted on struts in the interplane gap. The pilot and observer sat side by side in an open cockpit, and both the upper and lower sets of wings featured sweepback.

== Development ==
The design was essentially a more powerful version of the Lohner E, and became highly influential. Apart from licensed production by UFAG, the L provided the basis for designs by other major manufacturers. In Germany, Hansa-Brandenburg manufactured a modified version of it as their first flying boat, the Brandenburg FB. In Italy, a captured example was used as a pattern aircraft by Macchi, who produced it as the L.1. In turn, the L.1 would provide the foundation for a large number of Macchi designs over the coming years.

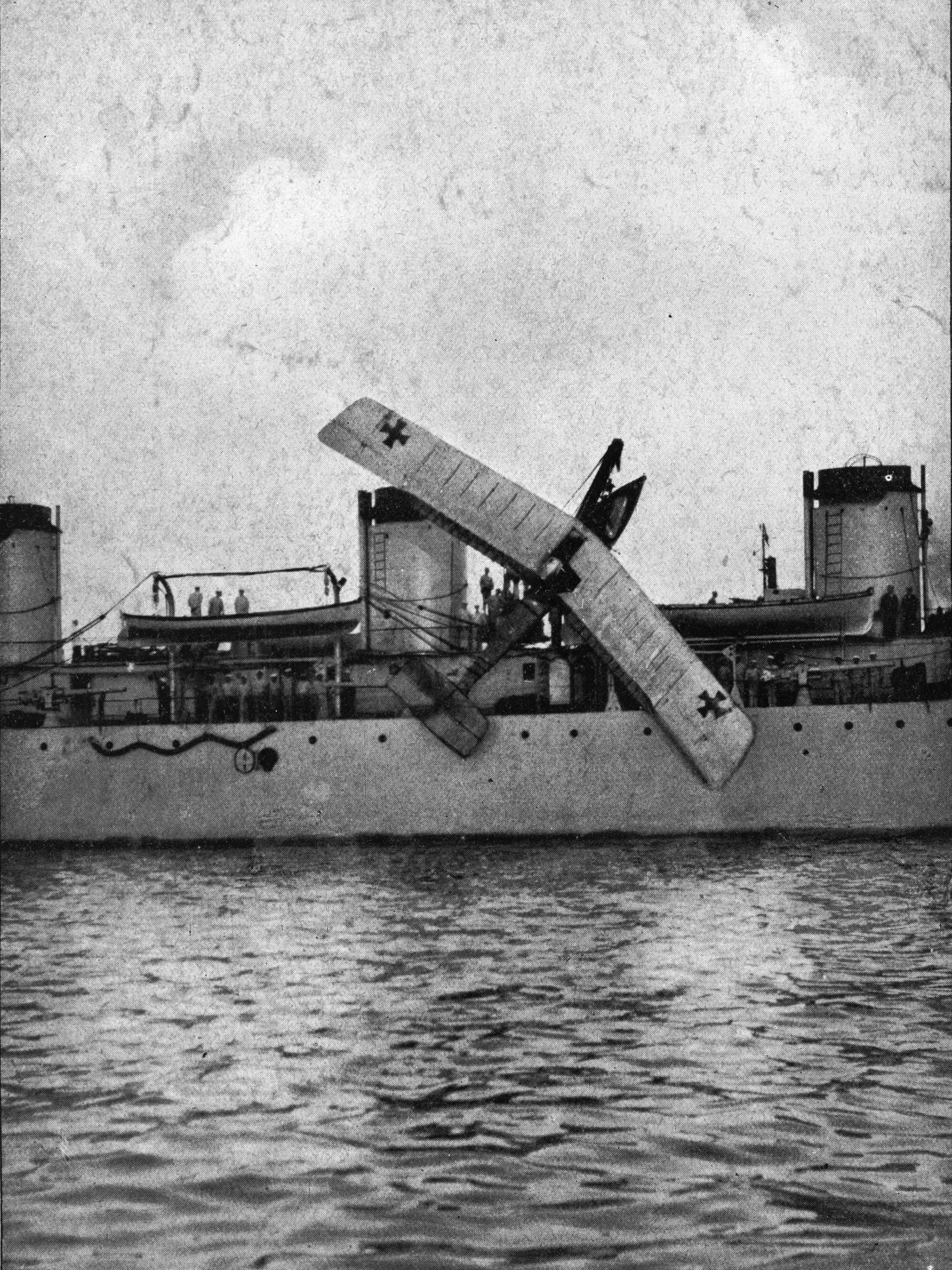
KUK hydroplane aircraft salvaged at Grado, Italy.

The captured aircraft (serial L.40) was taken intact near the naval air station of Porto Corsini. The captured flying boat was copied by Macchi-Nieuport and the L.1 was built within a month. The L.1s were delivered to Italian maritime reconnaissance and bombing units based on the Adriatic. An improved version was developed as the Macchi L.2.

A restored example of an Austro-Hungarian Lohner L (serial L.127) is preserved at the Italian Air Force Museum, located on the former Vigna di Valle Air Base in Bracciano near Rome.

== Operational history ==
Lohner seaplanes saw extensive use before and during World War I, and those aircraft that survived the war served for several years. Some important and interesting events are related, such as:

- Immediately after the declaration of war by Austria-Hungary on Serbia and Montenegro, from 28 July 1914 to 2 August 1914, Lohner L seaplanes from Kumbor patrolled and photographed the Montenegrin artillery positions, representing the first use of aircraft in World War I.
- On 16 September 1915 Lohner L 132 piloted by a Lieutenant Commander Dimitrije Konjović and Lohner L 135 piloted by Walter Železni, on regular reconnaissance missions off Cattaro found the French Brumaire-class submarine Foucault and attacked it with bombs. The submarine was damaged in the attack and was abandoned by her crew. One Lohner flying boat landed at sea, captured two French officers and transported them to Kumbor. The other members of the crew were rescued by an Austro-Hungarian torpedo boat. This was the first sinking of a submarine from the air in the history of aviation.

== Variants ==
- Lohner L
- Lohner R - Photo-reconnaissance version
- Lohner S - Trainer version
- Macchi L.1 - with Fiat machine gun and Isotta-Fraschini V.4a engine (14 built)

== Operators ==
Austria-Hungary

- Austro-Hungarian Navy

German Empire

- Kaiserliche Marine

Kingdom of Italy

- Regia Marina (Macchi L.1)

Kingdom of Yugoslavia

- Yugoslav Royal Navy - 4 aircraft Lohner TL

== Specifications (Lohner L) ==
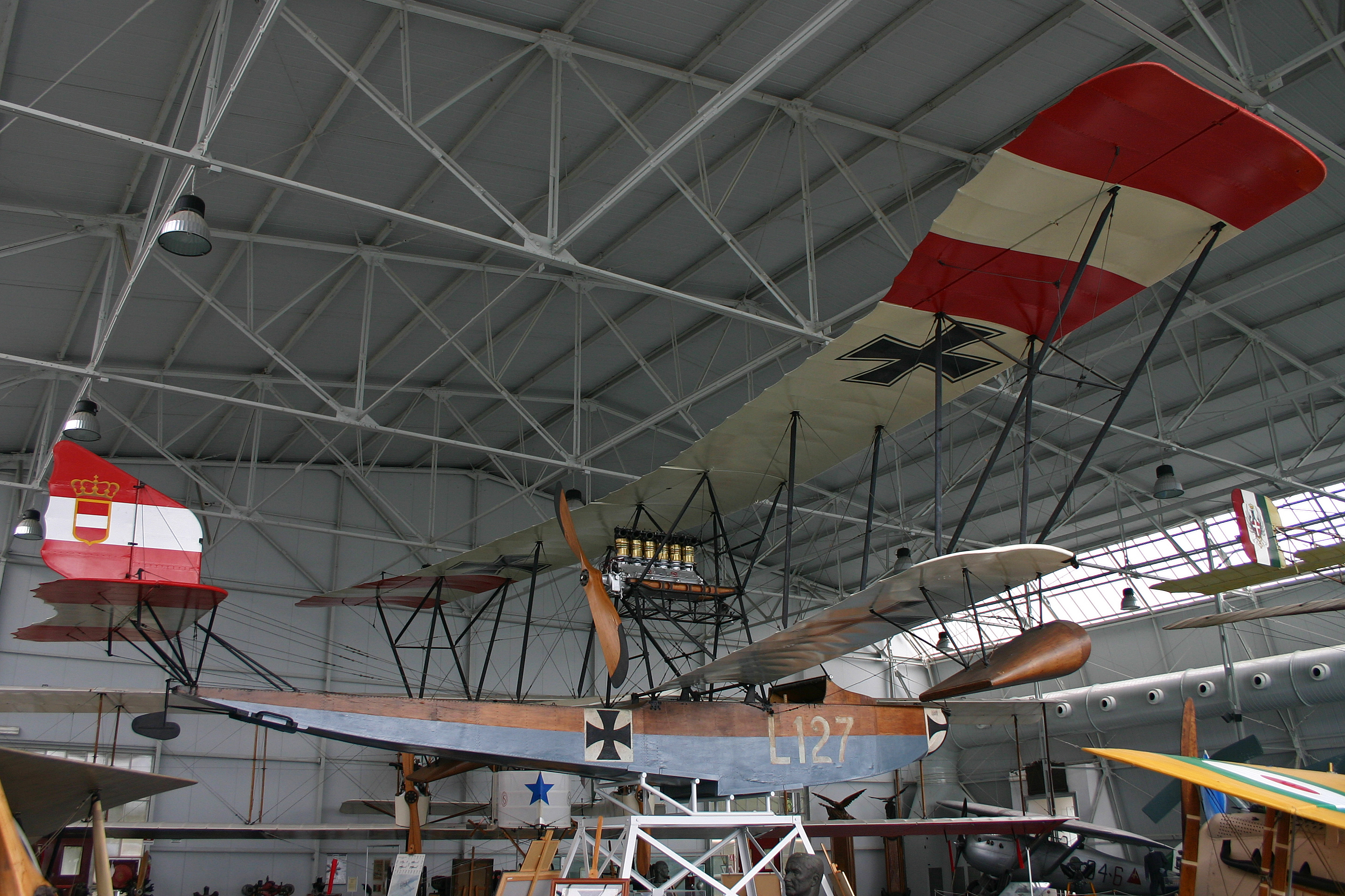
Restored Lohner L-1 preserved at the Italian Air Force Museum.

General characteristics

- Crew: two, pilot and observer
- Length: 10.26 m (33 ft 8 in)
- Wingspan: 16.2 m (53 ft 2 in)
- Height: 3.85 m (12 ft 8 in)
- Wing area: 53 m^{2} (570 sq ft)
- Empty weight: 1,150 kg (2,535 lb)
- Gross weight: 1,700 kg (3,748 lb)
- Powerplant: 1 × Austro-Daimler 160hp 6-cyl. water-cooled in-line piston engine, 120 kW (160 hp)
- Propellers: 2-bladed fixed-pitch propeller

Performance

- Maximum speed: 105 km/h (65 mph, 57 kn)
- Range: 600 km (370 mi, 320 nmi)
- Service ceiling: 2,500 m (8,200 ft)
- Wing loading: 32.0 kg/m^{2} (6.6 lb/sq ft)
- Power/mass: 0.070 kW/kg (0.043 hp/lb)

Armament

- Guns: 1 × trainable machine gun for observer
- Bombs: 200 kg (440 lb) of bombs

== See also ==
Related development

- Lohner E
- Macchi L.2
- Macchi M.3

Aircraft of comparable role, configuration, and era

- Donnet-Denhaut flying boat
- FBA Type H

Related lists

- List of maritime patrol aircraft
- List of flying boats and floatplanes
- List of World War I Central Powers aircraft
