= Corbellati Missile =

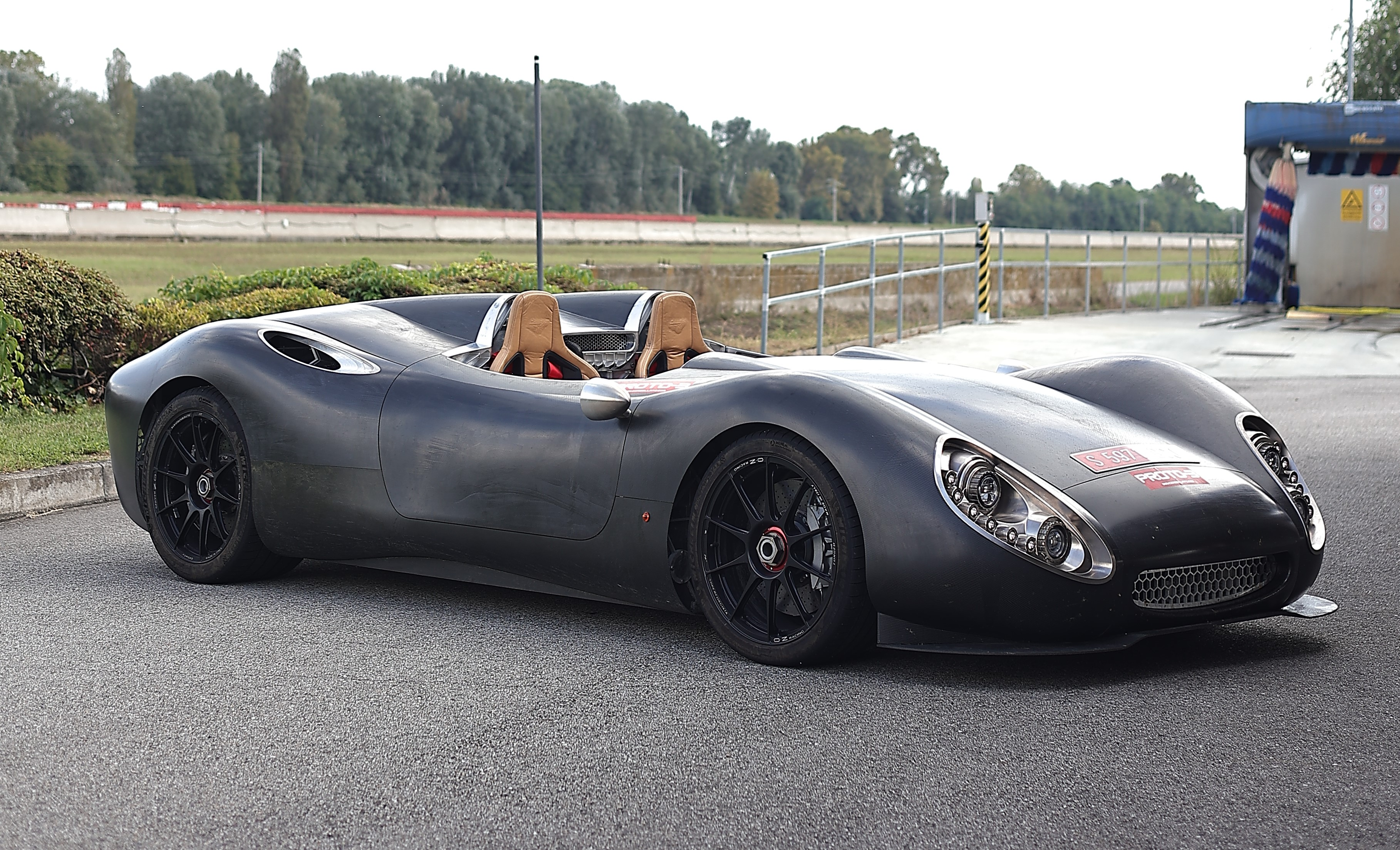
- Corbellati Missile Barchetta at Vairano track 2024

Overview
- Manufacturer: Corbellati
- Production: 2025 (expected)
- Designer: Achille Corbellati

Body and chassis
- Class: Sports car (S)
- Body style: 2-door coupe 2-door barchetta
- Layout: RMR layout

Powertrain
- Engine: 9.0L twin-turbocharged Mercury Racing V8 (planned)
- Power output: 1,342 kW (1,800 hp; 1,825 PS)
- Transmission: 6-speed manual

Dimensions
- Wheelbase: 112 in (2844.8 mm)
- Length: 183 in (4648.2 mm)
- Width: 80 in (2032 mm)
- Height: 46 in (1168.4 mm)

The Corbellati Missile is a concept supercar built by Corbellati. The production model is set to be launched in 2025. It was unveiled at the 2018 Geneva Motor Show and is currently in pre-production prototype testing phase.

== History ==
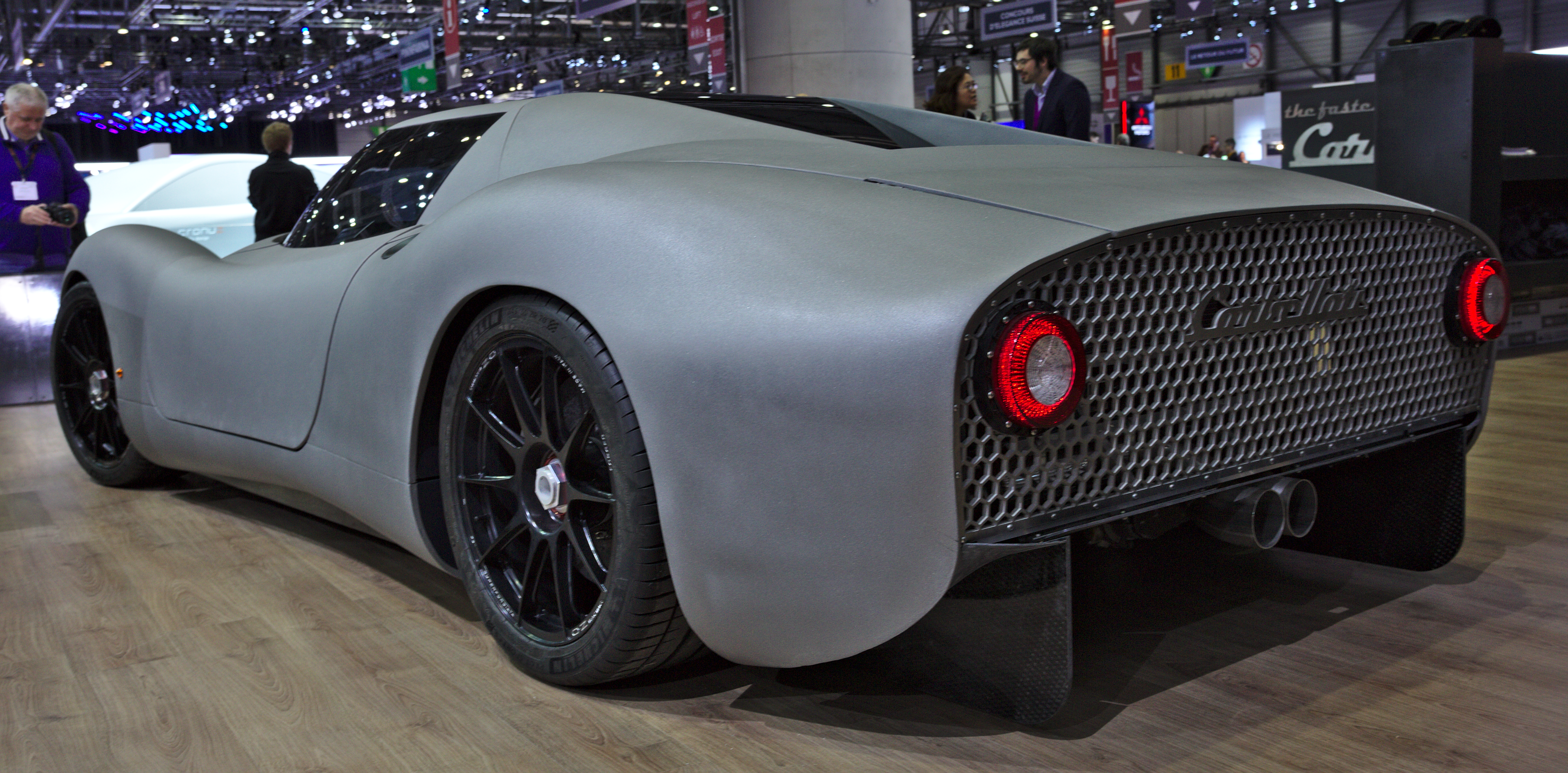
Rear view Corbellati Missile

The Missile is built by Corbellati, the production models are set to be manufactured in the Canary Islands. It was designed by Achille Corbellati and took inspiration from 1960s racecars.

== Performance ==
The Missile is planned to be powered by a twin-turbocharged 9.0L Mercury Racing V8 that Corbellati claims will produce 1,800 hp (1,342 kW) and 1,700 lb⋅ft (2,305 N⋅m) of torque with a goal of a 500 km/h (310 mph) top speed. Power goes to the rear wheels through a six-speed manual transmission and a limited slip rear differential. Corbellati says the car features a fully machined aluminium spaceframe chassis, though it was initially reported that it would use a carbon fiber chassis, as well as double wishbone suspension front and rear and carbon ceramic disc brakes with six piston calipers. The prototype was hand built by Corbellati and runs and drives.
