= Pedro Kanof =

Italian engineer and inventor

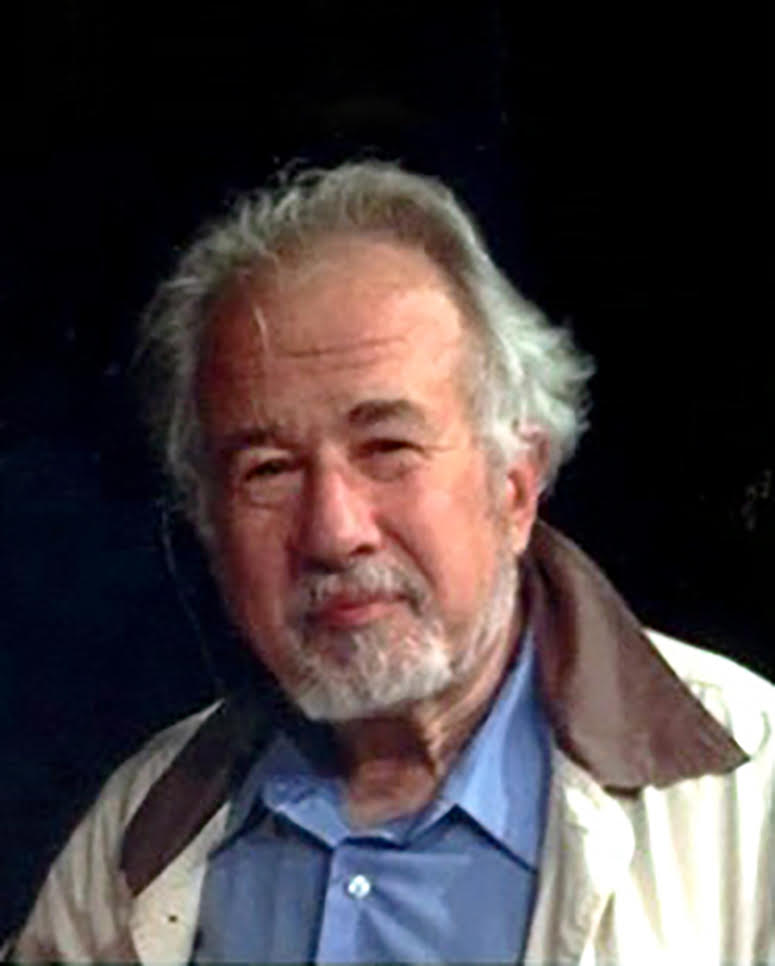
Pedro Kanof

Pedro Roberto Kanof is an Argentine-Italian engineer and inventor. He ideated the first electronic system and method for renting bicycles in the 1980s, the same method that is now used globally in the bicycle sharing system.

== Biography ==
Kanof was born in Buenos Aires, in 1944. After having studied Electronics and Computer Science in Buenos Aires and Paris, Pedro Kanof moved to Milan, Italy, in 1972. In 1976 he obtained a doctorate in Electronic Engineering at the Polytechnic University of Milan, and later on he continued his studying activities at Berkeley.

As an expert in IT, between the 1970s and the 1990s, Pedro Kanof worked in industries such as Alfa Romeo and Mondadori, and financial organizations like The World Bank and the International Monetary Fund. In the same period of time, he taught in various universities such as Berkeley, The Johns Hopkins University, the George Washington University and the University of Venice Ca' Foscari. In 1991 he edited the book Innovazioni tecnologiche: nuove opportunità per gli anni '90 (Technological Innovation: new opportunities for the '90s), published by Franco Angeli. In 2001 he contributed to the Forum on artistic education and the homonymous publication Arteinformazione. L'identità italiana per l'Europa (Artinformation. Italian Identity for Europe).

In 2007 he founded a company named Kanof Mobility Solutions LLC in Washington DC, which he directed until 2016, and then he kept working on his activities in Milan. The company's mission is to produce and install his latest invention, which consists of a new sustainable transportation system. This system is based on electronically protected parking stations for every type of bicycle, public or private. This invention represents a significant step in the evolution of the original automatic and electronic public bike renting system that he invented. On August 13, 2013, the USPTO (United States Patent and Trademark Office) granted the patent number 8,508 333 for his new invention.

From 2008 Kanof has been invited to take part to many conferences and international professional congresses on sustainable mobility and urban transport in various cities (among which Dresden, Copenhagen, Milan, Berlin, Rome, Turin and Lisbon) and Universities (such as Federico II University in Naples and Universiteit Gent).
