= Macchi L.2 =

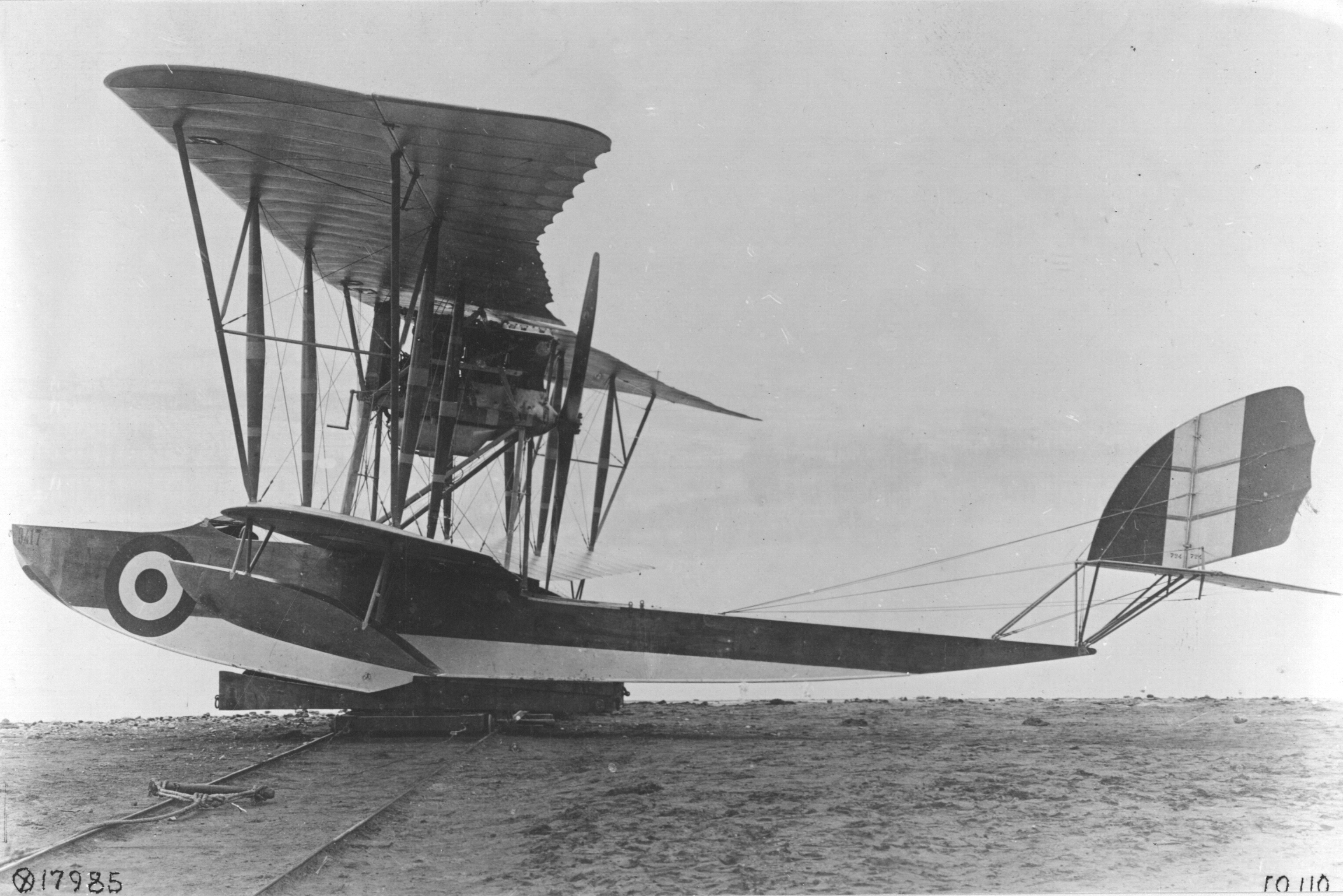

General information
- Type: Biplane flying boat
- Manufacturer: Macchi
- Status: retired
- Primary user: Italian Navy
- Number built: 10

History
- Introduction date: October 1916
- First flight: January 1916
- Developed from: Macchi L.1

The Macchi L.2 was an Italian biplane flying boat developed from the earlier Macchi L.1, itself a copy of a captured Austrian Lohner flying boat.

== Development ==
In an attempt to improve the performance of the L.1 flying-boat Macchi, the design was improved with a reduced span on the swept biplane wings and a more powerful 119 kW (160 hp) Isotta Fraschini V.4B engine. The L.2 was a three-bay unequal-span biplane flying boat with a two-man crew in side-by-side cockpits. It was powered by a single Isotta Fraschini engine, strut-mounted between the two wings and driving a pusher propeller. It was armed with a single machine gun on a trainable mounting and could also carry four light bombs. Ten L.2s were delivered to the Italian Navy, but they were soon replaced by the newer L.3.

== Operators ==
Kingdom of Italy

- Italian Navy Aviation

== Specifications (L.2) ==
Data from The Illustrated Encyclopedia of Aircraft (Part Work 1982–1985). Orbis Publishing. p. 2392.

General characteristics

- Crew: two
- Gross weight: 1,450 kg (3,197 lb)
- Powerplant: 1 × Isotta Fraschini V.4B , 119 kW (160 hp)

Performance

- Maximum speed: 140 km/h (87 mph, 76 kn)
- Range: 385 km (239 mi, 208 nmi)

Armament

- 1 × Fiat machine gun
- 4 × light bombs

== See also ==
Related development

- Lohner L
- Macchi M.3

Aircraft of comparable role, configuration, and era

- Donnet-Denhaut flying boat
- FBA Type H

Related lists

- List of flying boats and floatplanes
- List of World War I Entente aircraft
