= Macchi M.5 =

Italian flying boat fighter

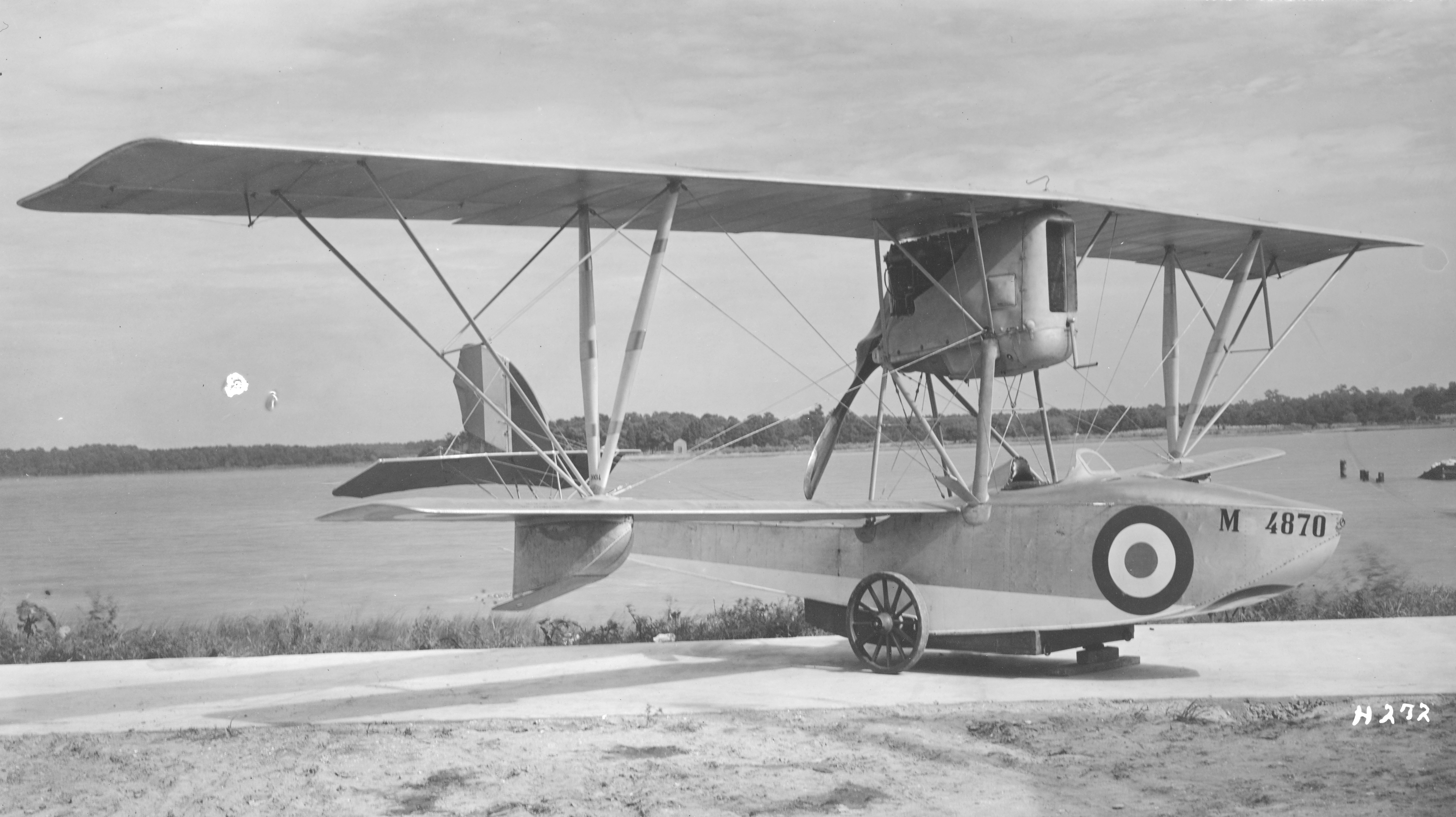

General information
- Type: Single-seat fighter flying boat
- National origin: Italy
- Manufacturer: Nieuport-Macchi
- Primary user: Italian Navy Aviation
- Number built: 244

History
- Introduction date: 1917
- First flight: 1917

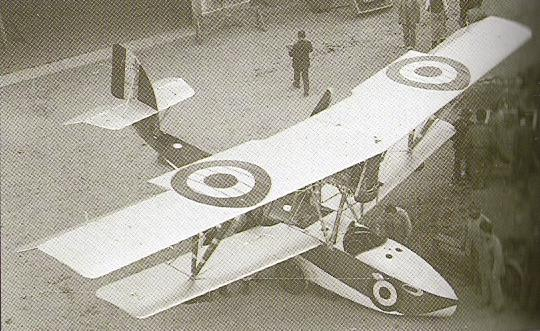

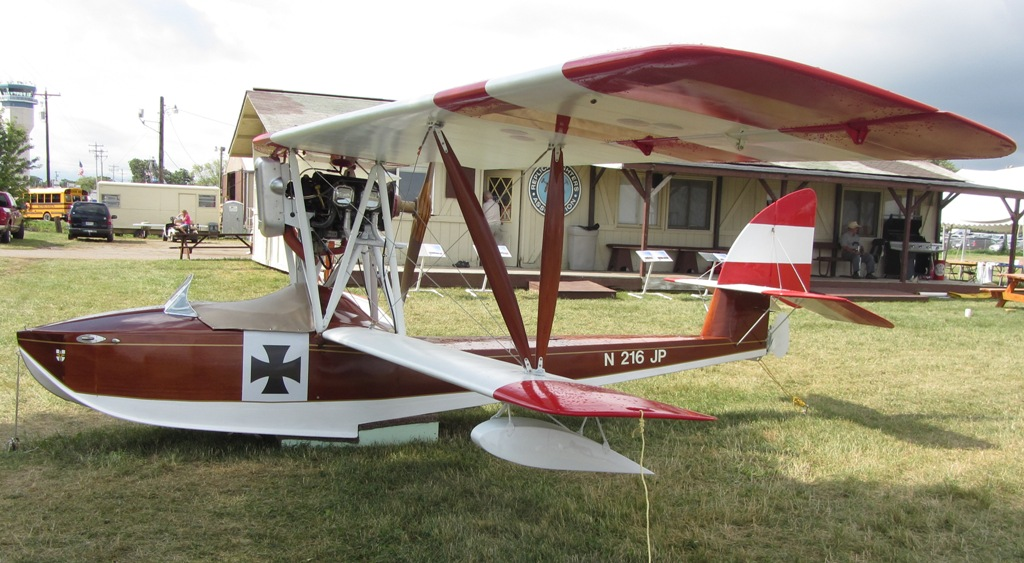
Replica M.5

The Macchi M.5 was an Italian single-seat fighter flying boat designed and built by Nieuport-Macchi at Varese. It was extremely manoeuvrable and agile and matched the land-based aircraft it had to fight.

== Development ==
The first prototype of a single-seat sesquiplane fighter was the Type M which first flew in 1917. Developed by engineers Buzio and Calzavera, it had a single-step hull and an open cockpit forward of the wings and was similar in design to the earlier Macchi M.3. It was followed by another prototype with a revised tail unit designated the Ma and further developed as the M bis and Ma bis. The production aircraft was designated the M.5 and like the prototypes was powered by a single Isotta Fraschini V.4B engine in pusher configuration. Deliveries soon commenced in the summer of 1917 to the Aviazione per la Regia Marina (Italian Navy Aviation). Late production aircraft had a more powerful Isotta Fraschini V.6 engine and redesigned wingtip floats. They were designated M.5 mod. Macchi produced 200 aircraft and another 44 were built by Società Aeronautica Italiana.

== Operational history ==
During World War I, the M.5 was operated by five Italian maritime patrol squadrons as a fighter and convoy escort, and some were embarked on the Regia Marina seaplane carrier Giuseppe Miraglia. Towards the end of World War I, M.5 aircraft were flown by both United States Navy and United States Marine Corps airmen. For his actions while flying an M.5 over the Adriatic Sea off the coast of Austria-Hungary on 21 August 1918, U.S. Navy Ensign Charles Hammann, an enlisted pilot at the time, received the first Medal of Honor awarded to a United States naval aviator.

In 1923, when the Regia Aeronautica was formed, 65 M.5s were still in service, although they all had been scrapped within a few years.

== Operators ==
Kingdom of Italy

- Regia Marina
- Corpo Aeronautico Militare

United States

- United States Navy
- United States Marine Corps

Brazil

- Brazilian Navy – Twelve Brazilian pilots trained in these aircraft, but the war ended before they could participate it.

== Specifications (Macchi M.5) ==
Data from

General characteristics

- Crew: one
- Length: 8.08 m (26 ft 6 in)
- Wingspan: 11.90 m (39 ft 0.5 in)
- Height: 2.85 m (9 ft 4.5 in)
- Wing area: 28 m^{2} (301.4 sq ft)
- Empty weight: 720 kg (1,587 lb)
- Gross weight: 990 kg (2,183 lb)
- Powerplant: 1 × Isotta Fraschini V.4B inline piston engine , 119 kW (160 hp)

Performance

- Maximum speed: 189 km/h (117 mph, 102 kn)
- Endurance: 3 hours 40 minutes
- Service ceiling: 6,200 m (20,340 ft)

Armament

- 2 × fixed, forward-facing .303 British (7.7 mm) Vickers machine guns

== See also ==
Related lists

- List of flying boats and floatplanes
