= Isotta Fraschini V.4 =

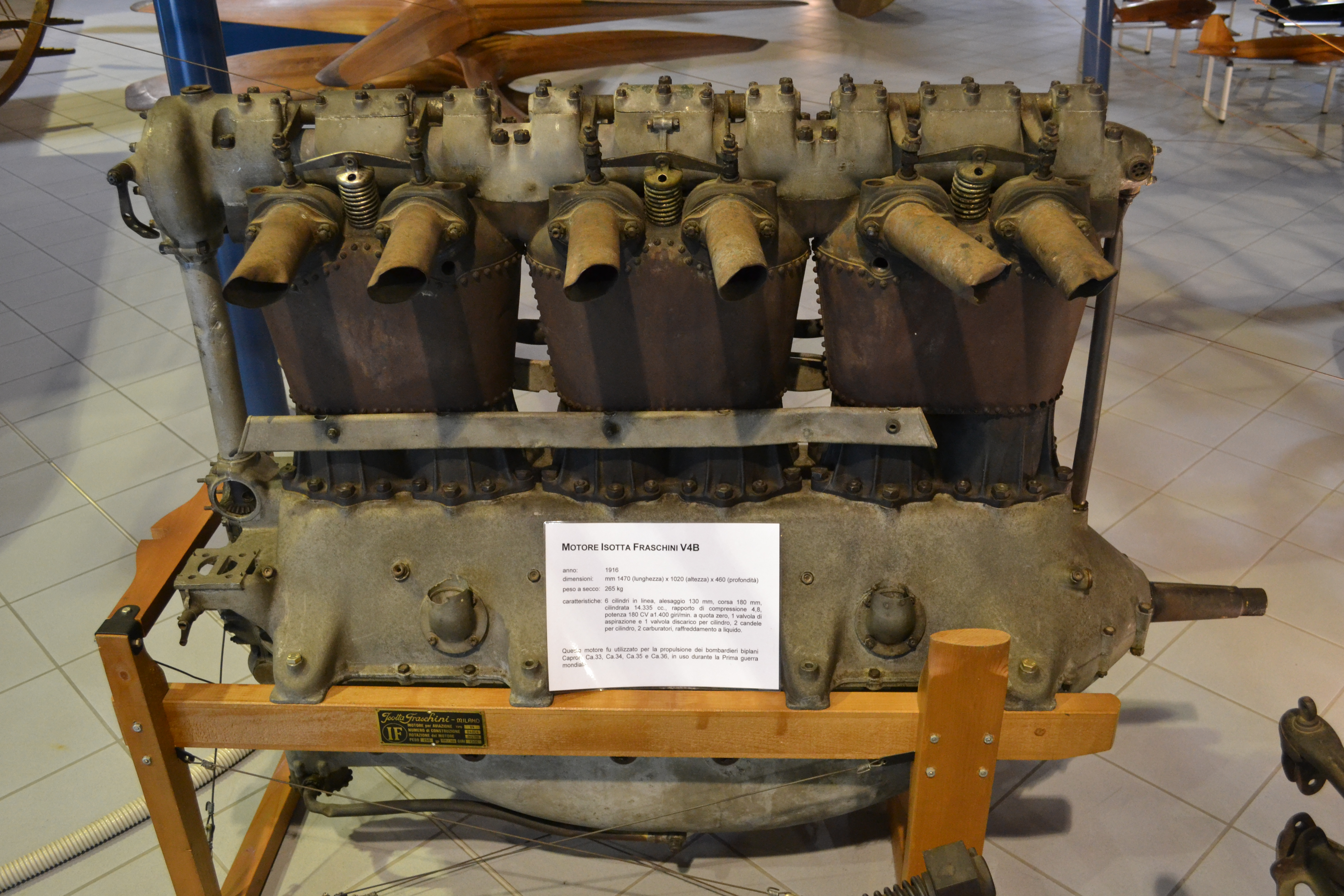
- Isotta Fraschini V.4b on display at the Gianni Caproni Museum of Aeronautics
- Type: Piston engine
- Manufacturer: Isotta Fraschini
- First run: 1916

The Isotta Fraschini V.4 of 1916 was an Italian six-cylinder, water-cooled, in-line piston aero engine of World War I (the "V" denoted "Volo" or "flight"). Its construction was fairly typical of aircraft engines of the period with six cast-iron cylinders mounted in pairs with common heads. This engine was also produced by Alfa Romeo.

== Applications ==
- CANT 7
- Caproni Ca.3
- Caproni Ca.30
- Caproni Ca.33
- Caproni Ca.34
- Caproni Ca.35
- Caproni Ca.36
- FBA Type H
- Macchi L.1
- Macchi M.5
- Macchi M.6
- Macchi M.8
- SIAI S.8

== Variants ==
V.4

V.4A
V.4B
V.4Bb

== Engines on display ==
- A V.4b is on display in the Gianni Caproni Museum of Aeronautics.
- The Caproni Ca.36 on display in the National Museum of the United States Air Force is fitted with a V.4b engine.
- A V.4b is on display in the Polish Aviation Museum.

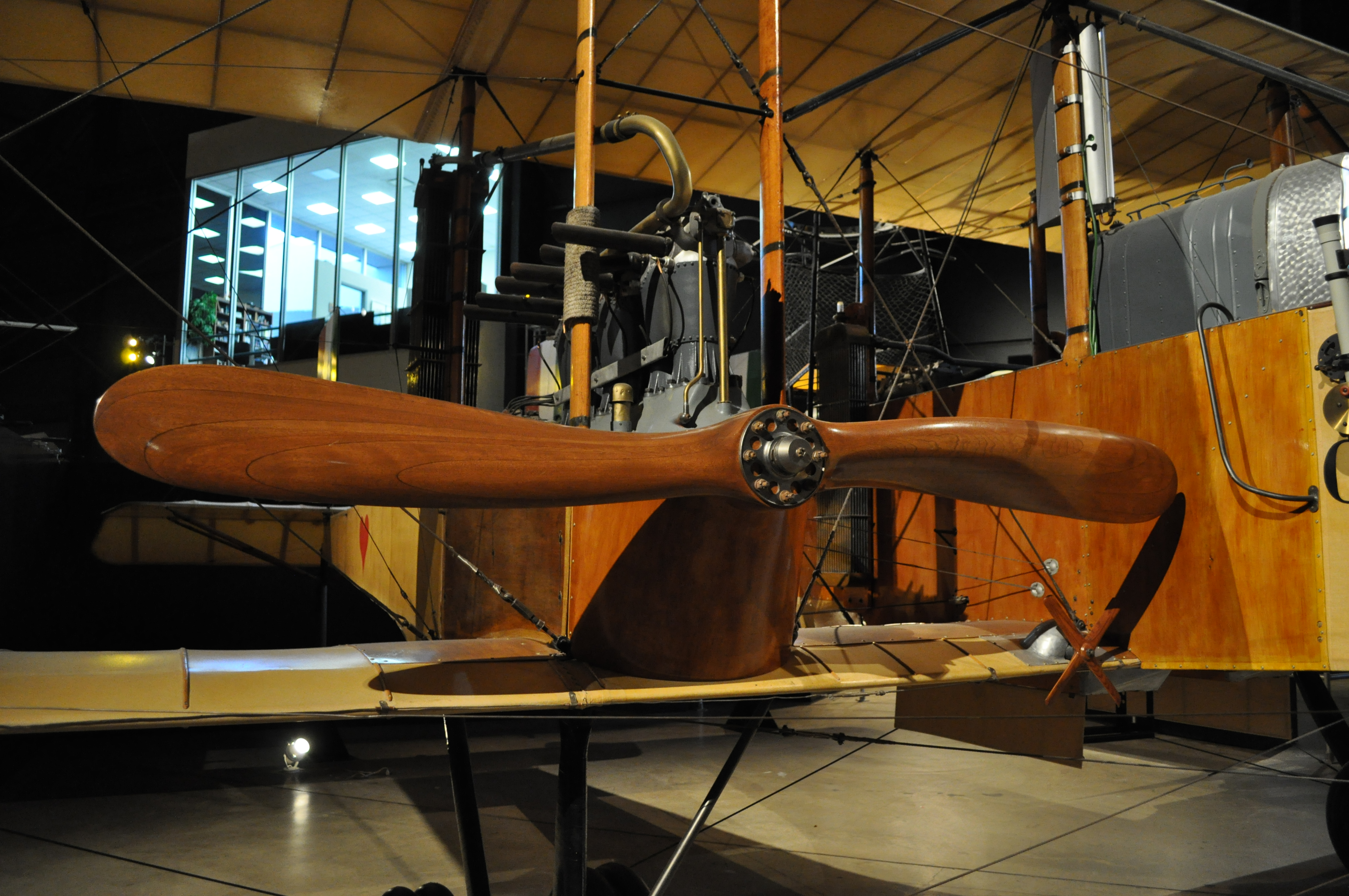
V.4B in a Caproni Ca.36 at the National Museum of the United States Air Force

V.4b on display at the Polish Aviation Museum

== Specifications (V.4b) ==
Data from Jane's Fighting Aircraft of World War I (2001); Gianni Caproni Museum of Aeronautics placard description

=== General characteristics ===
- Type: Six-cylinder, water-cooled, in-line piston engine
- Bore: 130 mm (5.12 in)
- Stroke: 180 mm (7.09 in)
- Displacement: 14.3 L (874 cu in)
- Length: 1,470 mm (58 in)
- Width: 460 mm (18.11 in)
- Height: 1,020 mm (40.15 in)
- Dry weight: 264 kg (584 lb)

=== Components ===
- Valvetrain: Overhead camshaft
- Fuel system: Twin carburettors, two six spark magnetos
- Oil system: Forced feed
- Cooling system: Water; cylinders in pairs, each pair in a steel water jacket

=== Performance ===
- Power output: 142 kW (190 hp) at 1,450 rpm
- Compression ratio: 4.8

== See also ==
Related lists

- List of aircraft engines
