= Macchi M.3 =

Italian biplane flying boat

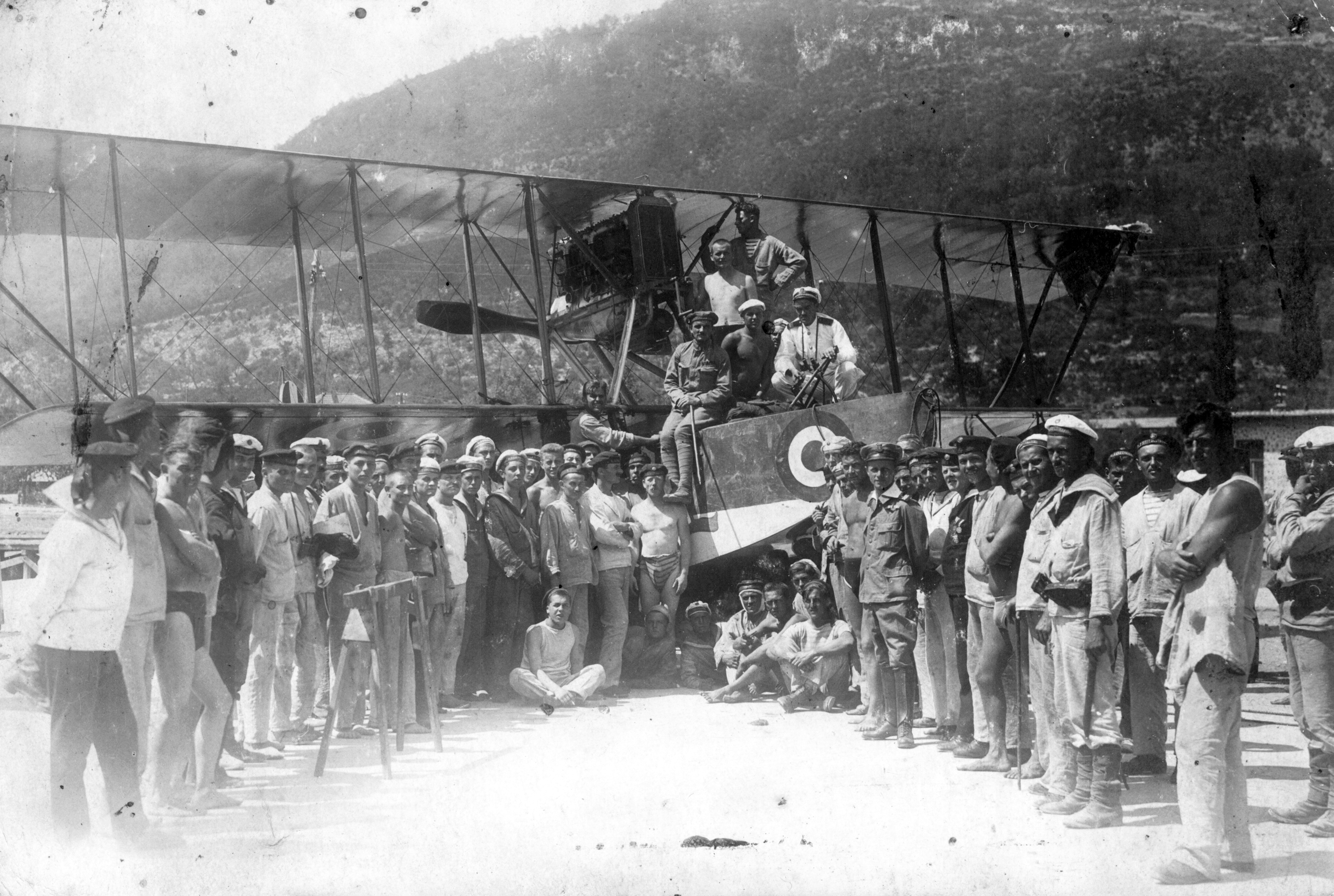

General information
- Type: Biplane flying boat
- Manufacturer: Macchi
- Primary user: Regia Marina
- Number built: 200

History
- First flight: 1916
- Retired: 1924
- Developed from: Macchi L.2

The Macchi L.3, or later Macchi M.3, was an Italian biplane flying boat developed from the earlier L.2.

== Development ==
The Macchi company had learned about flying boat design from copying an Austrian flying boat to produce the Macchi L.1 and improving it to produce the L.2. The result was the L.3, which was renamed the M.3 in 1917 to recognise the change in design from Lohner influenced to a Macchi design. Only the unequal-span biplane wings were inherited from the L.2; a new and refined hull and strut-mounted tailplane were designed. Like its predecessors, the new plane was powered by a single Isotta Fraschini engine strut mounted between the two wings and driving a pusher propeller. It was armed with a single machine gun on a trainable mounting and could also carry four light bombs. In 1916, one aircraft gained the world altitude record for a seaplane when it climbed to 5,400 m (17,700 ft) in 41 minutes.

== Operational history ==
Over 200 M.3s were built and delivered to the Royal Italian Navy and were used on a variety of missions which including bombing, reconnaissance, patrol and escort. For a short period in 1917, it was also used as a fighter. Several aircraft were used in commando-style operations behind Austrian lines. The aircraft were highly regarded by the Royal Italian Navy and they were used on bombing raids and pioneered the Italian use of aerial photography. After World War I, the type was used by training units until 1924.

In 1919, an L.3 which belonged to the Italian Military Mission in Argentina connected Buenos Aires with Asunción, Paraguay for the first time. This plane was later donated to the Paraguayan government. Lieutenant Arturo Escario, who was already a pilot, trained in the L.3 in Argentina. This plane was destroyed in an accident on 30 September 1919. Its pilot, Lieutenant Escario, died the following day.

A number of second-hand aircraft were used by the Swiss company Ad Astra Aero to carry out charters and joy rides on the Swiss lakes, the two passengers were seated side-by-side behind a large windscreen with the pilot in a raised open cockpit further aft.

Two M.3s were fitted with Fiat A.12 engines and were re-designated Macchi M.4, but they were abandoned after completion in favour of the Macchi M.9.

== Operators ==
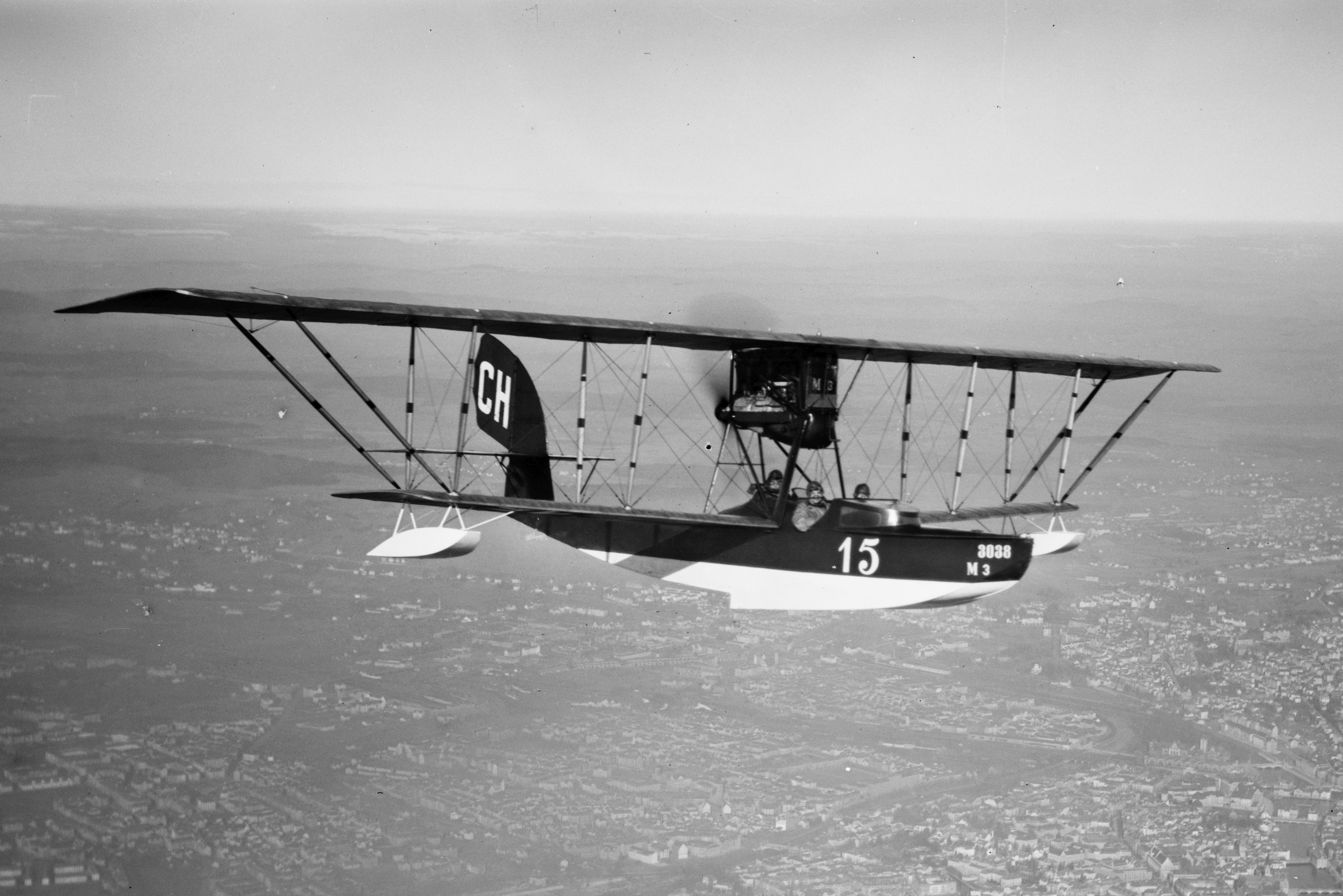
Ad Astra Aero M.3 CH-15

Kingdom of Italy

- Regia Marina

Switzerland

- Ad Astra Aero

Paraguay

- Paraguayan Air Force

== Specifications ==
Data from The Illustrated Encyclopedia of Aircraft (Part Work 1982-1985). Orbis Publishing. p. 2392.

General characteristics

- Crew: 2
- Wingspan: 15.95 m (52 ft 4 in)
- Gross weight: 1,350 kg (2,976 lb)
- Powerplant: 1 × Isotta Fraschini V.4B , 119 kW (160 hp)

Performance

- Maximum speed: 144 km/h (90 mph, 78 kn)
- Range: 385 km (239 mi, 208 nmi)

Armament

- 1 × Fiat machine-gun or a light cannon
- 4 × light bombs

== See also ==
Related development

- Lohner L.1
- Macchi L.2

Aircraft of comparable role, configuration, and era

- FBA Type S

Related lists

- List of seaplanes and flying boats
